= Larvik Municipality =

Municipality in Vestfold, Norway

Larvik Municipality Larvik kommune
- Municipality
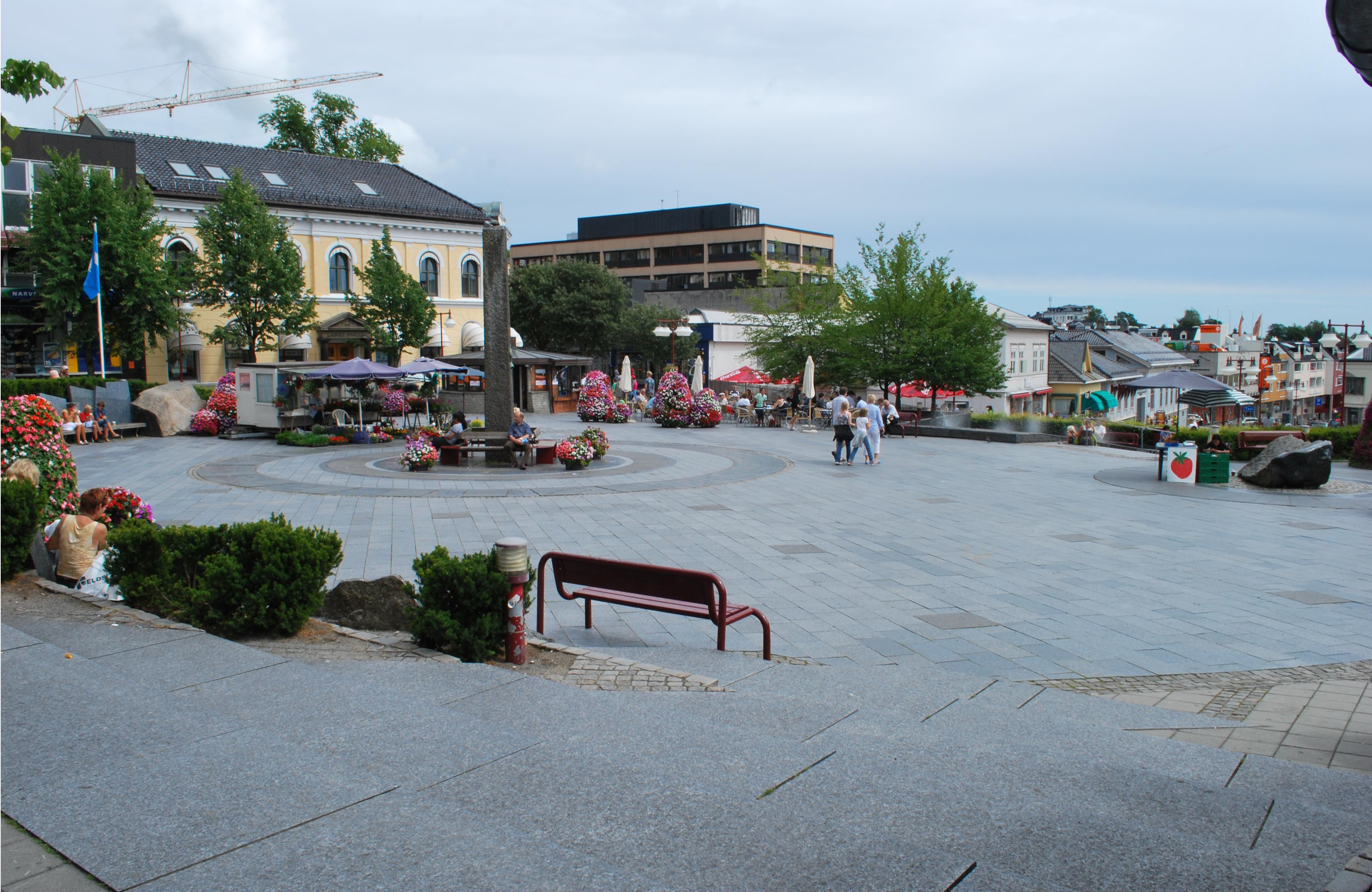
- Larvik town square, 2008

- Flag Coat of arms
- Nickname(s): Bakkebyen; The Hilly City
- Vestfold within Norway

- Larvik within Vestfold
- Coordinates: 59°4′52″N 10°0′59″E
- Country: Norway
- County: Vestfold
- Established: 1 Jan 1838
  - Created as: Formannskapsdistrikt
- Administrative centre: Larvik

Government
  - Mayor (2023): Birgitte Gulla Løken (H)

Area
  - Total: 812.88 km^{2} (313.85 sq mi)
  - Land: 771.41 km^{2} (297.84 sq mi)
  - Water: 41.47 km^{2} (16.01 sq mi) 5.1%
  - Rank: #140 in Norway
- Highest elevation (Pikstein): 622.04 m (2,040.8 ft)

Population (2026)
  - Total: 49,022
  - Rank: #22 in Norway
  - Density: 63.5/km^{2} (164/sq mi)
  - Change (10 years): ▲ +5.8%
- Demonym(s): Larviking; Larviker; Larvikar

Official language
  - Norwegian form: Neutral
- Time zone: UTC+01:00 (CET)
  - Summer (DST): UTC+02:00 (CEST)
- ISO 3166 code: NO-3909
- Website: Official website

Larvik (Urban East Norwegian: [ˈlɑ̂rviːk]; locally [²lærviːk]) is a municipality in Vestfold county, Norway. It is located in the traditional district of Vestfold. The administrative centre of the municipality is the city of Larvik. Other main population centres in the municipality include the town of Stavern and the villages of Gjone, Helgeroa, Hem, Kjose, Kvelde, Nevlunghavn, Skinmo, Svarstad, Ula, Verningen, and Tjøllingvollen.

The 812.88-square-kilometre (313.85 sq mi) municipality is the 140th largest by area out of the 357 municipalities in Norway. Larvik Municipality is the 22nd most populous municipality in Norway with a population of 49,022. The municipality's population density is 63.5 inhabitants per square kilometre (164/sq mi) and its population has increased by 5.8% over the previous 10-year period.

The city of Larvik achieved market town status in 1671, but it did not become a self-governing municipality until 1 January 1838 when the formannskapsdistrikt law went into effect. Larvik is known as the hometown of Thor Heyerdahl. It is also home to Bøkeskogen, the northernmost beech tree forest in the world. Larvik is the home of Norway's only natural mineral water spring, Farriskilden. Farris Bad, located in Larvik, has been described as one of the best spas in Europe. It has the largest spa department in Scandinavia.

== General information ==
=== Administrative history ===
The formannskapsdistrikt law of 1837 created a system of local government in Norway by establishing each town (ladested or kjøpstad) and each Church of Norway prestegjeld as a civil municipality. On 1 January 1838, the kjøpstad of Larvik was established as Laurvik Municipality (later spelled Larvik).

On 1 January 1875, a small area of Brunlanes Municipality (population: 4) and a different area of Hedrum Municipality (population: 46) were both transferred into Larvik Municipality. In 1937, another area of Hedrum Municipality (population: 69) was transferred into Larvik Municipality. In 1948, an area of Hedrum Municipality (population: 296) was transferred into Larvik Municipality. On 1 January 1974, the unpopulated Tagtvedt area of Hedrum Municipality was transferred into Larvik Municipality. On 1 January 1986, part of the Åsveien 3 property in Hedrum Municipality was transferred to Larvik Municipality.

On 1 January 1988, the following areas were merged to form an enlarged Larvik Municipality with a population of people:

- all of Larvik Municipality (population: 8,045)
- all of Brunlanes Municipality (population: 8,138)
- all of Hedrum Municipality (population: 10,449)
- all of Stavern Municipality (population: 2,538)
- all of Tjølling Municipality (population: 7,878)

On 1 January 2018, Lardal Municipality (population: 2,475) was dissolved and merged with Larvik Municipality (population: 44,082) to form an enlarged Larvik Municipality. After merging, Larvik became the largest municipality in Vestfold by area and the second-most populous municipality in Vestfold.

In 2020, there were many municipal and county mergers across Norway due to the work of the Solberg cabinet. Historically, this municipality was part of Vestfold county. On 1 January 2020, the municipality became a part of the newly-formed Vestfold og Telemark county (after Telemark and Vestfold counties were merged). The merger was shortlived, and on 1 January 2024, the merger was undone and this municipality became part of Vestfold county once again.

=== Etymology ===
The municipality (originally the town of Larvik) is named after the small cove at the end of the Larviksfjorden, which was historically called Lagarvík in Old Norse. The first element is the genitive case of lǫgr 'water, river' (here referring to the Numedalslågen River). The last element is vík 'cove, inlet'. Thus, the meaning of the name is 'cove at the mouth of a river'. Prior to 1889, the name was written Laurvik or Laurvig.

=== Coat of arms ===
Larvik has had three different coats of arms since 1889.

The first coat of arms was granted in 1889 and it was in use until 20 January 1989 when a new coat of arms was granted. The official blazon was "Argent, a leaved tree issuant from a mount vert". This means the arms have a field (background) has a tincture of argent which means it is commonly colored white, but if it is made out of metal, then silver is used. The charge is a green tree growing out of a green hill. The green color in the field and the tree design symbolize the local beech forest around the town. This design may have been chosen because for a couple of reasons. A beech tree had been used by the 18th century governor of the area, Jens Kielman. Also this beech tree design was part of a seal of a local guild in the early 19th century.

The second coat of arms was granted on 17 March 1989 and it was in use until 1 January 2018. The official blazon was "Azure, a mast with three sails argent" (Norwegian: I blått en sølv mast med tre seil). This means the arms have a blue field (background) and the charge is a ship's mast with three sails. The charge has a tincture of argent which means it is commonly colored white, but if it is made out of metal, then silver is used. The blue color in the field and the design were chosen to represent the maritime traditions of the municipality. The arms were designed by Kjell Ronald Hansen. The municipal flag had the same design as the coat of arms.

The current coat of arms was adopted for use starting on 1 January 2018. The blazon is "Azure, a tree with seven droplet-shaped leaves, of which six are opposite two and two, issuant from a mount argent" (Norwegian: I blått et oppvoksende tre med syv dråpeformede blader hvor av seks er motstående to og to, alt i sølv). This means the arms have a blue field (background) and the charge is a tree design with six leaves shaped like water droplets that are arranged symmetrically, three on each side and one on top. The charge has a tincture of argent which means it is commonly colored white, but if it is made out of metal, then silver is used. The arms have a complex symbolism. The seven drops symbolize forest water that flows into streams and further into the main Numedalslågen and Farriselva rivers. The tree design symbolizes the importance of the local beech forests and forestry industry. The six water drops also symbolized the ports spread along the coast as well as the six former municipalities that are now together as one large municipality. The arms were designed by Tormod Henriksen from Svarstad. The municipal flag had the same design as the coat of arms.

Coats of arms of Larvik

Current coat of arms
(2018–present)

Former coat of arms
(1989–2018)

Former coat of arms
(1899–1989)

== History ==
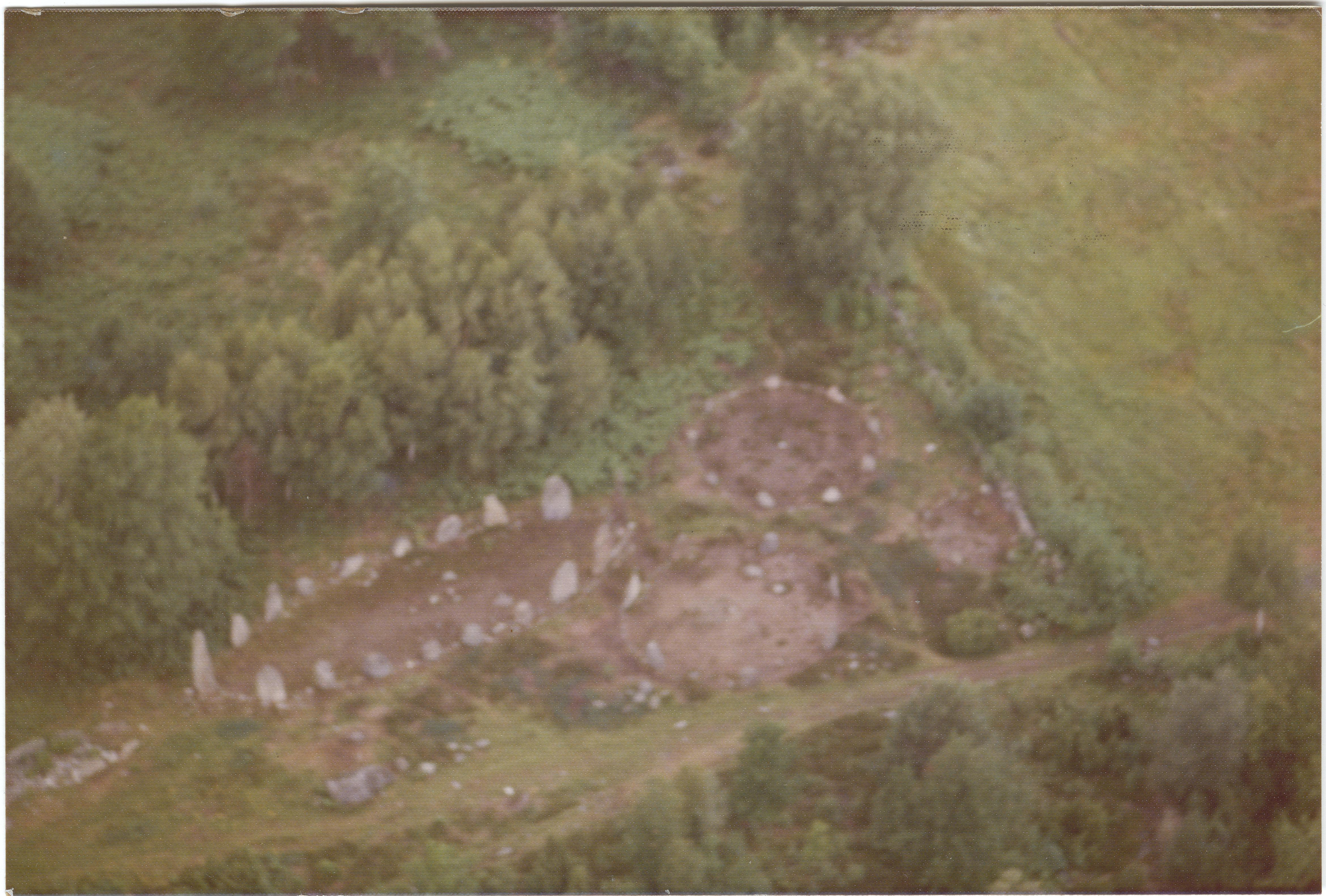
Istrehågan contains rock carvings dated to 1500-500 BCE.

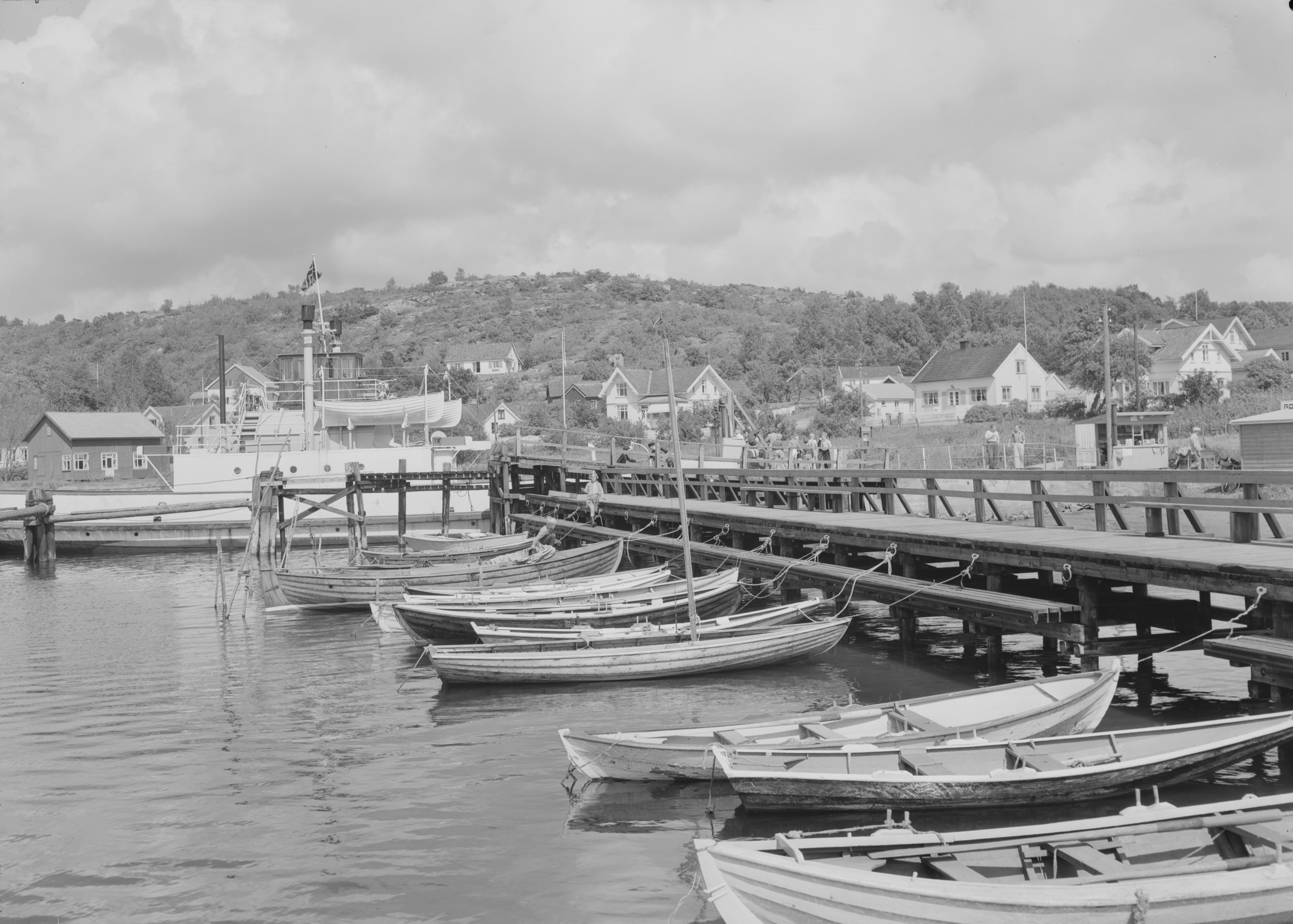
Helgeroa Harbour in 1953.

Various remains from the Stone Age have been discovered throughout the municipality of Larvik, for instance by Torpevannet near the village of Helgeroa. Raet goes through all of Vestfold County before peaking out of the ocean in Mølen in Larvik. Ancient peoples have carried rocks from Raet and constructed vast numbers of burial mounds at Mølen. During the Roman Iron Age, ancient peoples erected a stone monument resembling a ship at Istrehågan, one of Norway's greatest remains (oldtidsminne) from prehistoric times.

About 4 kilometres (2.5 mi) southeast of the town is Skiringssal, an archaeological site where archaeologists first discovered burial mounds and an ancient Viking hall, and later uncovered the nearby remains of an ancient town, Kaupang. This is now known as the oldest known merchant town in Norway. There was international trade from this area, over 1,200 years ago. Skiringssal has remains from the oldest town yet discovered in the Nordic countries, and it was one of Scandinavia's earliest urban sites.

Larvik (which historically used the Danish spelling: Laurvig) was an old coastal village. In 1671, the village received kjøpstad (market town) status in 1671 when Ulrik Fredrik Gyldenløve bought the Fritsø estate. He later became the first Count of Laurvig. The count built a new residence in 1674, "Herregården", which can still be visited today. The whole Larvik area was owned by a Danish Count (grevskap) until 1817. Since the rest of Norway had come under Swedish rule in 1814, the county was purchased by four local businessmen in 1817. Then in 1821, it became part of the newly created Jarslberg og Laurvigs amt (county).

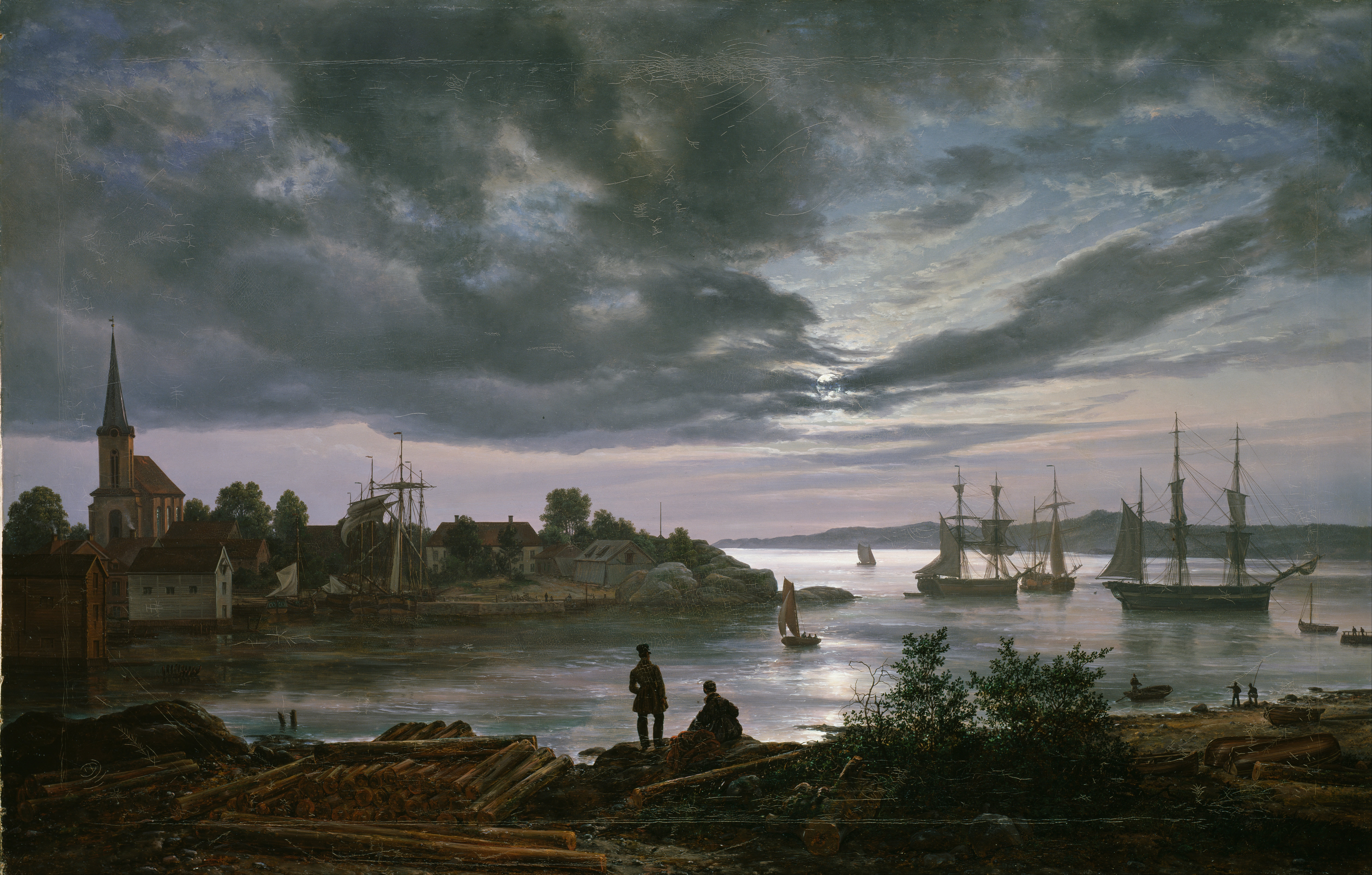
Larvik by Moonlight, 1839 painting by Johan Christian Dahl

Larvik is also the site of the Treschow estate, "Fritzøehus", which is currently owned by the heirs of Mille-Marie Treschow, reportedly "Norway's richest woman". The Treschow estate was created in 1835 when Willum Frederik Treschow bought the county from the Danish crown, who in turn had bought the county from the local consortium "grevlingene", four local entrepreneurs who proved unable to manage the ownership financially (the consortium had bought the county from the Danish crown in 1817 originally, the crown taking over the county when the last of the counts had to sell it because of debt).

Larvik, along with neighbouring cities of Sandefjord and Tønsberg, were the three dominant whaling cities of Norway in the late 19th and early 20th centuries.

== Government ==
Larvik Municipality is responsible for primary education (through 10th grade), outpatient health services, senior citizen services, welfare and other social services, zoning, economic development, and municipal roads and utilities. The municipality is governed by a municipal council of directly elected representatives. The mayor is indirectly elected by a vote of the municipal council. The municipality is under the jurisdiction of the Vestfold District Court and the Agder Court of Appeal.

=== Municipal council ===
The municipal council (Kommunestyre) of Larvik Municipality is made up of representatives that are elected to four year terms. The tables below show the current and historical composition of the council by political party.

Larvik kommunestyre 2023–2027
Party name (in Norwegian)	Number of representatives
Labour Party (Arbeiderpartiet)	8
Progress Party (Fremskrittspartiet)	9
Green Party (Miljøpartiet De Grønne)	1
Conservative Party (Høyre)	11
Industry and Business Party (Industri‑ og Næringspartiet)	2
Christian Democratic Party (Kristelig Folkeparti)	2
Red Party (Rødt)	1
Centre Party (Senterpartiet)	2
Socialist Left Party (Sosialistisk Venstreparti)	3
Liberal Party (Venstre)	2
Total number of members:	41

Larvik kommunestyre 2019–2023
Party name (in Norwegian)	Number of representatives
Labour Party (Arbeiderpartiet)	9
Progress Party (Fremskrittspartiet)	6
Green Party (Miljøpartiet De Grønne)	2
Conservative Party (Høyre)	8
Christian Democratic Party (Kristelig Folkeparti)	2
Red Party (Rødt)	2
Centre Party (Senterpartiet)	5
Socialist Left Party (Sosialistisk Venstreparti)	2
Liberal Party (Venstre)	1
Better Larvik (BedreLarvik)	4
Total number of members:	41

Larvik kommunestyre 2015–2019
Party name (in Norwegian)	Number of representatives
Labour Party (Arbeiderpartiet)	13
Progress Party (Fremskrittspartiet)	6
Green Party (Miljøpartiet De Grønne)	2
Conservative Party (Høyre)	8
Christian Democratic Party (Kristelig Folkeparti)	2
Centre Party (Senterpartiet)	2
Socialist Left Party (Sosialistisk Venstreparti)	1
Liberal Party (Venstre)	1
Total number of members:	35

Larvik kommunestyre 2011–2015
Party name (in Norwegian)	Number of representatives
Labour Party (Arbeiderpartiet)	14
Progress Party (Fremskrittspartiet)	8
Conservative Party (Høyre)	6
Christian Democratic Party (Kristelig Folkeparti)	2
Centre Party (Senterpartiet)	1
Socialist Left Party (Sosialistisk Venstreparti)	1
Liberal Party (Venstre)	3
Total number of members:	35

Larvik kommunestyre 2007–2011
Party name (in Norwegian)	Number of representatives
Labour Party (Arbeiderpartiet)	8
Progress Party (Fremskrittspartiet)	8
Conservative Party (Høyre)	9
Christian Democratic Party (Kristelig Folkeparti)	2
Centre Party (Senterpartiet)	1
Socialist Left Party (Sosialistisk Venstreparti)	1
Liberal Party (Venstre)	2
Larvik List (Larvikslista)	4
Total number of members:	35

Larvik kommunestyre 2003–2007
Party name (in Norwegian)	Number of representatives
Labour Party (Arbeiderpartiet)	13
Progress Party (Fremskrittspartiet)	10
Conservative Party (Høyre)	8
Christian Democratic Party (Kristelig Folkeparti)	2
Centre Party (Senterpartiet)	6
Socialist Left Party (Sosialistisk Venstreparti)	4
Liberal Party (Venstre)	2
Larvik List (Larvikslista)	8
Total number of members:	53

Larvik kommunestyre 1999–2003
Party name (in Norwegian)	Number of representatives
Labour Party (Arbeiderpartiet)	14
Progress Party (Fremskrittspartiet)	11
Conservative Party (Høyre)	13
Christian Democratic Party (Kristelig Folkeparti)	5
Centre Party (Senterpartiet)	3
Socialist Left Party (Sosialistisk Venstreparti)	4
Liberal Party (Venstre)	3
Total number of members:	53

Larvik kommunestyre 1995–1999
Party name (in Norwegian)	Number of representatives
Labour Party (Arbeiderpartiet)	18
Progress Party (Fremskrittspartiet)	11
Conservative Party (Høyre)	10
Christian Democratic Party (Kristelig Folkeparti)	4
Centre Party (Senterpartiet)	5
Socialist Left Party (Sosialistisk Venstreparti)	2
Liberal Party (Venstre)	3
Total number of members:	53

Larvik kommunestyre 1991–1995
Party name (in Norwegian)	Number of representatives
Labour Party (Arbeiderpartiet)	15
Progress Party (Fremskrittspartiet)	5
Conservative Party (Høyre)	15
Christian Democratic Party (Kristelig Folkeparti)	4
Centre Party (Senterpartiet)	5
Socialist Left Party (Sosialistisk Venstreparti)	7
Liberal Party (Venstre)	2
Total number of members:	53

Larvik kommunestyre 1987–1991
Party name (in Norwegian)	Number of representatives
Labour Party (Arbeiderpartiet)	24
Progress Party (Fremskrittspartiet)	8
Conservative Party (Høyre)	20
Christian Democratic Party (Kristelig Folkeparti)	6
Centre Party (Senterpartiet)	4
Socialist Left Party (Sosialistisk Venstreparti)	3
Liberal Party (Venstre)	4
Total number of members:	69

Larvik bystyre 1983–1987
Party name (in Norwegian)	Number of representatives
Labour Party (Arbeiderpartiet)	23
Progress Party (Fremskrittspartiet)	1
Conservative Party (Høyre)	13
Christian Democratic Party (Kristelig Folkeparti)	3
Socialist Left Party (Sosialistisk Venstreparti)	3
Liberal Party (Venstre)	2
Total number of members:	45

Larvik bystyre 1979–1983
Party name (in Norwegian)	Number of representatives
Labour Party (Arbeiderpartiet)	22
Conservative Party (Høyre)	13
Christian Democratic Party (Kristelig Folkeparti)	4
Socialist Left Party (Sosialistisk Venstreparti)	3
Liberal Party (Venstre)	3
Total number of members:	45

Larvik bystyre 1975–1979
Party name (in Norwegian)	Number of representatives
Labour Party (Arbeiderpartiet)	27
Conservative Party (Høyre)	12
Christian Democratic Party (Kristelig Folkeparti)	5
New People's Party (Nye Folkepartiet)	1
Socialist Left Party (Sosialistisk Venstreparti)	5
Liberal Party (Venstre)	3
Total number of members:	53

Larvik bystyre 1971–1975
Party name (in Norwegian)	Number of representatives
Labour Party (Arbeiderpartiet)	26
Conservative Party (Høyre)	10
Christian Democratic Party (Kristelig Folkeparti)	4
Liberal Party (Venstre)	6
Socialist common list (Venstresosialistiske felleslister)	7
Total number of members:	53

Larvik bystyre 1967–1971
Party name (in Norwegian)	Number of representatives
Labour Party (Arbeiderpartiet)	27
Conservative Party (Høyre)	11
Communist Party (Kommunistiske Parti)	4
Christian Democratic Party (Kristelig Folkeparti)	3
Socialist People's Party (Sosialistisk Folkeparti)	2
Liberal Party (Venstre)	6
Total number of members:	53

Larvik bystyre 1963–1967
Party name (in Norwegian)	Number of representatives
Labour Party (Arbeiderpartiet)	30
Conservative Party (Høyre)	12
Communist Party (Kommunistiske Parti)	3
Christian Democratic Party (Kristelig Folkeparti)	2
Socialist People's Party (Sosialistisk Folkeparti)	1
Liberal Party (Venstre)	5
Total number of members:	53

Larvik bystyre 1959–1963
Party name (in Norwegian)	Number of representatives
Labour Party (Arbeiderpartiet)	29
Conservative Party (Høyre)	10
Communist Party (Kommunistiske Parti)	5
Christian Democratic Party (Kristelig Folkeparti)	3
Liberal Party (Venstre)	6
Total number of members:	53

Larvik bystyre 1955–1959
Party name (in Norwegian)	Number of representatives
Labour Party (Arbeiderpartiet)	29
Conservative Party (Høyre)	10
Communist Party (Kommunistiske Parti)	5
Christian Democratic Party (Kristelig Folkeparti)	3
Liberal Party (Venstre)	6
Total number of members:	53

Larvik bystyre 1951–1955
Party name (in Norwegian)	Number of representatives
Labour Party (Arbeiderpartiet)	27
Conservative Party (Høyre)	9
Communist Party (Kommunistiske Parti)	6
Christian Democratic Party (Kristelig Folkeparti)	4
Liberal Party (Venstre)	6
Total number of members:	52

Larvik bystyre 1947–1951
Party name (in Norwegian)	Number of representatives
Labour Party (Arbeiderpartiet)	17
Conservative Party (Høyre)	8
Communist Party (Kommunistiske Parti)	8
Christian Democratic Party (Kristelig Folkeparti)	5
Liberal Party (Venstre)	6
Total number of members:	44

Larvik bystyre 1945–1947
Party name (in Norwegian)	Number of representatives
Labour Party (Arbeiderpartiet)	19
Conservative Party (Høyre)	6
Communist Party (Kommunistiske Parti)	14
Christian Democratic Party (Kristelig Folkeparti)	7
Joint list of the Liberal Party (Venstre) and the Radical People's Party (Radikale Folkepartiet)	6
Total number of members:	52

Larvik bystyre 1937–1940*
Party name (in Norwegian)	Number of representatives
Labour Party (Arbeiderpartiet)	29
Liberal Party (Venstre)	9
Joint List(s) of Non-Socialist Parties (Borgerlige Felleslister)	14
Total number of members:	52
Note: Due to the German occupation of Norway during World War II, no elections were held for new municipal councils until after the war ended in 1945.

Larvik bystyre 1934–1937
Party name (in Norwegian)	Number of representatives
Labour Party (Arbeiderpartiet)	26
Communist Party (Kommunistiske Parti)	1
Liberal Party (Venstre)	7
Joint List(s) of Non-Socialist Parties (Borgerlige Felleslister)	12
Local List(s) (Lokale lister)	6
Total number of members:	52

Larvik bystyre 1931–1934
Party name (in Norwegian)	Number of representatives
Labour Party (Arbeiderpartiet)	25
Conservative Party (Høyre)	18
Liberal Party (Venstre)	9
Total number of members:	52

Larvik bystyre 1928–1931
Party name (in Norwegian)	Number of representatives
Labour Party (Arbeiderpartiet)	26
Communist Party (Kommunistiske Parti)	1
Liberal Party (Venstre)	9
Joint list of the Conservative Party (Høyre) and the Free-minded Liberal Party (Frisinnede Venstre)	16
Total number of members:	52

Larvik bystyre 1925–1928
Party name (in Norwegian)	Number of representatives
Labour Party (Arbeiderpartiet)	18
Social Democratic Labour Party (Socialdemokratiske Arbeiderparti)	5
Liberal Party (Venstre)	10
Joint List(s) of Non-Socialist Parties (Borgerlige Felleslister)	16
Local List(s) (Lokale lister)	2
Workers' Common List (Arbeidernes fellesliste)	1
Total number of members:	52

Larvik bystyre 1922–1925
Party name (in Norwegian)	Number of representatives
Labour Party (Arbeiderpartiet)	18
Temperance Party (Avholdspartiet)	4
Social Democratic Labour Party (Socialdemokratiske Arbeiderparti)	6
Liberal Party (Venstre)	4
Joint List(s) of Non-Socialist Parties (Borgerlige Felleslister)	16
Local List(s) (Lokale lister)	4
Total number of members:	52

Larvik bystyre 1919–1922
Party name (in Norwegian)	Number of representatives
Labour Party (Arbeiderpartiet)	23
Temperance Party (Avholdspartiet)	5
Liberal Party (Venstre)	6
Joint List(s) of Non-Socialist Parties (Borgerlige Felleslister)	16
Local List(s) (Lokale lister)	2
Total number of members:	52

=== Mayors ===
The mayor (Norwegian: ordfører) of Larvik Municipality is the political leader of the municipality and the chairperson of the municipal council. The following people have held this position:

- 1838–1840: Parish priest Castberg
- 1841–1848: Ahlert Hysing
- 1849–1857: Johan Sverdrup (V)
- 1858–1860: Thorvald Olsen
- 1861–1868: Christian Christiansen (H)
- 1869–1870: T.M. Nielsen
- 1871–1874: Jens Zetlitz
- 1875–1875: Carl Lund
- 1875–1878: Christian Christiansen (H)
- 1878–1880: J.W. Falch
- 1880–1884: Lauritz Schmidt
- 1885–1886: Jul. Johnsen
- 1887–1888: Lauritz Schmidt
- 1889–1890: Colin Archer
- 1891–1891: Mr. Sølsberg
- 1891–1892: Sophus Caspar Singdahlsen
- 1893–1897: Michael Velo (SmP)
- 1898–1898: Thorvald Johansen
- 1899–1901: Michael Velo (SmP)
- 1901–1903: Magnus Hesselberg Oppen
- 1904–1904: Niels Christian Odberg (V)
- 1905–1907: Thomas Arbo Høeg
- 1908–1910: Niels Christian Odberg (V)
- 1911–1911: Magnus Hesselberg Oppen
- 1912–1914: Ludvig Næss (V)
- 1915–1919: Karl B. Løwe (V)
- 1920–1921: Oscar Andersen (Ap)
- 1922–1923: Johan Andersen (Ap)
- 1924–1928: Trygve Rynning (LL)
- 1929–1931: Oscar Andersen (Ap)
- 1932–1934: Trygve Rynning (LL)
- 1934–1940: Oscar Andersen (Ap)
- 1941–1941: Karl B. Løwe (V)
- 1941–1945: Rolf Bjørn Høvik (NS)
- 1945–1945: Oscar Andersen (Ap)
- 1946–1953: Charles Anderssen (Ap)
- 1953–1955: Kristian Albert Christiansen (Ap)
- 1956–1959: Christian Larsen (Ap)
- 1960–1971: Reidar Hansen (Ap)
- 1972–1983: Gunnar Ellefsen (Ap)
- 1984–1987: Gunnar Jensen (Ap)
- 1988–1991: Arild Lund (H)
- 1992–1993: Ragnar Johannessen (Ap)
- 1994–1999: Øyvind Hunskaar (Sp)
- 1999–2011: Øyvind Riise Jenssen (H)
- 2011–2019: Rune Høiseth (Ap)
- 2019–2023: Erik Bringedal (H)
- 2023–present: Birgitte Gulla Løken (H)

== Demographics ==
Number of minorities in Larvik (1st & 2nd gen - 2023)
Ancestry	Number
Poland	1439
Syria	587
Lithuania	535
Iraq	439
Vietnam	305
Somalia	275
Sweden	245
Denmark	229
Kosovo	227
Germany	207
Eritrea	203
Ukraine	198
Türkiye	176
Philippines	173
Bosnia	161
Sudan	148
Thailand	132
Russia	127
United Kingdom	123
Afghanistan	106

Larvik's population is primarily centred along the coast. The administrative centre of the municipality is the town of Larvik, is one of two cities in the municipality; the other one being Stavern. The city's residential areas are first and foremost in the hills between the fjord and Bøkeskogen.

The municipality had a total population of 49,012 as of Q2 2025, with 4,159 of them being immigrants to Norway from other countries. Figures from a census held at the beginning of the 19th century indicate that Larvik's population has quadrupled in approximately 200 years. Its population however is spread through the municipality, and about 50% of the people reside in the city of Larvik. The majority of the population is found along and around the Larviksfjorden, from Stavern in the west to Gon in the east. The population sometimes doubles during summer weeks due to tourism. Larvik is home to 4,886 vacation homes as of 2023.

== Economy ==
Larvik is the most important agricultural municipality in Vestfold county. Besides grains, other crops grown include potatoes and vegetables. It has the county's largest production of cucumbers and tomatoes. Important industries are commerce, hotel management, and restaurant management. The fishing industry in Larvik is the second-largest in Vestfold, only smaller than the fishing industry in Færder Municipality. Important fishing harbours include Stavern, Helgeroa, and Nevlunghavn. Furthermore, Larvik has the biggest logging industry in the county. Norway Spruce is the most important tree species.

The mined mineral Larvikite, found only here, is exported from Larvik to countries in Europe, to the United States and many other countries.

=== Tourism ===
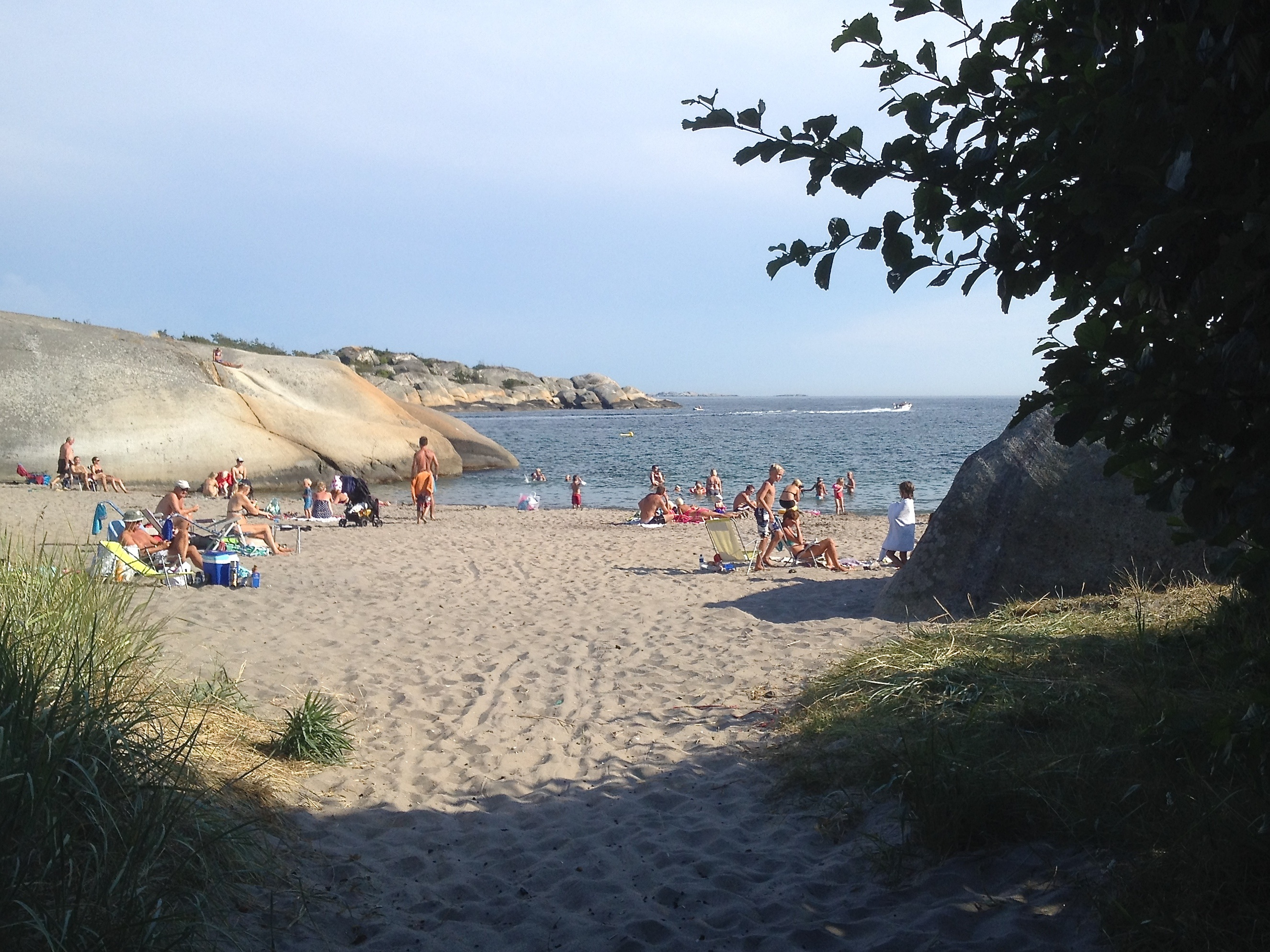
Beach at Ula.

Larvik is first and foremost known as a summer vacation community. Due to its stable climate and one of Norway's highest median temperatures, Larvik experiences significant summer tourism. Larvik's climate is among the mildest in Norway, with one of the nation's highest number of annual sunshine days. It is home to nearly 5,000 holiday homes.

The coastal town of Stavern and picturesque villages of Helgeroa and Nevlunghavn receive large numbers of tourists during summer months. Stavern is known as a summer community, and its population more than doubles during summers. Tourist attractions in Stavern include Hall of Remembrance, Fredriksvern, and Citadellet. Citadel Island is home of Staverns Fortress which dates to the 1680s. The island is a current refuge for artists.

Kaupang has been described as the "chief attraction" for visitors in Larvik. Kapuang is also known as Norway's most important monument from the Viking Age. Another source describes Mølen Geopark as Larvik's most visited tourist attraction. Other attractions include the Maritime Museum, Fritzøehus, Herregården, the home of Thor Heyerdahl, and Bøkeskogen. Larvik is also home to Farris Bad, the largest spa in the Nordic countries, which has been described as one of Europe's best spa facilities.

== Geography ==
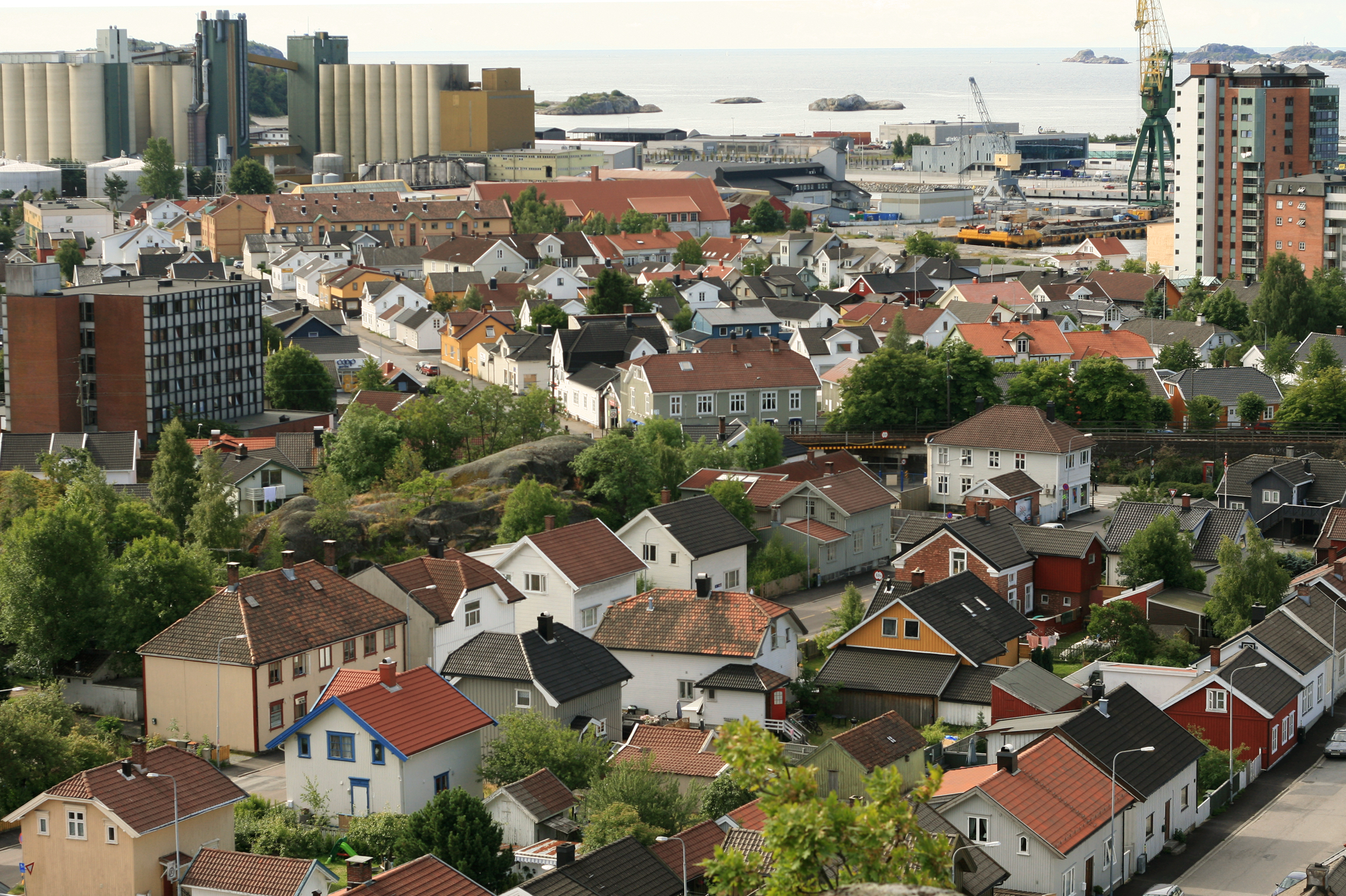
Torstrand in Larvik.

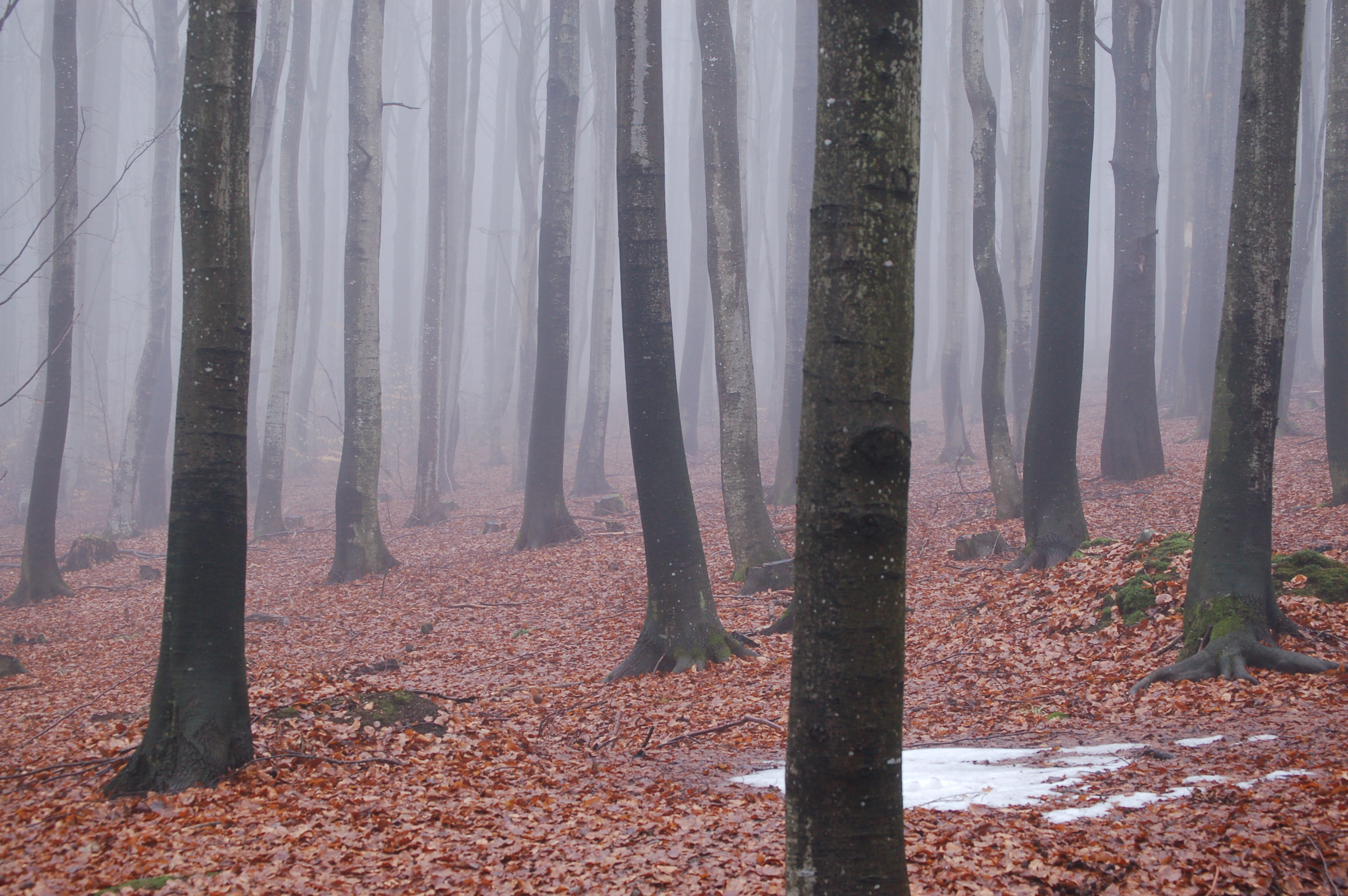
Bøkeskogen is Norway's largest and the northernmost beech tree forest on Earth.

Larvik Municipality occupies the southwestern corner of Vestfold county, between Sandefjord Municipality in the east and the Langesundsfjorden in the west. The coastline of Larvik stretches from the entrance to the Sandefjordsfjord and to the Langesundsfjord, with the Larviksfjorden in the middle. The coastline consists of various beaches, bays, islets, and skerries. The land is relatively flat along the coast and by the many bays, while the interior parts consist of large and hilly woodlands. Larger mountains are found along the border with Telemark County in the west. The municipality has a 110 kilometres (68 mi) coastline, a little shorter than that of neighbouring Sandefjord Municipality.

The municipality is located approximately 105 kilometres (65 mi) southwest of the Norwegian capital, Oslo. The municipality covers an area of 813 square kilometres (314 mi^{2}), making it the largest municipality in Vestfold county. By population, however, Larvik is the third-most populous municipality, only smaller than neighbouring Tønsberg Municipality and Sandefjord Municipality. Larvik has its own fjord which connects to the Lågen River.

Larvik Municipality borders Kongsberg Municipality in the north (in Buskerud county), Sandefjord Municipality in the east, and Porsgrunn Municipality and Siljan Municipality (both in Telemark county) in the west. The southernmost point in the municipality is Tvistein Lighthouse in the sea south of Hummerbakken. On the mainland, its southernmost point is found in Oddane, between Mølen and Nevlunghavn. The westernmost point is Geiterøya Island in the Langesundsfjord, and the easternmost point is one of the Rauer islets. The highest point is the 622-metre (2,041 ft) tall mountain Vindfjell which lies on the western border with Siljan Municipality in Telemark county.

Notable geographical features include the lake Farris and the river Numedalslågen, locally called Lågen, which terminates at the Larviksfjorden at the town of Larvik. Other bodies of water include the lakes Farris, Goksjø, and Hallevatnet. The highest point in the municipality is the 622.04-metre (2,040.8 ft) tall mountain Pikstein, located on the border with Kongsberg Municipality.

Larvik is also noted for its natural springs of mineral water, Farriskildene, which have been commercially exploited under the brand name Farris. At Kaupang in Tjølling lies the remains of the medieval Skiringssal trading outpost. Larvik is also home to the world's northernmost natural occurrence of Fagus sylvatica forests (European beech tree), known as Bøkeskogen ("The Beech Tree Forest").

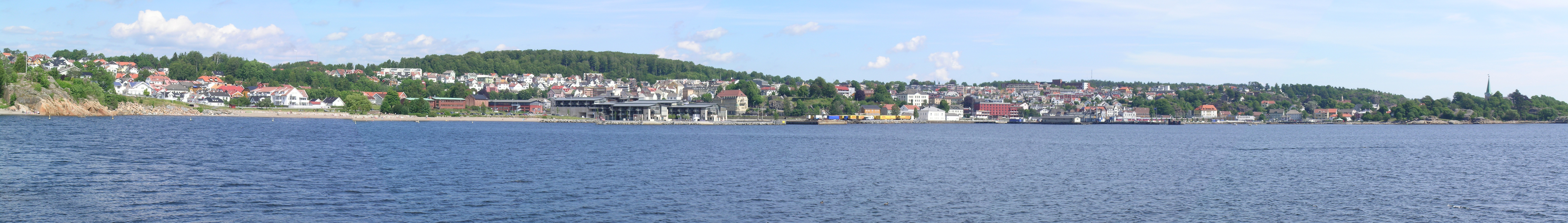
Larvik panorama

=== Settlements ===
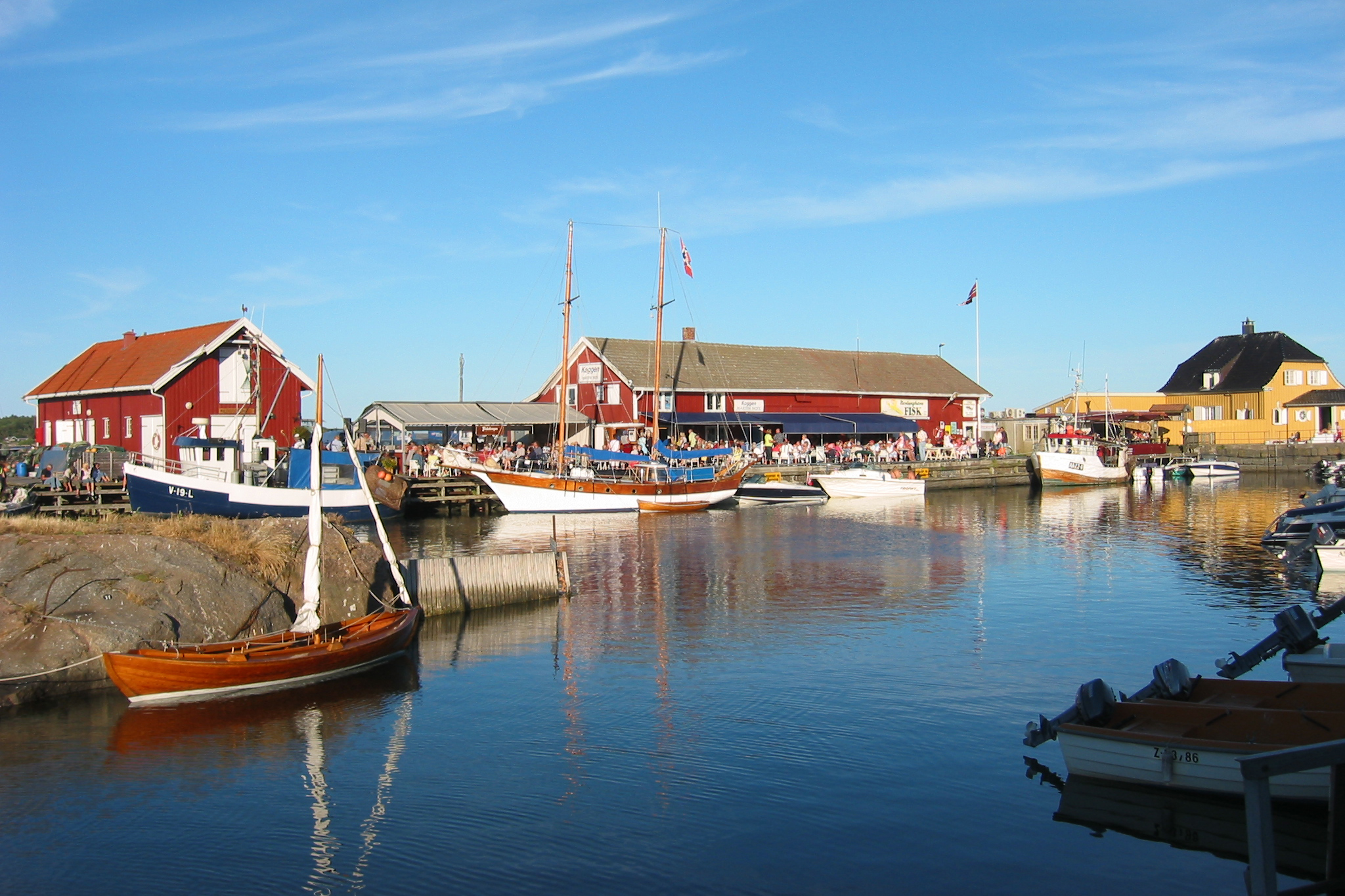
Harbour in Nevlunghavn, a small fishing village and the southernmost point in mainland Vestfold.

The municipality is home to two cities and seven larger urban villages:

- Larvik (city), population: 26,851
- Stavern (city), population: 5,902
- Tveteneåsen, population: 850
- Hem, population: 676
- Helgeroa and Nevlunghavn, population: 1,962
- Kvelde, population: 1,103
- Verningen, population: 1,003
- Svarstad, population: 611

Himberg is an exclave which is part of Sandefjord Municipality, although it is completely surrounded by Larvik Municipality in all directions. Attempts at annexing Himberg into Larvik Municipality have largely been met with protests from Himberg residents. A 1995 attempt at annexing Himberg was cancelled due to protests from local residents. There are only four such enclaves in Norway, and Himberg is the most populous enclave in Norway, with a population of approximately 40 people. Himberg is 1.4 square kilometres (0.54 sq mi).

=== Climate ===
Larvik has a warm-summer humid continental climate (Köppen: Dfb) with fairly cold winters and mild summers. In normal winters, snow is frequent but often melts quickly along the coast. Summers are sunny with daytime temperatures of 19 °C (66 °F) to 24 °C (75 °F) most places.

Climate data for Larvik - Tjølling 1991–2020 (15 m)
Month	Jan	Feb	Mar	Apr	May	Jun	Jul	Aug	Sep	Oct	Nov	Dec	Year
Daily mean °C (°F)	−0.6 (30.9)	−0.7 (30.7)	1.7 (35.1)	5.9 (42.6)	10.7 (51.3)	14.6 (58.3)	16.9 (62.4)	16.3 (61.3)	12.8 (55.0)	7.7 (45.9)	3.6 (38.5)	0.4 (32.7)	7.4 (45.4)
Average precipitation mm (inches)	55 (2.2)	50 (2.0)	49 (1.9)	55 (2.2)	64 (2.5)	79 (3.1)	79 (3.1)	117 (4.6)	102 (4.0)	132 (5.2)	111 (4.4)	84 (3.3)	977 (38.5)
Source: yr.no (mean, precipitation)

== Transportation ==
Larvik is served by Sandefjord Airport Torp, its nearest international airport. The European route E18 highway traverses the municipality and is one of Norway's most important main highways. Larvik Station is the city's main railway station along the Vestfoldbanen railway line. Daily ferries to Hirtshals, Denmark depart from the city harbour and are operated by Color Line. The neighbouring city of Sandefjord has several ferry links with daily departures to Strömstad, Sweden and, further south, the town of Langesund links to Hirtshals, Denmark through a ferry which is operated by Fjord Line.

== Recreation areas ==
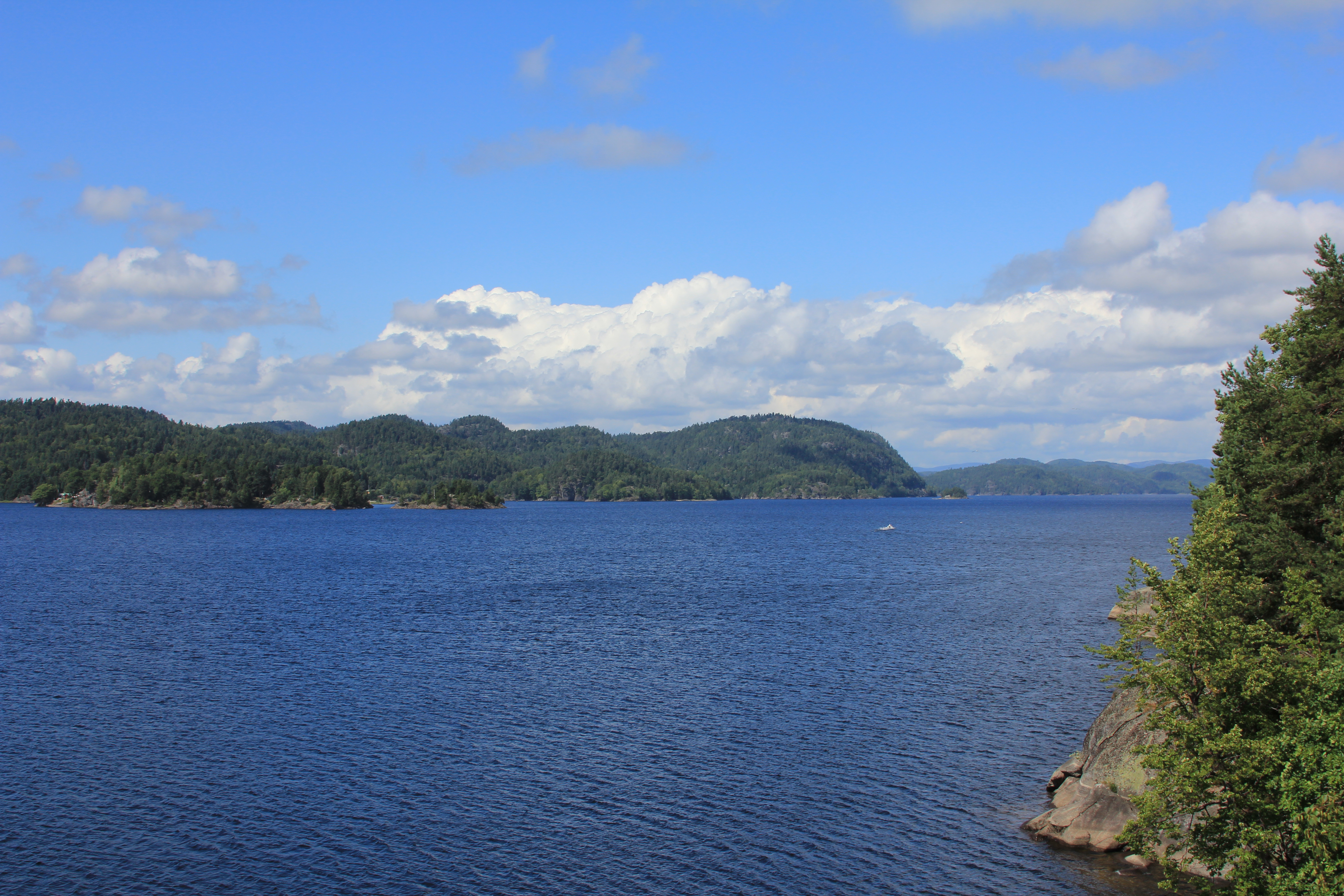
Larvik is home to two of Vesfold's largest lakes: Farris and Goksjø.

Recreation areas in Larvik include the beach Lydhusstranda at Naverfjorden.

The river Numedalslågen is considered to be one of Norway's best salmon fishing rivers. Freshwater fishing is also common at the lake Goksjø, which lies on the border between Sandefjord Municipality and Larvik Municipality. Fish species in this lake include Northern pike, European perch, Ide, Common dace, European eel, Salmon, and Brown trout. The lake is also used for ice-skating, canoeing, swimming, boating, and other recreational activities.

The 12-metre (39 ft) tall Trollfoss is the largest and tallest waterfall in Vestfold County.

Hiking trails can be found throughout the municipality, including in the city forest Bøkeskogen, Norway's largest beech tree forest. This forest is home to various trails, starting at 2.6 kilometres (1.6 mi) in length up to 10 kilometres (6.2 mi) in length. Hiking trails can also be found at Mølen, which is an UNESCO GeoPark and home of Norway's largest stone beach. The Coastal Path (Kyststien) is a 35-kilometre (22 mi) path through Brunlanes to the town Stavern. Additional hiking trails can be found by the lakes Goksjø and Farris. Farris Lake is the largest lake in Vestfold County.

Due to the municipality's many rural areas, Larvik is known for its game hunting, and large forests are open for hunting. There are great stocks of moose; Larvik has among Norway's highest number of moose. Between 700 and 800 moose are annually slaughtered in the county. Other important species of game are Roe deer, Red deer, Mountain hare, European beaver, and Common wood pigeon.

=== Beaches ===
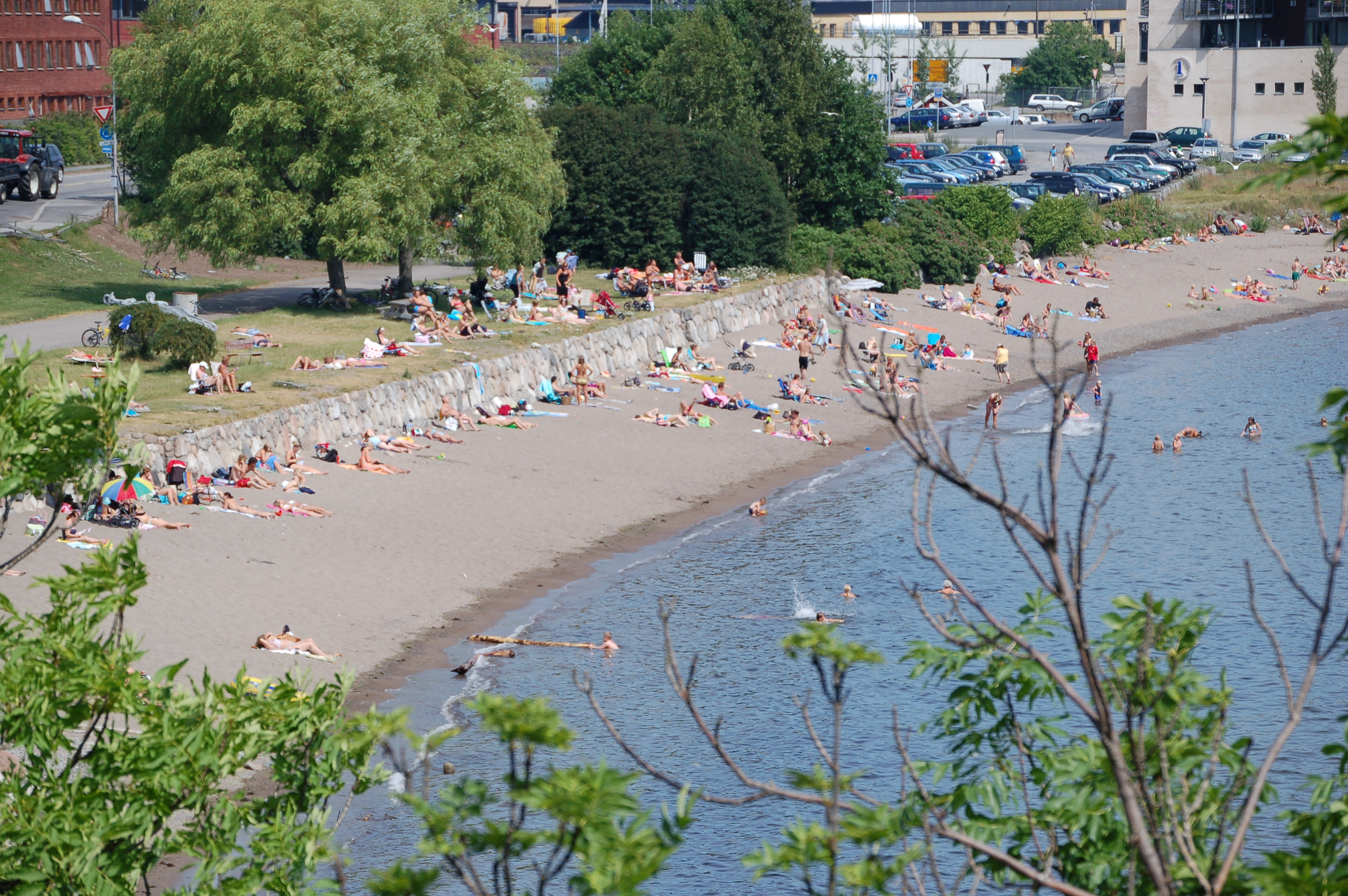
Batteristranda in Larvik city centre.

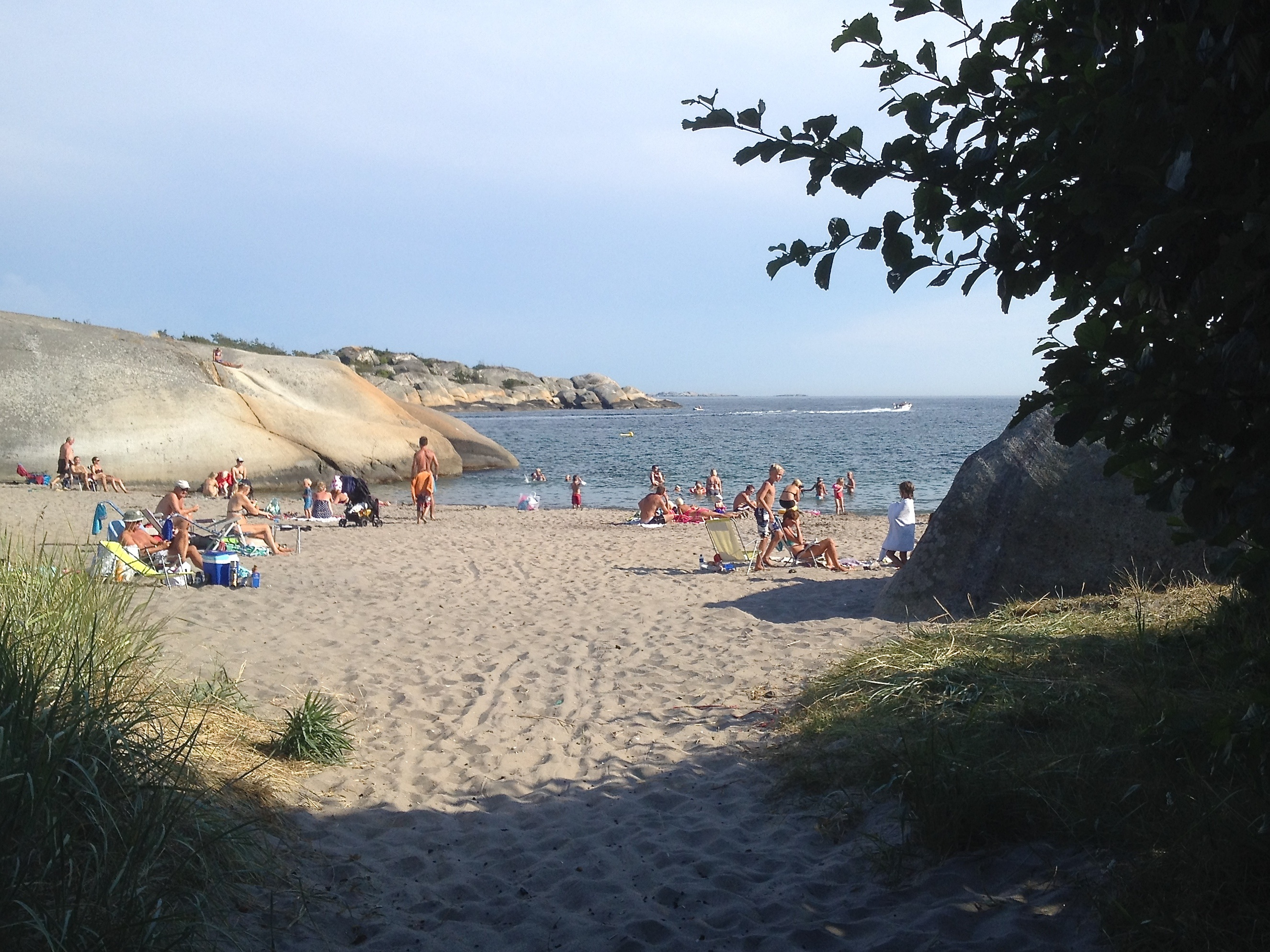
Beach in the village of Ula.

List of publicly-owned beaches in Larvik:

- Farris
- Rekkeviksbukta
- Batteritomta
- Gonstranda (Østre Halsen)
- Hvittensand (Østre Halsen)
- Corntin (Stavern)
- Blokkebukta (Naverfjord)
- Anvikstranda (Naverfjord)
- Stolpstadstranda (Naverfjord)
- Lydhusstranda (Naverfjord)
- Roppestad (Farris)
- Skjærsjø (Kvelde)
- Ula (Tjølling)
- Kjerringvik (Tjølling)

== Culture ==
=== Larvik Museum ===
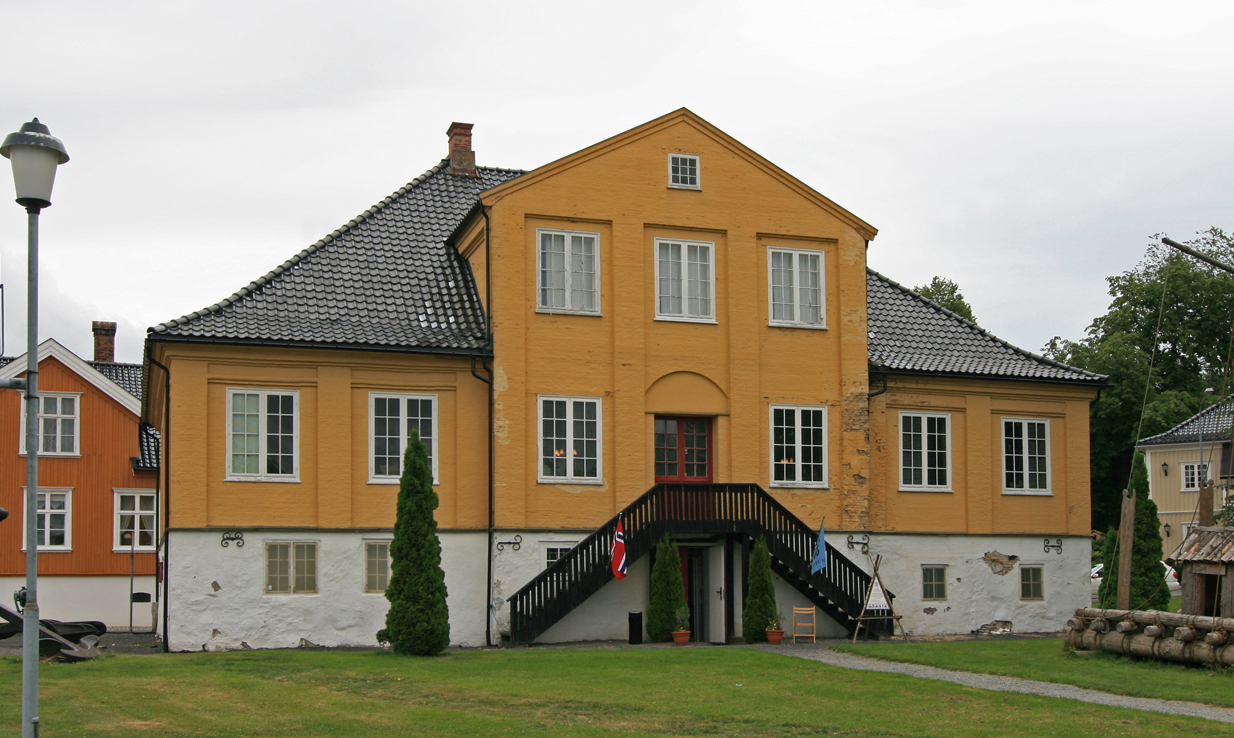
Larvik Maritime Museum is housed in Larvik's oldest brick building.

The Larvik Museum Society was founded in 1916. The museum is now associated with the Vestfold Museum (Vestfoldmuseene). Larvik Museum was established with the purpose of preserving, and restoring the city's collection of historic buildings.

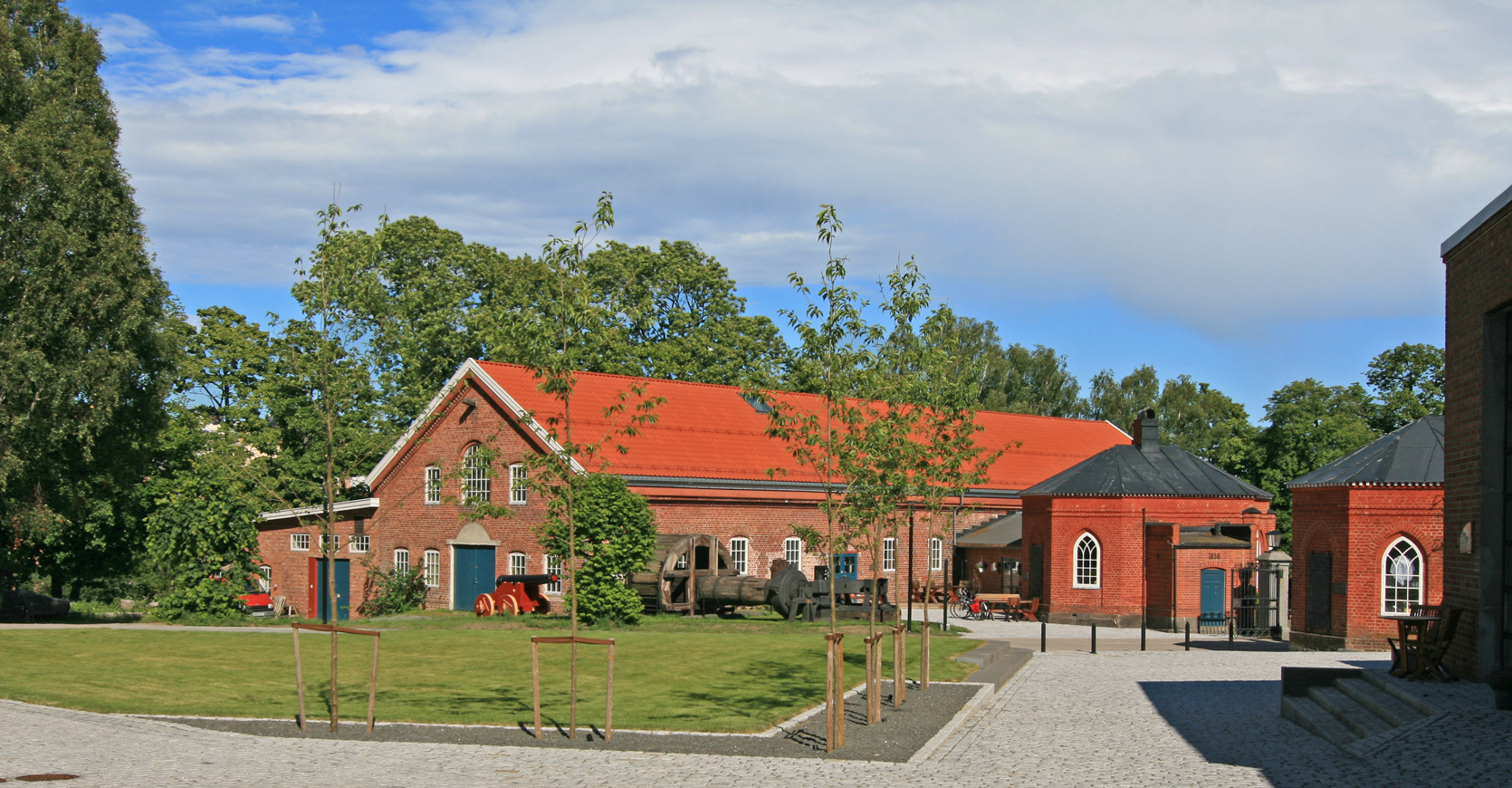
Verkensgården houses geological exhibitions of Larvikite, a locally quarried 500-million-year-old granite type.

The Treschow-Fritzøe Museum (Verkensgården) houses exhibitions from the former Treschow-Fritzøe ironworks. Verkensgården displays tools, equipment, drawings, and models illustrating the iron-production era in Larvik, which dated from 1670 to 1870. The exhibition shows various aspects; from the geological process of creation to production, and use of the stone larvikite, the area's main export product. The Iron Works was closed during 1868.

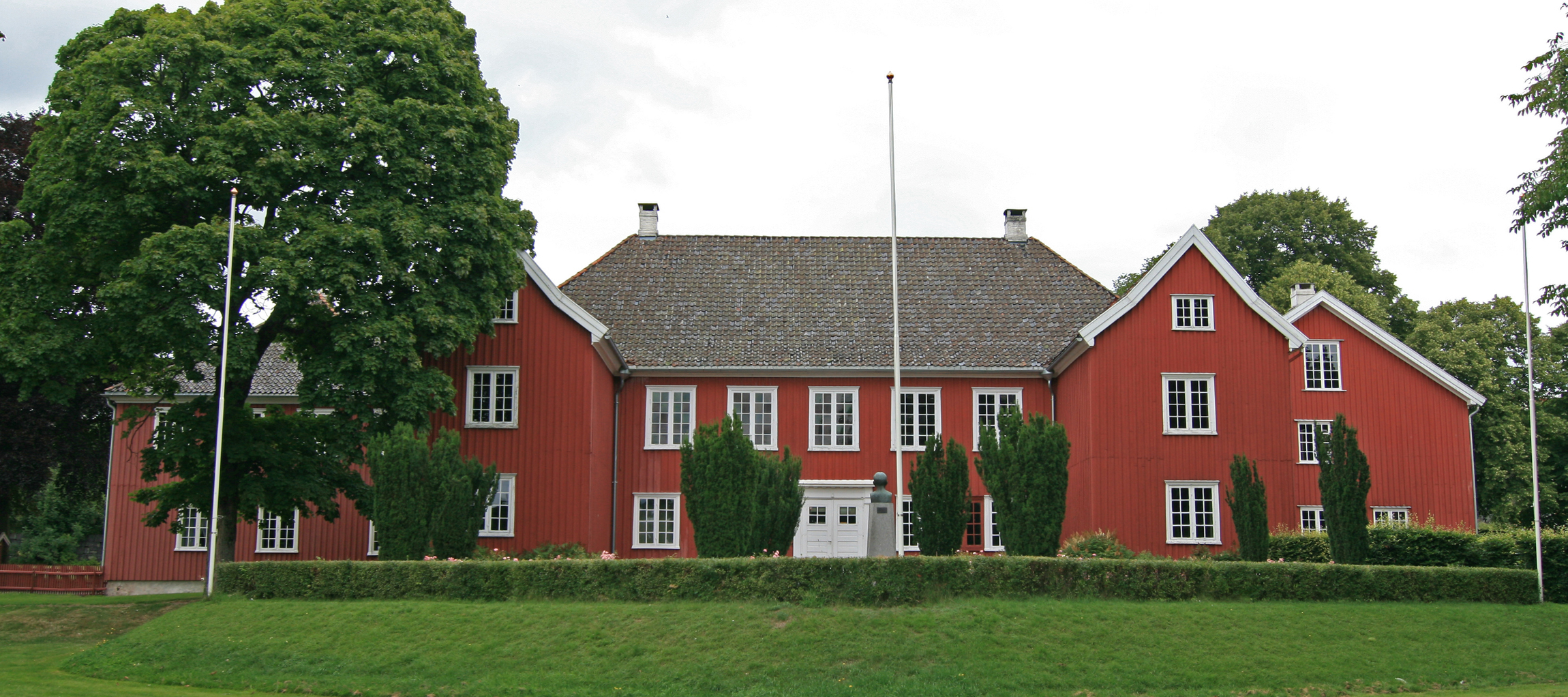
Herregården is one of Norway's best preserved wooden structures.

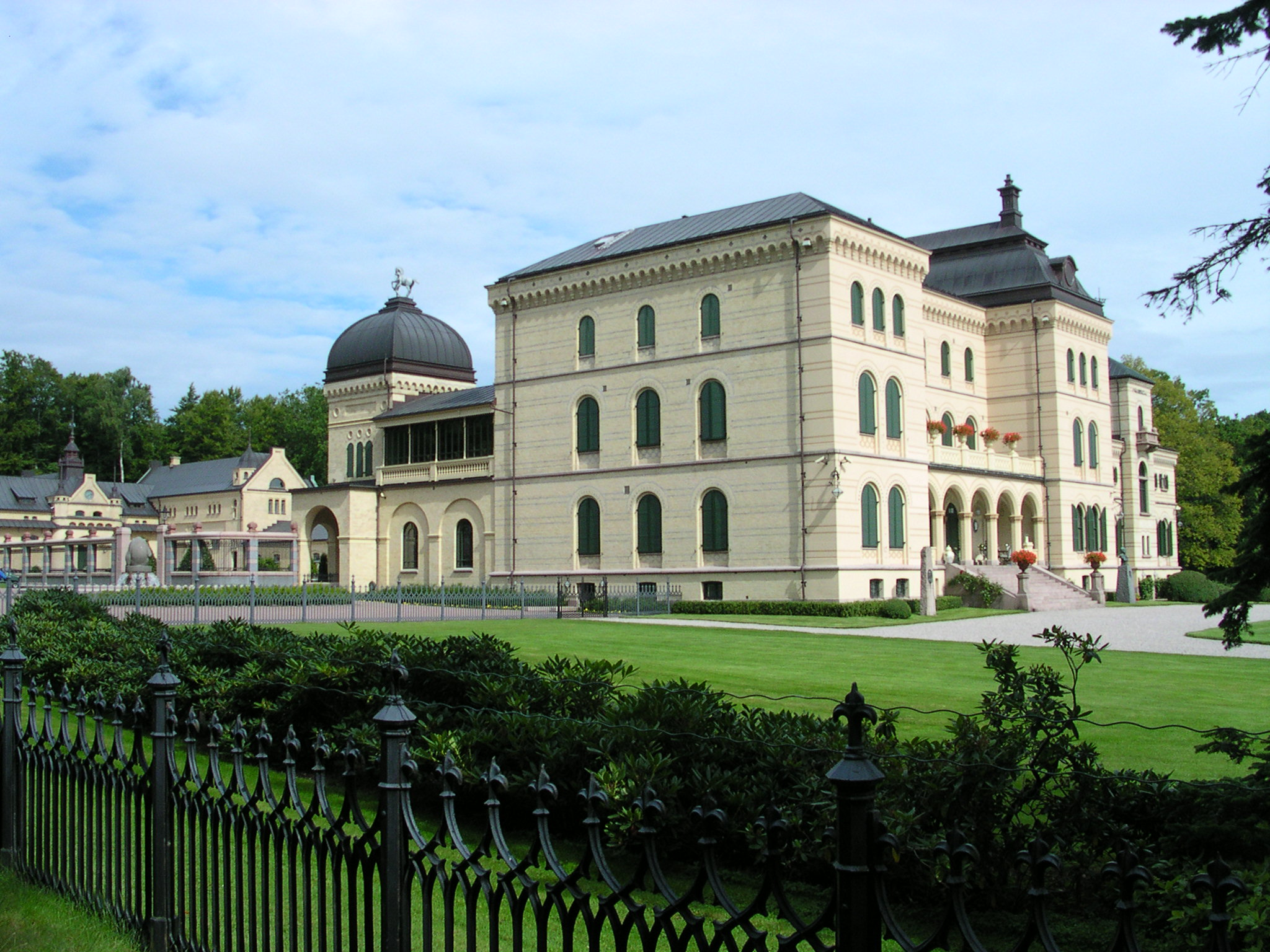
Fritzøehus is the largest privately owned estate in Norway.

Manor House (Herregården) was built by Ulrik Fredrik Gyldenløve for his third wedding in 1677. It is a large wooden structure with well-preserved baroque interiors from the 1730s. Herregården manor house is a large Baroque wooden building with classic elements. The interior design is mainly Baroque and Regency style. The house is filled with 17th- and 18th-century antiques. Herregården from 1677 is considered one of Norway's finest secular Baroque structures. It is one of few baroque architectural monuments representing nobility in Norway. Furthermore, it is one of Norway's largest wooden buildings from 17th century.

The Larvik Maritime Museum (Larvik Sjøfartsmuseum) is housed in Larvik's oldest brick building, dating from 1730. Larvik Maritime Museum is located in the old customs house, and is the residence of the local building inspector. This museum displays models of ships, paintings of sailing vessels, and other nautical artifacts to bring the port's maritime history alive. One section of the museum is devoted to the expeditions of Larvik-born Thor Heyerdahl.

=== Fritzøehus ===
Fritzøehus is a private estate located in Larvik. The estate has traditionally been associated with various members of the Treschow family and is presently owned by Mille-Marie Treschow. It is Norway's largest privately owned estate.

=== Churches ===
The Church of Norway has twelve parishes (sokn) within Larvik Municipality. It is part of the Larvik prosti (deanery) in the Diocese of Tunsberg.

Churches in Larvik Municipality
Parish (sokn)	Church name	Location of the church	Year built
Berg	Berg Arbeidskirke	Helgeroa	2007
Berg	Berg Church	Berg	1878
Berg	Old Berg Church	Berg	c. 1100
Hedrum	Hedrum Church	Hedrum	c. 1100
Hvarnes	Hvarnes Church	Hvarnes	1705
Kjose	Kjose Church	Kjose	1850
Kvelde	Kvelde Church	Kvelde	1871
Lardal	Hem Church	Hem	c. 1100
Lardal	Styrvoll Church	Styrvoll	c. 1150
Lardal	Svarstad Church	Svarstad	1657
Larvik	Larvik Church	Larvik	1677
Larvik	Langestrand Church	Larvik	1818
Nanset	Nanset Church	Larvik	1974
Stavern	Fredriksvern Church	Stavern	1756
Tanum	Tanum Church	Tanum	c. 1100
Tjølling	Tjølling Church	Tjøllingvollen	c. 1100
Østre Halsen	Østre Halsen Church	Halsen in Larvik	1983

== Points of interest ==
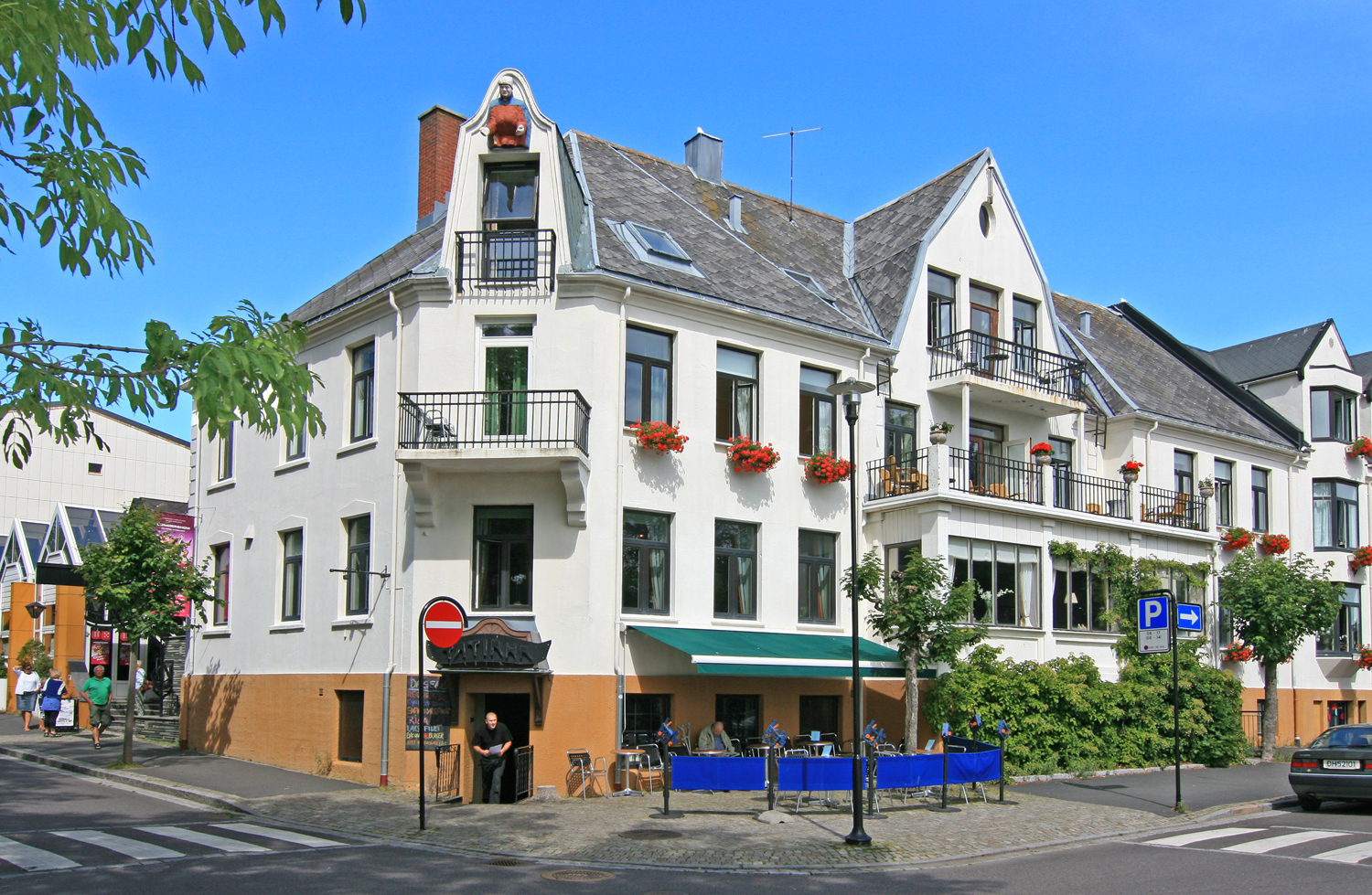
Stavern is a summer resort community.

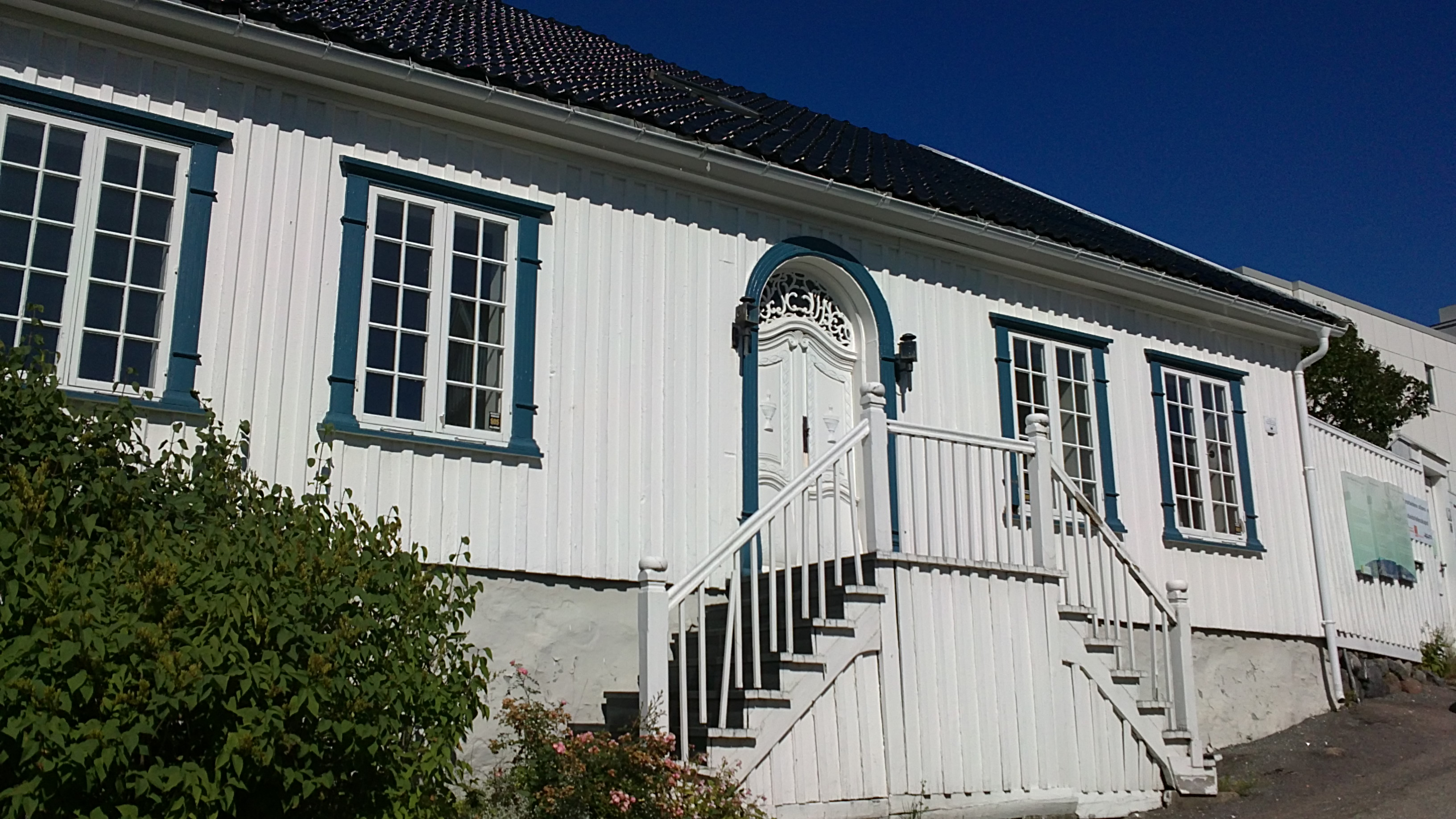
Childhood home of Thor Heyerdahl.

Notable points of interest include:

- Istrehågan, ancient burial ground on the Larvik-Sandefjord border
- Bøkeskogen, Norway's largest and the world's northernmost beech tree forest.
- Larvik Maritime Museum, museum dedicated to Larvik's nautical history. It is home to several models by Colin Archer, and has its own exhibition dedicated to Thor Heyerdahl.
- Helgeroa and Nevlunghavn, adjacent coastal villages
- Kaupang in Skiringssal, remains from the oldest Nordic town yet discovered.
- Mølen, first UNESCO Global Geopark in the Nordic countries. It is home to 230 cairns dating to the Iron Age.
- Farris Lake, largest lake in Vestfold County.
- Stavern, coastal town and former home of Norway's main naval base in Fredriksvern
  - Hall of Remembrance, largest monument in Vestfold County.
  - Citadel Island, fort which came to prominence during the Nordic War of 1709–1720.
- Farris Bad, built next to Larvik's best sandy beach, Farris Bad is named amongst the best spas in Europe by Lonely Planet Publications.
- The Nesjar Monument, located in Helgeroa, made on the 1,000th anniversary for the Battle of Nesjar. First unveiled July 29, 2016.
- Herregården, erected in 1677 and recognised as one of Norway's finest secular Baroque structures.
- Larvik Church, erected in 1877 and situated at Tollerodden. Famous for its paintings.
- Childhood home of Thor Heyerdahl, located at Steingata 7 in Larvik proper.
- Goksjø, third-largest lake in Vestfold County, located on the Sandefjord-Larvik border. Used for swimming, fishing, kayaking, ice-skating, and skiing.

== Gallery ==
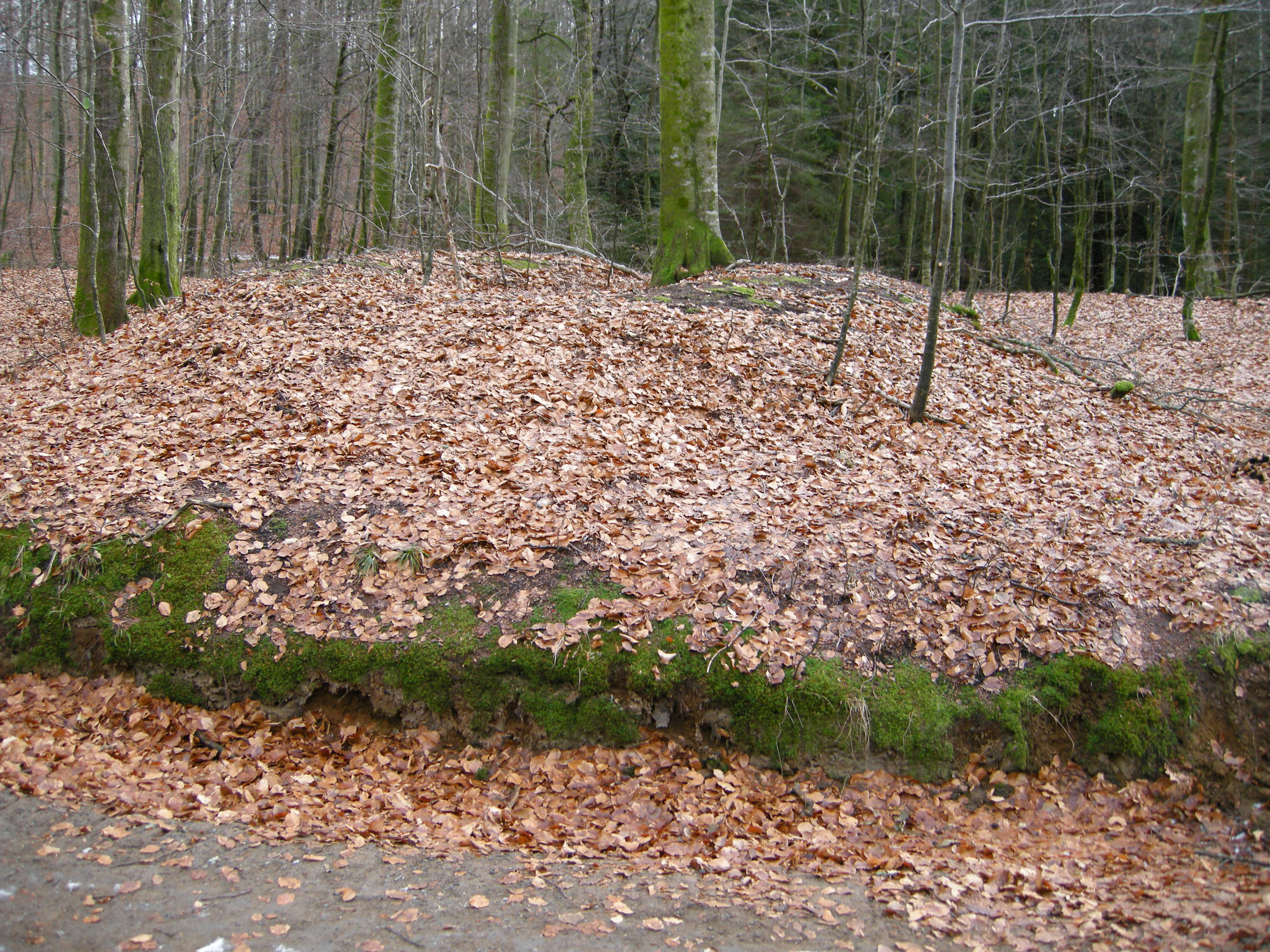
Burial mound in Bøkeskogen.

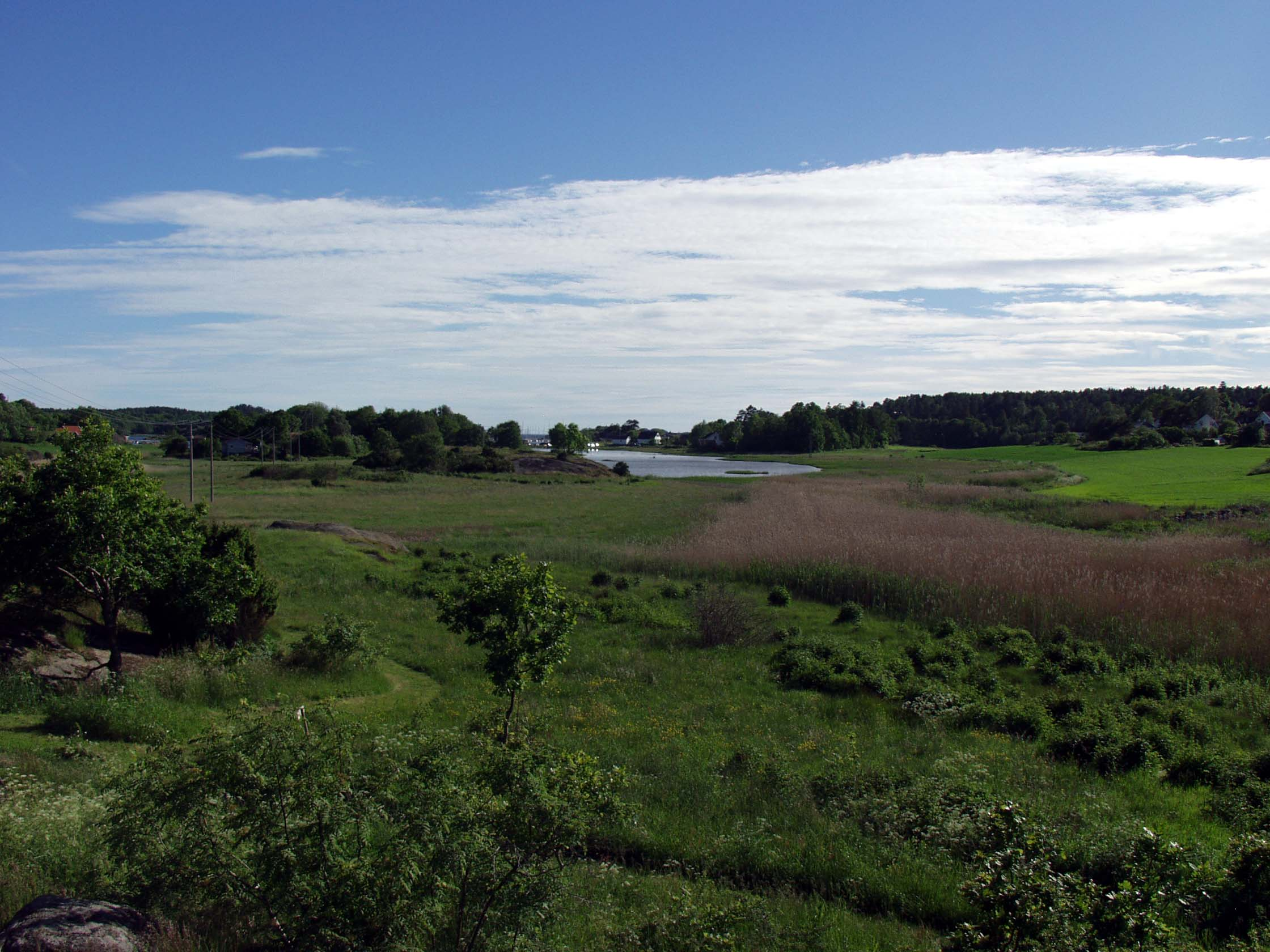
Kaupang is the oldest town in Norway.

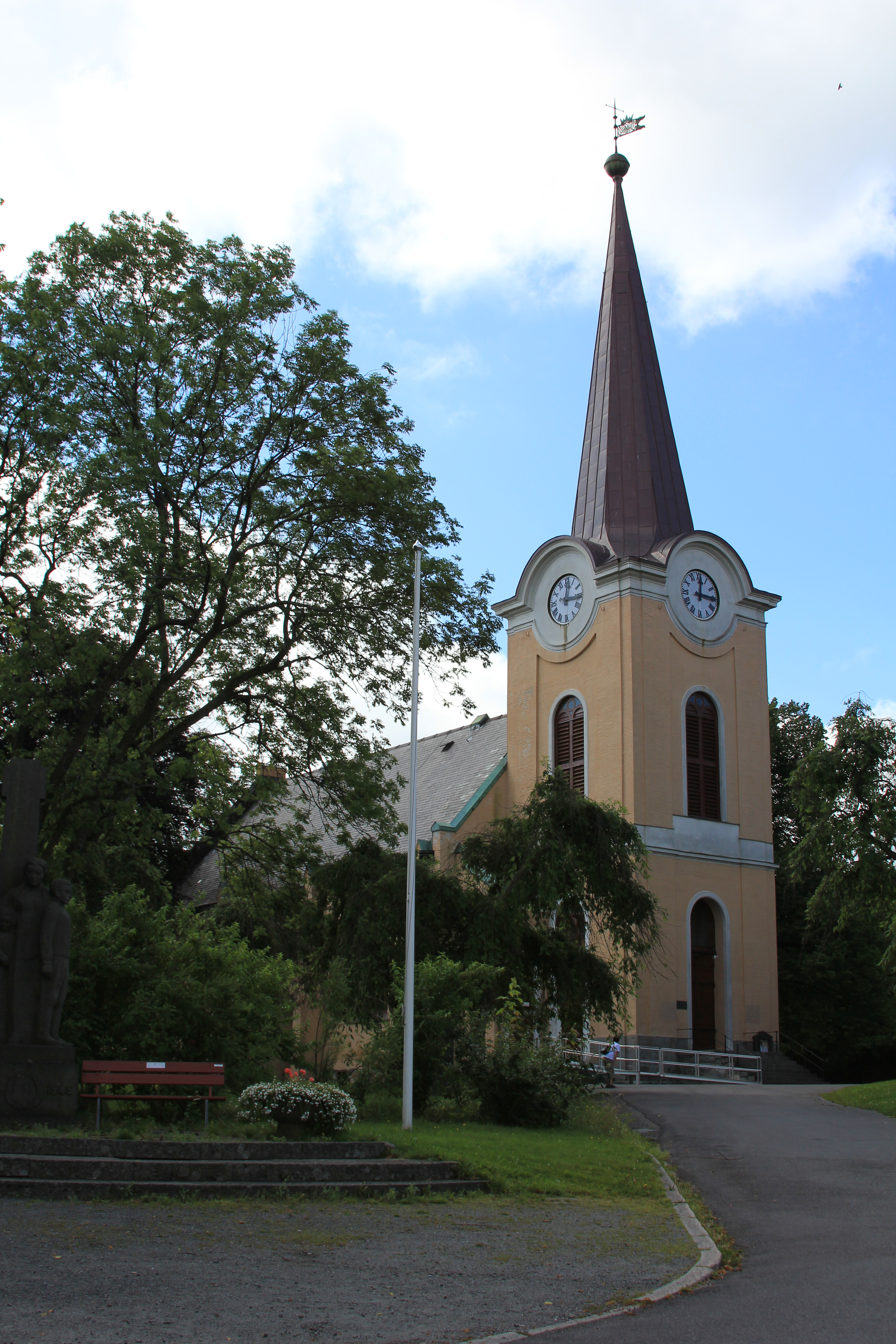
Larvik Church.

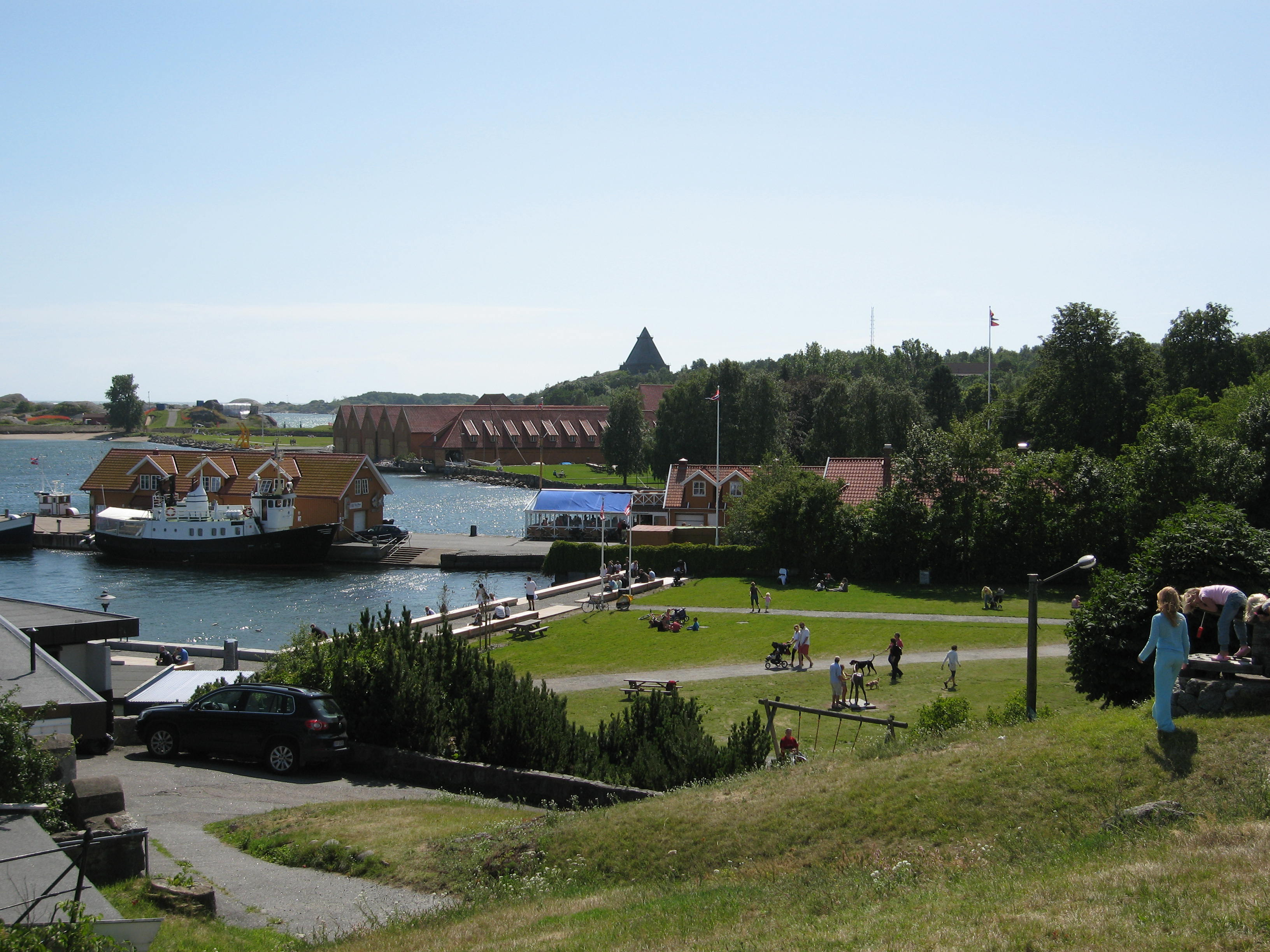
Fredriksvern in Stavern.

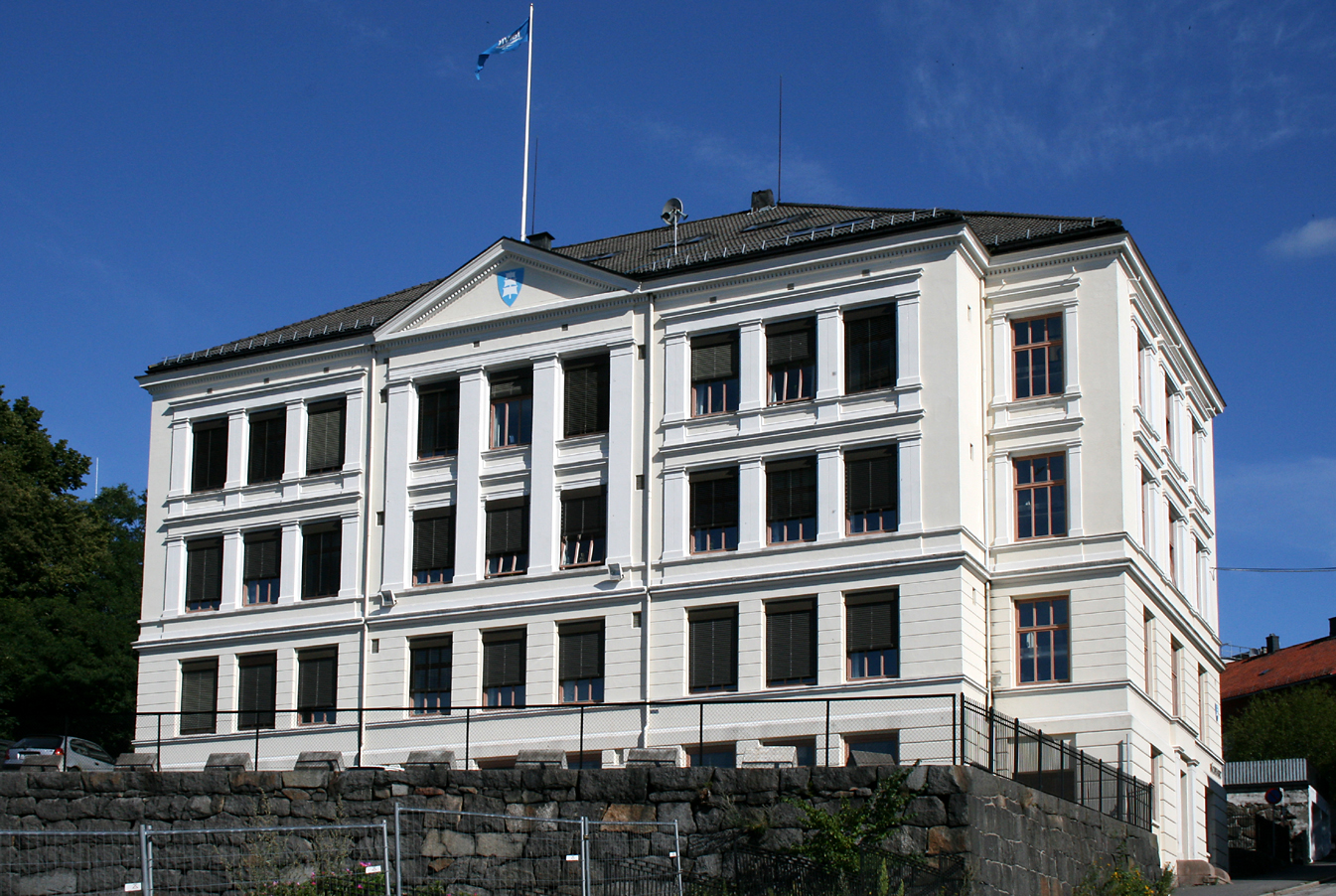
Former Larvik Town Hall.

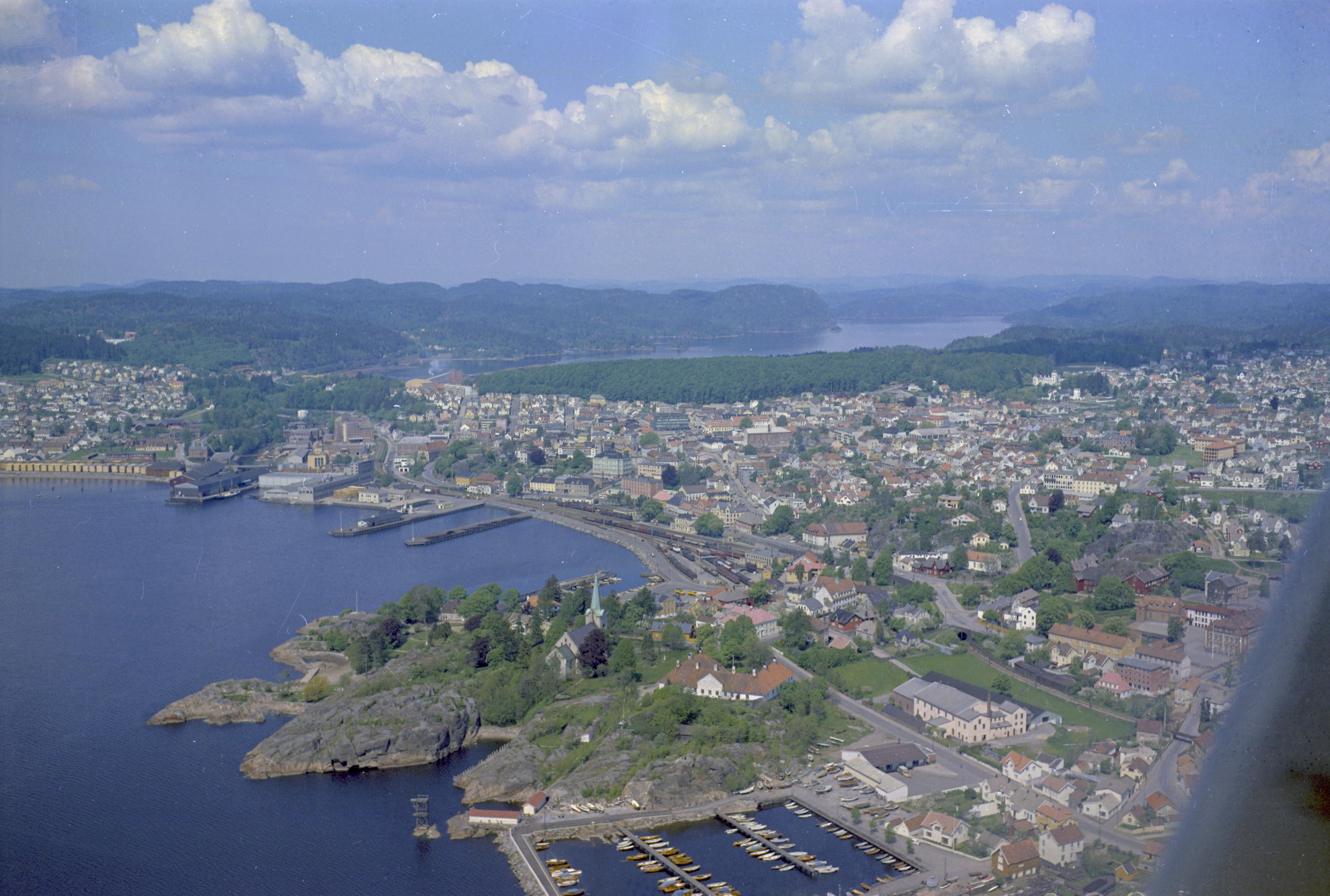
Widerøe aerial photo, 1964.

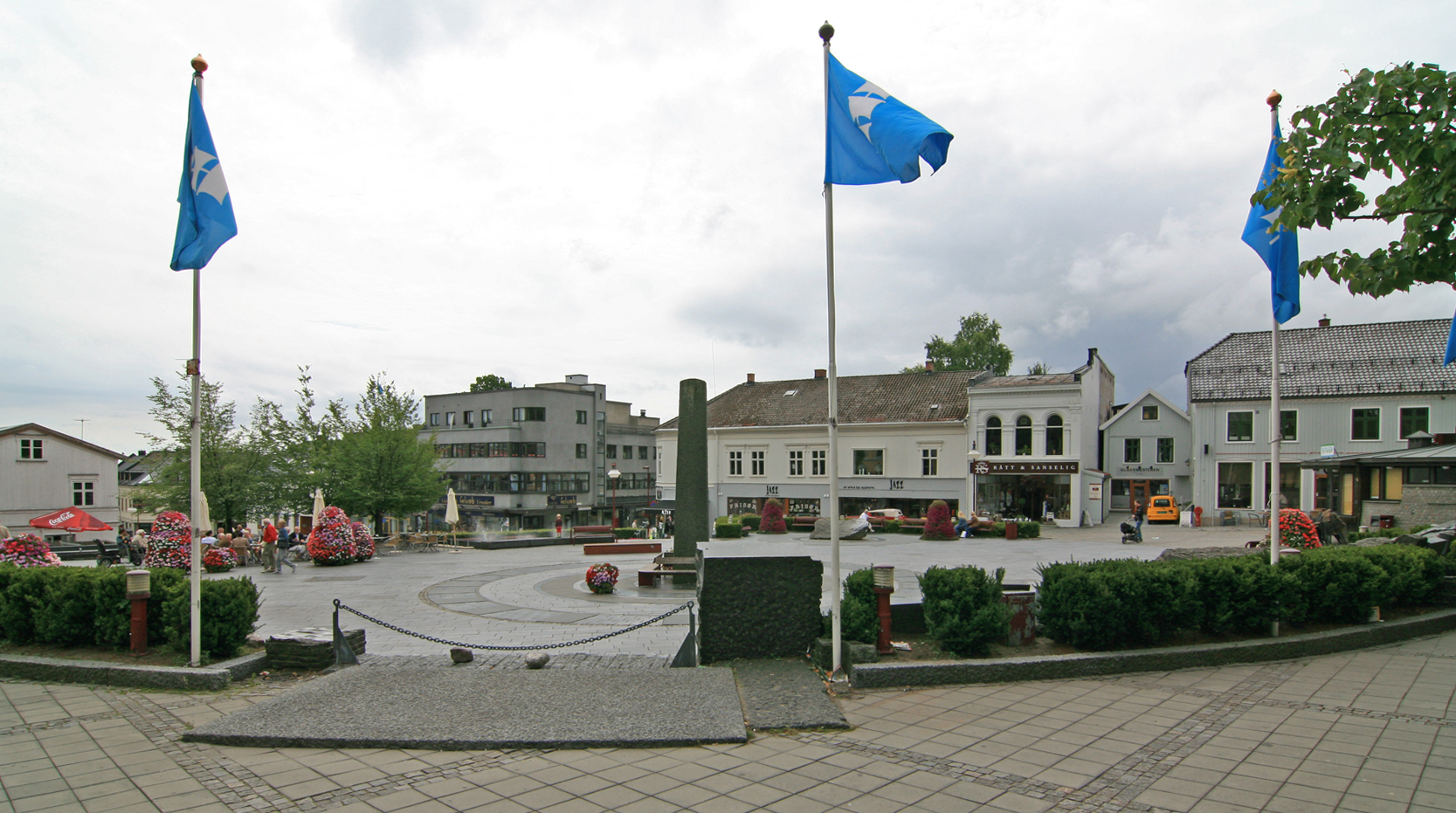
Larvik City Centre.

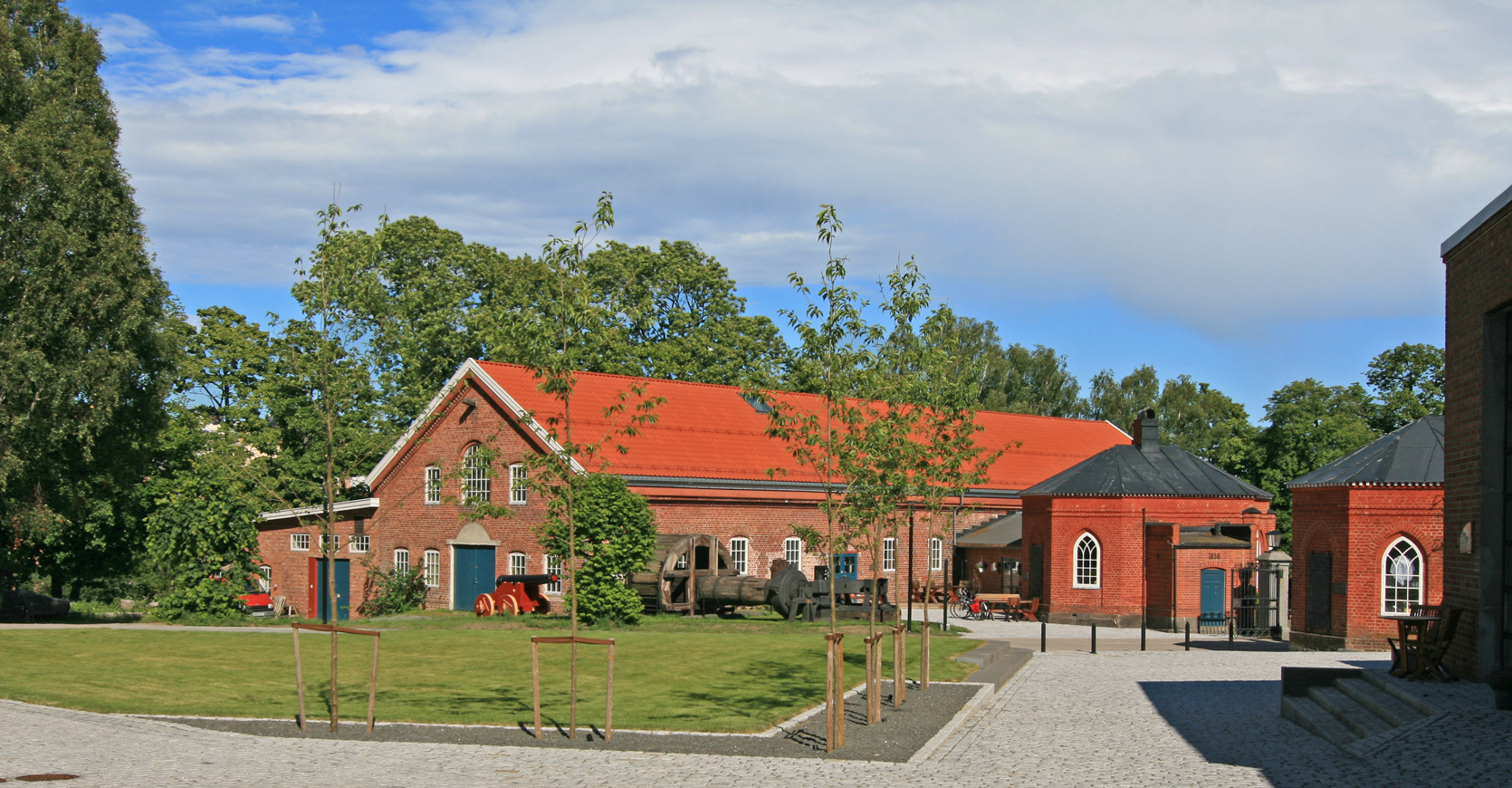
Larvik Maritime Museum.

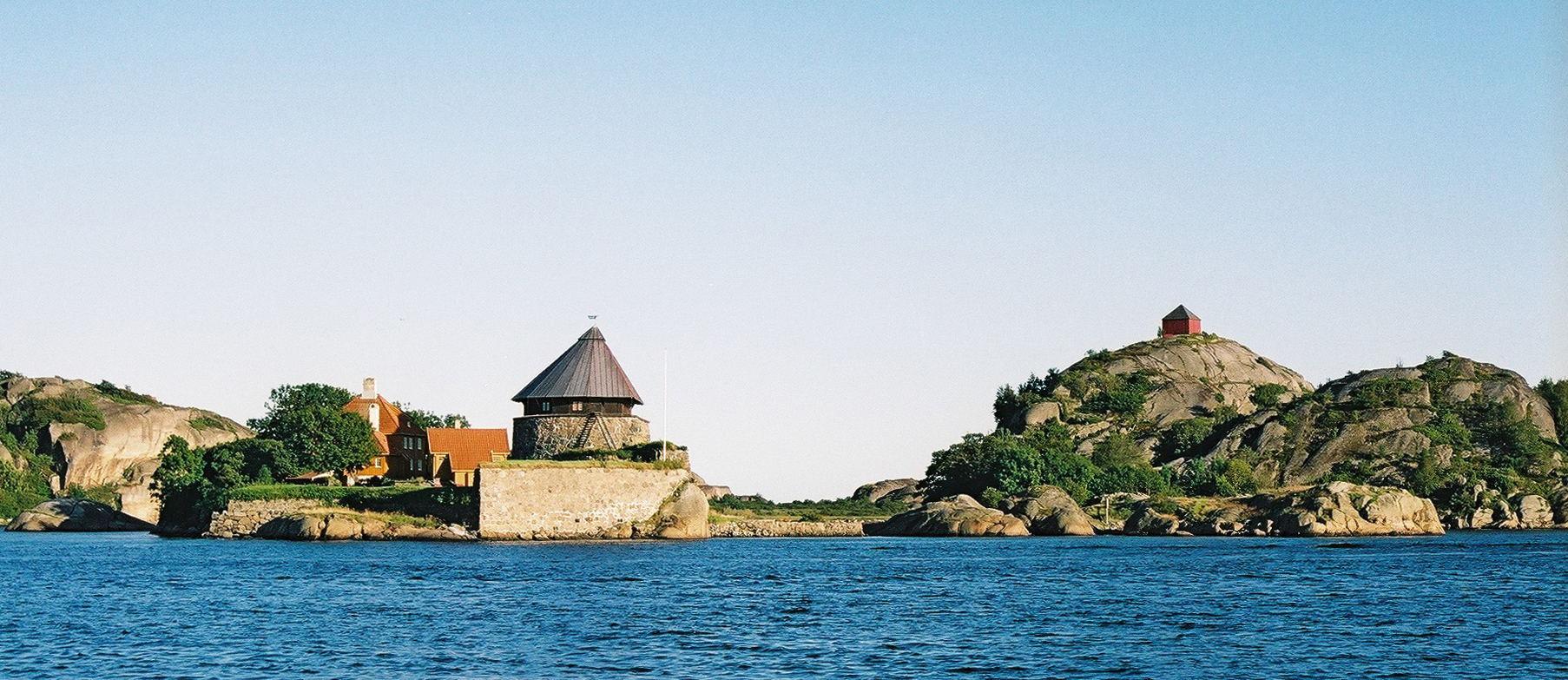
Citadel Island.

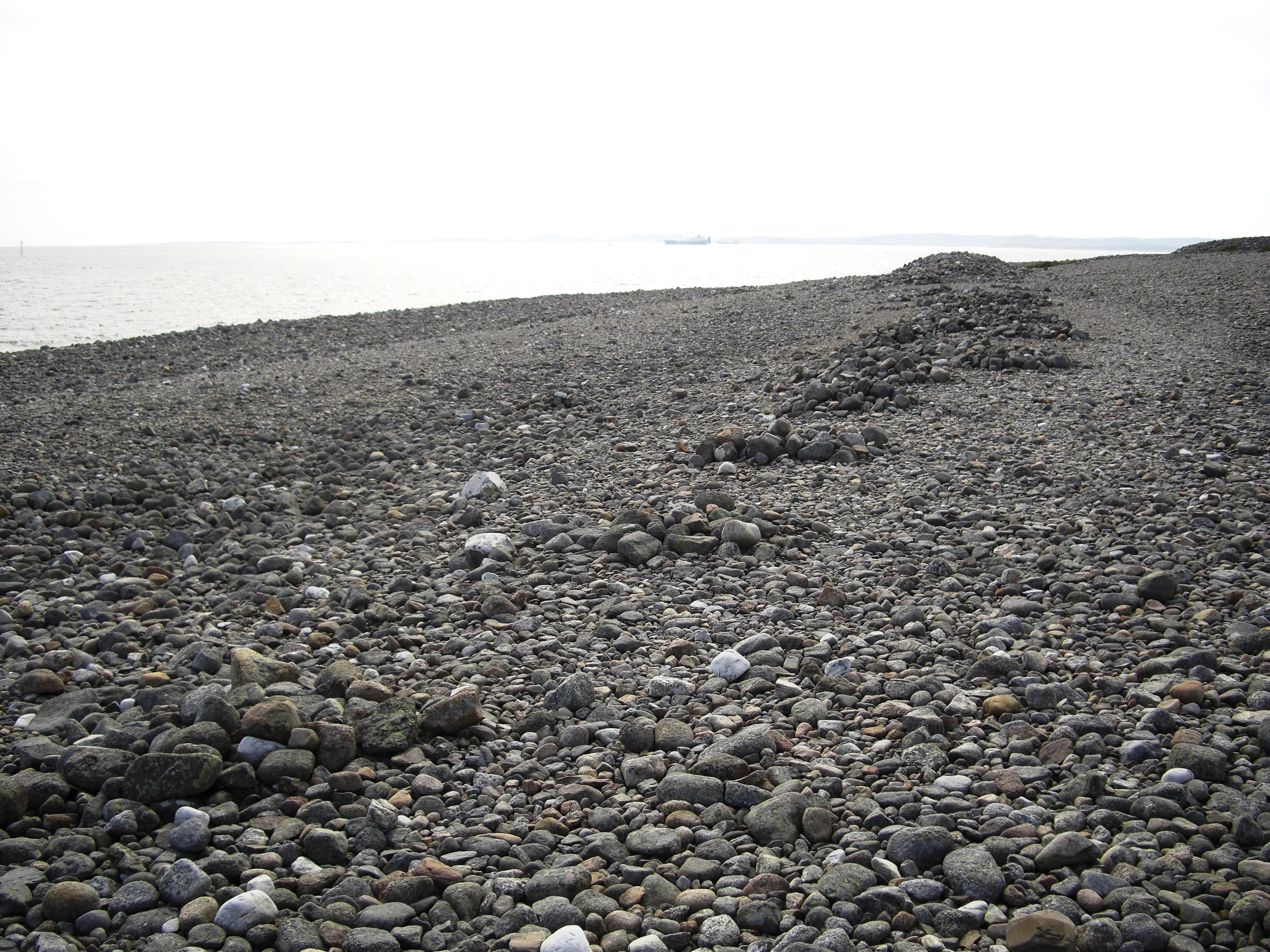
Mølen is Norway's longest stone beach.

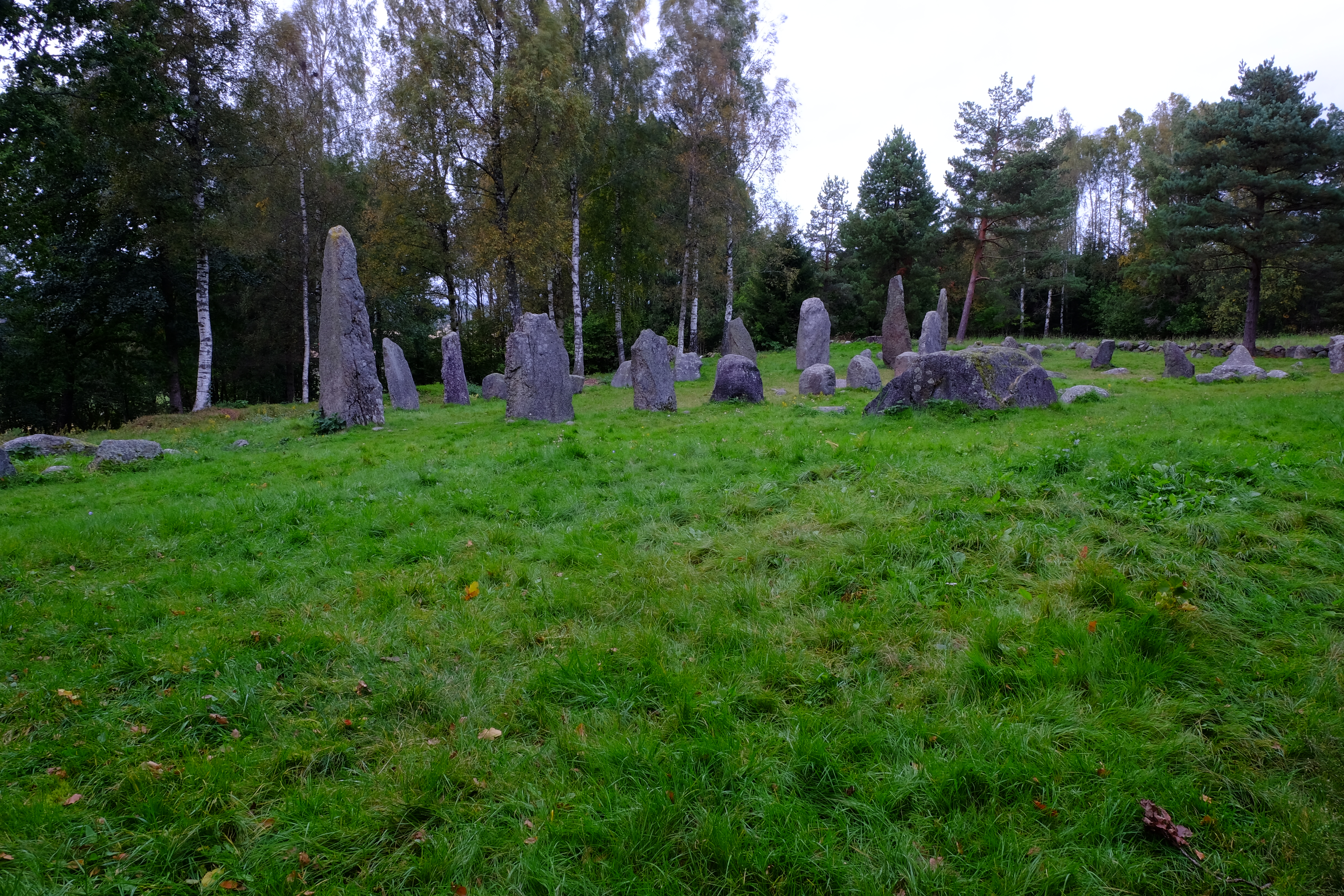
Rock settings at Istrehågan resemble a ship.

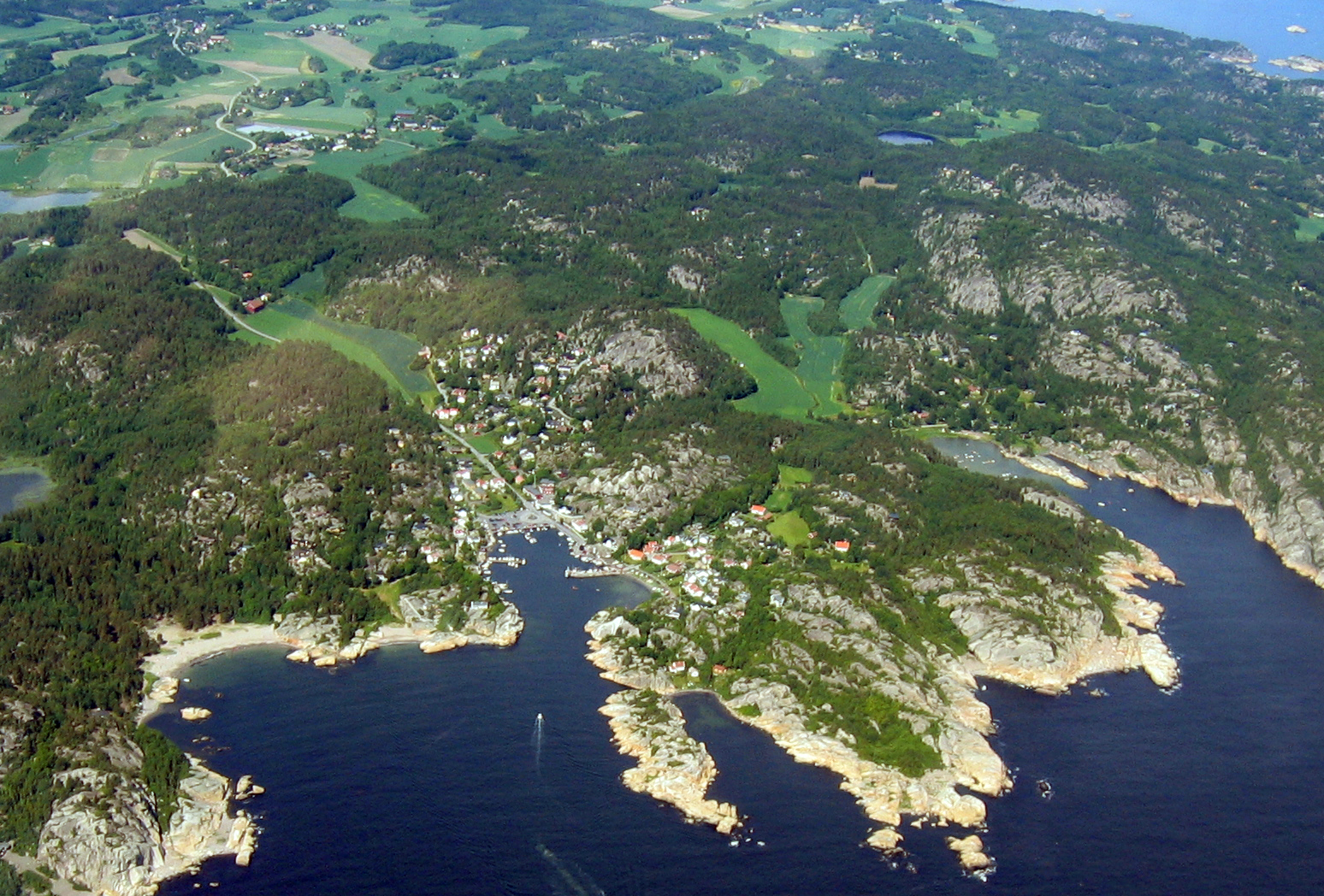
Ula, Norway.

== Notable people ==
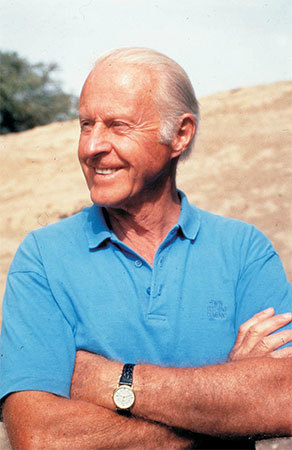
Thor Heyerdahl sailed 8,000 kilometres (5,000 mi) across the Pacific Ocean during the Kon-Tiki expedition.

=== Honorary citizens ===
- Thor Heyerdahl (1914–2002), an adventurer and ethnographer
- Carl Nesjar (1920–2015), a painter, sculptor, and graphic artist who worked with Pablo Picasso
- Antonio Bibalo (1922–2008), an Italian-Norwegian pianist who composed classical operas
- Arne Nordheim (1931–2010), a composer
- Ingvar Ambjørnsen (1956–2025), a writer

=== Explorers ===
- Johan Bryde (1858–1925), a ship-owner and whaler
- Carl Anton Larsen (1860–1924), an Antarctic explorer who discovered fossils
- Oscar Wisting (1871–1936), a Norwegian Naval officer and polar explorer
- Erik Hesselberg (1914-1972), a Kon-Tiki crew member, author, painter, and sculptor
- Jarle Andhøy (born 1977), a controversial adventurer and sailing skipper

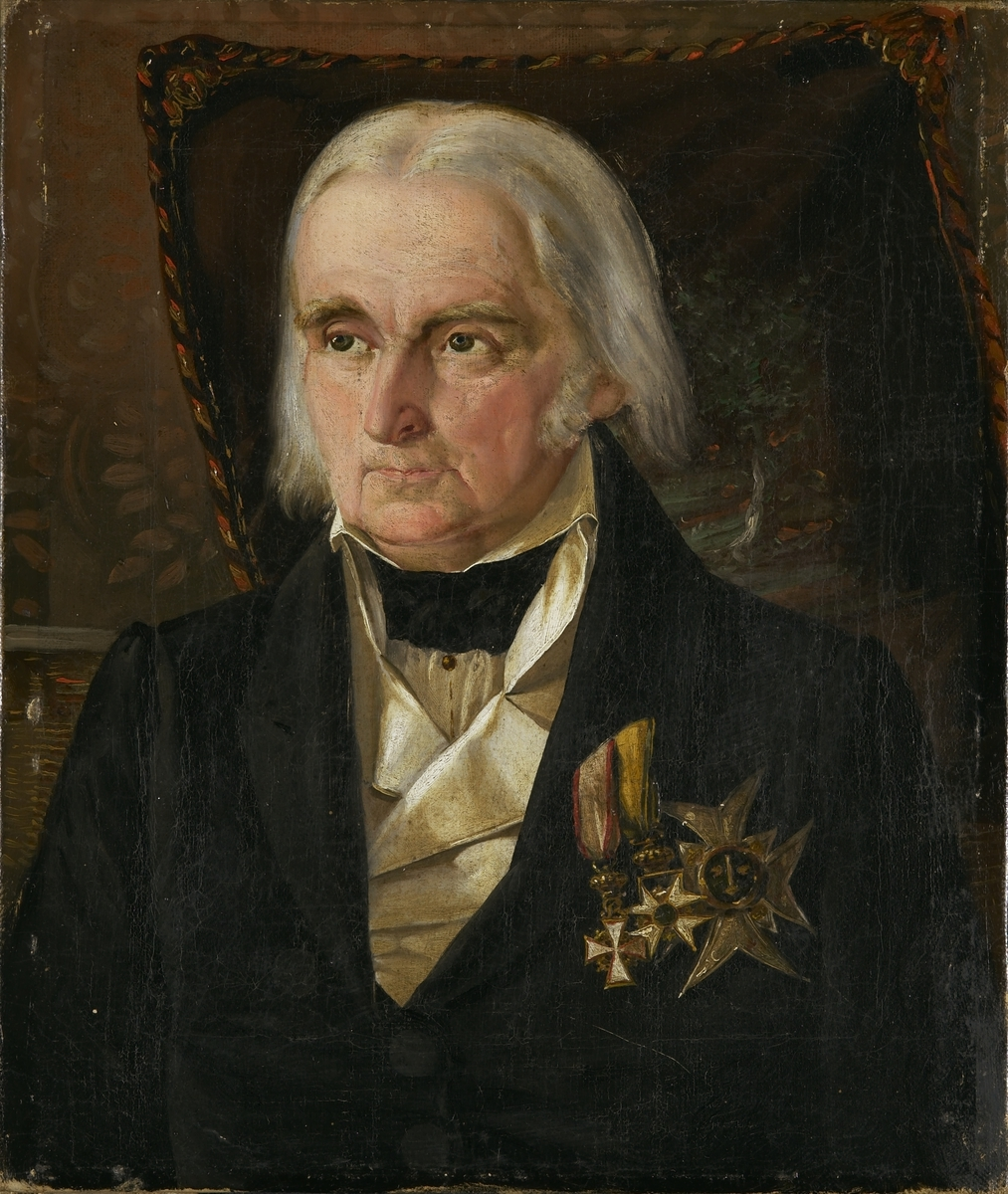
Jens Schou Fabricius

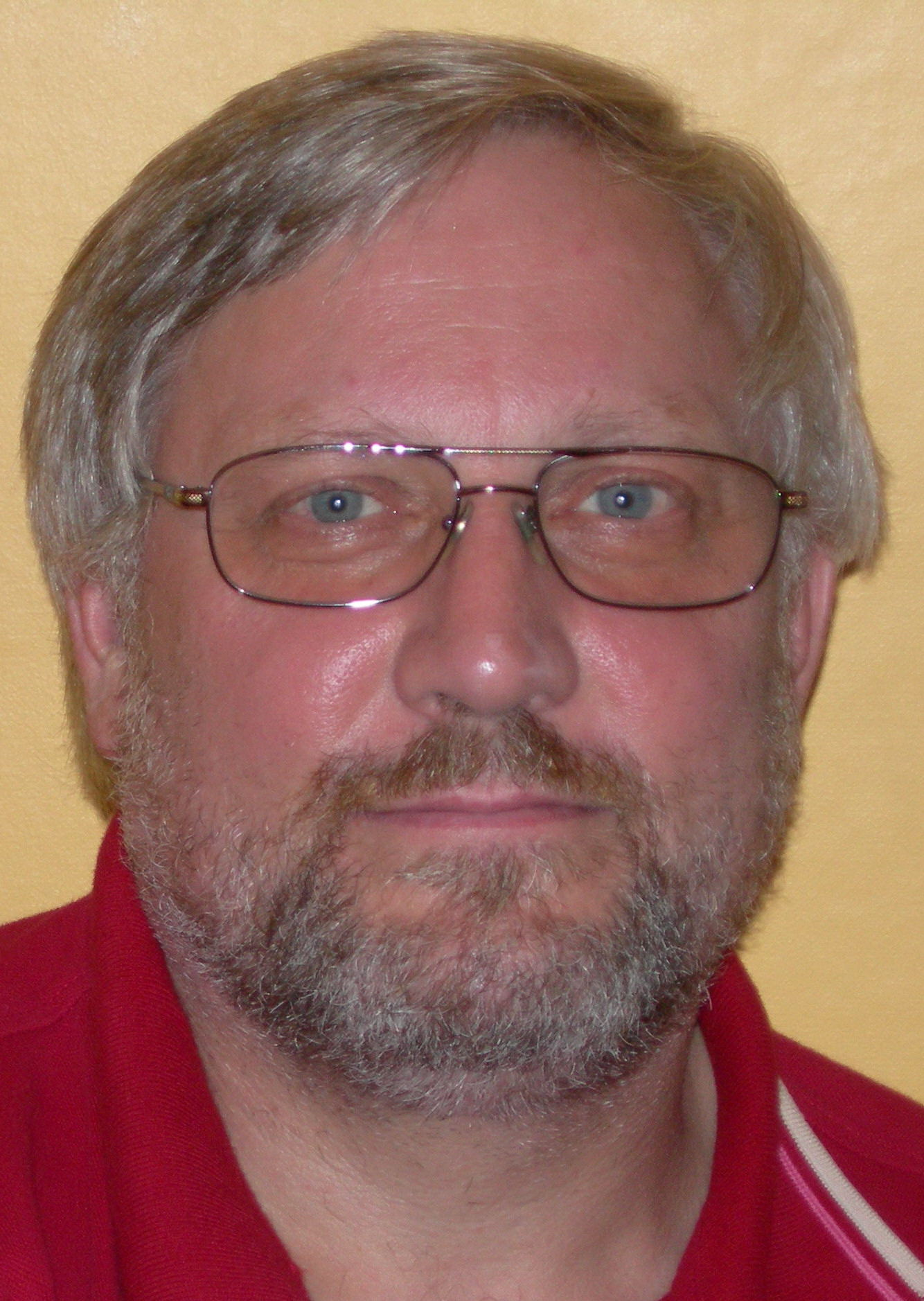
Lars Gule, 2006

=== Public Service & public thinking ===
- Jens Schou Fabricius (1758–1841), a Vice-admiral and Norwegian Minister of the Navy from 1817–1818
- Friderich Adolph von Schleppegrell (1792–1850), a Dano-Norwegian military officer
- Johan Sverdrup (1816–1892), a politician who was Prime Minister of Norway from 1884-1889
- Thomas Archer (1823-1905), an Australian pastoralist and Agent General for Queensland
- Colin Archer (1832–1921), a Norwegian naval architect and shipbuilder
- Sophus Bugge (1833–1907) a philologist and linguist
- Karl Gether Bomhoff (1842–1925), a pharmacist, politician, and Governor of Norges Bank
- Bertrand Narvesen (1860–1939), a businessman who founded Narvesen
- Bernt Berntsen (1863–1933), a Norwegian-American Protestant Christian missionary to China
- Anna Hvoslef (1866–1954), a journalist, politician, and feminist
- Adolf Fonahn (1873–1940), a physician, medical historian, and orientalist
- Niels Christian Ditleff (1881–1956), a diplomat and architect of White Buses operation
- Erling Utnem (1920–2006), a theologian, priest, and Bishop of Agder from 1973-1983
- Herman Sachnowitz (1921-1978), one of the few Norwegian Jews who survived deportation to a concentration camp
- Knut Helle (1930–2015), a historian and academic
- Mille-Marie Treschow (born 1954–2018), a landlord and businessperson
- Lars Gule (born 1955), a philosopher and commentator on extremism and terrorism
- Anders Anundsen (born 1975), a politician who was Minister of Justice from 2013-2016
- Hassan Abdi Dhuhulow (1990–2013), a Norwegian-Somalian Islamist terrorist

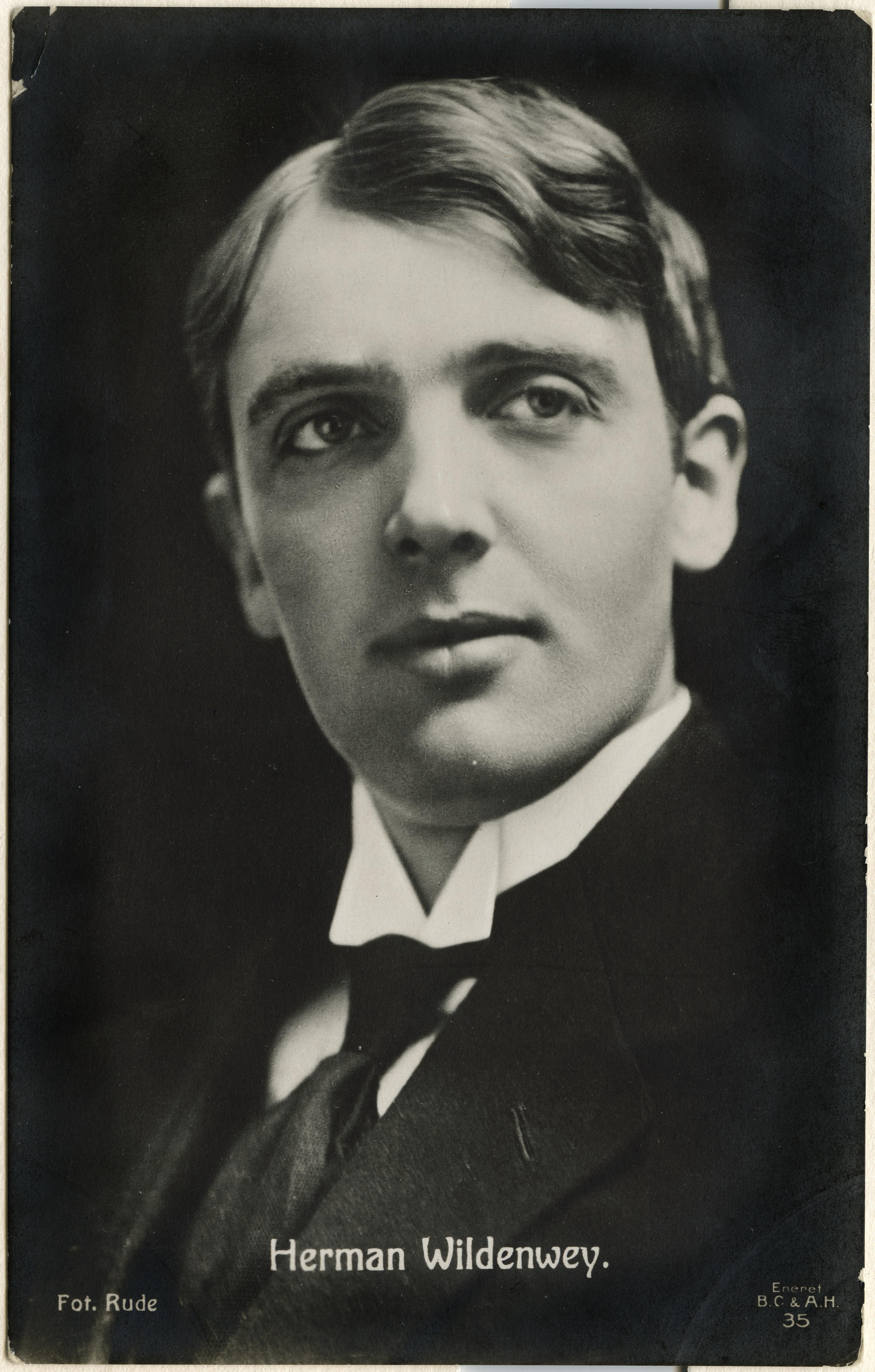
Herman Wildenwey

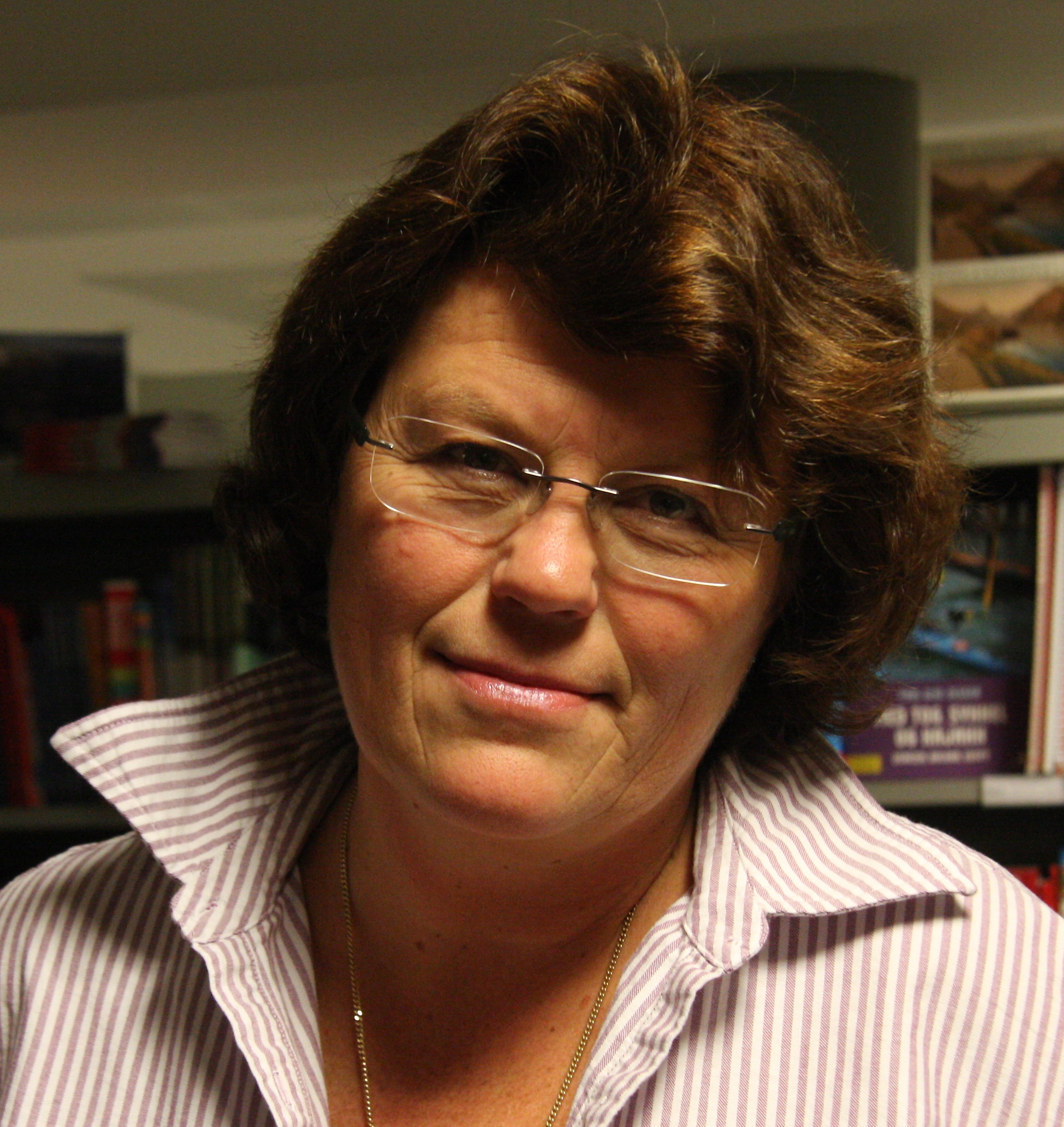
Anne Holt, 2009

=== The arts ===
- Cecil Aagaard (1916–1984), a jazz vocalist and band leader
- Absolute Steel (formed in 1999), a heavy metal band
- Mari Bjørgan (1950–2014), an actress and variety show comedian
- Birgitte Einarsen (born in 1975), a singer and musical theatre artist from Helgeroa
- Terje Gewelt (born 1960), a jazz musician who plays the upright bass who was raised in Larvik
- Hans Holmen (1878–1958), a painter and sculptor
- Anne Holt (born 1958), a crime writer, lawyer, and former minister of justice
- Louis Jacoby (born 1942), a singer and writer
- Ruth Lagesen (1914–2005), a pianist and conductor
- Bjørn Lynne (born 1966), a sound engineer and music composer
- Carl Nesjar (1920–2015), a painter, sculptor, graphic artist, and fabricator for Pablo Picasso
- Arne Nordheim (1931–2010), a composer
- Arthur Omre (1887–1967), a novelist, liquor smuggler, swindler, and thief
- Gunnar Reiss-Andersen (1896–1964), a lyric poet and author
- Jonas Kilmork Vemøy (born 1986), a jazz trumpeter and composer who was raised in Larvik
- Herman Wildenvey (1885–1959), a poet

=== Sport ===
- Sverre Hansen (1913–1974), a footballer who was a team bronze medallist at the 1936 Summer Olympics
- Gunnar Thoresen (1920-2017), a famous footballer who had 261 caps for Larvik Turn and 64 for Norway
- Anette Bøe (born 1957), a cross-country skier who was a team bronze medallist at the 1980 Winter Olympics
- Hallvar Thoresen (born 1957), a footballer with 320 club caps and 50 for Norway
- Tom Erik Oxholm (born 1959), a speed skater and twice bronze medallist at the 1980 Winter Olympics
- Tom Sundby (born 1960), a footballer with 39 caps for Norway
- Bjørg Eva Jensen (born 1960), a speed skater and gold medallist at the 1980 Winter Olympics
- Gunnar Halle (born 1965), a football manager and player with 509 club caps and 64 for Norway
- Espen Hoff (born 1981), a retired professional footballer with 427 club caps
- Alexander Hvaal (born 1992), a professional rallycross driver

== Sports teams ==
- Larvik HK (handball)
- Larvik TIF
- IF Fram Larvik

== Twin towns – sister cities ==
Larvik has sister city agreements with the following places:

- Borlänge, Sweden
- Frederikshavn, Denmark

== See also ==
- Mølen
- Larvikite
