= Hedrum Municipality =

Former municipality in Vestfold, Norway

Hedrum Municipality Hedrum kommune
- Former municipality
- Hedrum herred (historic name)
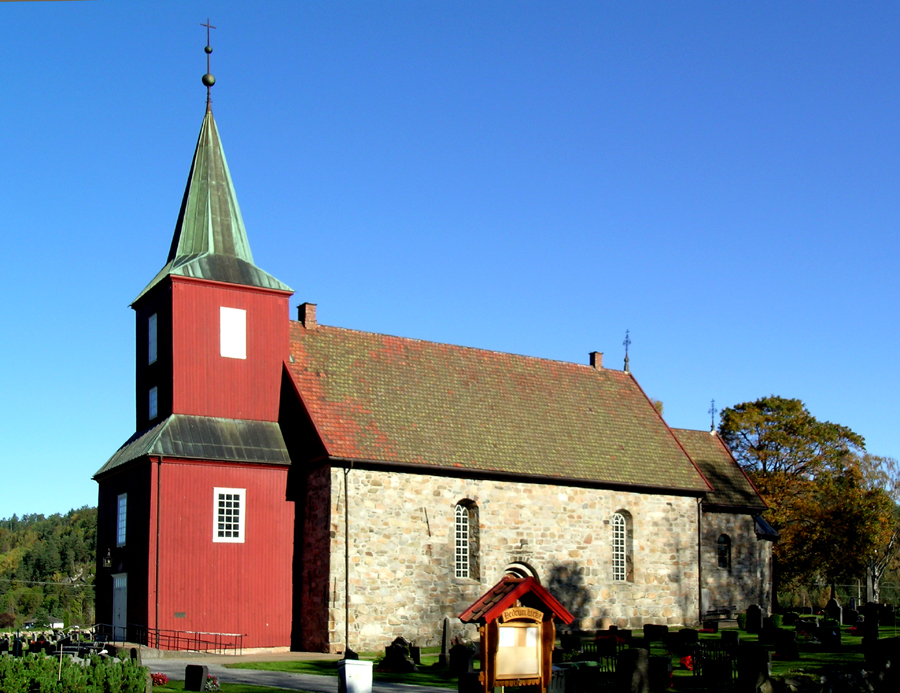
- View of the local Hedrum Church

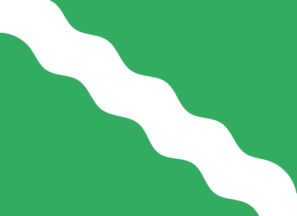
- Flag Coat of arms

- Vestfold within Norway

- Hedrum within Vestfold
- Coordinates: 59°07′24″N 10°03′35″E
- Country: Norway
- County: Vestfold
- Established: 1 Jan 1838
  - Created as: Formannskapsdistrikt
- Disestablished: 1 Jan 1988
  - Succeeded by: Larvik Municipality
- Administrative centre: Hedrum (1838-1952); Nanset (1952-1988)

Government
  - Mayor (1986–1987): Per Michaelsen (H)

Area (upon dissolution)
  - Total: 264.3 km^{2} (102.0 sq mi)
  - Rank: #290 in Norway
- Highest elevation (Berganvarden): 456.5 m (1,498 ft)

Population (1987)
  - Total: 10,449
  - Rank: #96 in Norway
  - Density: 39.5/km^{2} (102/sq mi)
  - Change (10 years): ▲ +14.4%
- Demonym: Hedrumssokning

Official language
  - Norwegian form: Bokmål
- Time zone: UTC+01:00 (CET)
  - Summer (DST): UTC+02:00 (CEST)
- ISO 3166 code: NO-0727

Hedrum (Norwegian pronunciation: [ˈheːdrʉm]; locally [ˈhæːdɽʉm]) is a former municipality in Vestfold county, Norway. The 264.3-square-kilometre (102.0 sq mi) municipality existed from 1838 until its dissolution in 1988. The area is now part of Larvik Municipality. The administrative centre was the village of Nanset (from 1978-1988; prior to that, the municipal administration was located in the village of Hedrum where the Hedrum Church is located). Other villages in Hedrum include Gjone, Kvelde, Skinmo, and Verningen.

Prior to its dissolution in 1988, the 264.3-square-kilometre (102.0 sq mi) municipality was the 290th largest by area out of the 454 municipalities in Norway. Hedrum Municipality was the 96th most populous municipality in Norway with a population of about 10,449. The municipality's population density was 39.5 inhabitants per square kilometre (102/sq mi) and its population had increased by 14.4% over the previous 10-year period.

== General information ==
=== Administrative history ===
The formannskapsdistrikt law of 1837 created a system of local government in Norway by establishing each town (ladested or kjøpstad) and each Church of Norway prestegjeld as a civil municipality. On 1 January 1838, Hedrum prestegjeld was established as Hedrum Municipality.

Over the years, there have been many municipal border adjustments. On 1 January 1875, an area of Hedrum Municipality (population: 46) became part of the neighboring Larvik Municipality. On 1 January 1878, an area of Hedrum Municipality (population: 61) became part of the neighboring Andebu Municipality. On 1 January 1891, an area of Tjølling Municipality (population: 11) became part of Hedrum Municipality. In 1937, an area of Hedrum Municipality (population: 69) became part of the neighboring Larvik Municipality. In 1948, an area of Hedrum Municipality (population: 296) became part of the neighboring Larvik Municipality.

During the 1960s, there were many municipal mergers across Norway due to the work of the Schei Committee. On 1 January 1964, two border adjustments were made to Hedrum Municipality. One area of Hedrum Municipality (population: 16) was transferred to Siljan Municipality (in Telemark county) and the adjacent Bakke area (population: 75) was transferred to Porsgrunn Municipality (also in Telemark county). On 1 January 1968, the unpopulated Svartangen area of Siljan Municipality was transferred to Hedrum Municipality (and Vestfold county).

On 1 January 1974 the unpopulated Tagtvedt area of Hedrum Municipality was transferred to the neighboring Larvik Municipality. On 1 January 1983, the unpopulated Bergan area of Hedrum Municipality was transferred to the neighboring Lardal Municipality. On 1 January 1986, part of the Åsveien 3 property in Hedrum Municipality was transferred to the neighboring Larvik Municipality. On 9 January 1987 an unpopulated area in northern Hedrum Municipality was transferred to Lardal Municipality.

On 1 January 1988, Hedrum Municipality was dissolved and the following areas were merged to form an enlarged Larvik Municipality with a population of people:

- all of Hedrum Municipality (population: 10,449)
- all of Brunlanes Municipality (population: 8,138)
- all of Larvik Municipality (population: 8,045)
- all of Stavern Municipality (population: 2,538)
- all of Tjølling Municipality (population: 7,878)

=== Name ===
The municipality is named after the old Hedrum prestegjeld. The prestegjeld was named after the old Hedrum farm (Old Norse: Heiðarheimr) since the first Hedrum Church was built there. The first element is the genitive case of the word heiðr which means "heath" or "moorland". The last element is heimr which means "home" or "abode".

=== Coat of arms ===
The coat of arms was granted on 18 November 1966. The official blazon is "Vert, a bend wavy argent" (Norwegian: På grønn bunn en sølv skråbjelke dannet ved bølgesnitt). This means the arms have a green field (background) and the charge is a wavy diagonal line. The charge has a tincture of argent which means it is commonly colored white, but if it is made out of metal, then silver is used. The green color in the field symbolizes the importance of the local forests and the wavy line was chosen to symbolize the river Numedalslågen which flows through the municipality. The arms were designed by D. Krohn-Holm, Jr. The municipal flag had the same design as the coat of arms.

=== Churches ===
The Church of Norway had three parishes (sokn) within Hedrum Municipality. At the time of the municipal dissolution, it was part of the Hedrum prestegjeld and the Larvik prosti (deanery) in the Diocese of Tunsberg.

Churches in Hedrum Municipality
| Parish (sokn) | Church name | Location of the church | Year built |
|---|---|---|---|
| Hedrum | Hedrum Church | Hedrum | c. 1100 |
| Hvarnes | Hvarnes Church | Hvarnes | 1705 |
| Kvelde | Kvelde Church | Kvelde | 1871 |

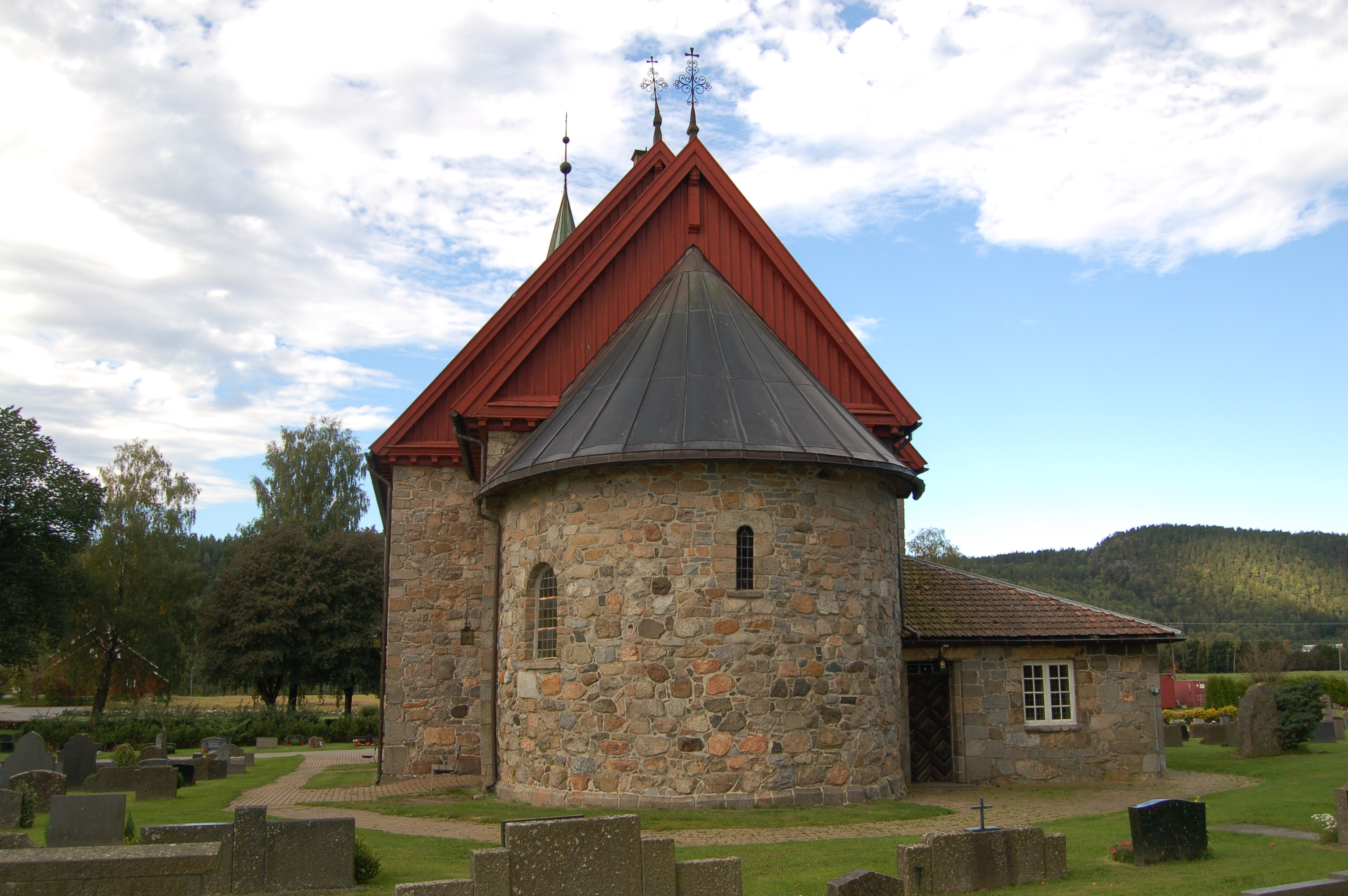
Hedrum Church

Hedrum Church (Hedrum Kirke) is a medieval era church that was the main church for the municipality. It is one of several ancient stone churches within a vicinity which also includes churches at Hem, as well as Efteløt and Hedenstad in Buskerud. Other churches in Hedrum include Kvelde Church and Hvarnes Church.

Hedrum Church was built of stone around 1100. The church celebrated its 950-year anniversary in 2010. The church has a rectangular nave, square choir and apse. Building Archaeological studies show that the apse is added later. The structure was extended by four meters in 1666. The west part with the portal and door openings are from after the Reformation. Hedrum Church has a number of tombstones, which cover large parts of the floor of the church. Hedrum Church cemetery is clearly visible from traffic arteries on both sides of Numedalslågen. Some of the graves are believed to pre-date the introduction of Christianity confirming the supposition that ancient pagan cult sites were chosen as the venue for the earlier churches.

== Geography ==
Hedrum Municipality was located in the Lågendalen valley, the lower part of the valley that follows the river Numedalslågen. The valley is relatively flat and dominated by agricultural areas. The valley is surrounded by wooded hills which rise up towards 500-metre (1,600 ft) tall mountain peaks. Among other things, the area is known for potato cultivation and fishing. The highest point in the municipality was the 456.5-metre (1,498 ft) tall mountain Bergenvarden.

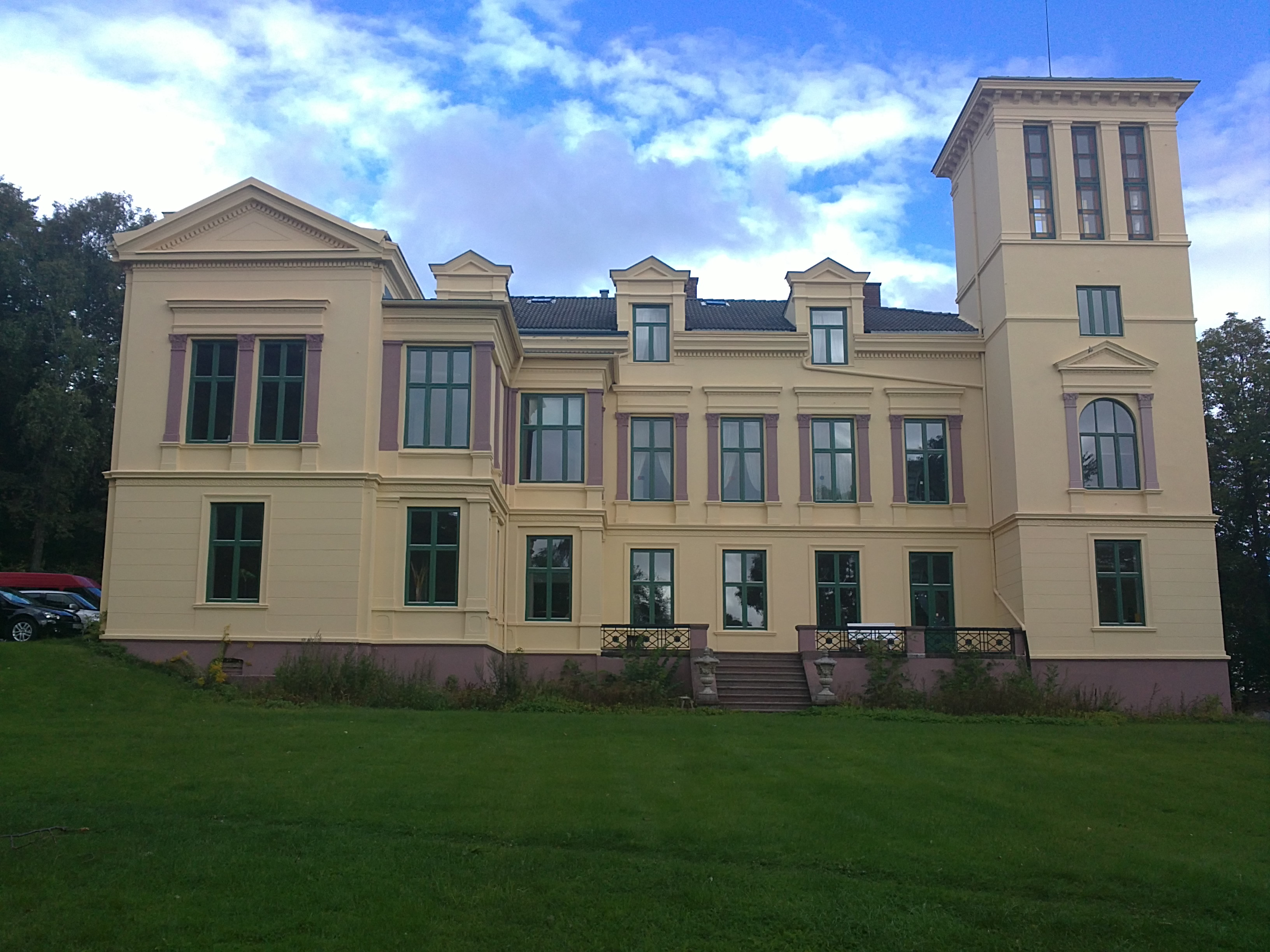
Nedre Nanset, the municipal hall of Hedrum Municipality from 1952 to 1978.

Lardal Municipality was located to the north, Andebu Municipality was located to the east, Sandefjord Municipality and Tjølling Municipality were located to the southeast, Larvik Municipality was located to the south, Brunlanes Municipality was located to the southwest, Porsgrunn Municipality (in Telemark county) was located to the west, and Siljan Municipality (in Telemark county) was located to the northwest.

== Government ==
While it existed, Hedrum Municipality was responsible for primary education (through 10th grade), outpatient health services, senior citizen services, welfare and other social services, zoning, economic development, and municipal roads and utilities. The municipality was governed by a municipal council of directly elected representatives. The mayor was indirectly elected by a vote of the municipal council. The municipality was under the jurisdiction of the Larvik District Court and the Agder Court of Appeal.

=== Municipal council ===
The municipal council (Kommunestyre) of Hedrum Municipality was made up of representatives that were elected to four year terms. The tables below show the historical composition of the council by political party.

Hedrum kommunestyre 1983–1987
| Party name (in Norwegian) | Number of representatives |
|---|---|
| Labour Party (Arbeiderpartiet) | 13 |
| Progress Party (Fremskrittspartiet) | 2 |
| Conservative Party (Høyre) | 11 |
| Christian Democratic Party (Kristelig Folkeparti) | 4 |
| Centre Party (Senterpartiet) | 3 |
| Socialist Left Party (Sosialistisk Venstreparti) | 1 |
| Liberal Party (Venstre) | 1 |
| Total number of members: | 35 |
Note: On 1 January 1988, Hedrum Municipality became part of Larvik Municipality.

Hedrum kommunestyre 1979–1983
| Party name (in Norwegian) | Number of representatives |
|---|---|
| Labour Party (Arbeiderpartiet) | 12 |
| Conservative Party (Høyre) | 11 |
| Christian Democratic Party (Kristelig Folkeparti) | 5 |
| Centre Party (Senterpartiet) | 4 |
| Socialist Left Party (Sosialistisk Venstreparti) | 1 |
| Liberal Party (Venstre) | 2 |
| Total number of members: | 35 |

Hedrum kommunestyre 1975–1979
| Party name (in Norwegian) | Number of representatives |
|---|---|
| Labour Party (Arbeiderpartiet) | 13 |
| Conservative Party (Høyre) | 8 |
| Christian Democratic Party (Kristelig Folkeparti) | 6 |
| New People's Party (Nye Folkepartiet) | 1 |
| Centre Party (Senterpartiet) | 5 |
| Socialist Left Party (Sosialistisk Venstreparti) | 1 |
| Liberal Party (Venstre) | 1 |
| Total number of members: | 35 |

Hedrum kommunestyre 1971–1975
| Party name (in Norwegian) | Number of representatives |
|---|---|
| Labour Party (Arbeiderpartiet) | 13 |
| Conservative Party (Høyre) | 6 |
| Christian Democratic Party (Kristelig Folkeparti) | 5 |
| Centre Party (Senterpartiet) | 6 |
| Liberal Party (Venstre) | 5 |
| Total number of members: | 35 |

Hedrum kommunestyre 1967–1971
| Party name (in Norwegian) | Number of representatives |
|---|---|
| Labour Party (Arbeiderpartiet) | 14 |
| Conservative Party (Høyre) | 6 |
| Christian Democratic Party (Kristelig Folkeparti) | 3 |
| Centre Party (Senterpartiet) | 5 |
| Liberal Party (Venstre) | 7 |
| Total number of members: | 35 |

Hedrum kommunestyre 1963–1967
| Party name (in Norwegian) | Number of representatives |
|---|---|
| Labour Party (Arbeiderpartiet) | 14 |
| Conservative Party (Høyre) | 6 |
| Christian Democratic Party (Kristelig Folkeparti) | 4 |
| Centre Party (Senterpartiet) | 4 |
| Liberal Party (Venstre) | 7 |
| Total number of members: | 35 |

Hedrum herredsstyre 1959–1963
| Party name (in Norwegian) | Number of representatives |
|---|---|
| Labour Party (Arbeiderpartiet) | 14 |
| Conservative Party (Høyre) | 5 |
| Christian Democratic Party (Kristelig Folkeparti) | 4 |
| Centre Party (Senterpartiet) | 5 |
| Liberal Party (Venstre) | 7 |
| Total number of members: | 35 |

Hedrum herredsstyre 1955–1959
| Party name (in Norwegian) | Number of representatives |
|---|---|
| Labour Party (Arbeiderpartiet) | 14 |
| Conservative Party (Høyre) | 5 |
| Christian Democratic Party (Kristelig Folkeparti) | 4 |
| Farmers' Party (Bondepartiet) | 4 |
| Liberal Party (Venstre) | 8 |
| Total number of members: | 35 |

Hedrum herredsstyre 1951–1955
| Party name (in Norwegian) | Number of representatives |
|---|---|
| Labour Party (Arbeiderpartiet) | 11 |
| Conservative Party (Høyre) | 5 |
| Christian Democratic Party (Kristelig Folkeparti) | 4 |
| Farmers' Party (Bondepartiet) | 3 |
| Liberal Party (Venstre) | 9 |
| Total number of members: | 32 |

Hedrum herredsstyre 1947–1951
| Party name (in Norwegian) | Number of representatives |
|---|---|
| Labour Party (Arbeiderpartiet) | 8 |
| Conservative Party (Høyre) | 4 |
| Christian Democratic Party (Kristelig Folkeparti) | 5 |
| Farmers' Party (Bondepartiet) | 4 |
| Joint list of the Liberal Party (Venstre) and the Radical People's Party (Radikale Folkepartiet) | 10 |
| Local List(s) (Lokale lister) | 1 |
| Total number of members: | 32 |

Hedrum herredsstyre 1945–1947
| Party name (in Norwegian) | Number of representatives |
|---|---|
| Labour Party (Arbeiderpartiet) | 10 |
| Conservative Party (Høyre) | 3 |
| Communist Party (Kommunistiske Parti) | 1 |
| Christian Democratic Party (Kristelig Folkeparti) | 5 |
| Farmers' Party (Bondepartiet) | 3 |
| Joint list of the Liberal Party (Venstre) and the Radical People's Party (Radikale Folkepartiet) | 10 |
| Total number of members: | 32 |

Hedrum herredsstyre 1937–1941*
| Party name (in Norwegian) | Number of representatives |
|---|---|
| Labour Party (Arbeiderpartiet) | 11 |
| Conservative Party (Høyre) | 5 |
| Farmers' Party (Bondepartiet) | 5 |
| Liberal Party (Venstre) | 11 |
| Total number of members: | 32 |
Note: Due to the German occupation of Norway during World War II, no elections were held for new municipal councils until after the war ended in 1945.

=== Mayors ===
The mayor (Norwegian: ordfører) of Hedrum Municipality was the political leader of the municipality and the chairperson of the municipal council. The following people have held this position:

- 1838–1847: Knud Peder Kjerulf
- 1848–1851: Hans Fredrik Kjerulf
- 1851–1853: Peder Johansen Berg
- 1860–1861: Knud Peder Kjerulf
- 1862–1867: Hans Christian Nilssen Fosserød
- 1868–1869: Gunnar Thommesen
- 1870–1871: Ole Olsen Eftedal
- 1872–1875: Anders Andersen
- 1876–1887: Gunnar Thommesen
- 1887–1891: Frants Carlsen Rødbøl
- 1892–1895: Nils Olsen Hellenes
- 1896–1897: Ole Evensen Sundby
- 1898–1901: Frants Carlsen Rødbøl
- 1902–1910: Ivar Hagtvedt
- 1911–1913: Karl Johan Hvatum
- 1914–1916: Karl Bergan
- 1917–1919: Thorvald Hvidsteen
- 1920–1922: Anund Iversen Allum
- 1923–1928: Ole Andersen Gåsholt
- 1929–1941: Anund Iversen Allum
- 1941–1941: Ole N. Rimstad
- 1941–1942: Martin Ringdal (NS)
- 1942–1945: Martin Zimmermann (NS)
- 1945–1945: Anund Iversen Allum
- 1946–1963: Mathias Skoli (V)
- 1963–1963: Anders Gåsholt (Sp)
- 1964–1967: Ole Hvidsten (V)
- 1968–1971: Kristoffer Bakkerud (Sp)
- 1972–1975: Harald A. Holm (V)
- 1976–1985: Olav Bergene Holm (KrF)
- 1986–1987: Per Michaelsen (H)

== See also ==
- List of former municipalities of Norway
