= Pålsbufjorden =

Lake in Hol and Nore og Uvdal, Buskerud, Norway

- Location within Norway
- Location: Buskerud County, Norway
- Coordinates: 60°27′N 8°39′E
- Type: Lake
- Surface area: 19.55 km^{2} (7.55 sq mi)
- Surface elevation: 749 m (2,457 ft)

Pålsbufjorden is a lake in the municipalities of Hol and Nore og Uvdal, both in Buskerud County, Norway. The water table lies 749 meters above sea level. The area of the lake is 19.55 square kilometres (7.55 sq mi). The Pålsbu kraftverk hydro-electric plant was built to extract power from the water that draining from Pålsbufjorden down into Tunhovdfjorden. The power plant, which went into operation during 2007, is designed as a turbine from above and is built in concrete. It is located just below Pålsbufjorden dam. Pålsbufjorden and Tunhovdfjorden are both part of the Numedalslågen watershed.

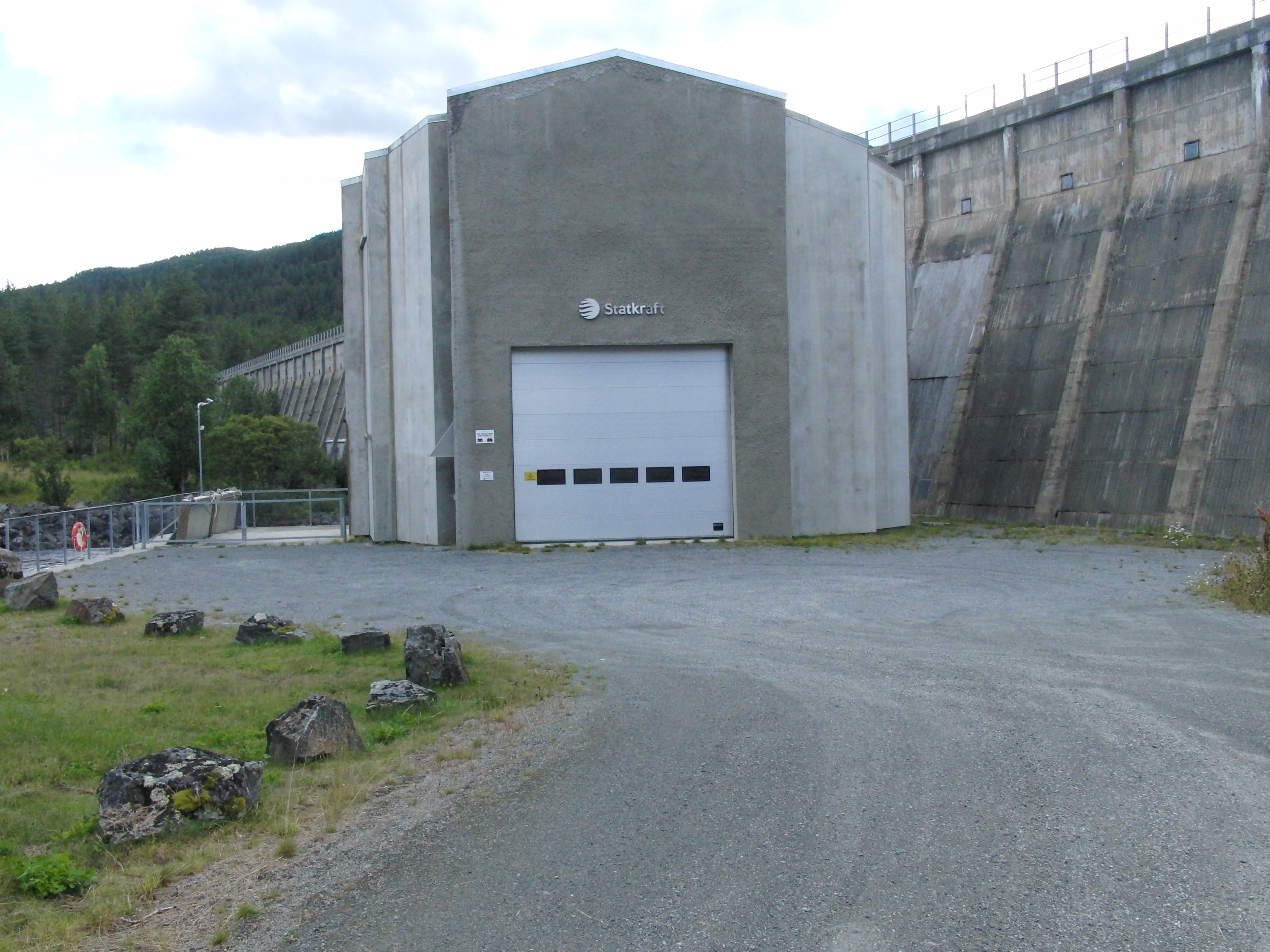
Pålsbu kraftverk designed by Manthey Kula below Pålsbufjorden dam
