= Lågendalen =

Valley in Vestfold, Norway

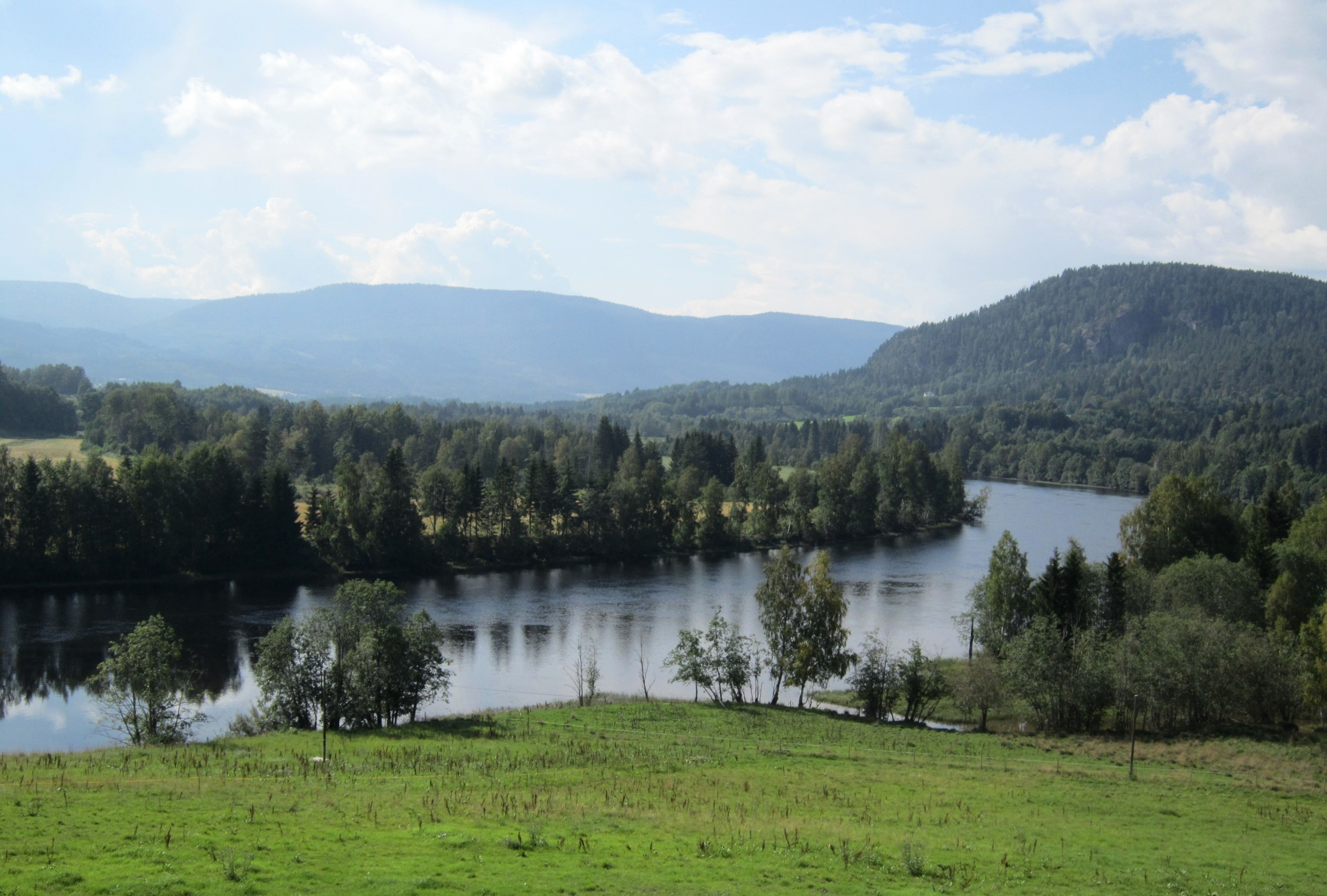
- Lågendalen near Komnes

- Location within Vestfold Location within Buskerud Location within Norway
- Length: 80 kilometres (50 mi) N-S

Geology
- Type: River valley

Geography
- Location: Vestfold and Buskerud, Norway
- Population centers: Larvik, Kongsberg
- Coordinates: 59°25′52″N 9°59′16″E
- Interactive map of Lågendalen

Lågendalen (English: Lågen Valley) is a valley located in eastern Norway.

Lågendalen forms the lower part of the valley through which the river Numedalslågen flows. The valley lies between the town of Kongsberg in Kongsberg Municipality in Buskerud county and the town of Larvik in Larvik Municipality in Vestfold county. North of Kongsberg, the valley is known as Numedal.

The Lågendalen valley is relatively flat, characterized by farmland and wooded hills in both Kongsberg and Larvik municipalities. It includes the villages of Svarstad, Kvelde, Steinsholt, and Skollenberg. Lågendalen is most commonly known for potato cultivation and salmon fishing. Lågendalen is also the location of several Medieval era stone churches: Hedrum Church, Hem Church, Efteløt Church, and Hedenstad Church.

== Gallery ==
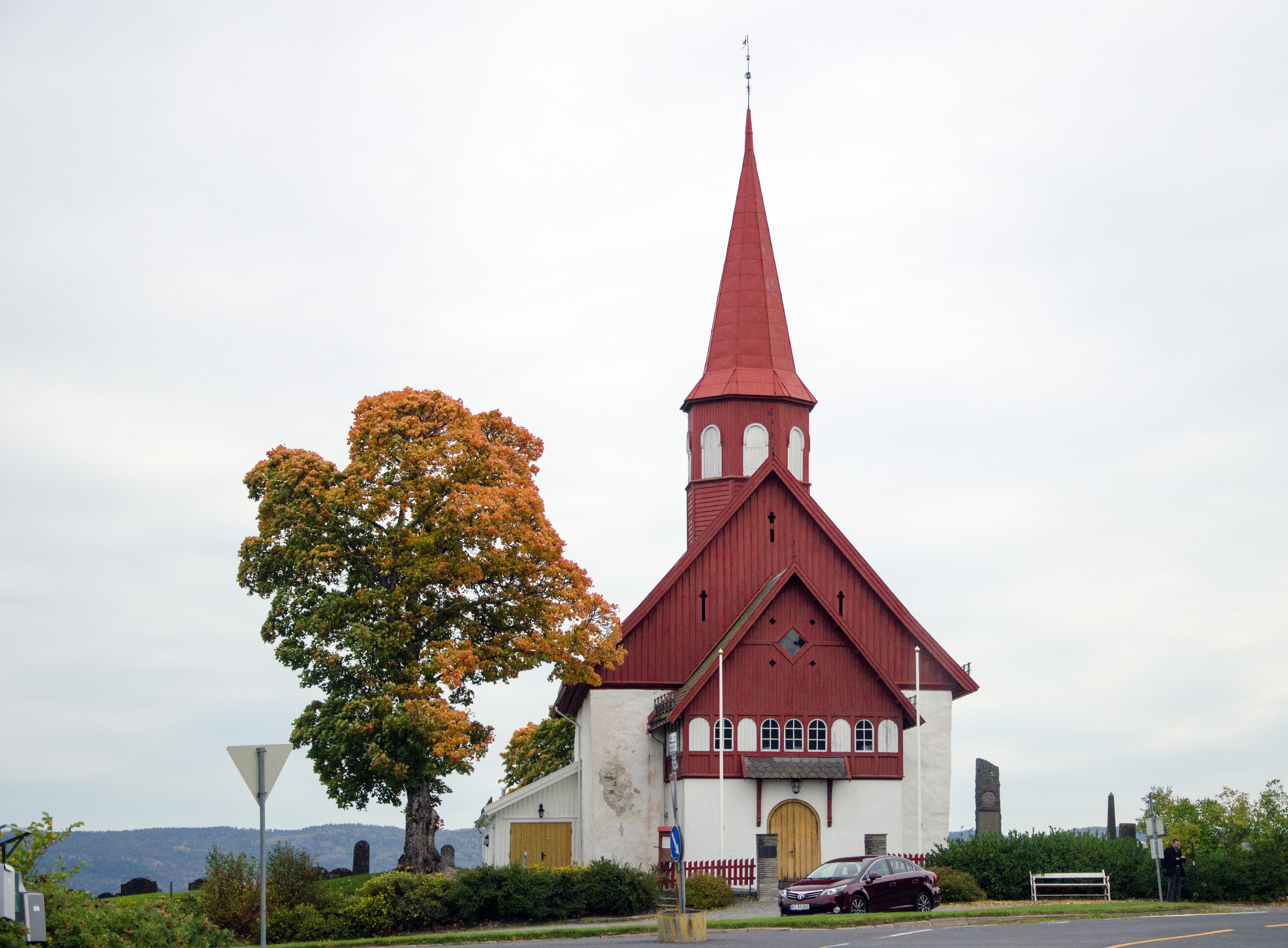
Hedenstad Church

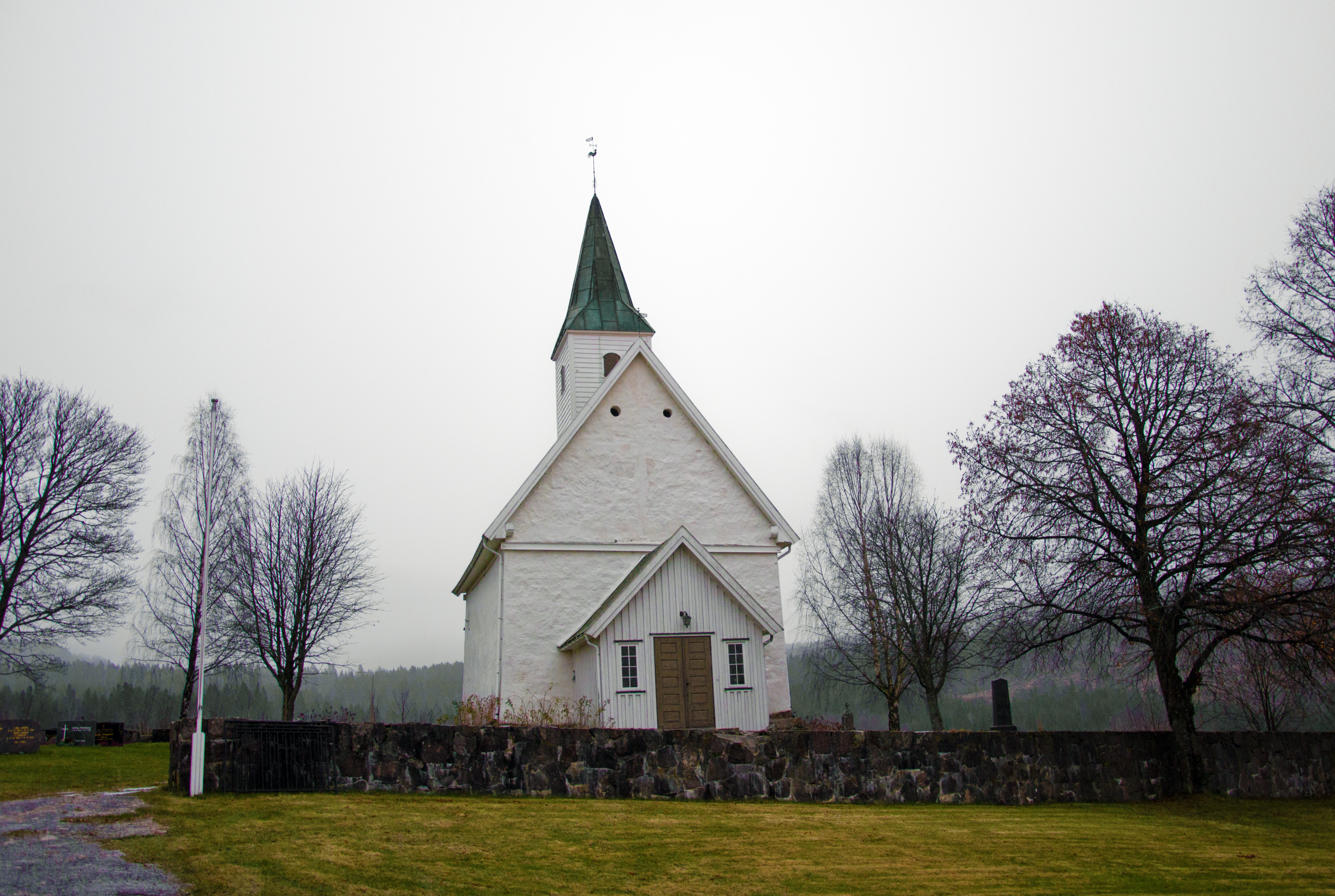
Hem Church

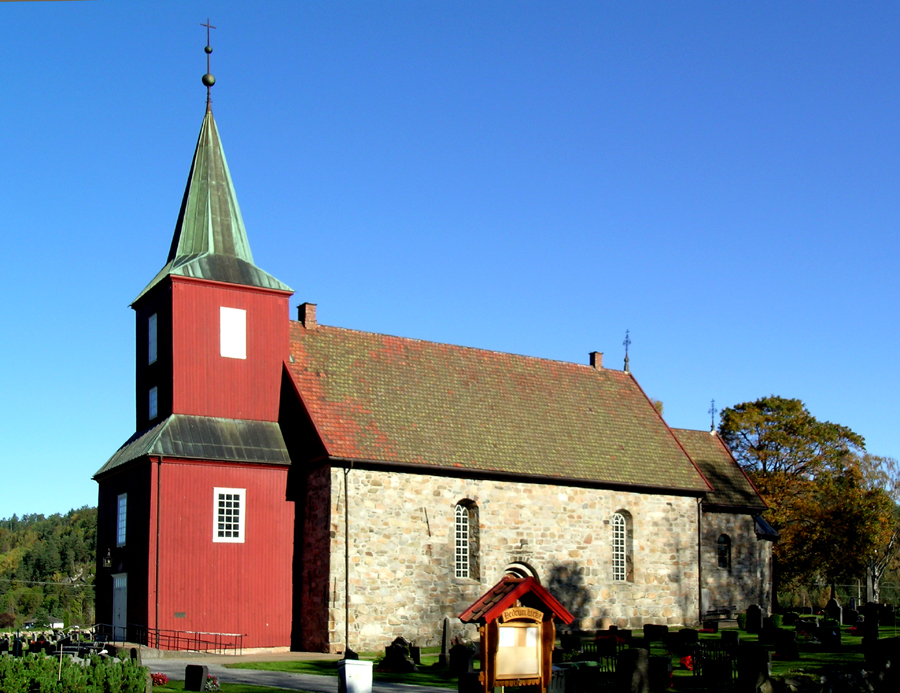
Hedrum Church

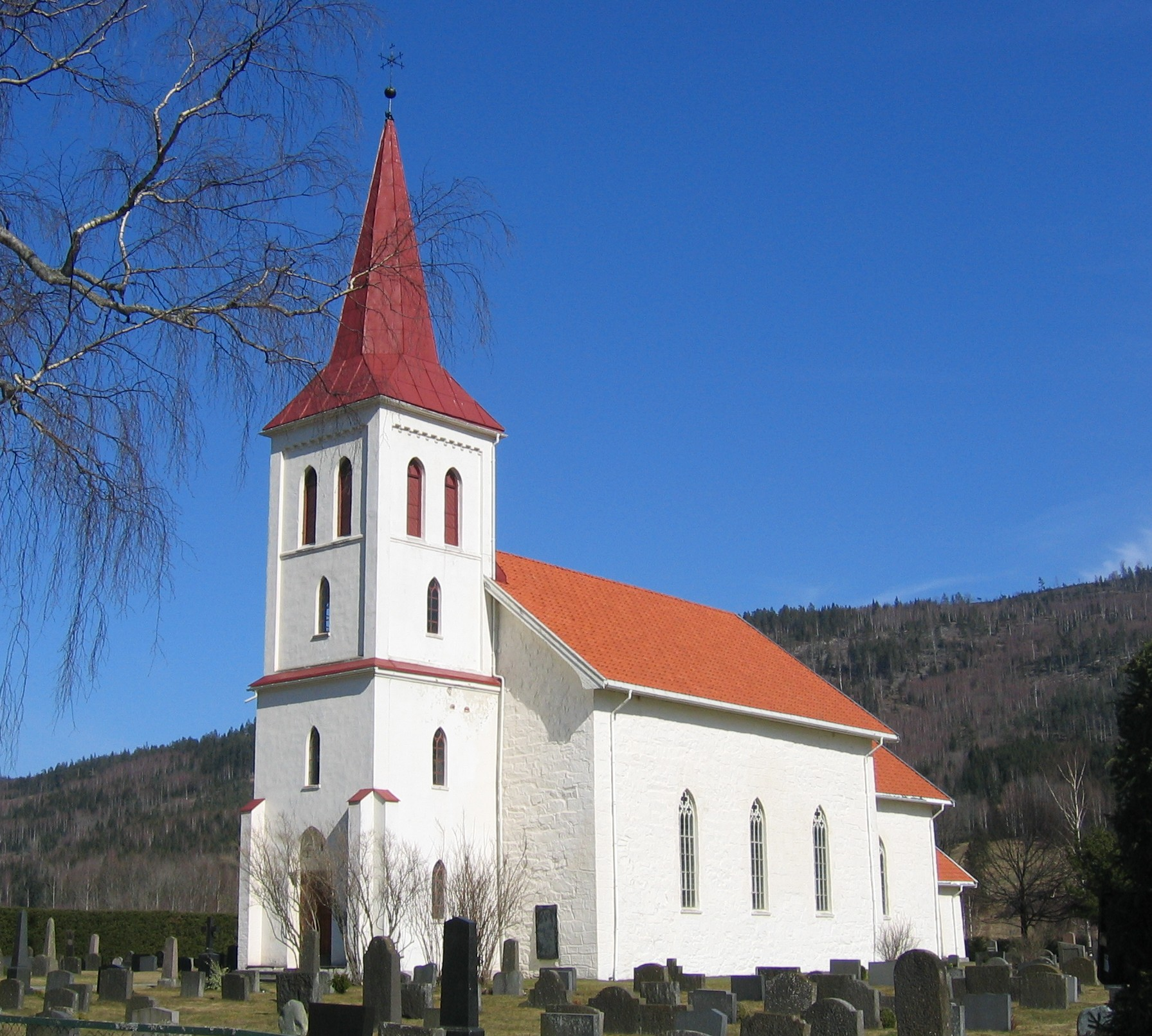
Efteløt Church
