= Hedrum Church =

Church in Vestfold, Norway

- Hedrum kirke
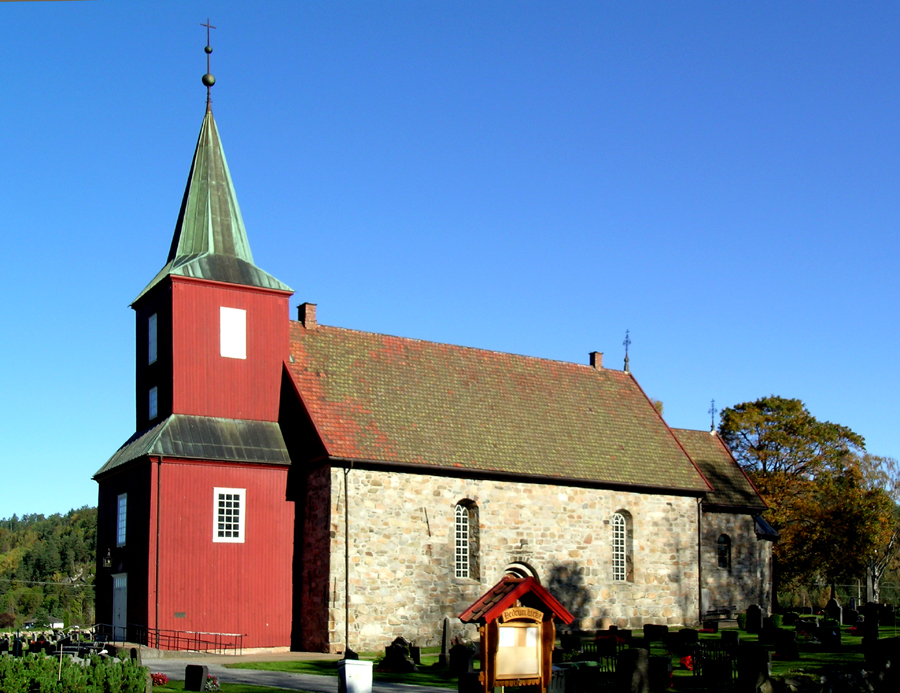
- View of the church
- Hedrum Church
- 59°07′24″N 10°03′37″E
- Location: Larvik Municipality, Vestfold
- Country: Norway
- Denomination: Church of Norway
- Previous denomination: Catholic Church
- Churchmanship: Evangelical Lutheran

History
- Status: Parish church
- Founded: 11th century
- Consecrated: c. 1100

Architecture
- Functional status: Active
- Architectural type: Long church
- Style: Romanesque
- Completed: c. 1100 (926 years ago)

Specifications
- Capacity: 300
- Materials: Stone

Administration
- Diocese: Tunsberg
- Deanery: Larvik prosti
- Parish: Hedrum
- Norwegian Cultural Heritage Site
- Type: Church
- Status: Automatically protected
- ID: 84515

Hedrum Church (Norwegian: Hedrum kirke) is a medieval parish church of the Church of Norway in Larvik Municipality in Vestfold county, Norway. It is located in the village of Hedrum, along the river Numedalslågen. It is the church for the Hedrum parish which is part of the Larvik prosti (deanery) in the Diocese of Tunsberg. The red wood and brown/gray stone church was built in a Romanesque long church design around the year 1100 using plans drawn up by an unknown architect. The church seats about 300 people. As a medieval building, it automatically has protected cultural heritage status.

== History ==
Hedrum Church is named in the Borgarting Christian law code (kristenrett), written around the year 1080. It was one of six "county churches" (fylkeskirke) in the area around the Oslo Fjord. Before the dioceses were created, the clergy of the county churches were appointed by the king. The first church in Hedrum was likely a wooden post church that was built around the year 1060 (a celebration of the 950th anniversary of the church was held in 2010).

During the first half of the 1100s, the wooden church was torn down and a new stone church was built on the same site. The new church was dedicated to the archangel Michael. The church originally was simply constructed with a nave and chancel. Not too long after its construction, an apse was built to the east of the choir. In 1666, the nave was extended by about 4 metres (13 ft) to the west.

In 1814, this church served as an election church (Norwegian: valgkirke). Together with more than 300 other parish churches across Norway, it was a polling station for elections to the 1814 Norwegian Constituent Assembly which wrote the Constitution of Norway. This was Norway's first national elections. Each church parish was a constituency that elected people called "electors" who later met together in each county to elect the representatives for the assembly that was to meet at Eidsvoll Manor later that year.

== Building ==
The church has a rectangular nave, a square chancel, and a semicircular apse. Archaeological studies of the structure indicate that the apse was built later. The arch leading to the apse has the same configuration as the arch to the chancel, suggesting that they may have been created at the same time. All the worked stone is granite. All windows except the east window of the nave were added after the Reformation. The nave's north wall has always been windowless. The south portal of the chancel is particularly elaborate and on the west wing there are two well-known motifs: the beard puller and the tongue puller. In 1859, a large wooden tower was built on the west end of the church building.

The church underwent restoration in the 1920s. A new sacristy was built on the north side of the choir (previously there had been a sacristy at the south portal, but this was torn down). Also, the white plaster on the stone walls was removed, so that the stonework was all exposed.

== Inventory ==
The altarpiece was given to the church by Peder Tøgersen and Hilvig Mickelsdatter in 1664. There are two female figures carved on either side of inner part of the pediment; the one on the left represents Temperance, and the one on the right Wisdom. They are flanked by Saint Peter holding a key and Saint John holding a chalice. The painting in the center shows the Resurrection of Jesus.

There are many gravestones with coats of arms covering large parts of the floor in the church. The church's gravestones are registered with the Genealogy Society of Norway (DIS-Norge, Slekt og Data). There is an Iron Age burial ground near the church.

== Media gallery ==
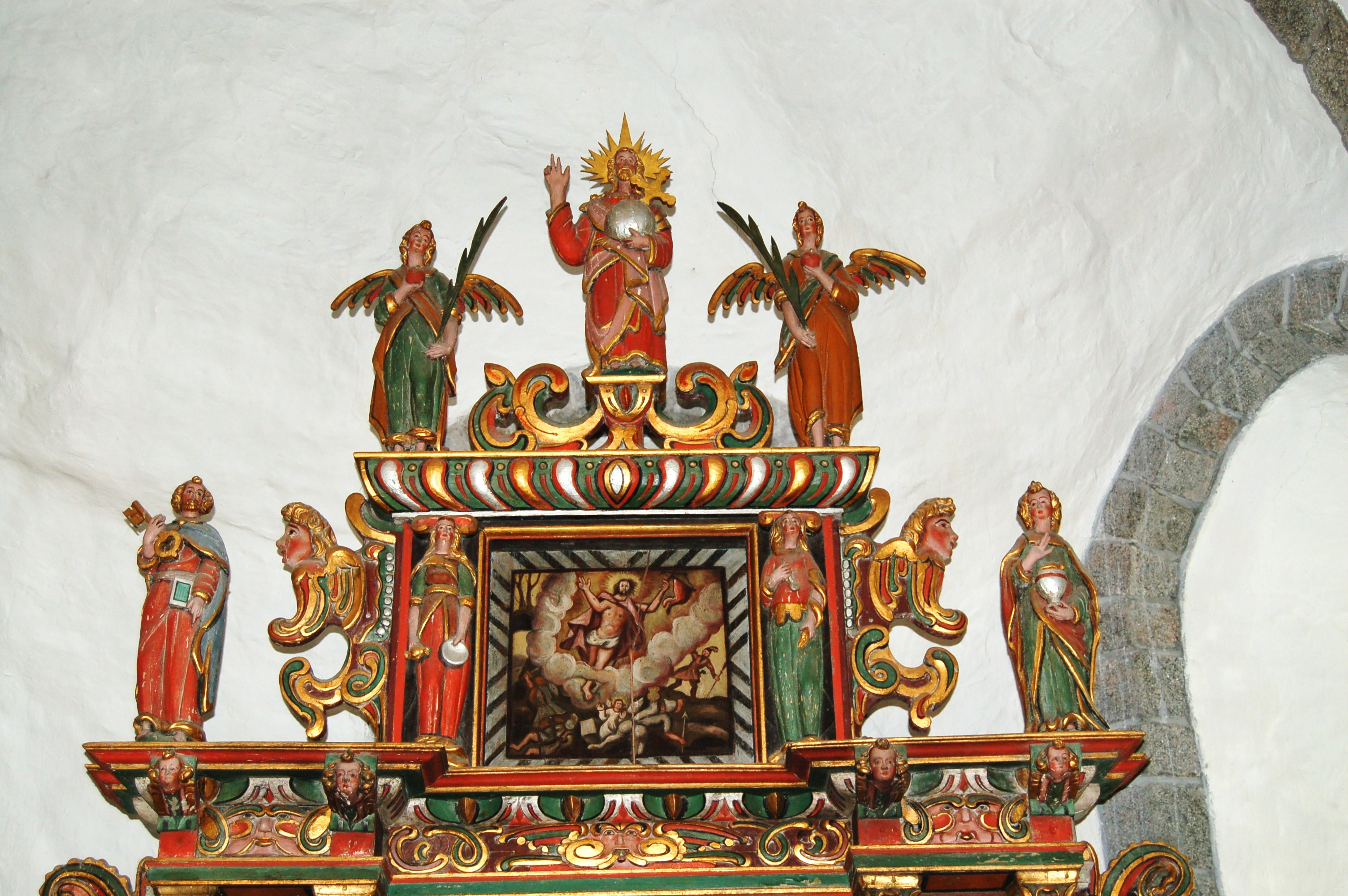
Altar pediment

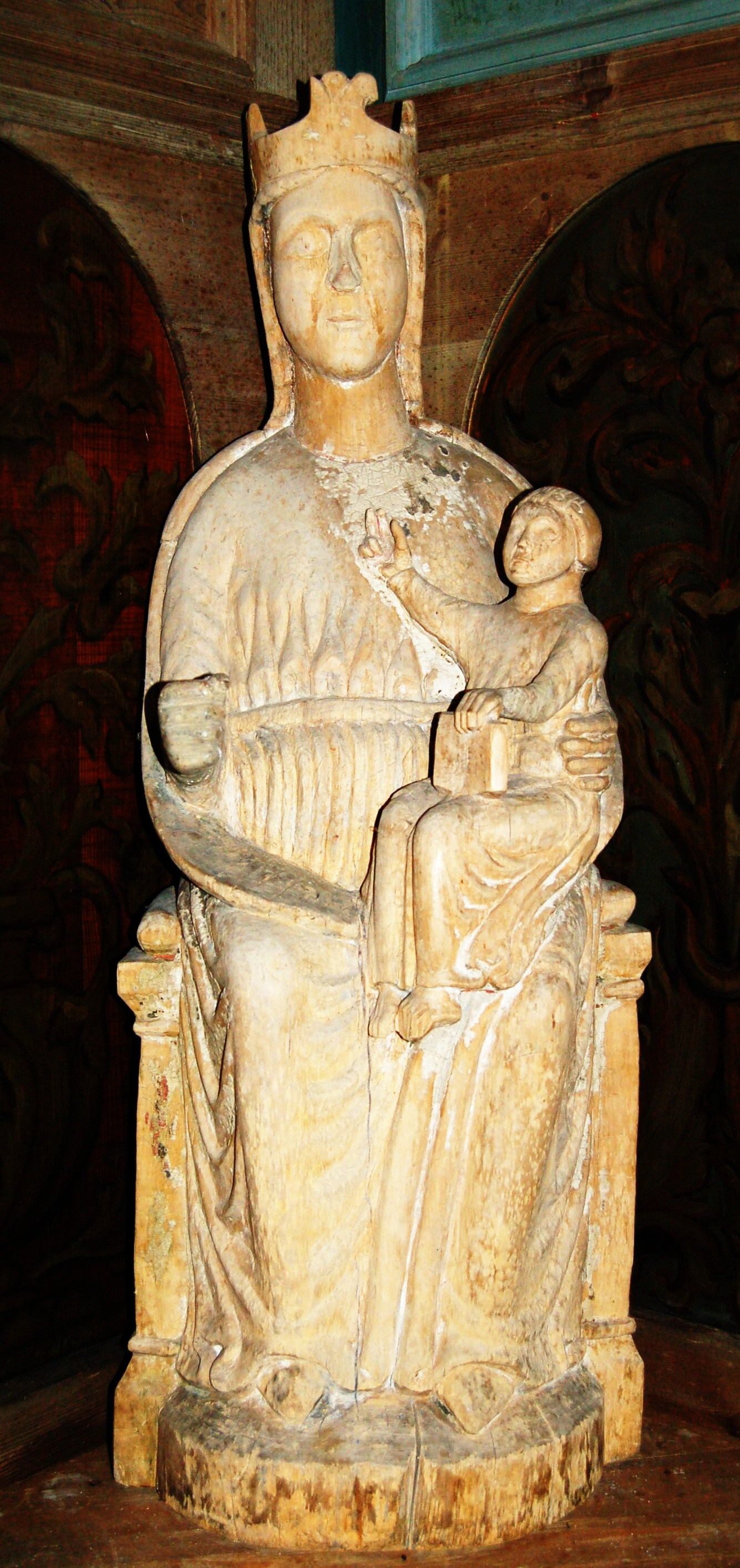
Madonna from c. 1300

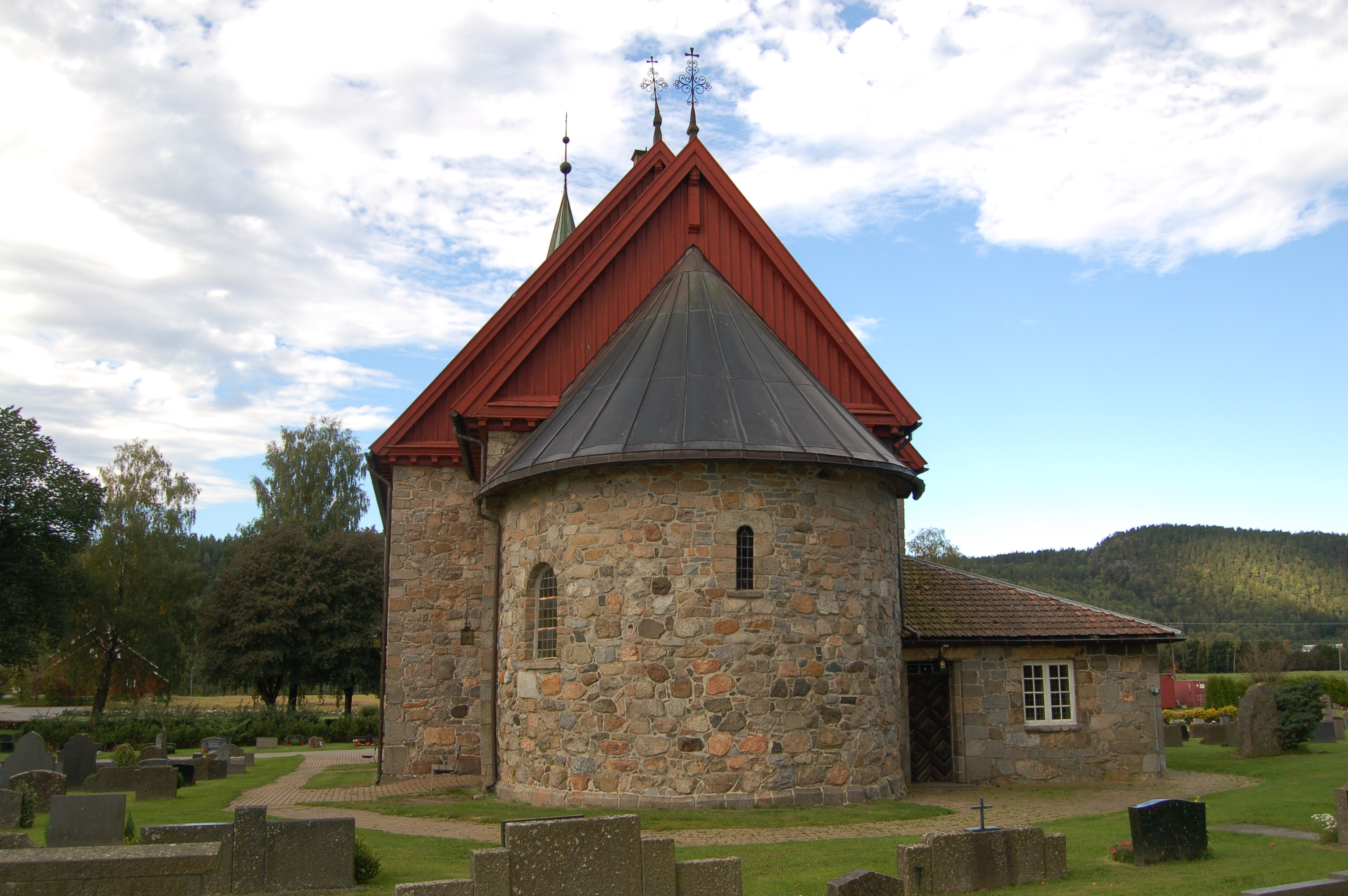
Apse

== See also ==
- List of churches in Tunsberg
