= Kvelde Church =

Church in Vestfold, Norway

- Kvelde kirke
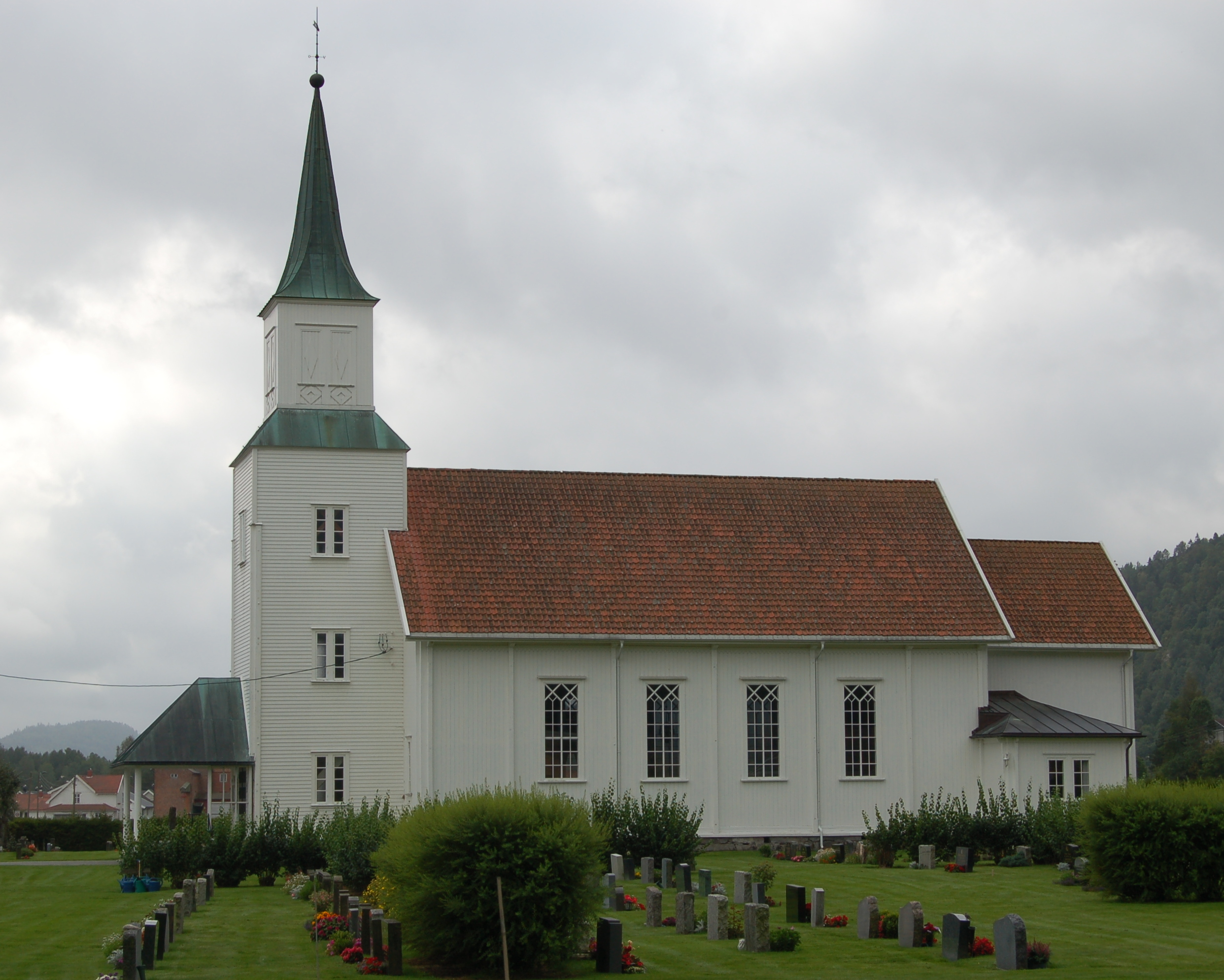
- View of the church
- Kvelde Church
- 59°11′50″N 9°58′04″E
- Location: Larvik Municipality, Vestfold
- Country: Norway
- Denomination: Church of Norway
- Previous denomination: Catholic Church
- Churchmanship: Evangelical Lutheran

History
- Status: Parish church
- Founded: 13th century
- Consecrated: 11 Oct 1871

Architecture
- Functional status: Active
- Architect: J.W. Nordan
- Architectural type: Long church
- Completed: 1871 (155 years ago)

Specifications
- Capacity: 250
- Materials: Wood

Administration
- Diocese: Tunsberg
- Deanery: Larvik prosti
- Parish: Kvelde og Hvarnes
- Norwegian Cultural Heritage Site
- Type: Church
- Status: Not protected
- ID: 84859

Kvelde Church (Norwegian: Kvelde kirke) is a parish church of the Church of Norway in Larvik Municipality in Vestfold county, Norway. It is located in the village of Kvelde. It is one of the churches for the Kvelde og Hvarnes parish which is part of the Larvik prosti (deanery) in the Diocese of Tunsberg. The white, wooden church was built in a long church design in 1871 using plans drawn up by the architect Jacob Wilhelm Nordan. The church seats about 250 people.

== History ==
The earliest existing historical records of the church date back to the year 1398, but the church was not built that year. The first church at Kvelde was a wooden stave church that was located along the shore of the river Numedalslågen, about 260 metres (850 ft) to the north of the present site of the church. That church was likely built during the 13th century, but there is very little known about the building. In 1617, the old church was torn down and replaced with a new building. By the 19th century, the building was too small for the parish and it was no longer structurally sound (likely due to the close proximity of the building to the river banks). It was then decided to build a new church building a short distance away from the river, about 260 metres (850 ft) to the south. The new building was designed by Jacob Wilhelm Nordan and it was built using logs donated by local farmers. The church was consecrated on 11 October 1871. The old church was torn down. The new church was a long church with a nave, chancel, and a small sacristy on the south side of the chancel. In 1930, a new sacristy was built on the north side of the chancel.

The church was its own parish until 1 January 2024 when the parishes of Kvelde and Hvarnes were merged into Kvelde og Hvarnes parish.

== See also ==
- List of churches in Tunsberg
