= Hvarnes Church =

Church in Vestfold, Norway

- Hvarnes kirke
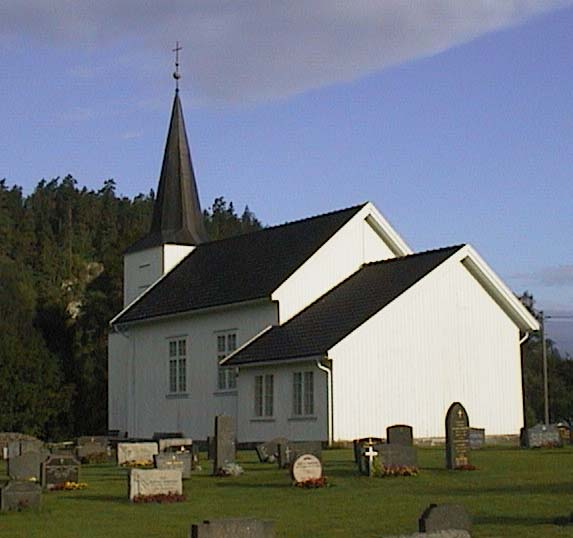
- View of the church
- Hvarnes Church
- 59°15′51″N 9°56′18″E
- Location: Larvik Municipality, Vestfold
- Country: Norway
- Denomination: Church of Norway
- Previous denomination: Catholic Church
- Churchmanship: Evangelical Lutheran

History
- Status: Parish church
- Founded: c. 1200

Architecture
- Functional status: Active
- Architectural type: Long church
- Completed: 1705 (321 years ago)

Specifications
- Capacity: 200
- Materials: Wood

Administration
- Diocese: Tunsberg
- Deanery: Larvik prosti
- Parish: Kvelde og Hvarnes
- Norwegian Cultural Heritage Site
- Type: Church
- Status: Automatically protected
- ID: 84681

Hvarnes Church (Norwegian: Hvarnes kirke) is a parish church of the Church of Norway in Larvik Municipality in Vestfold county, Norway. It is located in the village of Hvarnes, on the shore of the Numedalslågen river. It is one of the churches for the Kvelde og Hvarnes parish which is part of the Larvik prosti (deanery) in the Diocese of Tunsberg. The white, wooden church was built in a long church design in 1705 using plans drawn up by an unknown architect. The church seats about 200 people.

== History ==
The earliest existing historical records of the church date back to the year 1398, but the church was not built that year. The first church at Hvarnes was a wooden stave church that was likely built around the year 1200. In 1398, the stave church was dedicated to St. Olav. By the late 1600s, the church was said to be showing signs of rot and decay. In 1671, the church building was purchased by the Countship of Larvik, but the building was not improved. Around 1700, it was decided to tear down the old church and rebuild it on the same site. The new church was completed in 1705. The new long church was built of log construction and it has a rectangular nave and a rectangular chancel. In 1708, the church received exterior paneled siding. It also got more beams and iron bolts to improve its structural integrity. It is uncertain if the wooden tower was part of the original construction, but by 1713, there was a wooden tower at the main entrance on the west end of the nave. In 1849, a small sacristy on the south side of the chancel was built (and it was enlarged in 1896). The church was painted maroon on the outside until 1872, but was then painted white. At the same time, the interior was repainted. Then there were further interior changes in 1928–29 before a major restoration in 1977 which saw the interior colors changed back to the original. Inside, the church has a second floor seating gallery along the west wall and north wall of the nave. The chancel opening is round-arched, and the chancel and nave both have a flat ceiling, with the chancel ceiling being significantly lower than that of the nave.

The church was its own parish until 1 January 2024 when the parishes of Kvelde and Hvarnes were merged into Kvelde og Hvarnes parish.

== Media gallery ==
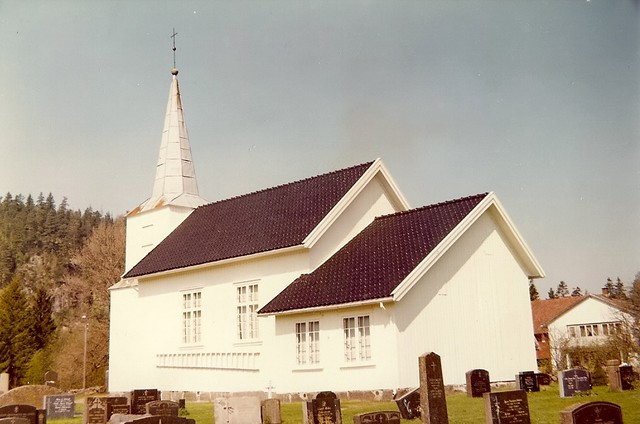

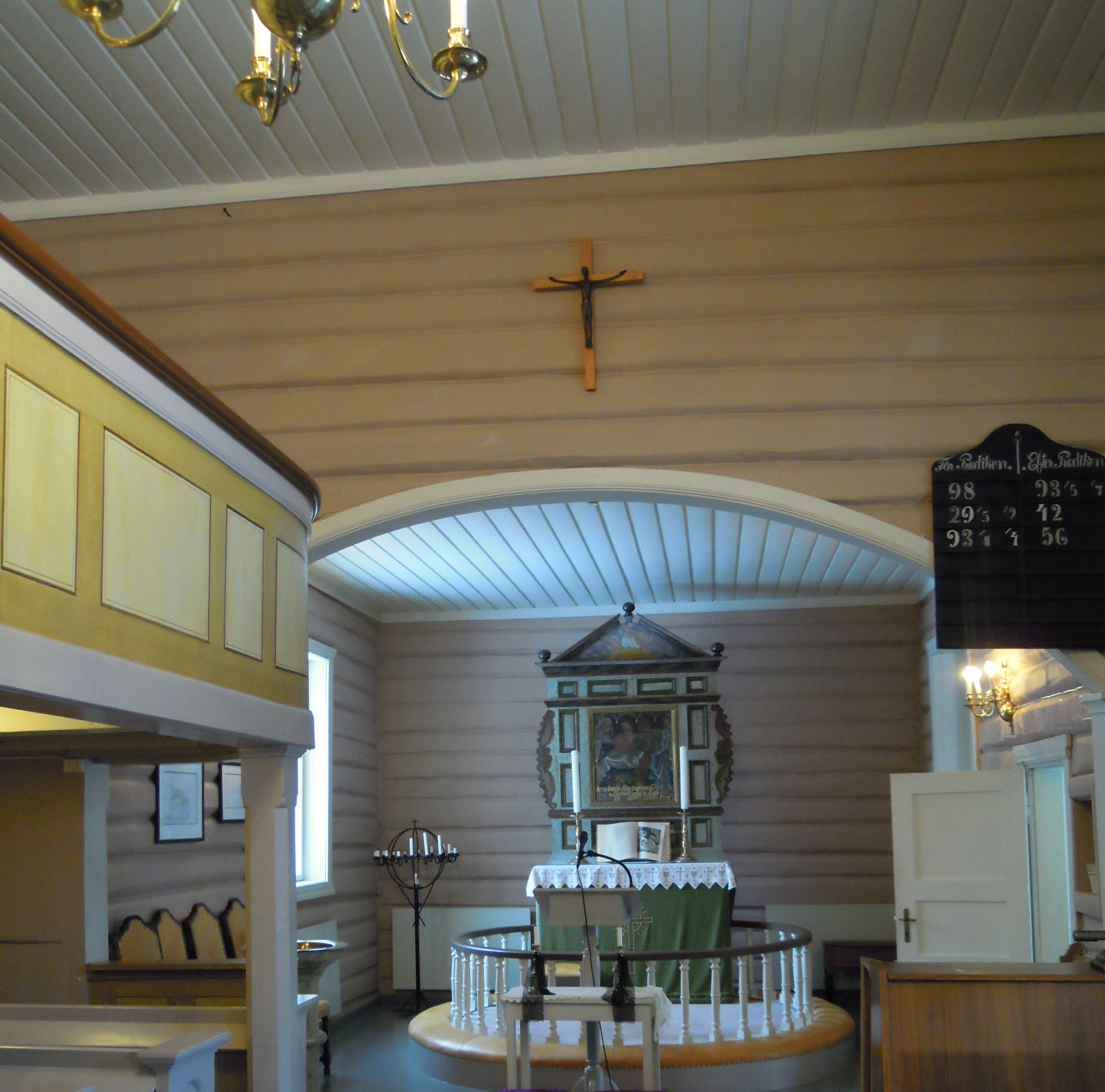

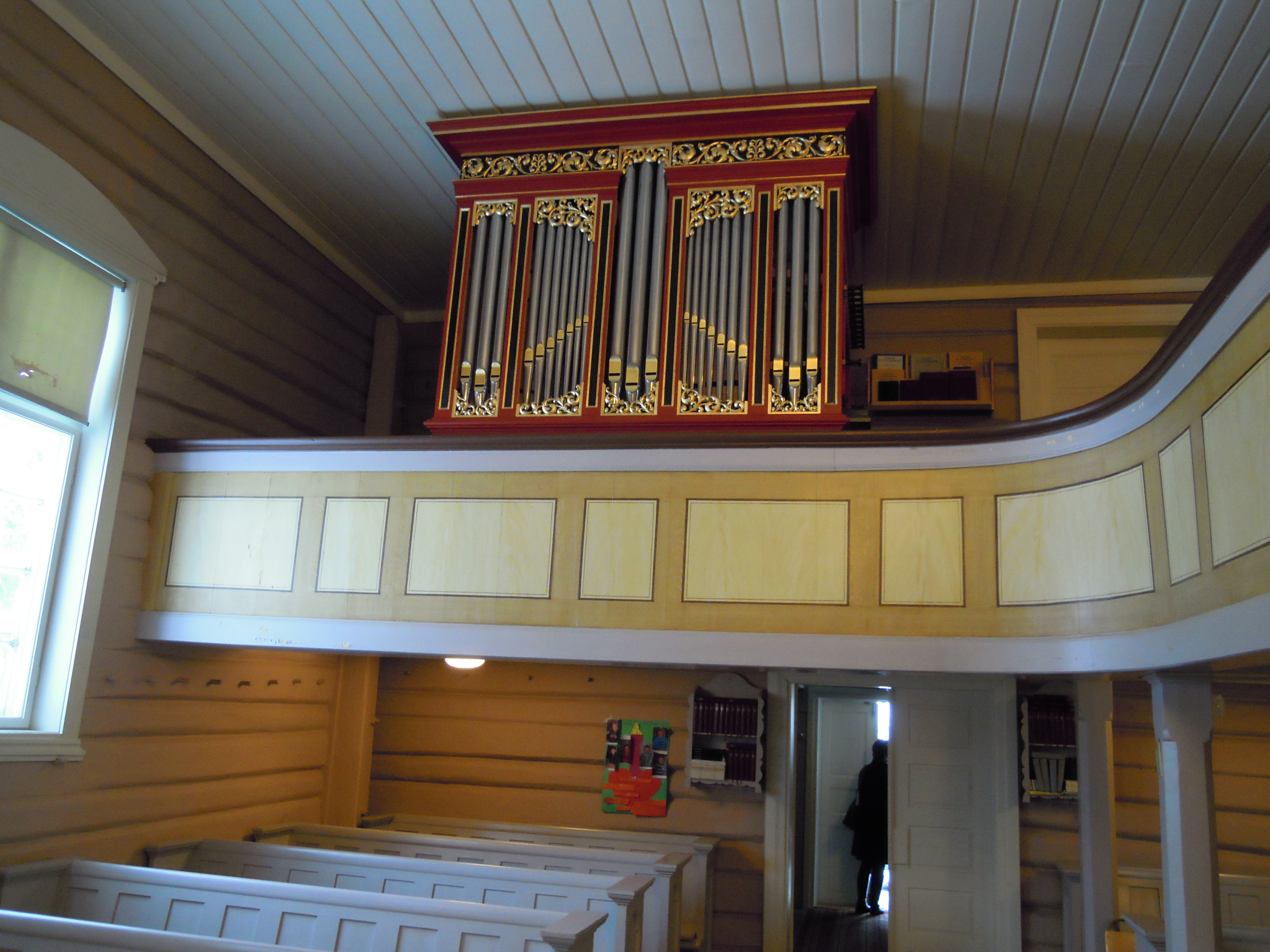

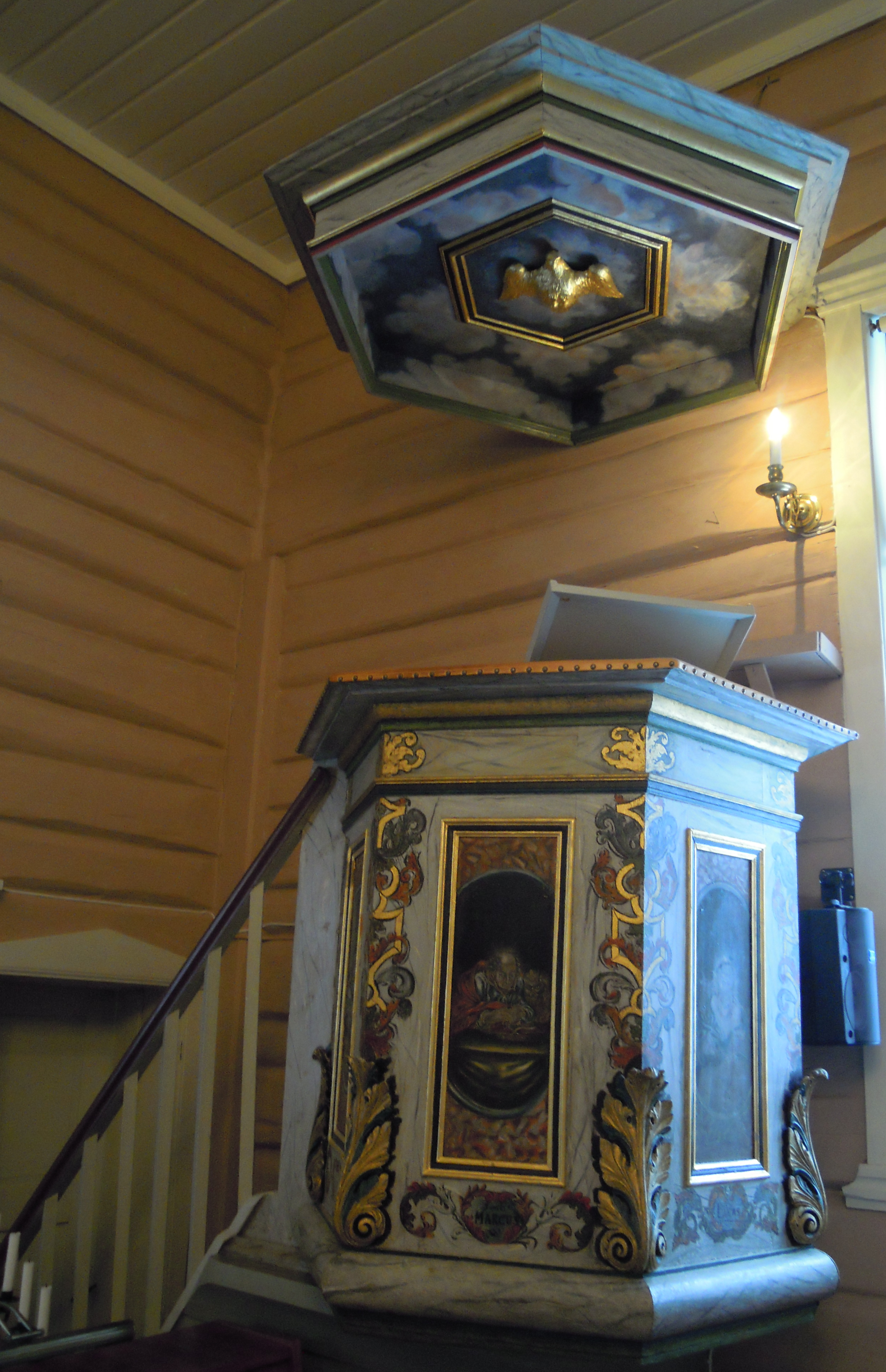

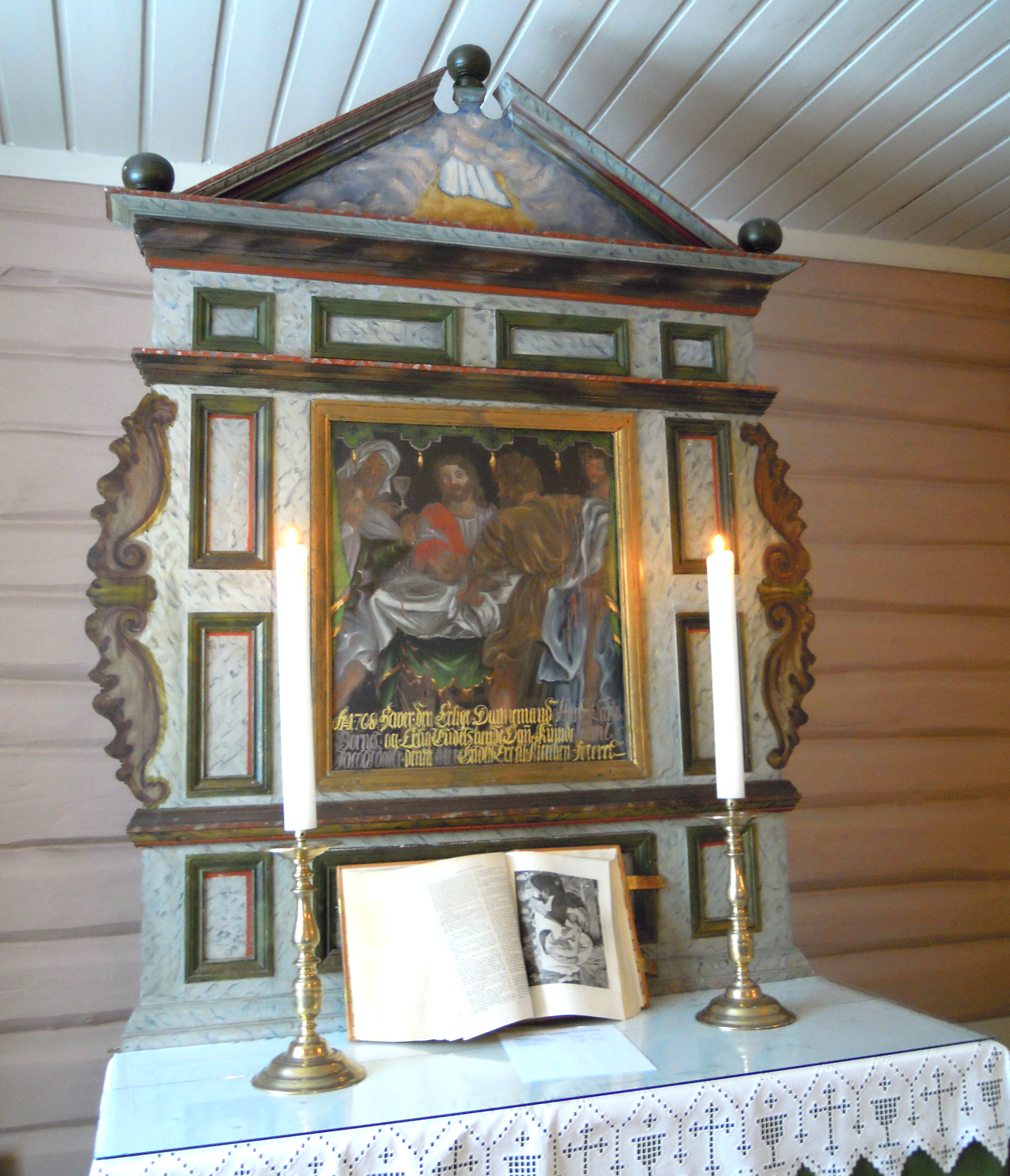

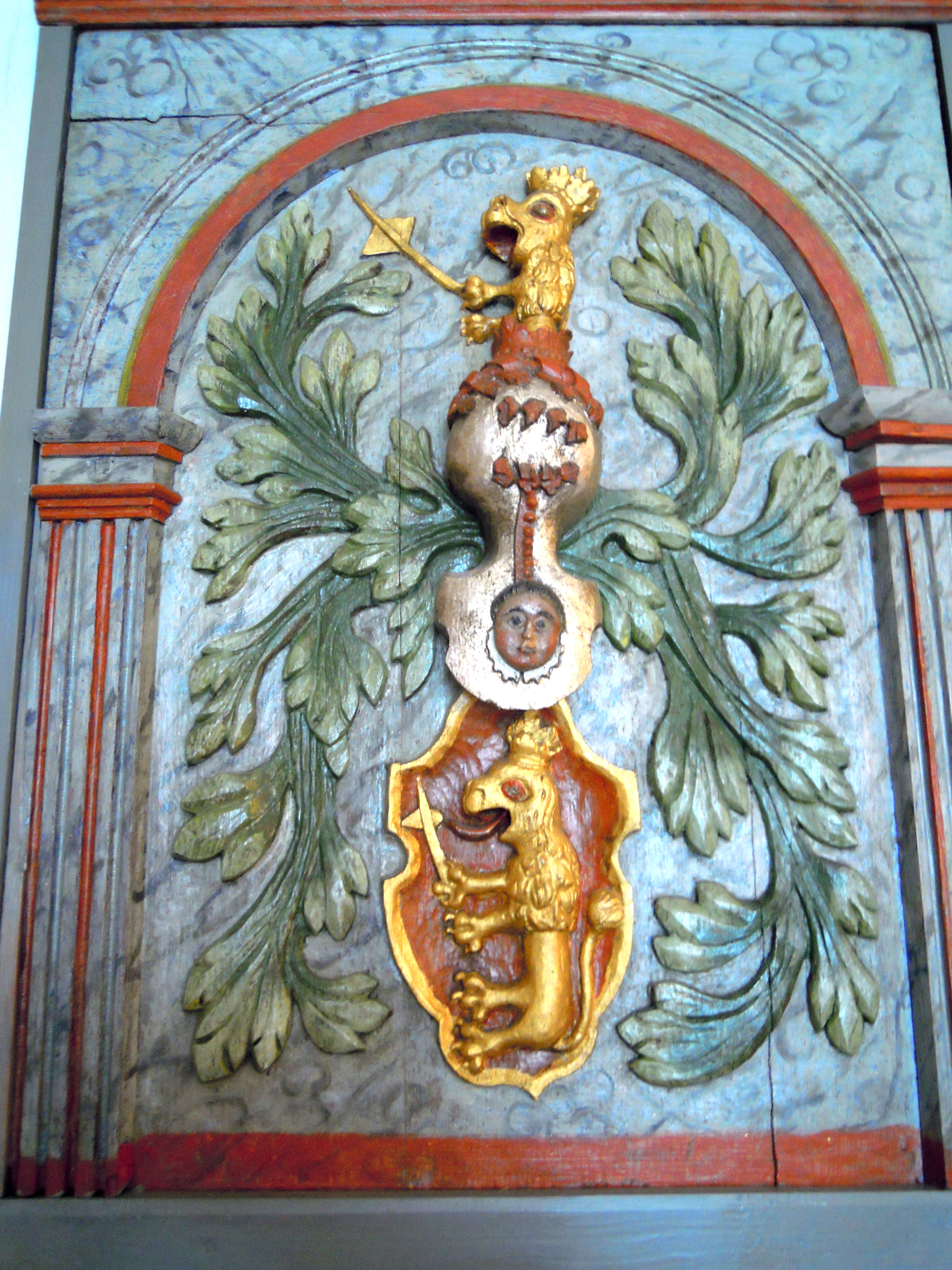

== See also ==
- List of churches in Tunsberg
