= Kvelde =

Village in Larvik, Norway

- Village
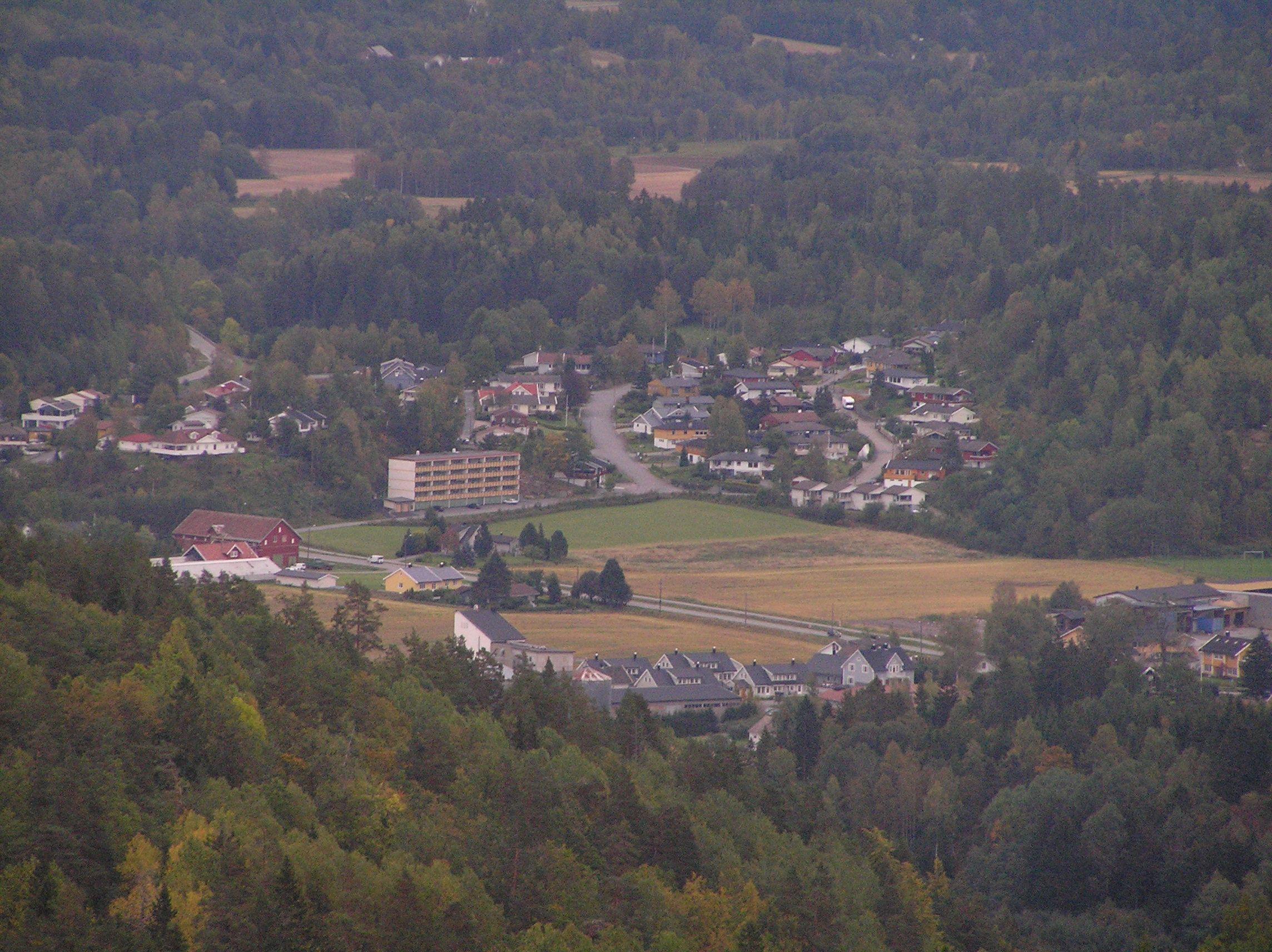
- View of the village
- Interactive map of Kvelde
- Coordinates: 59.19241°N 9.96886°E
- Country: Norway
- Region: Eastern Norway
- County: Vestfold
- District: Vestfold
- Municipality: Larvik Municipality

Area
  - Total: 0.75 km^{2} (0.29 sq mi)
- Elevation: 31 m (102 ft)

Population (2026)
  - Total: 1,081
  - Density: 1,441/km^{2} (3,730/sq mi)
- Time zone: UTC+01:00 (CET)
  - Summer (DST): UTC+02:00 (CEST)
- Post Code: 3282 Kvelde

Kvelde is a village in Larvik Municipality in Vestfold county, Norway. The village is located along the banks of the river Numedalslågen. The town of Larvik is located about 16 kilometres (9.9 mi) to the south, the village of Gjone lies about 3 kilometres (1.9 mi) to the south, and the large lake Farris lies about 5 kilometres (3.1 mi) to the southwest.

The 0.75-square-kilometre (190-acre) village has a population (2026) of 1,081 and a population density of 1,441 inhabitants per square kilometre (3,730/sq mi).

The name stems from a local word meaning "turn of the river". The local Kvelde Church dates from 1871. The nearby Musekollen is the highest point in the area, just north of the village.
