= Genealogy Society of Norway =

Organization

- Formation: 1990
- Type: Voluntary association
- Headquarters: Oslo
- Location: Norway
- Members: 12,690
- Website: https://slektogdata.no/

The Genealogy Society of Norway (Norwegian: Slekt og Data, formerly DIS-Norge and DIS-Norge, Slekt og Data) was established on January 12, 1990 and is Norway's largest genealogical organisation.

The organisation's purpose is to create online and local meetings for anyone interested in genealogy and personal history, to spread knowledge about the topic, and to encourage genealogy in Norway. The society stimulates professional development, conservation, documentation, and dissemination of genealogical and personal stories, and it strives to develop digital platforms for the exchange of knowledge and methods. Knowledge of genealogical and personal stories and their preservation is an important part of protecting intangible cultural heritage. The society's former acronym DIS stands for Data i slektsforskning 'data in genealogy'.

Heidi Ringsrød was elected the director of the society at its congress in 2020 and 2024.

The organization has over 11,000 members and is a member of the Norwegian Federation of Cultural Heritage Organisations (Norges kulturvernforbund), the Association of NGOs in Norway (Frivillighet Norge), and the Study Association for Culture and Tradition (Studieforbundet kultur og tradisjon).

== History ==
The Swedish Genealogy Society (Föreningen DIS) was established on April 1, 1980 and was the inspiration for establishing the Genealogy Society of Norway on January 12, 1990. From early on, computing and data communication were important in the association's work. Now work with genealogy has generally taken over, and the data aspect is most important for developing tools.

=== Former directors ===
The director of the society is elected at its congress for a two-year term. Former directors include Wilhelm Færden (1990–1993), Sjur Madsen (1994–1995), Bjørn Nilsen (1996–1997), Jan Solberg (1998–1999), Jan Eri (2000–2003), Finn Karlsen (2004–2005), Torill Johnsen (2006–2013), Torill Moseid (2014–2018), Morten Thorvaldsen (2018–2020) and Heidi Ringsrød (since 2020).

== Governing board ==
The society's governing board consists of the director, deputy director and seven board members. The general secretary takes part in board meetings. At the 2024 congress, the composition of the governing board was: Heidi Ringsrød (director), Bente Nordhagen (deputy director), Per-Ove Uthaug (board member), Sissel Marit Bue (board member), Jonny Lyngstad (board member), Viggo Eide (board member), Erik Nilsen (board member), Bjarne Husevåg (board member), Kari Stumberg Omholt (board member).

== Local branches ==
Each of Norway's counties has a local branch of the society. The society is organized into 18 local branches with their own elected directors, and the local groups are directly affiliated with the local branches. The first local branch established was the Hordaland branch in 1991. The local branches and the local groups are responsible for the society's activities and continuing operation. All activities are carried out on a voluntary basis by over 300 representatives. Every year, the society holds over 1000 meetings, evening discussions, and courses across Norway.

== Internet services ==
The society operates several internet services for genealogists: Slektsforum (Genealogy forum), Gravminner (Gravestones in Norway) and Kildeveiviseren (Guide to Historical and Genealogical Sources in Norway).

The society's volunteers have carried out extensive work testing genealogy software. Currently, programs are being tested to ensure quality import and export of GEDCOM files.

== The Magazine Slekt og Data ==
The society is publishing a magazine/journal (in norwegian).The magazine provides members with genealogical knowledge, both historical and methodological, with particular emphasis on referring to relevant sources to help them find their roots.

== Genealogy Webinars ==
Genealogy Society of Norway offers webinars, on relevant genealogical topics like "Beginner's course in genealogy", "Artificial intelligence in genealogy", "How to search the National Library" or "Which genealogy program should you choose".

== Newsletter ==
The society publishes a newsletter (in norwegian) for its members called Slekt og Data (Genealogy and Data) eight times a year.

== Source indexing ==
In 2001, the society and the National Archives of Norway signed an agreement on source indexing for parish registers. The agreement gives the society's indexing group free access to parish registers for indexing, but the National Archives has the exclusive right to publish the material on the internet at the national level (via the Digital Archives). Many of the indexed parish records that are available at Digital Archives were indexed and checked by the society's members.

In parallel with indexing parish registers, research has also started on indexing cemeteries. This is a large-scale volunteer effort that will provide easier access to these sources.

== Gravminner: Gravestone project ==
The society's gravestone project, (Gravminner) is one of its most significant contributions to safeguarding perishable cultural heritage. It consists of a database with over 3.5 million indexed gravestones and is searched around 4 million times every year. The intention is to photograph and index all gravestones in Norwegian churches and cemeteries.

The purpose of the burial site index is to make it easier for genealogists to determine where particular individuals are buried, and to find birth and death dates for deceased relatives (e.g., single and childless persons) when oral sources or more recent church records are unavailable.

Gravminner is an important historical source because the gravestones that are photographed and indexed in the database will always be available, even after the stones are physically removed from the cemetery—thus allowing people to find ancestral graves online even after they no longer physically exist. The society's members are actively cooperating with many church vergers in Norway. The vergers' local databases serve as a basis for photography and further indexing, and the database is constantly growing thanks to volunteer efforts, helping create the most complete and accurate database of burials in Norway.
