= Manthey Kula =

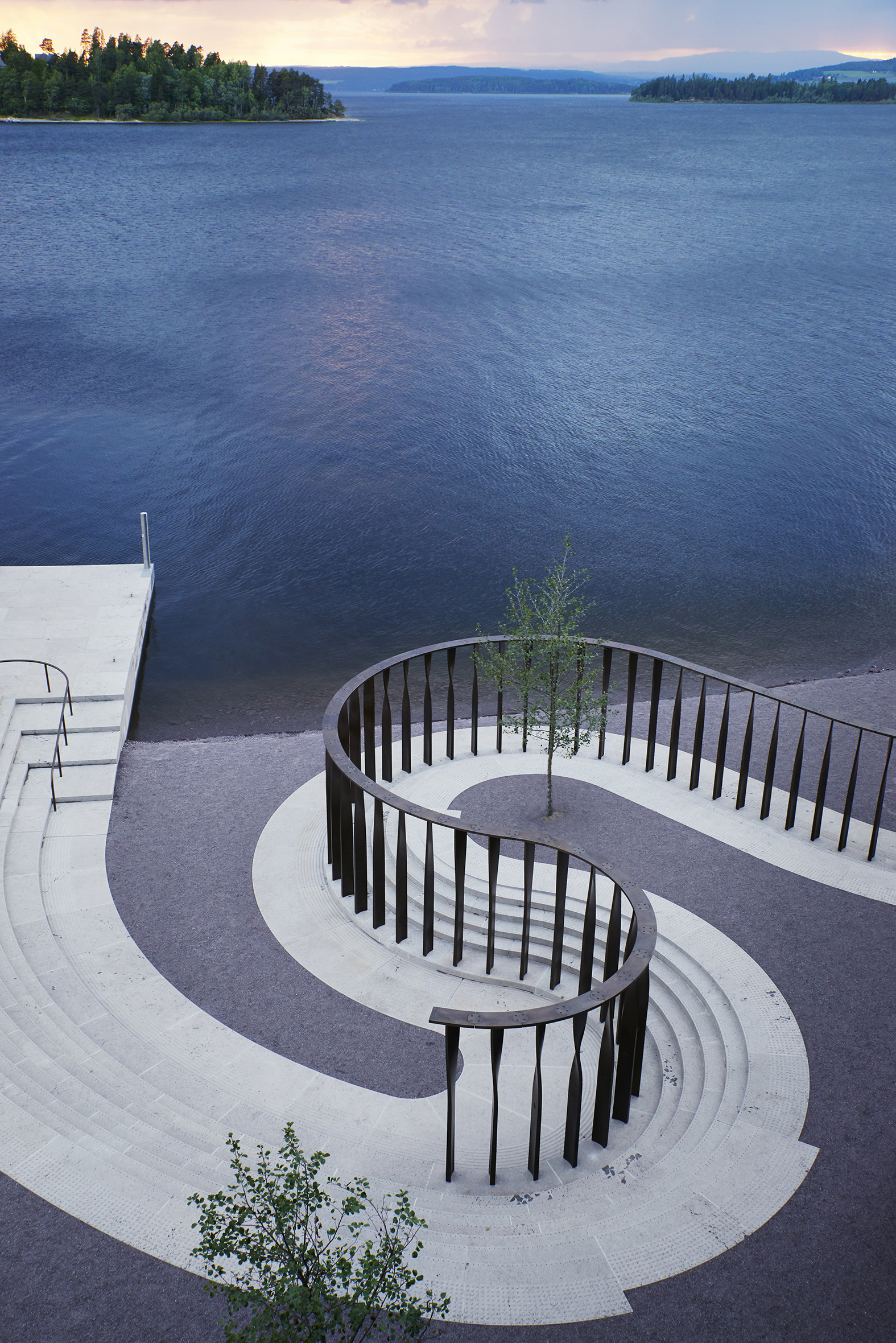
National Memorial at Utøyakaia Photo Sébastien Corbari

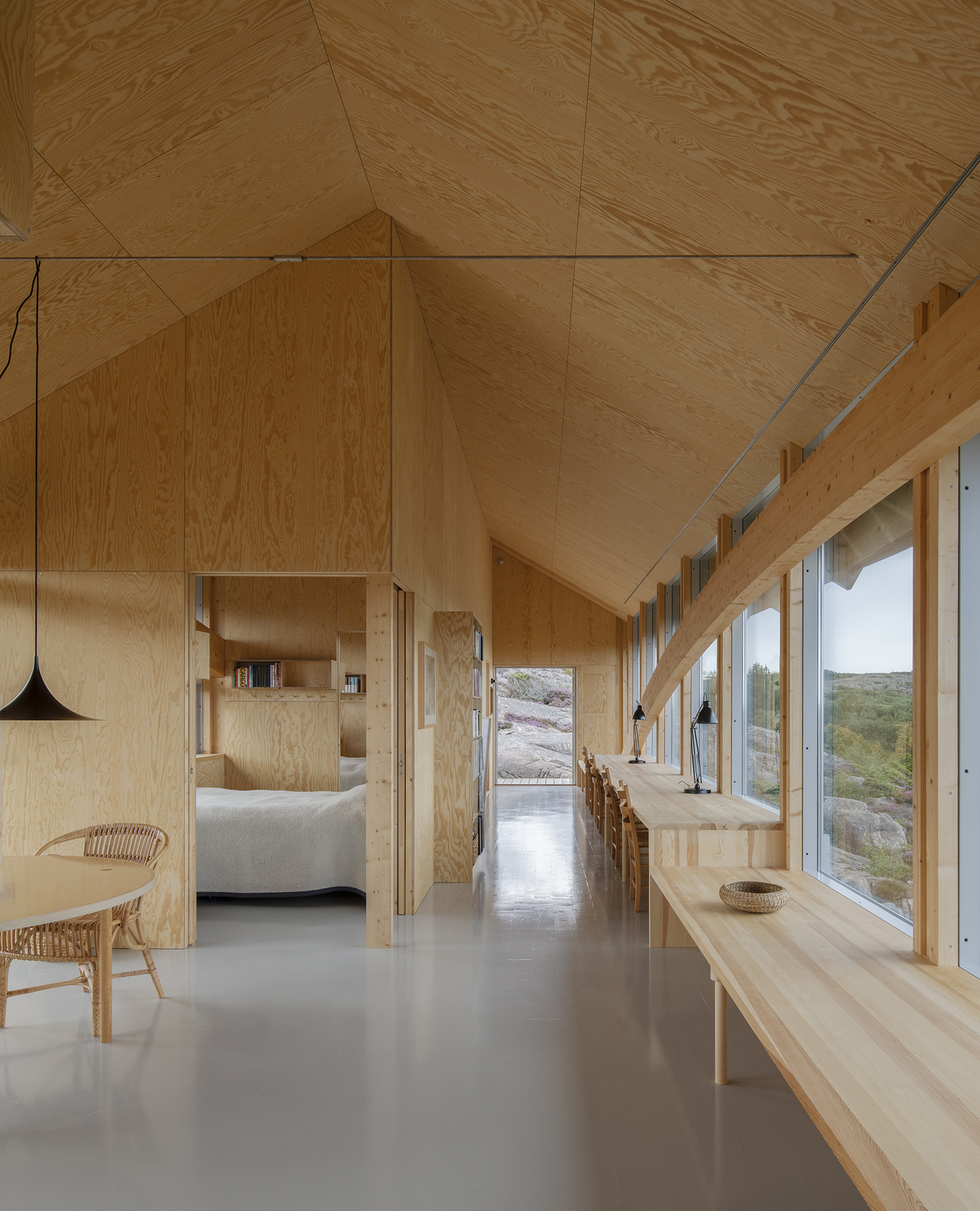
House Hamburgö

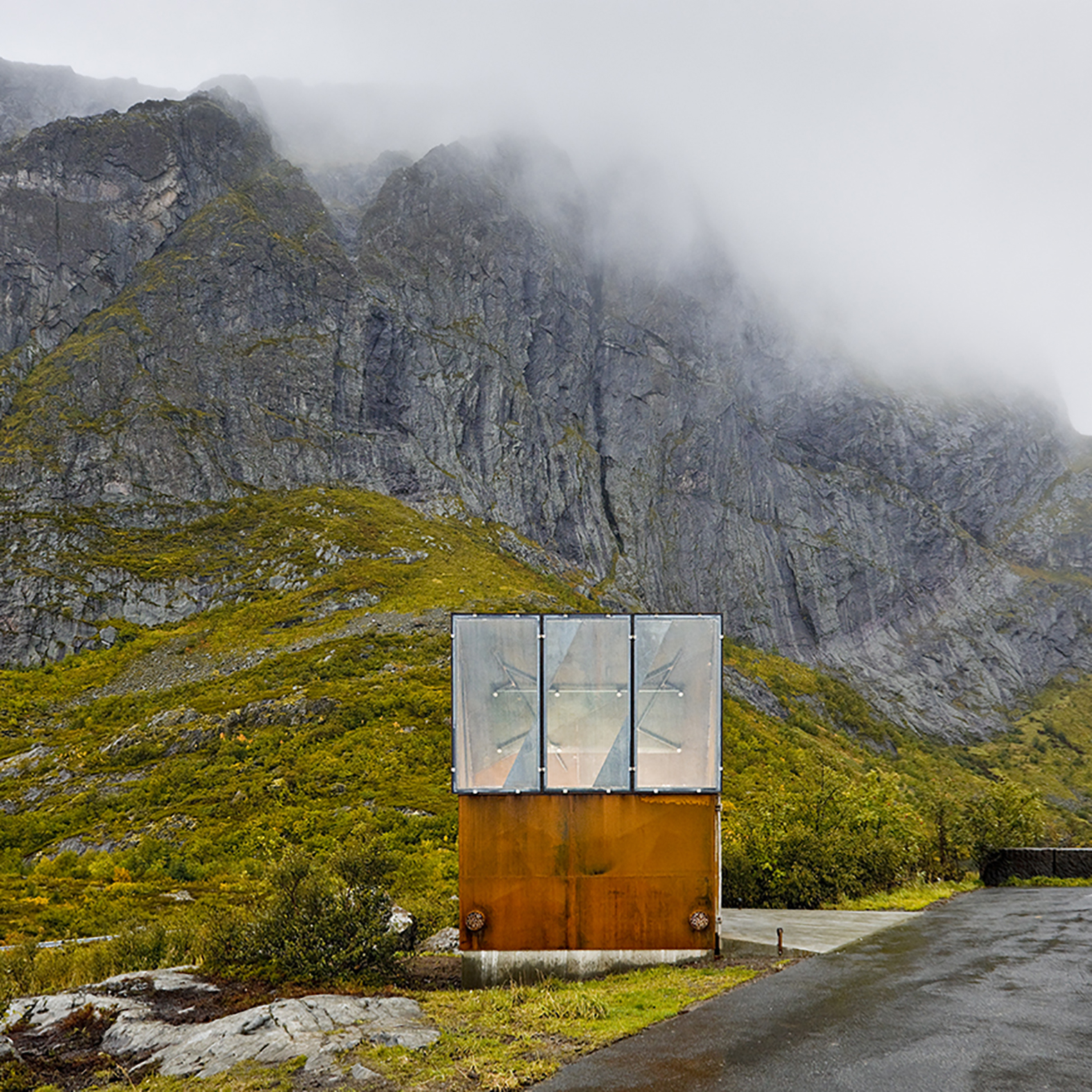
Roadside Toilet Facility by Manthey Kula

Manthey Kula is a Norwegian architecture office founded in 2004 by Beate Hølmebakk and Per Tamsen. Manthey Kula's projects are usually finely crafted buildings, constructions, and landscape interventions with a visible focus on formal and structural clarity.

== Background ==
Tamsen is educated at Lund University. Hølmebakk is educated at the Oslo School of Architecture and Design where she is professor since 2007. She has served as artistic professor at Chalmers University in Gothenburg, Sweden and been a visiting professor at the University of Navarra, Spain and Cornell University, New York.

== Notable works ==
- National Memorial Utøykaia. Hole, Norway. In collaboration with Bureau Bas Smets (2022).
- House Hamburgö. Bohuslän, Sweden (2021)
- National Veteran Monument, Akershus Castle. Oslo, Norway (2021).
- Guest of Honor Pavilion, Frankfurt Bookfair. Frankfurt, Germany. With LCLA Office (2019)
- Skreda Rest Area (National Tourist Routes), Lofoten, Norway (2018)
- Archipelago. Paper Project. Acquired by the Centre FRAC, Val de Loire (2017)
- Forvik Ferry-stop. Vevelstad, Norway (2015)
- Myrbærholmen Fishing Bridges. Averøy, Norway (2010)
- Akkarvik Roadside Restroom. Lofoten, Norway (2009)
- Pålsbu Hydro Power Station. Tunhovd, Norway (2007)

== Nominations and awards ==
- The founding partners B. Hølmebakk and P. Tamsen Hølmebakk received Prince Eugen Medal for outstanding artistic achievement (2022)
- AR House Highly Commended. House Hamburgö
- Nominated for the Mies van der Rohe Award (2020). Guest of Honour Pavilion, Frankfurt Book Fair
- Nominated for the Mies van der Rohe Award (2018). Skreda Rest Area
- Nominated for the Mies van der Rohe Award (2011). Akkarvik Roadside Restroom
- Nominated for the Mies van der Rohe Award (2009). Pålsbu Hydro Power Station
- The Schelling Architecturstiftung. Medal
