= Gjone =

Village in Larvik, Norway

- Village
- Interactive map of Gjone
- Coordinates: 59.18006°N 9.99038°E
- Country: Norway
- Region: Eastern Norway
- County: Vestfold
- District: Vestfold
- Municipality: Larvik Municipality
- Elevation: 30 m (98 ft)
- Time zone: UTC+01:00 (CET)
  - Summer (DST): UTC+02:00 (CEST)
- Post Code: 3282 Kvelde

Gjone is a village in Larvik Municipality in Vestfold county, Norway. The village is located about 3 kilometres (1.9 mi) to the south of the larger village of Kvelde and approximately 15 kilometres (9.3 mi) north of the town of Larvik. Gjone consists of six main farms. The three original farms, Nord Gjone, Mellem Gjone and Gjone Gård, were further divided into other farms due to the old system of land partition, whereby every son inherited his own portion of the land. Today, approximately forty people live in the Gjone area.
