= Tunhovdfjorden =

Lake in Nore og Uvdal, Norway

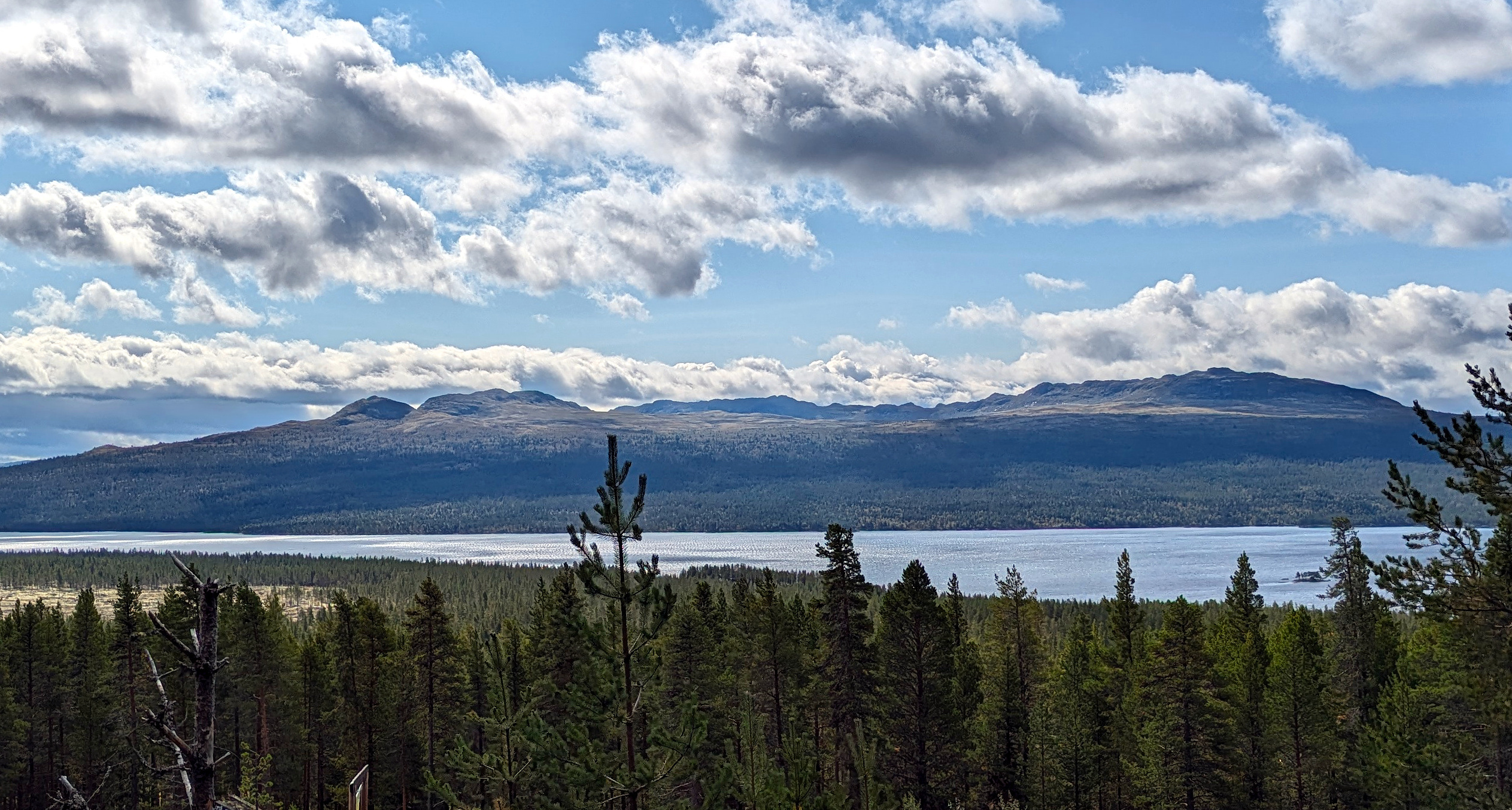

- Location within Norway
- Location: Norway
- Coordinates: 60°22′59″N 08°51′57″E
- Basin countries: Norway
- Surface area: 25.30 km^{2} (9.77 sq mi)

Tunhovdfjorden is a lake in the Nore og Uvdal municipality in Buskerud county, Norway. It has an area of 25.30 km² and a circumference of 62.79 km. It is part of the Numedalslågen watershed. Tunhovdfjorden is known for its trout and is popular for ice fishing.
