= Numedalslågen =

River in Telemark, Norway

Numedalslågen Lågen
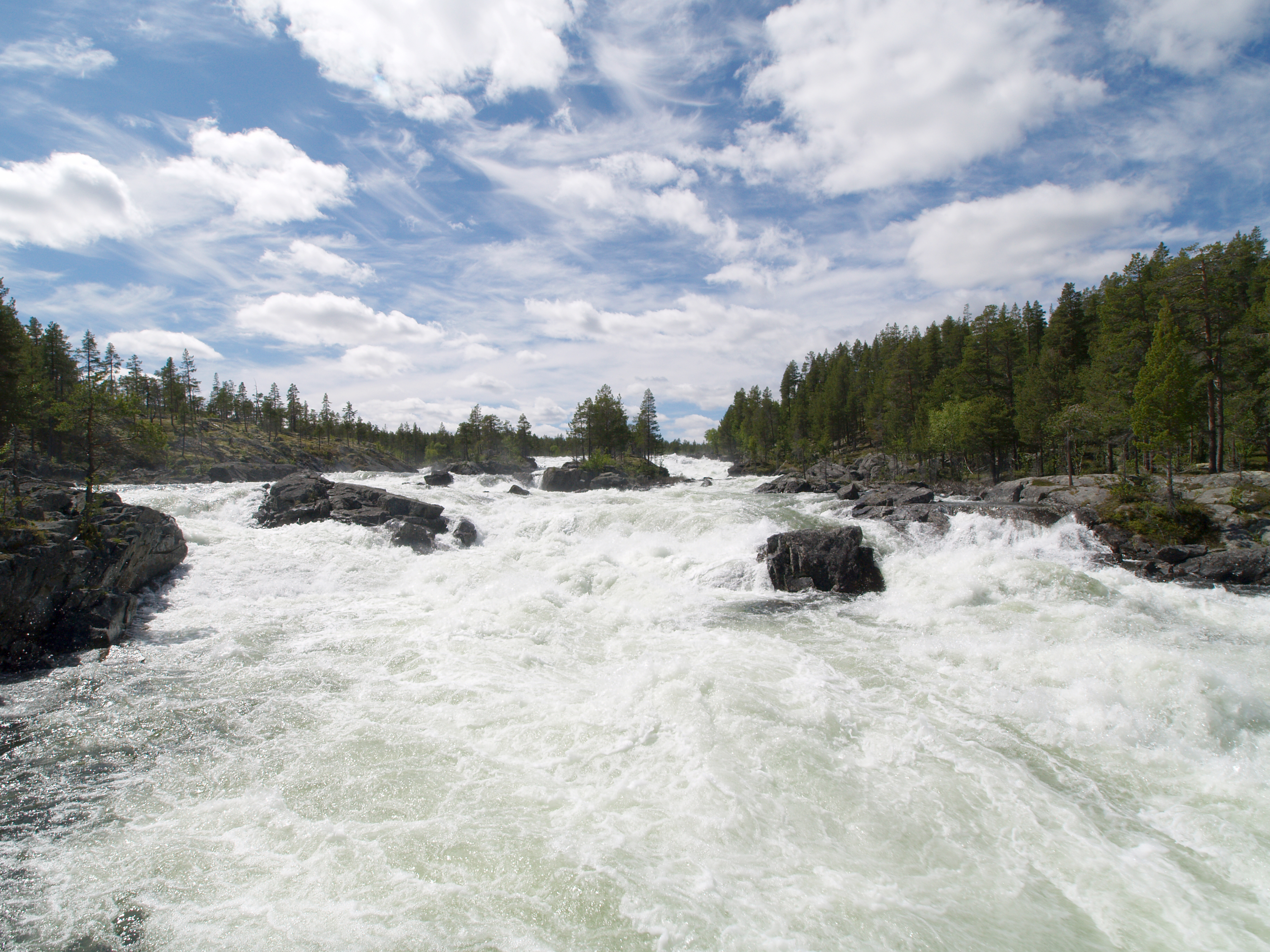
- Numedalslågen at Godfarfossen

- Location of the river Numedalslågen (Norway)

Location
- Country: Norway
- County: Vestland, Buskerud, Vestfold
- Municipalities: Eidfjord, Nore og Uvdal, Hol, Rollag, Flesberg, Kongsberg, Larvik

Physical characteristics
- Source: Hardangervidda plateau
  - location: Eidfjord, Vestland
  - coordinates: 60.234570°N 7.29217529°E
  - elevation: 1,405 metres (4,610 ft)
- Mouth: Larviksfjorden
  - location: Larvik, Vestfold
  - coordinates: 59.0376403°N 10.055065°E
  - elevation: 0 metres (0 ft)
- Length: 356 km (221 mi)
- Basin size: 5,548 km^{2} (2,142 sq mi)
- Discharge
  - average: 111 m^{3}/s (3,900 cu ft/s)

Basin features
- Landmarks: Numedal valley

Numedalslågen is a river in Norway. It is considered to be the second longest river in Southern Norway. It is located in the Numedal valley which runs through the counties of Vestfold, Buskerud and Vestland. At 356 kilometres (221 mi) long, it is one of the longest rivers in Norway.

== Location ==
Numedalslågen begins on the Hardangervidda plateau and it collects in the lake Nordmannslågen which flows into the lake Bjornefjorden before it flows into the main channel of the river. From the Bjornesfjorden, the main river stretches for over 250 kilometres (160 mi) through the counties of Buskerud and Vestfold and then meeting the ocean at the Larviksfjorden at the town of Larvik. Numedalslågen is one of Norway's longest rivers, beginning in Eidfjord Municipality and then running through the municipalities of Nore og Uvdal, Hol, Rollag, Flesberg, Kongsberg, and Larvik. These municipalities cooperate in the administration and use of resources connected to the river in various projects under the Green Valley (Grønn Dal) umbrella.

There are a number of hydroelectric plants in the higher range of Numedalslågen. Most of the power potential of the main river is developed, except the stretch between Hvittingfoss and Larvik and Godfarfossen in Dagali. Nore I kraftverk, the first power plant built in the Nore og Uvdal Municipality in Buskerud county used Norefallene between Tunhovdfjorden and Rødberg. It was completed in 1928 and was designed by Norwegian architects Carl Buch and Lorentz Harboe Ree. The Nore II kraftverk uses the drop between Rødberg dam and the Norefjorden and was completed in 1947.

Numedalslågen is known for being a good location for salmon fishing, although a parasite known as Gyrodactylus salaris has recently been found in Numedalslågen that may pose a threat to its salmon stock. Among the other fish species of Numedalslågen are trout, eel, and pike.

== Name ==
The river is named after the Numedal valley (Old Norse: Nauma). The first element nauma was the original name of the river. The meaning of that old name is unknown. The last element is lǫgr which means "water" or "river".

== Gallery ==
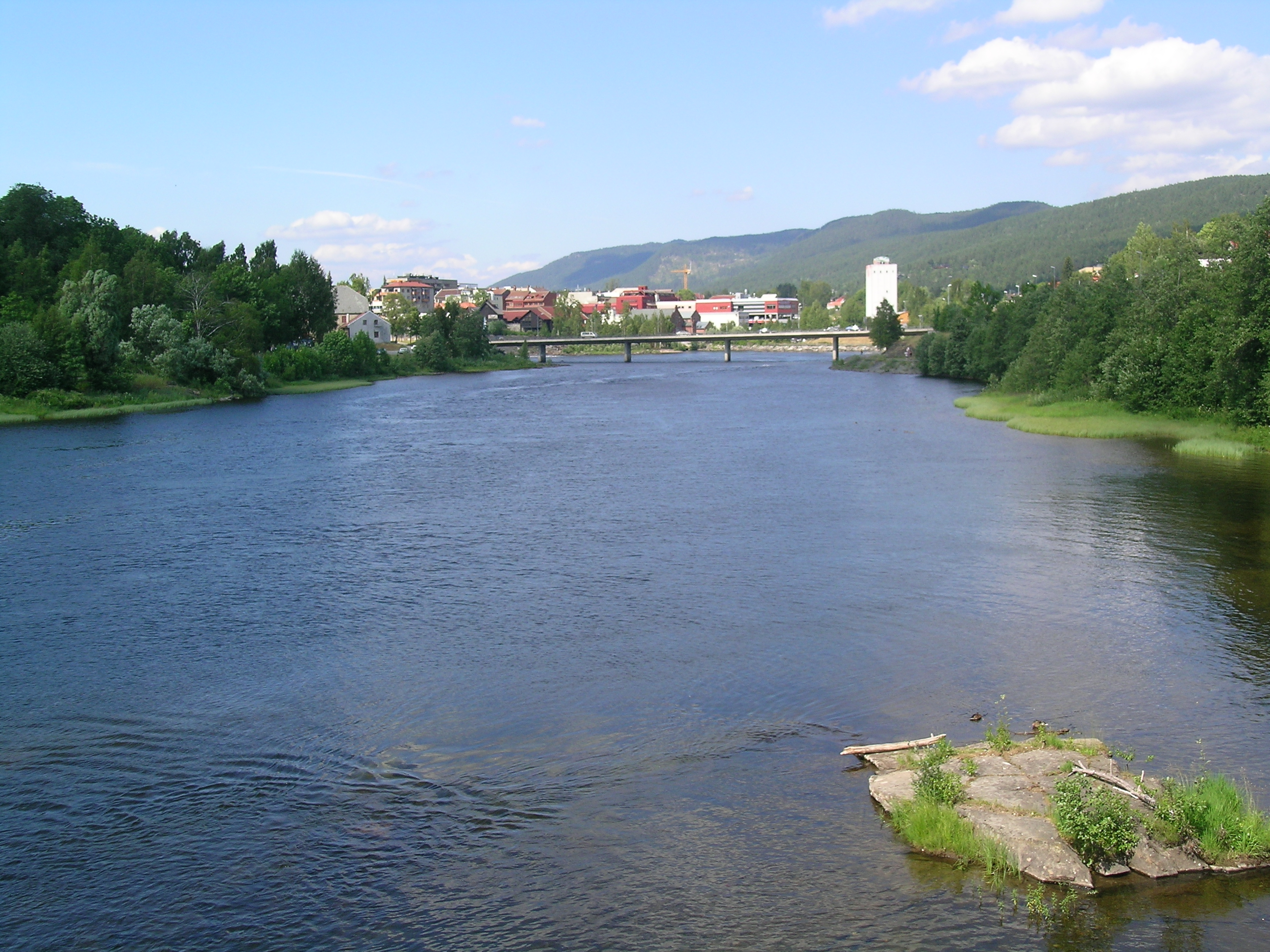
Numedalslågen through Kongsberg

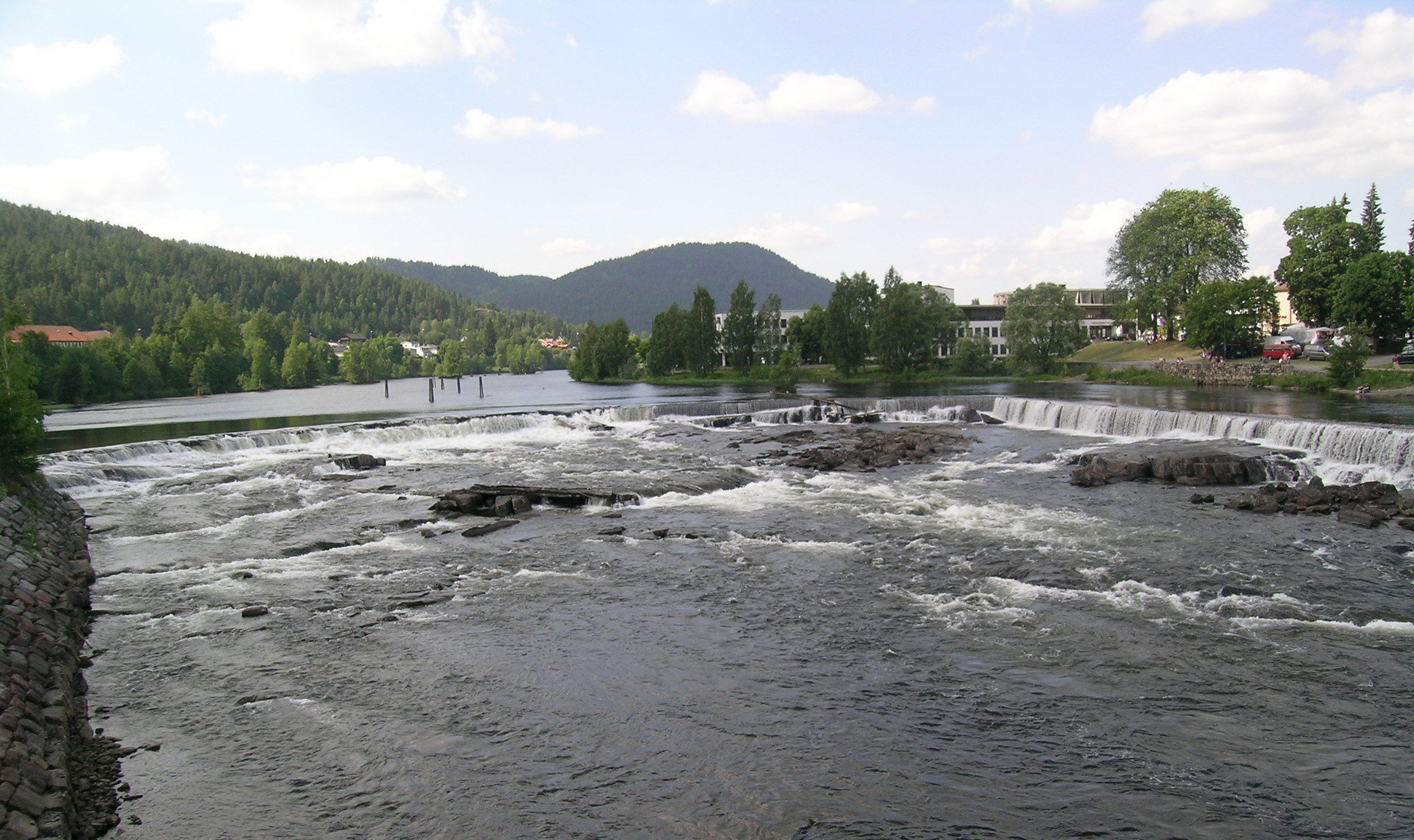
Nybrufoss on Numedalslågen

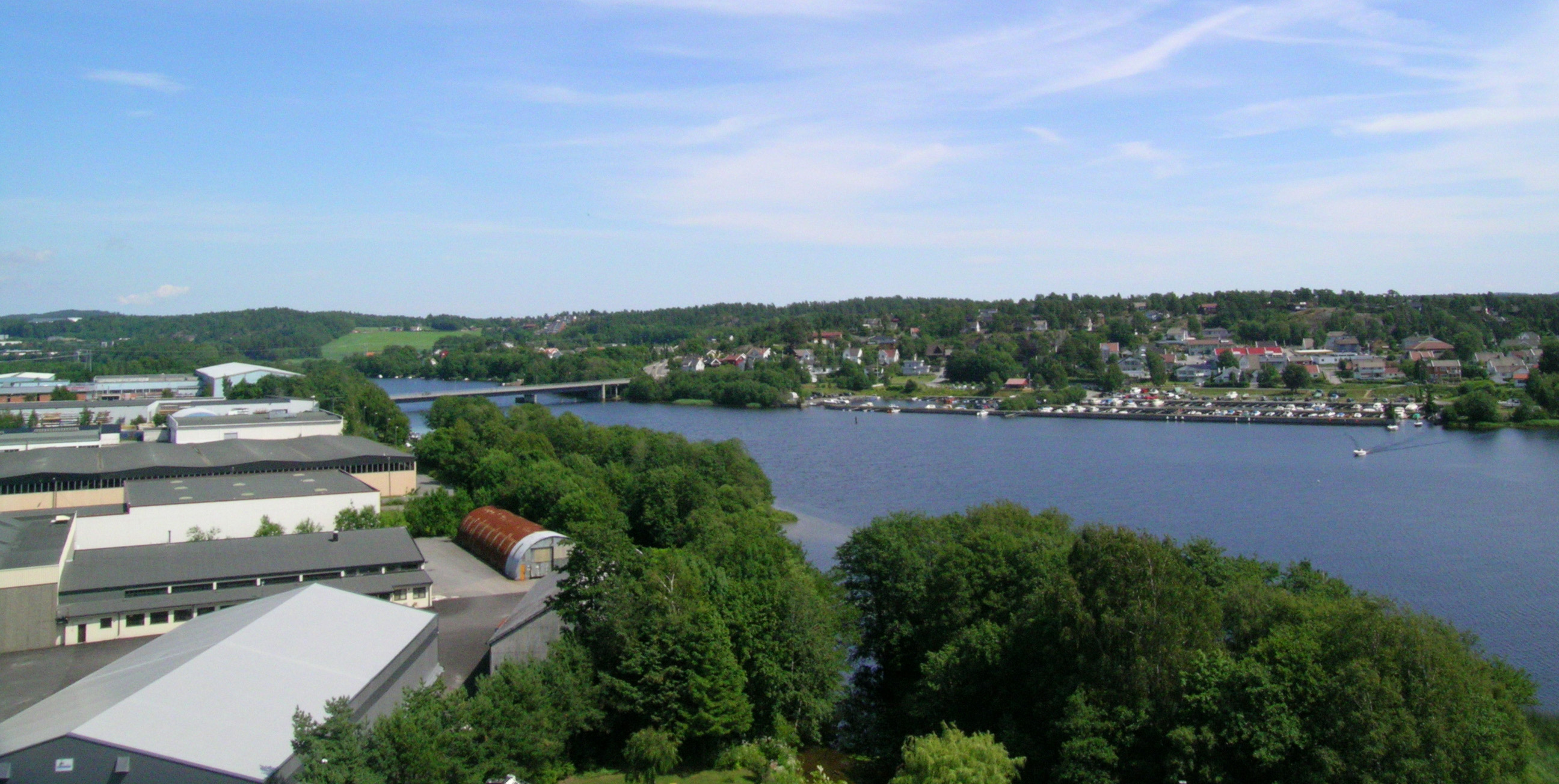
Numedalslågen through Larvik

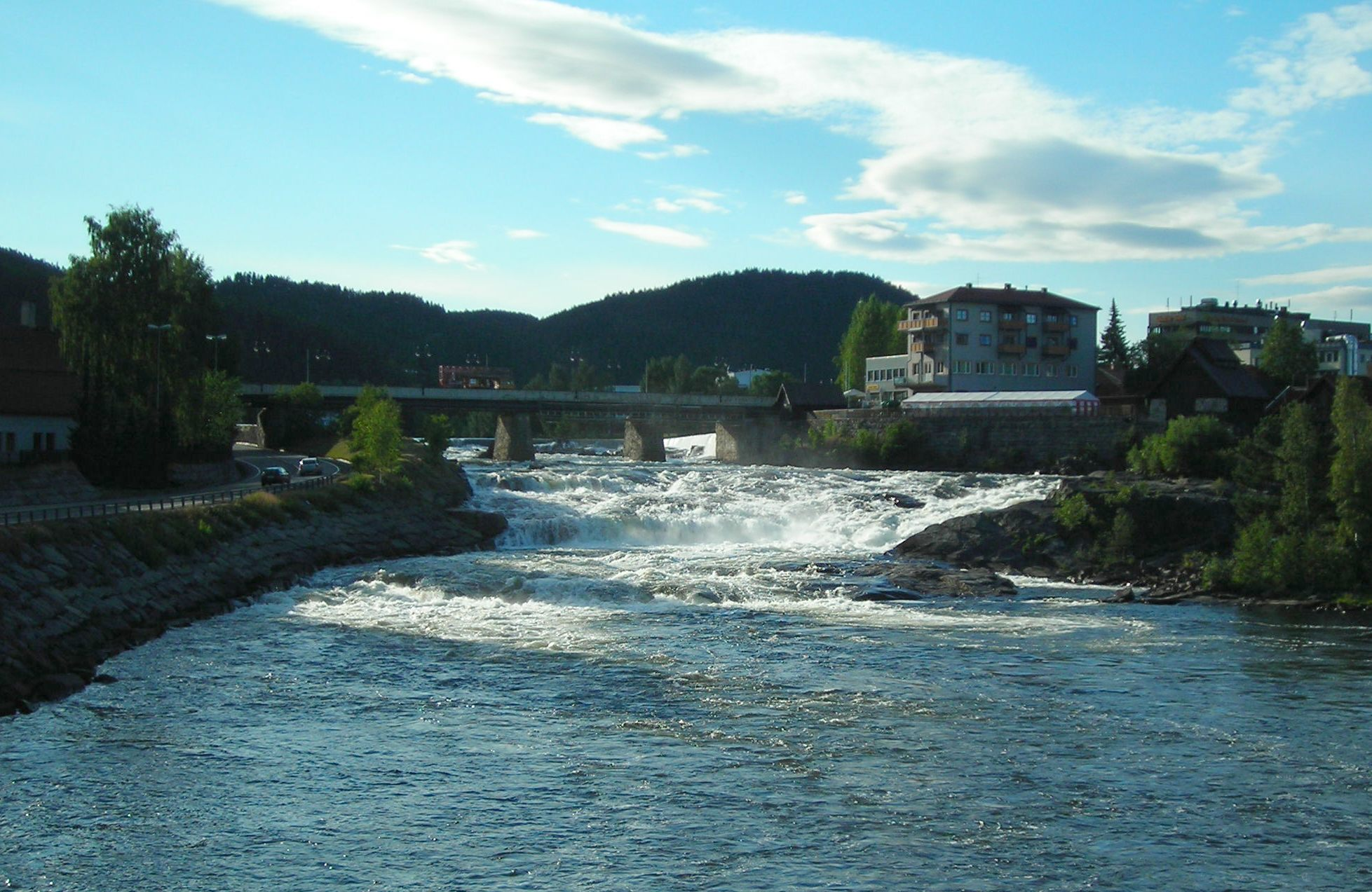
Numedalslågen in Kongsberg

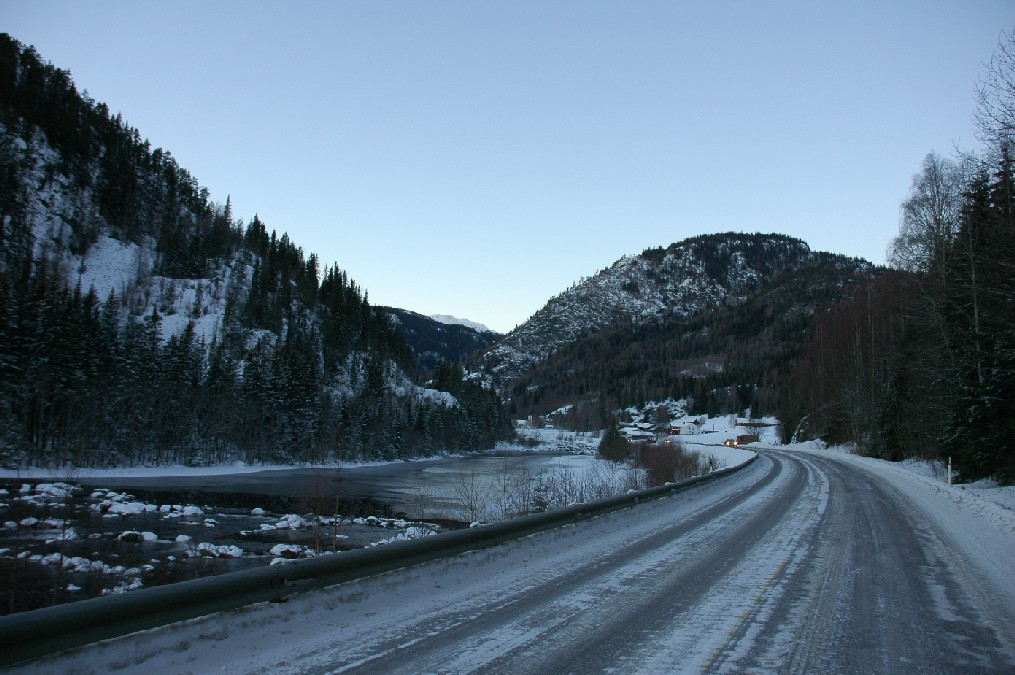
Numedalslågen at Skjønne

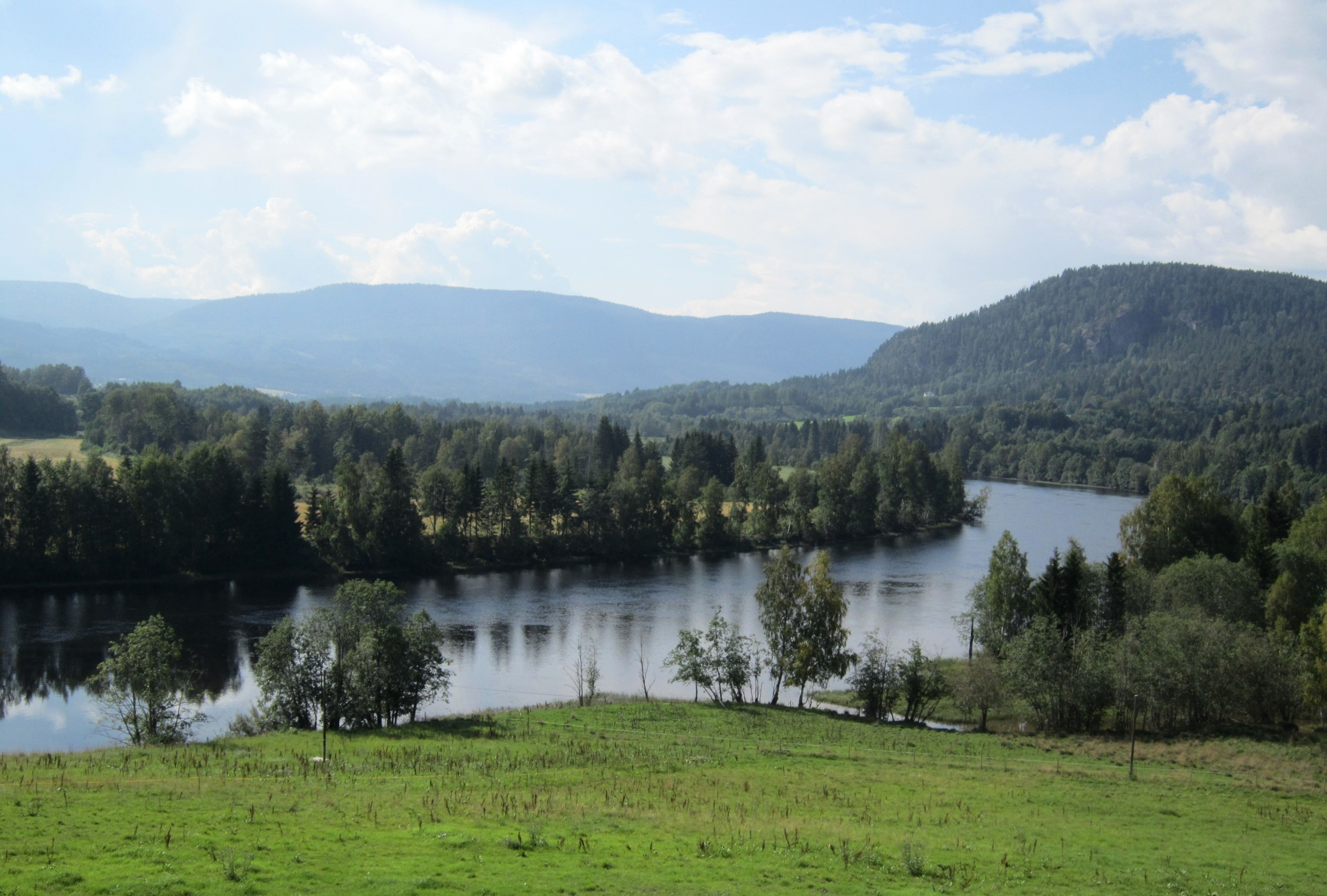
Numedalslågen at Komnes in Sandsvær

== See also ==
- Gudbrandsdalslågen
- List of rivers of Norway
