= Brunlanes Municipality =

Former municipality in Vestfold, Norway

Brunlanes Municipality Brunlanes kommune
- Former municipality
- Brunlanes herred (historic name)
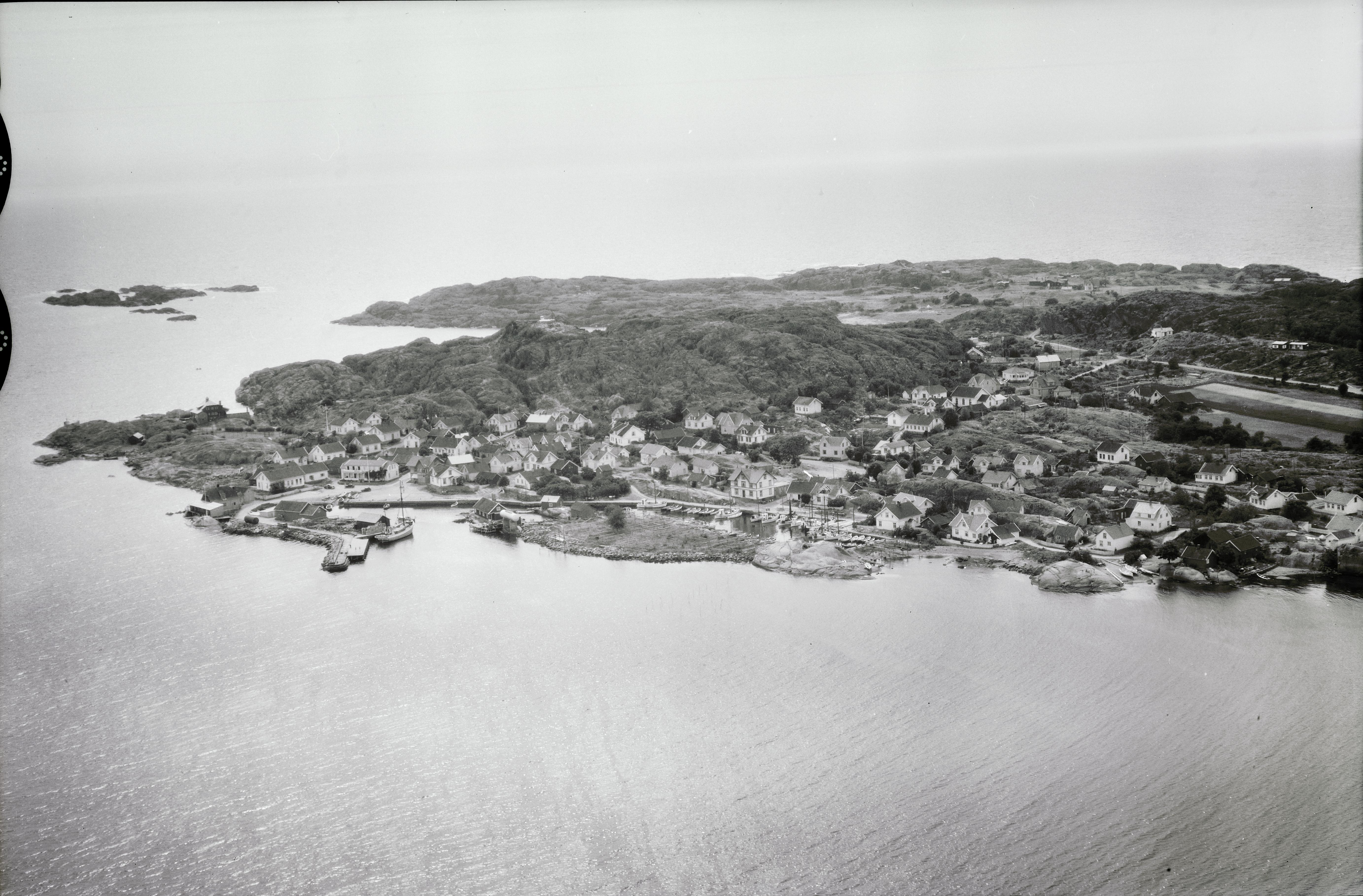
- Old photo of Nevlunghavn

- Coat of arms

- Vestfold within Norway

- Brunlanes within Vestfold
- Coordinates: 59°02′N 9°58′E
- Country: Norway
- County: Vestfold
- Established: 1 Jan 1838
  - Created as: Formannskapsdistrikt
- Disestablished: 1 Jan 1988
  - Succeeded by: Larvik Municipality
- Administrative centre: Tanum

Government
  - Mayor (1976–1987): Bjørg Holmsen (H)

Area (upon dissolution)
  - Total: 189.9 km^{2} (73.3 sq mi)
  - Rank: #335 in Norway
- Highest elevation (Metalen): 304 m (997 ft)

Population (1987)
  - Total: 8,138
  - Rank: #124 in Norway
  - Density: 42.9/km^{2} (111/sq mi)
  - Change (10 years): ▲ +10.9%
- Demonym: Brunlanesing

Official language
  - Norwegian form: Bokmål
- Time zone: UTC+01:00 (CET)
  - Summer (DST): UTC+02:00 (CEST)
- ISO 3166 code: NO-0726

Brunlanes (Norwegian pronunciation: [²bɾʉnːlɑˌneːs]; locally [²bɾʉnːlɑˌneːʂ]) is a former municipality in Vestfold county, Norway. The 189.9-square-kilometre (73.3 sq mi) municipality existed from 1838 until its dissolution in 1988. The area is now part of Larvik Municipality. The administrative centre was the village of Tanum. Other villages in Brunlanes include Kjose, Nevlunghavn, Vardåsen, and Helgeroa.

Prior to its dissolution in 1988, the 189.9-square-kilometre (73.3 sq mi) municipality was the 335th largest by area out of the 454 municipalities in Norway. Brunlanes Municipality was the 124th most populous municipality in Norway with a population of about 8,138. The municipality's population density was 42.9 inhabitants per square kilometre (111/sq mi) and its population had increased by 10.9% over the previous 10-year period.

Brunlanes Municipality had some of the best agricultural land in Vestfold County. Farming was the main industry in the municipality with considerable vegetable and grain cultivation. Brunlanes Municipality was particularly known for its strawberry cultivation. It was also known for its forestry and wood processing industry. A large moraine runs into the ocean in the far southwestern part of the municipality.

== General information ==
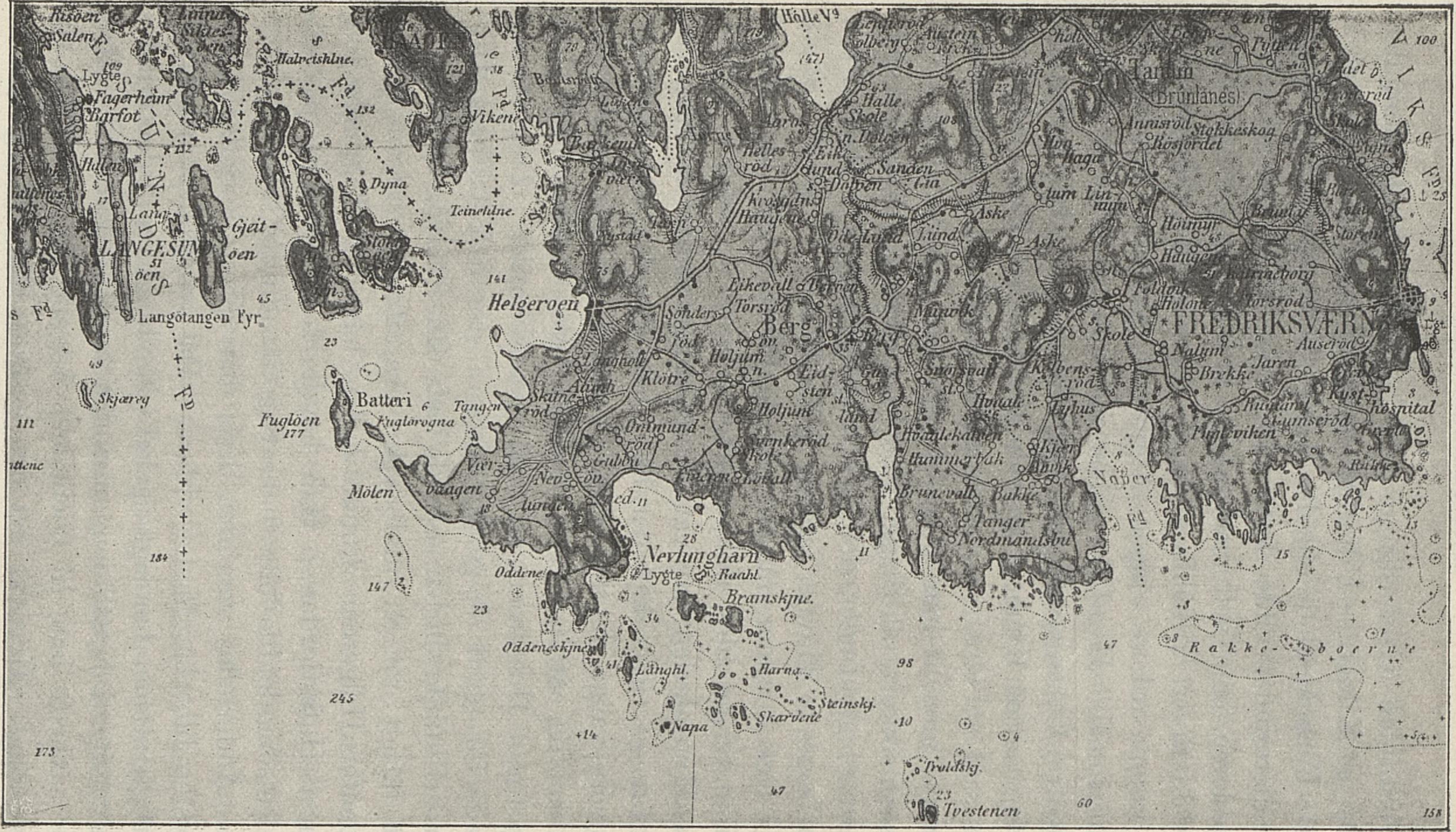
Map of Brunlanes in 1905

=== Administrative history ===
The formannskapsdistrikt law of 1837 created a system of local government in Norway by establishing each town (ladested or kjøpstad) and each Church of Norway prestegjeld as a civil municipality. On 1 January 1838, Brunlagnæs prestegjeld was established as Brunlagnæs Municipality (later spelled Brunlanes).

On 1 January 1875, a small area of Brunlanes Municipality (population: 4) was transferred to the neighboring Larvik Municipality. On 23 June 1883, an area of Brunlanes Municipality (population: 22) was transferred to the neighboring Fredriksvern Municipality after a border adjustment. In 1938, another area of Brunlanes Municipality (population: 28) became part of Fredriksvern Municipality. In 1949, another area of Brunlanes Municipality (population: 13) became part of Stavern Municipality.

During the 1960s, there were many municipal mergers across Norway due to the work of the Schei Committee. On 1 January 1964, the Enigheten, Høyberg, and Skavåsen farms (population: 12) was transferred from Brunlanes Municipality to the neighboring Porsgrunn Municipality (this also caused the area to switch from Vestfold county to Telemark county). On 1 January 1969, a small area of Brunlanes Municipality (population: 4) became part of Stavern Municipality.

On 1 January 1988, Brunlanes Municipality was dissolved and the following areas were merged to form an enlarged Larvik Municipality with a population of people:

- all of Brunlanes Municipality (population: 8,138)
- all of Hedrum Municipality (population: 10,449)
- all of Larvik Municipality (population: 8,045)
- all of Stavern Municipality (population: 2,538)
- all of Tjølling Municipality (population: 7,878)

=== Name ===
The municipality is named after the old Brunlanes prestegjeld. The prestegjeld name was a composition of the old Brunla farm and an old name for the area Nesjar. Prior to 1879, the name was written "Brunlagnæs" (with variations in the spelling). From 1879 to 1888 it was spelled "Brunlanæs". In 1889, the spelling was updated to "Brunlanes". The meaning of the first element is uncertain. It may come from brunnr which means "well" or "spring" or the name could come from the word brún which means "sharp edge" or "rim". The second element comes from the word lá which means "the line of the shoal water along the shore". The last element is nes which means "headland" (since the area lies between the Langesundsfjorden, the sea, and the lake Farris).

=== Coat of arms ===
The coat of arms was approved on 29 August 1985. The official blazon was "Azure, twelve plates 3-4-5" (Norwegian: I blått tolv sølv mynter). This means the arms have a blue field (background) and the charge is a set of twelve plates (circles) that are lined up in three rows (3 circles in the top row, f circles in the next row, and 5 circles in the bottom row). The circles have a tincture of argent which means they are commonly colored white, but if it is made out of metal, then silver is used. The blue color in the field symbolized the importance of the sea and the small circles symbolised the typical round stones (made by glaciers), which can be found in huge quantities in the municipality. The arms were designed by Kjell Ronald Hansen. The municipal flag had the same design as the coat of arms.

=== Churches ===
The Church of Norway had three parishes (sokn) within Brunlanes Municipality. At the time of the municipal dissolution, it was part of the Brunlanes prestegjeld and the Larvik prosti (deanery) in the Diocese of Tunsberg.

Churches in Brunlanes Municipality
Prestegjeld	Parish (sokn)	Church name	Location of the church	Year built
Brunlanes	Tanum	Tanum Church	Tanum	c. 1100
Brunlanes	Kjose	Kjose Church	Kjose	1850
Brunlanes	Berg	Old Berg Church	Berg	c. 1100
Brunlanes	Berg	Berg Church	Berg	1878

The Old Berg Church was built of stone around the year 1100. The old medieval church was partially demolished in 1882, after the "new" Berg Church had been built on the site in 1878. The remains of the walls were preserved and from 1965 to 1970, the church was restored partly with the original stone. The church has conservation status protected.

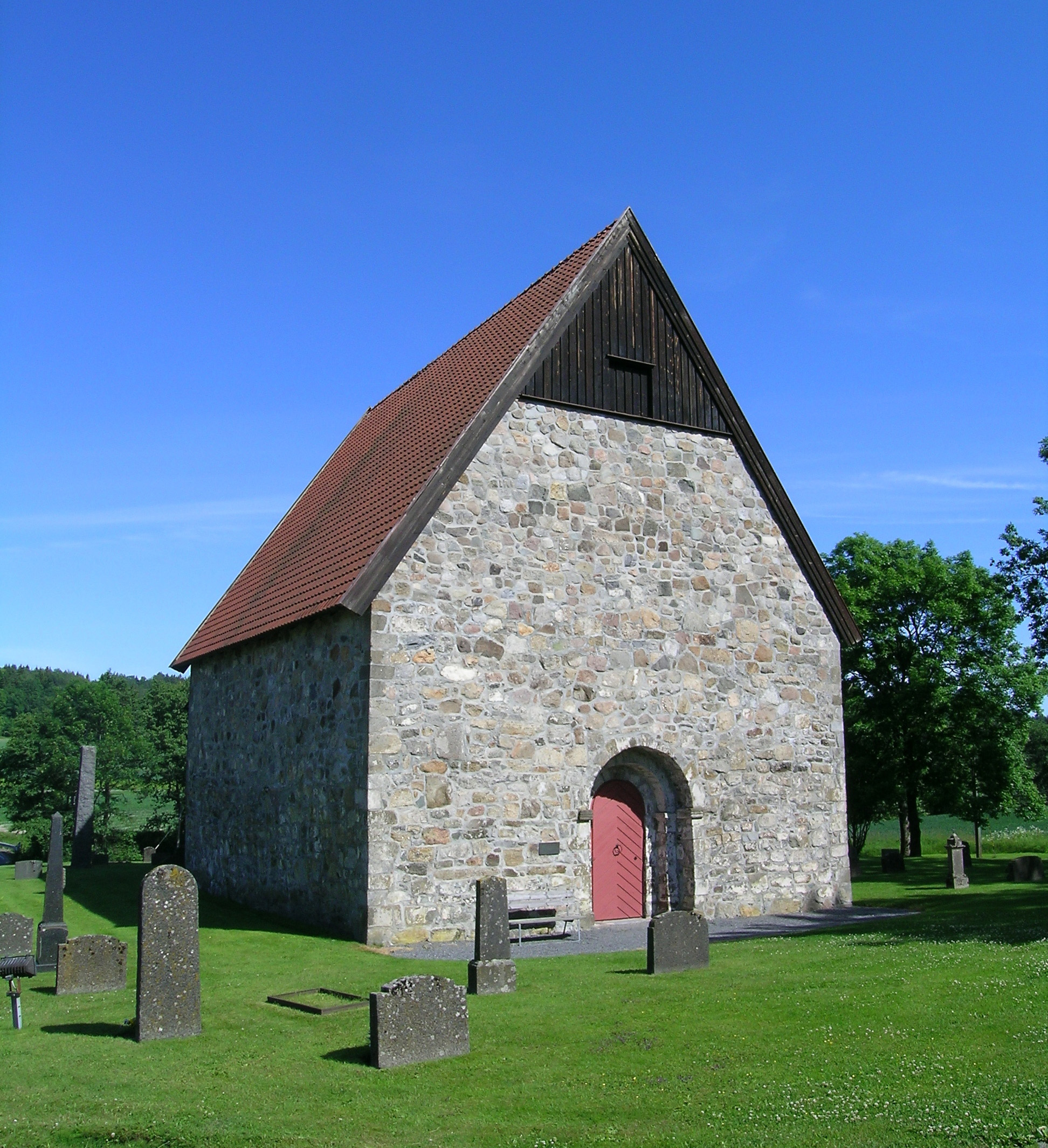
Old Berg Church

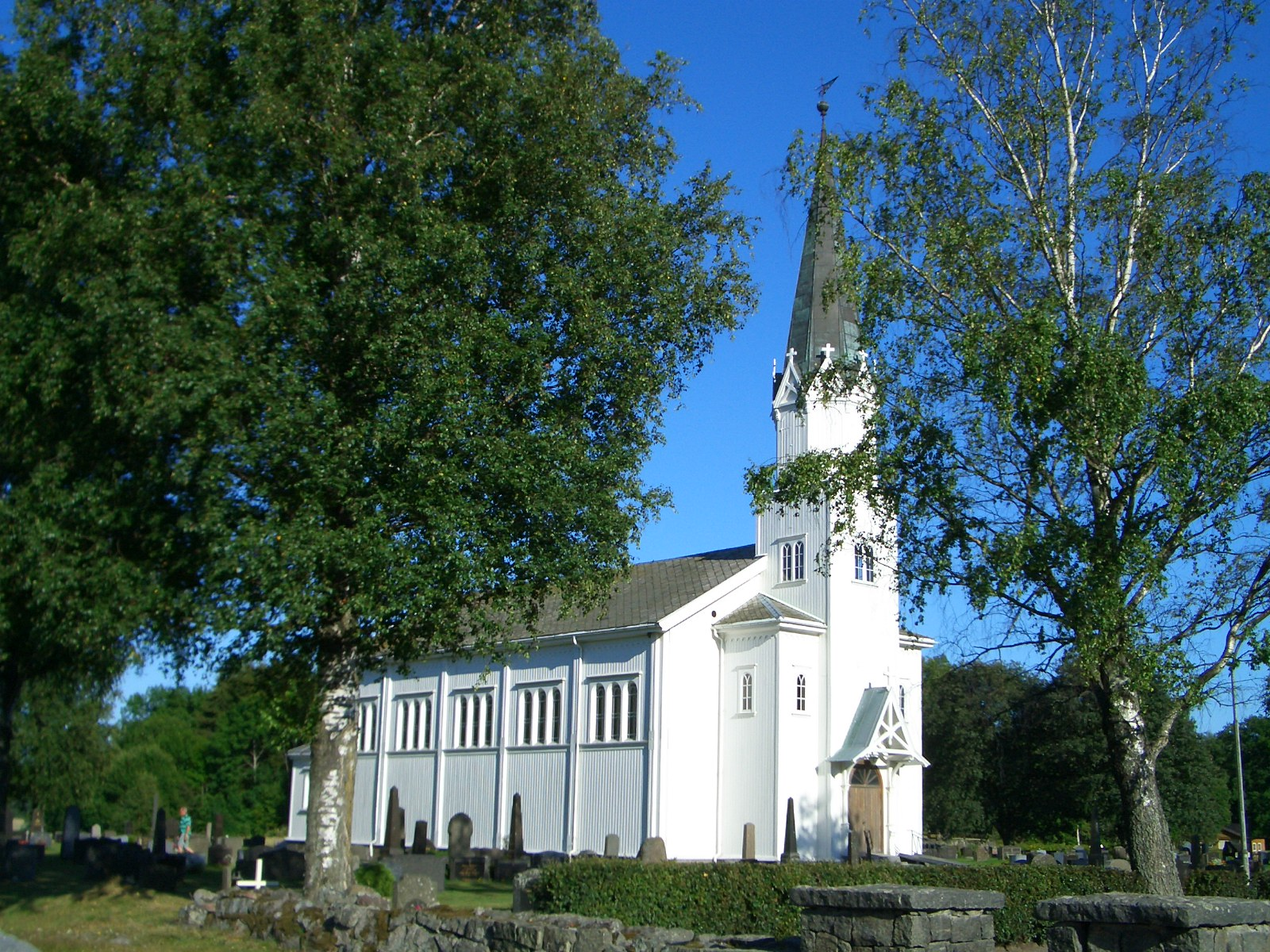
Berg Church

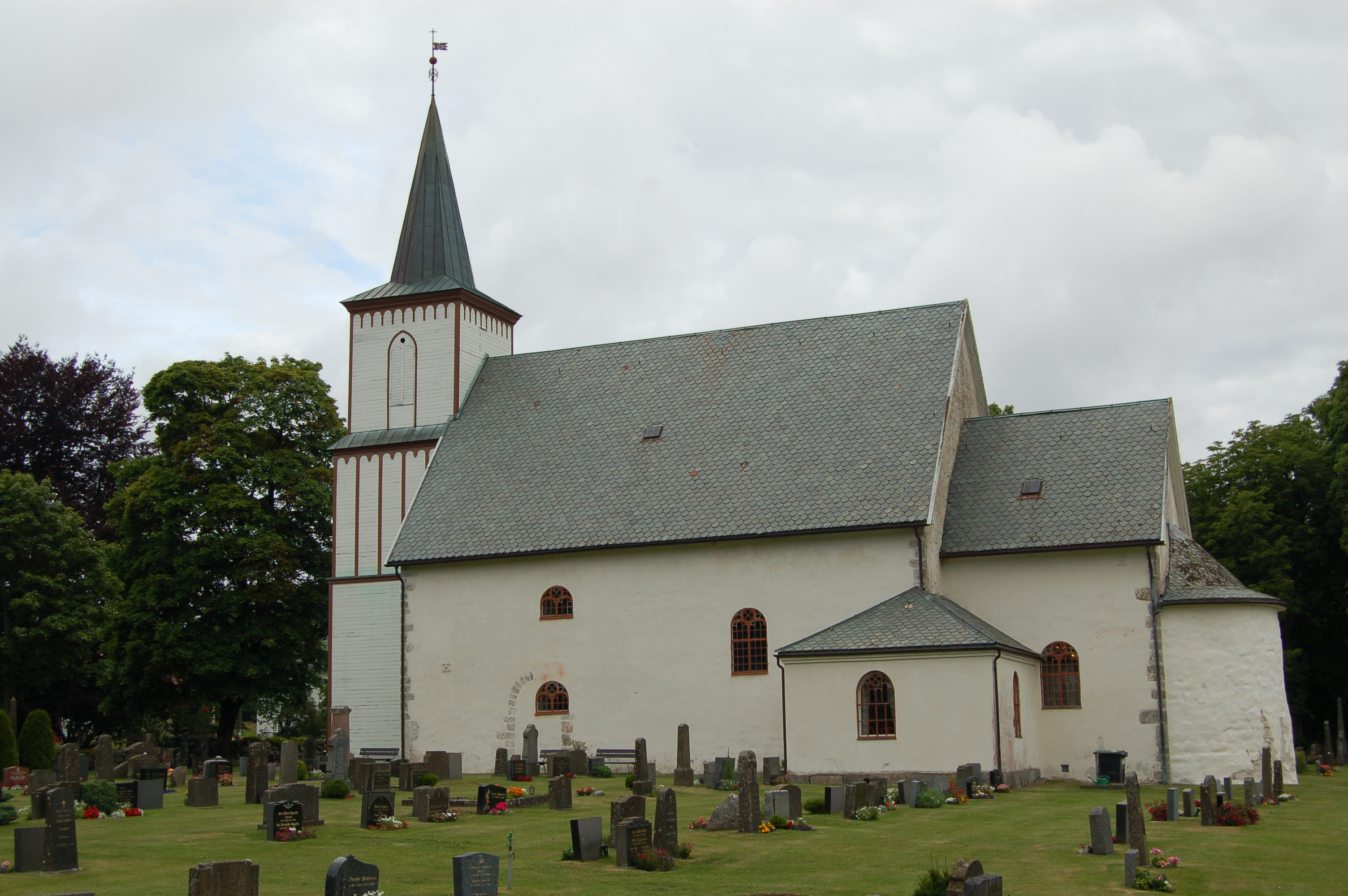
Tanum Church

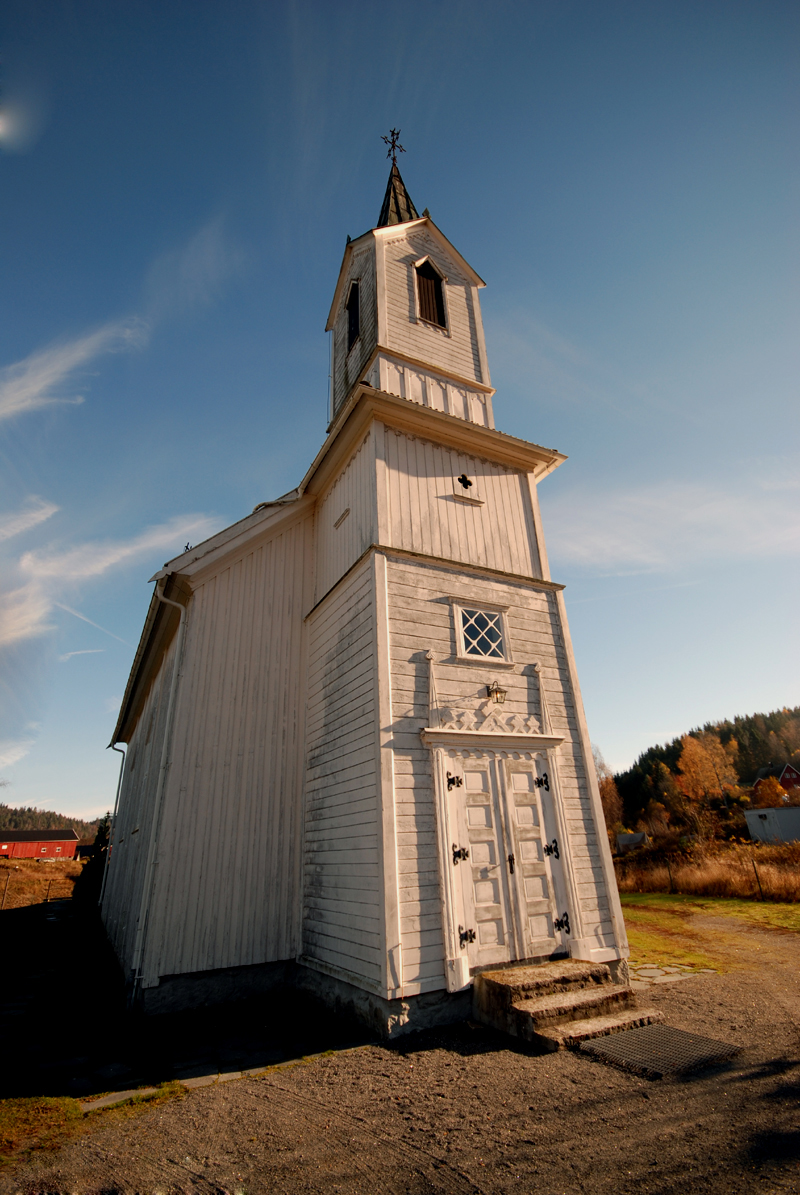
Kjose Church

== Geography ==
The highest point in the municipality was the 304-metre (997 ft) tall mountain Metalen, located on the border with Porsgrunn Municipality. Hedrum Municipality was located to the north, Larvik Municipality was located to the east, Stavern Municipality was located to the southeast, the Skagerrak was located to the south, and Porsgrunn Municipality (in Telemark county) was located to the west.

== History ==
There are many historical relics in the area that was Brunlanes Municipality, including many burial mounds from the Iron Age and Bronze Age. The Old Berg Church at Berg, which was erected in the 1100s, was located in the municipality. The church fell into ruin by the 1960s, but it has been rebuilt and features a clear-cut architecture with a red tilestone roof.

== Government ==
While it existed, Brunlanes Municipality was responsible for primary education (through 10th grade), outpatient health services, senior citizen services, welfare and other social services, zoning, economic development, and municipal roads and utilities. The municipality was governed by a municipal council of directly elected representatives. The mayor was indirectly elected by a vote of the municipal council. The municipality was under the jurisdiction of the Larvik District Court and the Agder Court of Appeal.

=== Municipal council ===
The municipal council (Kommunestyre) of Brunlanes Municipality was made up of representatives that were elected to four year terms. The tables below show the historical composition of the council by political party.

Brunlanes kommunestyre 1983–1987
Party name (in Norwegian)	Number of representatives
Labour Party (Arbeiderpartiet)	10
Conservative Party (Høyre)	11
Christian Democratic Party (Kristelig Folkeparti)	4
Centre Party (Senterpartiet)	1
Socialist Left Party (Sosialistisk Venstreparti)	1
Liberal Party (Venstre)	2
Total number of members:	29
Note: On 1 January 1988, Brunlanes Municipality became part of Larvik Municipality.

Brunlanes kommunestyre 1979–1983
Party name (in Norwegian)	Number of representatives
Labour Party (Arbeiderpartiet)	10
Conservative Party (Høyre)	10
Christian Democratic Party (Kristelig Folkeparti)	4
Centre Party (Senterpartiet)	2
Liberal Party (Venstre)	3
Total number of members:	29

Brunlanes kommunestyre 1975–1979
Party name (in Norwegian)	Number of representatives
Labour Party (Arbeiderpartiet)	10
Conservative Party (Høyre)	5
Christian Democratic Party (Kristelig Folkeparti)	4
Centre Party (Senterpartiet)	2
Liberal Party (Venstre)	3
Brulanes Independents List (Brunlanes Uavhengige Liste)	1
Total number of members:	25

Brunlanes kommunestyre 1971–1975
Party name (in Norwegian)	Number of representatives
Labour Party (Arbeiderpartiet)	11
Conservative Party (Høyre)	3
Christian Democratic Party (Kristelig Folkeparti)	3
Centre Party (Senterpartiet)	3
Liberal Party (Venstre)	5
Total number of members:	25

Brunlanes kommunestyre 1967–1971
Party name (in Norwegian)	Number of representatives
Labour Party (Arbeiderpartiet)	11
Conservative Party (Høyre)	4
Christian Democratic Party (Kristelig Folkeparti)	2
Centre Party (Senterpartiet)	2
Liberal Party (Venstre)	6
Total number of members:	25

Brunlanes kommunestyre 1963–1967
Party name (in Norwegian)	Number of representatives
Labour Party (Arbeiderpartiet)	12
Conservative Party (Høyre)	4
Christian Democratic Party (Kristelig Folkeparti)	2
Centre Party (Senterpartiet)	2
Liberal Party (Venstre)	5
Total number of members:	25

Brunlanes herredsstyre 1959–1963
Party name (in Norwegian)	Number of representatives
Labour Party (Arbeiderpartiet)	11
Conservative Party (Høyre)	3
Christian Democratic Party (Kristelig Folkeparti)	4
Liberal Party (Venstre)	6
Local List(s) (Lokale lister)	1
Total number of members:	25

Brunlanes herredsstyre 1955–1959
Party name (in Norwegian)	Number of representatives
Labour Party (Arbeiderpartiet)	10
Conservative Party (Høyre)	3
Christian Democratic Party (Kristelig Folkeparti)	4
Farmers' Party (Bondepartiet)	2
Liberal Party (Venstre)	6
Total number of members:	25

Brunlanes herredsstyre 1951–1955
Party name (in Norwegian)	Number of representatives
Labour Party (Arbeiderpartiet)	9
Conservative Party (Høyre)	3
Christian Democratic Party (Kristelig Folkeparti)	4
Farmers' Party (Bondepartiet)	1
Liberal Party (Venstre)	7
Total number of members:	24

Brunlanes herredsstyre 1947–1951
Party name (in Norwegian)	Number of representatives
Labour Party (Arbeiderpartiet)	7
Conservative Party (Høyre)	2
Communist Party (Kommunistiske Parti)	1
Christian Democratic Party (Kristelig Folkeparti)	2
Farmers' Party (Bondepartiet)	1
Joint list of the Liberal Party (Venstre) and the Radical People's Party (Radikale Folkepartiet)	11
Total number of members:	24

Brunlanes herredsstyre 1945–1947
Party name (in Norwegian)	Number of representatives
Labour Party (Arbeiderpartiet)	8
Conservative Party (Høyre)	2
Communist Party (Kommunistiske Parti)	1
Christian Democratic Party (Kristelig Folkeparti)	2
Farmers' Party (Bondepartiet)	1
Joint list of the Liberal Party (Venstre) and the Radical People's Party (Radikale Folkepartiet)	10
Total number of members:	24

Brunlanes herredsstyre 1937–1941*
Party name (in Norwegian)	Number of representatives
Labour Party (Arbeiderpartiet)	8
Farmers' Party (Bondepartiet)	1
Liberal Party (Venstre)	11
Joint List(s) of Non-Socialist Parties (Borgerlige Felleslister)	4
Total number of members:	24
Note: Due to the German occupation of Norway during World War II, no elections were held for new municipal councils until after the war ended in 1945.

=== Mayors ===
The mayor (Norwegian: ordfører) of Brunlanes Municipality was the political leader of the municipality and the chairperson of the municipal council. The following people have held this position:

- 1838–1846: Paul Winsnes
- 1846–1851: Hans Cato Aall
- 1852–1854: Finn Wedel Jarlsberg
- 1855–1863: Carl Didrik Hoppe
- 1864–1867: Hans Nilsen Bentsrød
- 1868–1875: Carl Didrik Hoppe
- 1876–1877: Bredo Stang
- 1878–1881: Knut Jensen Bergene
- 1882–1885: Nils Johansen Dolven
- 1886–1891: Ole Torgersen Bakkene
- 1892–1916: Martin Olsen Nalum (V)
- 1916–1922: Nils S. Waale
- 1923–1935: Louis Narvesen
- 1935–1941: Karl Edvardsen (V)
- 1946–1951: Karl Edvardsen (V)
- 1952–1959: Arne Olsen Nalum (V)
- 1960–1961: Karl Bærug (V)
- 1962–1963: Alf Støen (Ap)
- 1964–1967: Harald Flesche (V)
- 1968–1975: Eystein Bærug (V)
- 1976–1987: Bjørg Holmsen (H)

== Recreation ==
The Brunlanes area has Vestfold’s longest coastal hiking trails. The main trail begins at the bay Ødegårdsbukta in the west and goes through Helgeroa on its way to Mølen Geopark. Along the trail are various beaches, campsites, and unique coastal landscapes. The trail from Mølen to Nevlunghavn is 3.5 kilometres (2.2 mi) and passes by Nevlungstranda Nature Preserve. The trail continues from Nevlunghavn to Løvallodden and later Guslandsmarka. The last section of the trail leads from Gusland to the beach Nalumstranda in the innermost parts of the Naverfjorden. The trailhead is located at Hummerbakken Nature Preserve by the Hummerbakkfjord. The 8 kilometres (5.0 mi) from Nalumstranda to Stavern leads through beaches, coastal landscapes, forests, and slopes of naked rocks on its way to Røvika. It also leads by the home of the artist Odd Nerdrum. There are panoramic views at Rakke of nearby areas such as Røvika in the west and Skagerrak in the south. There are also remains of World War II fortifications here such as concrete gun pits. The trail ends at Fredriksvern Verft in Stavern, a former naval base with buildings dated to the 17th century.

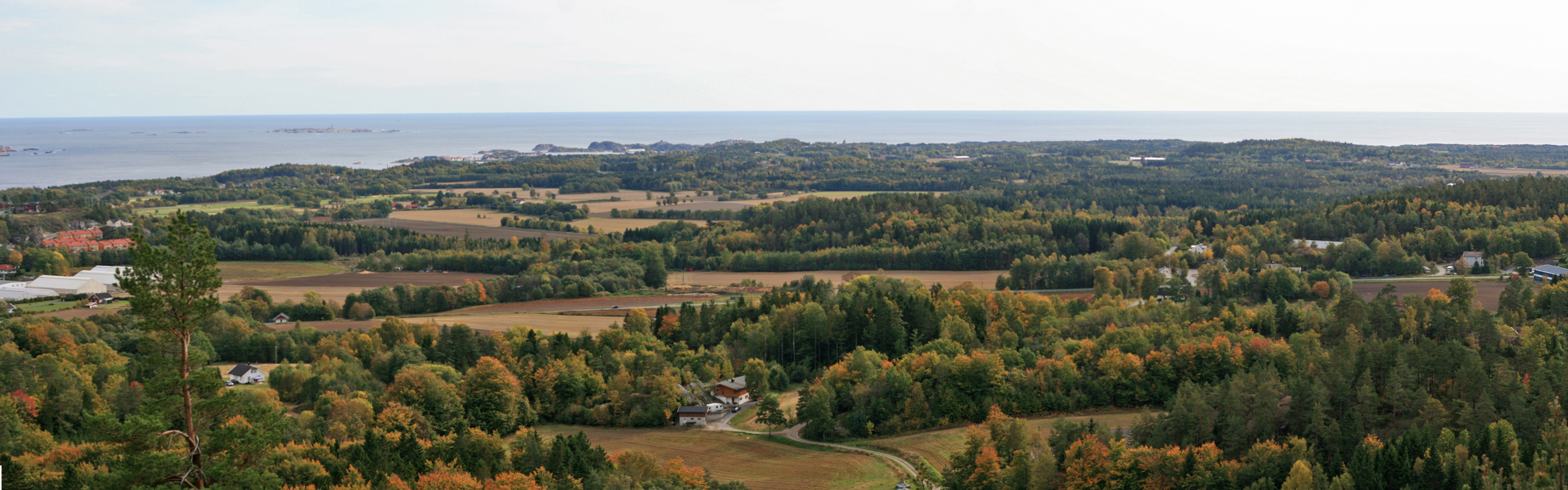
View of the landscape of Brunlanes

== See also ==
- List of former municipalities of Norway
