= Berg Church =

Berg Church may refer to several churches:

- Berg Church (Halden), a church in Halden municipality, Østfold county, Norway
- Berg Church (Senja), a church in Senja municipality, Troms county, Norway
- Berg Church (Trondheim), a church in Trondheim municipality, Trøndelag county, Norway
- Berg Church (Vestfold), a church in Larvik municipality, Vestfold county, Norway
- Berg Arbeidskirke, a church in Larvik municipality, Vestfold county, Norway
- Old Berg Church, a historic church in Larvik municipality, Vestfold county, Norway
