= Berg Arbeidskirke =

Church in Vestfold, Norway

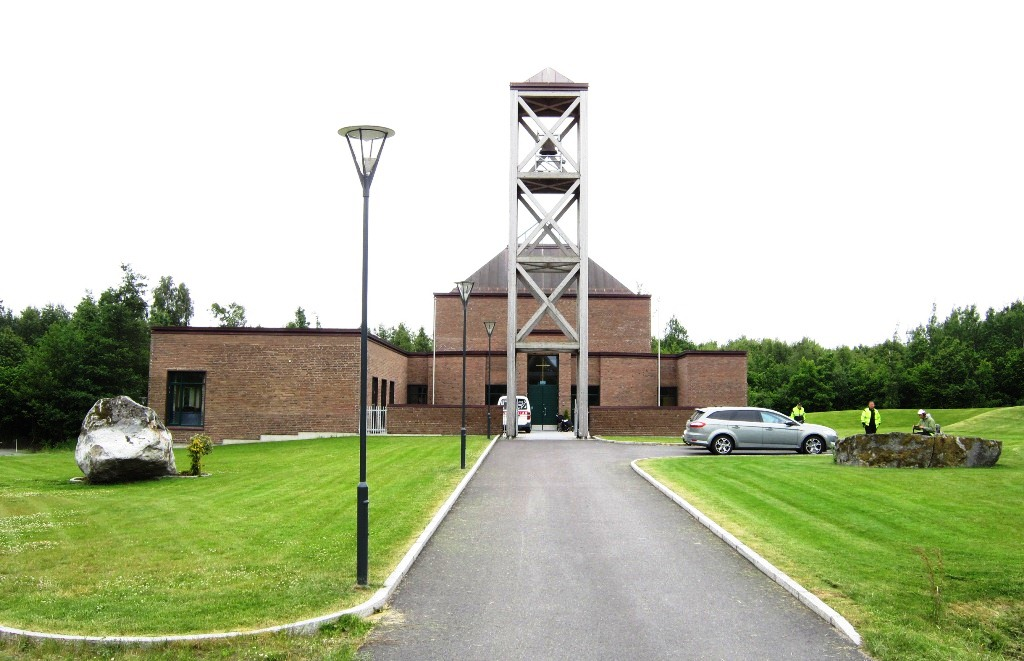
- View of the church
- Berg Arbeidskirke
- 58°59′07″N 9°52′09″E
- Location: Larvik Municipality, Vestfold
- Country: Norway
- Denomination: Church of Norway
- Churchmanship: Evangelical Lutheran

History
- Status: Parish church
- Founded: 2007
- Consecrated: 28 Jan 2007

Architecture
- Functional status: Active
- Architect: Reidar Aasen
- Architectural type: Rectangular
- Completed: 2007 (19 years ago)

Specifications
- Capacity: 200
- Materials: Brick

Administration
- Diocese: Tunsberg
- Deanery: Larvik prosti
- Parish: Berg

Berg Arbeidskirke (lit. 'Berg working church') is a parish church of the Church of Norway in Larvik Municipality in Vestfold county, Norway. It is located in the village of Helgeroa. It is one of the churches for the Berg parish which is part of the Larvik prosti (deanery) in the Diocese of Tunsberg. The brick church was built in a rectangular design in 2007 using plans drawn up by the architect Reidar Aasen from the architectural firm Børve og Bochsenius. The church seats about 200 people.

== History ==
Historically, the people living in the southern part of Brunlanes were able to use the Old Berg Church. In 1878, a "new" Berg Church was built just west of the old church to replace the old church which fell into ruin afterwards. The old medieval church was restored in the 1960s and it still stands and is still occasionally used. This new 1878 building served the parish for quite some time. By the 1970s, the "new" church was in need of renovations and updates. There were some things fixed, but soon after, the need and desire emerged for a new, larger building closer to Helgeroa, were more of the population lived. The new church was designed by Reidar Aasen. The new building was consecrated on 28 January 2007. After the new building was completed, it took over the majority of the functions of the parish church, although the 1878 Berg Church is still in use by the parish. There is no cemetery at this church, so all burials still take place at the other Berg Church.

== See also ==
- List of churches in Tunsberg
