= Bjørnøy (Larvik) =

Island in Vestfold, Norway

Bjørnøya
- Interactive map of the island

Geography
- Location: Vestfold, Norway
- Coordinates: 59.11448°N 9.93553°E

Administration
- Norway
- County: Vestfold
- Municipality: Larvik Municipality

Bjørnøya is an island in Larvik Municipality in Vestfold county, Norway. The 1.9-square-kilometre (0.73 sq mi) island lies within the large lake Farris. It is the largest island on the lake. It is located just east of the village of Kjose. The island's highest peak, in the center of the island, rises to the altitude of 149 metres (489 ft). A few other peaks on the island have a height of over 100 metres (330 ft). The village of Bjørnøya is the only settlement on the island. The village is located on the southwestern shore of the island.

== See also ==
- List of islands of Norway
