= Bjørg Holmsen =

Norwegian politician (1931–2015)

Bjørg Holmsen, née Gulvik (13 June 1931 – 4 January 2015) was a Norwegian politician for the Conservative Party.

She was a deputy representative to the Parliament of Norway from Vestfold during the term 1973–1977. She met during 7 days of parliamentary session. She was also the mayor of Brunlanes Municipality from 1976 to 1987.
