= Kjose Church =

Church in Vestfold, Norway

- Kjose kirke
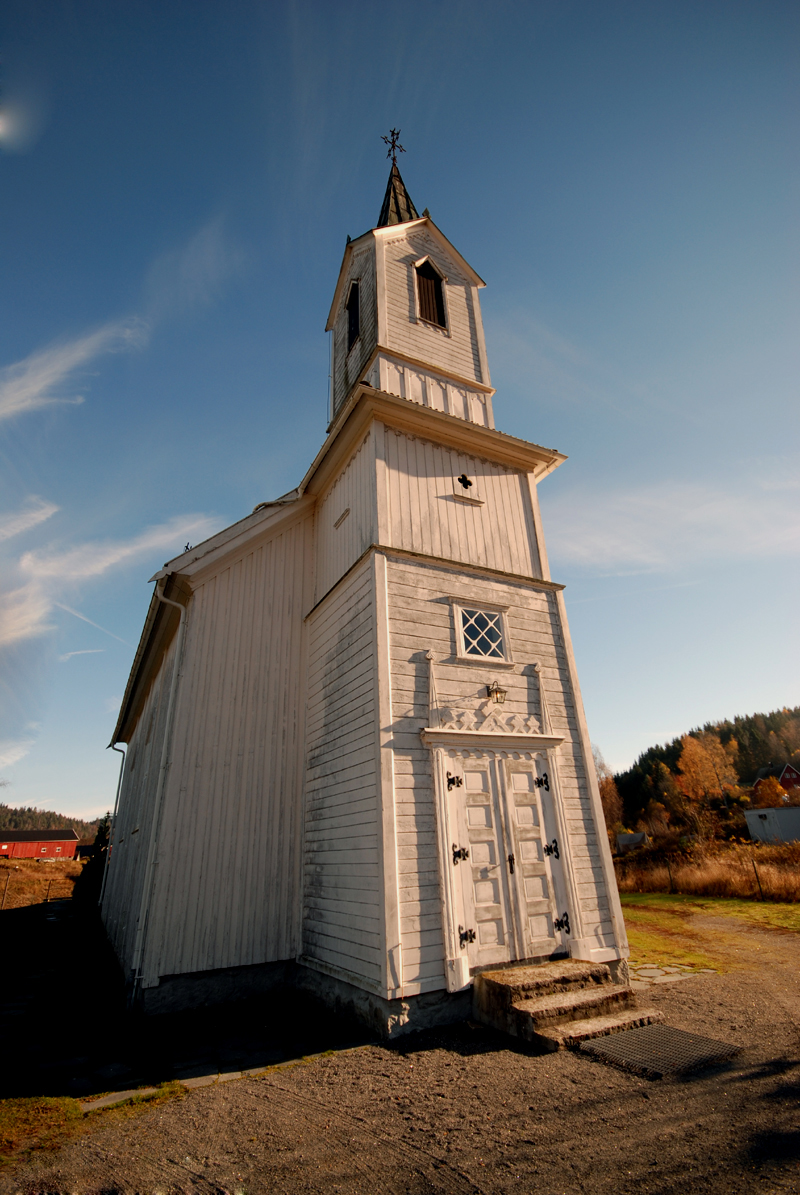
- View of the church
- Kjose Church
- 59°06′28″N 9°55′03″E
- Location: Larvik Municipality, Vestfold
- Country: Norway
- Denomination: Church of Norway
- Previous denomination: Catholic Church
- Churchmanship: Evangelical Lutheran

History
- Status: Parish church
- Founded: 13th century

Architecture
- Functional status: Active
- Architect: Gustav Adolph Lammers
- Architectural type: Long church
- Style: Neo-Gothic
- Completed: 1850 (176 years ago)

Specifications
- Capacity: 170
- Materials: Wood

Administration
- Diocese: Tunsberg
- Deanery: Larvik prosti
- Parish: Kjose
- Norwegian Cultural Heritage Site
- Type: Church
- Status: Automatically protected
- ID: 84787

Kjose Church (Norwegian: Kjose kirke) is a parish church of the Church of Norway in Larvik Municipality in Vestfold county, Norway. It is located in the village of Kjose, near the shore of the lake Farris. It is the church for the Kjose parish which is part of the Larvik prosti (deanery) in the Diocese of Tunsberg. The white, wooden church was built in a long church design in 1850 using plans drawn up by the architect Gustav Adolph Lammers. The church seats about 170 people.

== History ==
The earliest existing historical records of the church date back to the year 1372, but the church was not built that year. The first church in Kjose was likely a wooden stave church that may have been built during the 1200s. It was likely built on a site just north of the present church. Around the year 1606, the old church was torn down and replaced with a new log construction church building on the same foundation as the original church. The new building had a nave and chancel, but no tower. The church bells were simply hung in the attic. The building had a main entrance and church porch on the west end. There was one window of each wall of the nave. In 1626, the church porch was replaced along with several repairs to the building.

By the mid-1800s, the old church was in need of repairs and it was too small for the parish. Planning began for a new church to be built next to the old church. The new building was designed by Gustav Adolph Lammers. The new church was built during the summer of 1850 with Anders Tollefsen Bonnegolt and Mikkel Tangane as builders. The new church was consecrated on 8 August 1850. The new building was a small, neo-Gothic, long church was built using log construction with external wood paneled siding. The church has a west tower with a church porch beneath it. There is a rectangular nave with a chancel on the east end. Initially there was no sacristy but there was a small separate area in the chancel for the priest to use. In 1911, a sacristy extension was built on the east end of the choir. In 1977 an addition off the east end of the sacristy was built containing a kitchen and bathroom.

== See also ==
- List of churches in Tunsberg
