= Farris (mineral water) =

Norwegian brand of mineral water

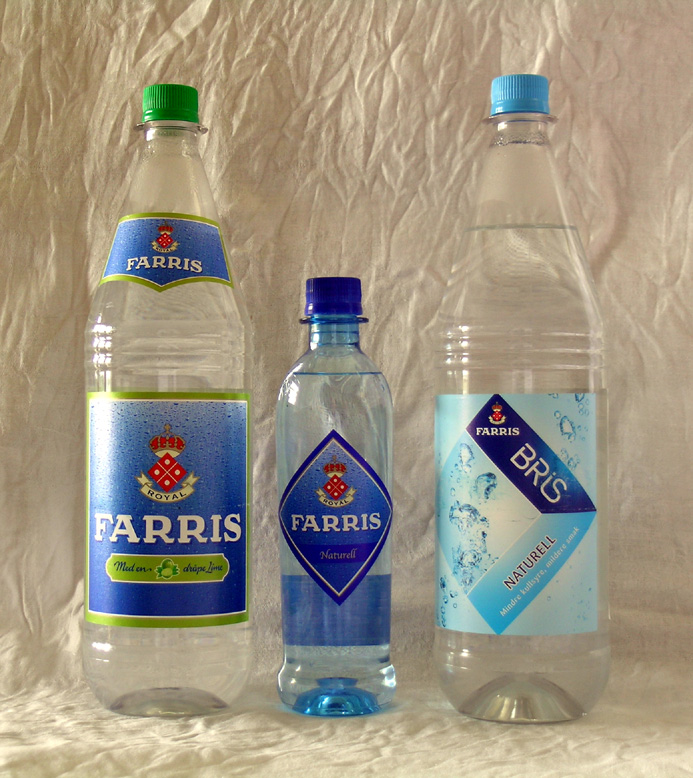
- Country: Norway
- Source: Kong Olav V kilde, Larvik
- Type: sparkling
- Calcium (Ca): 28
- Chloride (Cl): 667
- Bicarbonate (HCO_{3}): 300
- Magnesium (Mg): 31
- Potassium (K): 16
- Silica (SiO_{2}): 6
- Sodium (Na): 455
- Sulfate (SO_{4}): 11
- TDS: 1400
- Website: http://www.farris.no
- All concentrations in milligrams per liter (mg/L); pH without units

Farris is a brand of mineral water produced in Larvik Municipality. It is Norway's oldest and best-selling bottled water. It has been mentioned in literature as having positive health effects.

== History ==
=== 19th century ===
The product originated as a spin-off from the Spas in Vestfold when Mineral cures became popular in Norway in the second half of the 19th century. In 1875 Dr. J.C.Holm, a doctor and health resort pioneer, discovered a spring rich with minerals close to the river Farriselva. This led to the establishing of Larvik Bad (originally Laurvig Bad) in 1880, a mineral spa resort where one of the treatments offered was drinking mineralized water. Larvik Bad became very popular and had a capacity of 300 guests: Among the guests were Norwegian author and Nobel laureate Bjørnstjerne Bjørnson.

=== 20th century ===
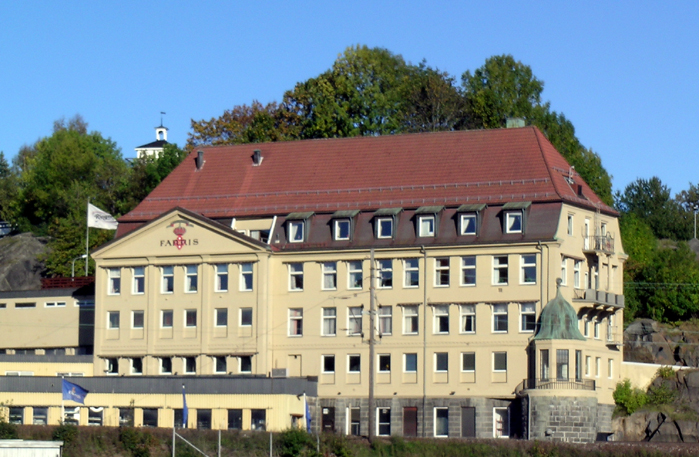
The Farris factory in Larvik. Built 1912-1915. Architects: Christian Morgenstierne and Arne Eide.

In cooperation with Larvik Bad the local brewery Vestfold bryggeri started bottling mineral water under the brandname of "Salus". Bottling commenced on August 16, 1907, making it the oldest brand of mineral water in Norway. In 1912 a new factory was initiated, by the architects Christian Morgenstierne and Arne Eide. It was expanded in 1915, the same year that the production was moved to the new site. The building was expanded again in 1980, and is still the bottling facility for Farris. Also in 1915, the brand name was altered to "Farris". According to Thomson Financial, "Farris has come to symbolise ‘Norwegian sparkling mineral water’, appears to have a virtual stranglehold on this sector with other local brands simply too small to warrant any strongly promotional activities to try to break this stranglehold." It holds a market percentage of 71% in Norway.

Although a common misconception has it that the water comes from lake Farris, the spring and Farris bottling company are located at the bottom of Bøkeskogen. Bøkeskogen is a forested hilltop which (along with the city of Larvik to the south of the hill) separates between Farris and the Skagerrak. Farris mineral water originates from rainwater falling on this hill. The water slowly filters through deposited glacial moraine material and reaches the spring some 15–20 years later, strongly mineralized. In 1988 a new spring, 21 metres (69 ft) deep, was discovered, and this new spring is the present source of the mineral water.

Since the first spring was discovered in 1875, it has been indicated to treat gout, among others. J.C.Holm recommended it as a cure for such various diseases as rheumatism, kidney stone and catarrh. The poet Robert Herring also claimed that Farris rids the body's arteries of uric acid.

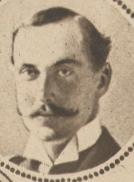
The original spring was named after King Haakon VII of Norway.

Farris have been connected to the Norwegian royal family in several ways. The original spring was, by permission from the royal court, named after king Haakon VII as Kong Haakons kilde and a twin spring from the same source likewise named after queen Maud. The new source discovered in 1988 is named Kong Olav Vs kilde after Olav V of Norway. Farris was one of very few brands that held a Royal Warrant while such still existed in Norway. There is still an agreement between Farris and the Royal Court that Farris should be freely delivered to the king wherever he may be. During the German occupation of Norway in World War II, Farris was prohibited from using the name Kong Haakons kilde in marketing as these was seen as propaganda for the exiled king.

=== 21st century ===
Ringnes breweries own the rights to the Farris trademark. The products under the Farris brand are sparkling mineral water which also comes with various flavours. The annual production volume is about 40,000,000 litres (8,800,000 imp gal; 11,000,000 US gal).

The new blue glass bottle (0.33l) that was launched in 2001 won the Norwegian Design Councils "Honours Award for Design Excellence".
