= Tanum Church (Vestfold) =

Church in Vestfold, Norway

- Tanum kirke
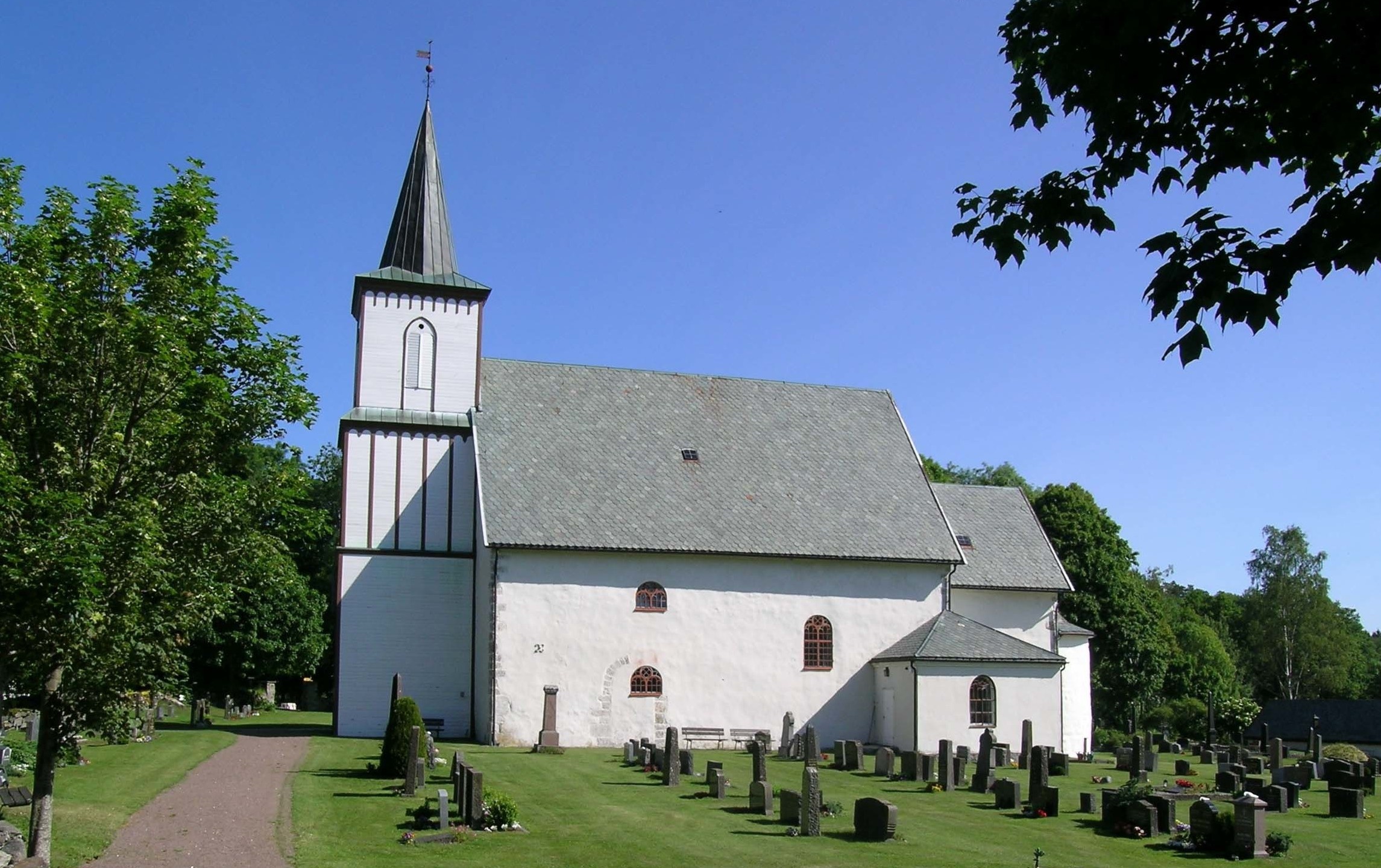
- View of the church
- Tanum Church
- 59°01′27″N 9°58′11″E
- Location: Larvik Municipality, Vestfold
- Country: Norway
- Denomination: Church of Norway
- Previous denomination: Catholic Church
- Churchmanship: Evangelical Lutheran

History
- Status: Parish church
- Founded: c. 1100
- Consecrated: c. 1100

Architecture
- Functional status: Active
- Architectural type: Long church
- Style: Romanesque
- Completed: c. 1100 (926 years ago)

Specifications
- Capacity: 240
- Materials: Stone

Administration
- Diocese: Tunsberg
- Deanery: Larvik prosti
- Parish: Tanum
- Norwegian Cultural Heritage Site
- Type: Church
- Status: Automatically protected
- ID: 85609

Tanum Church (Norwegian: Tanum kirke) is a parish church of the Church of Norway in Larvik Municipality in Vestfold county, Norway. It is located in the village of Tanum. It is the church for the Tanum parish which is part of the Larvik prosti (deanery) in the Diocese of Tunsberg. The white, wooden church was built in a long church design around the year 1100 using plans drawn up by an unknown architect. The church seats about 240 people.

== History ==
The earliest existing historical records of the church date back to the year 1315, but the church was not built that year. This church was likely built around the year 1100, and it may have been built on the site of an even older wooden stave church, but this has not been confirmed. The Romanesque stone church was originally dedicated to Saint Olav. Originally, the church was very simple, without a tower and with only one window - high up on the west gable. It included a rectangular nave, a smaller rectangular chancel and a curved apse. The main entrance was one the south wall (this was since closed, but traces of where it was are evident to this day). In addition, there was a smaller entrance in the west as well as an entrance in the south wall of the choir (this door now leads to a sacristy which was built later). In the late 1600s, windows were installed on the south side of the nave.

In 1814, this church served as an election church (Norwegian: valgkirke). Together with more than 300 other parish churches across Norway, it was a polling station for elections to the 1814 Norwegian Constituent Assembly which wrote the Constitution of Norway. This was Norway's first national elections. Each church parish was a constituency that elected people called "electors" who later met together in each county to elect the representatives for the assembly that was to meet at Eidsvoll Manor later that year.

In 1849–1850 there was a major renovation of the church. The present bell tower and church porch on the west end of the nave was built. This became the new main entrance. The old main entrance on the south side of the nave was bricked up and a window installed in its place. The church got a new altar as well and the old altarpiece was replaced with a simple wooden cross. In 1886, the old medieval wooden sacristy was replaced with a new stone one on the south side of the chancel. In 1899, the church received a new altarpiece painted by Eilif Peterssen. In 1910-1911, an extensive restoration and renovation took place under the direction of the architect Haldor Larsen Børve. There were many changes including the demolition and new construction of the second floor seating gallery and the replacement of Peterssen's altarpiece so that the window in the end wall could be properly fitted. In 1923, the chancel window received a stained glass design made by Per Vigeland under the guidance of his father Emanuel Vigeland.

== Media gallery ==
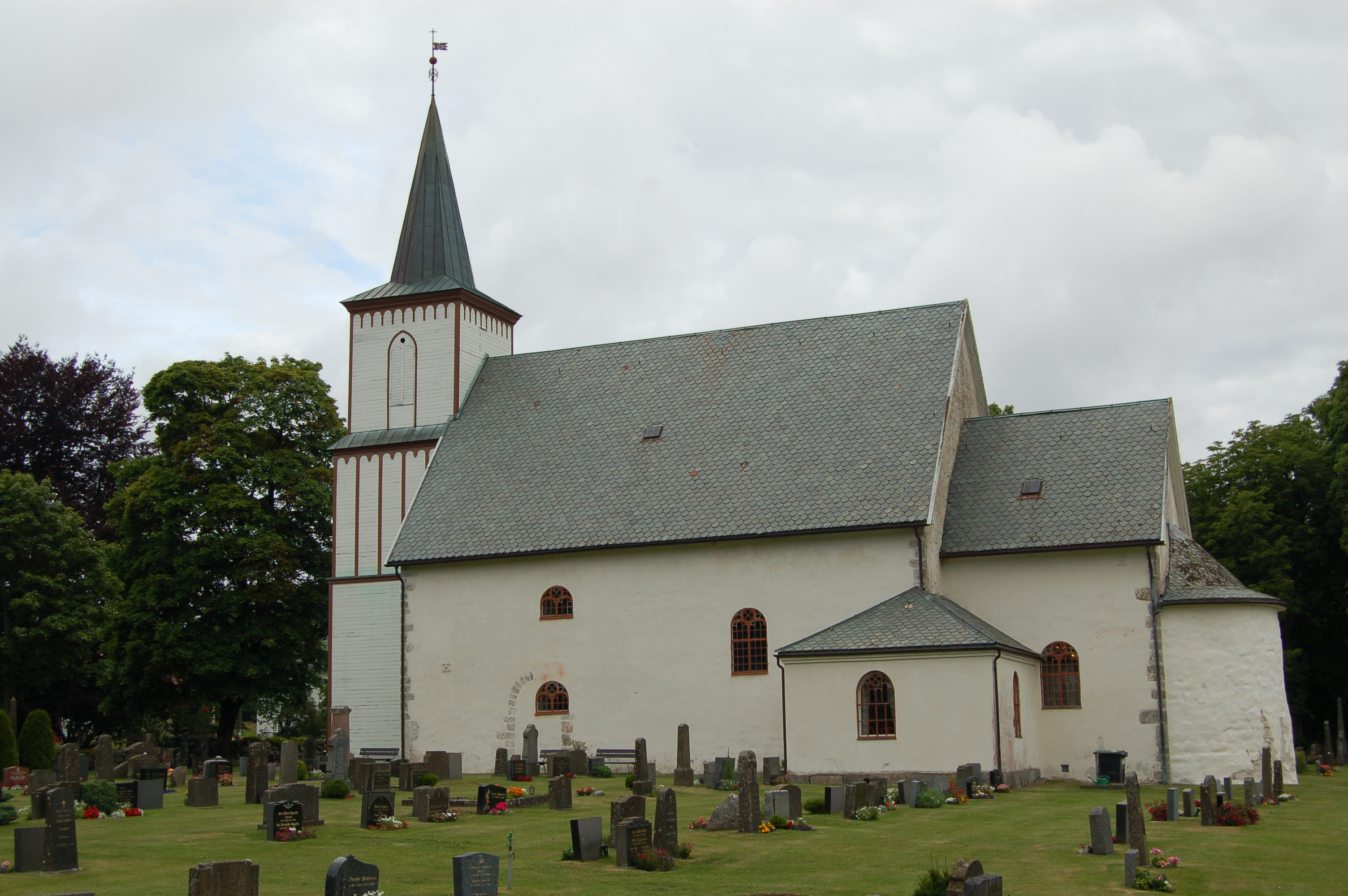

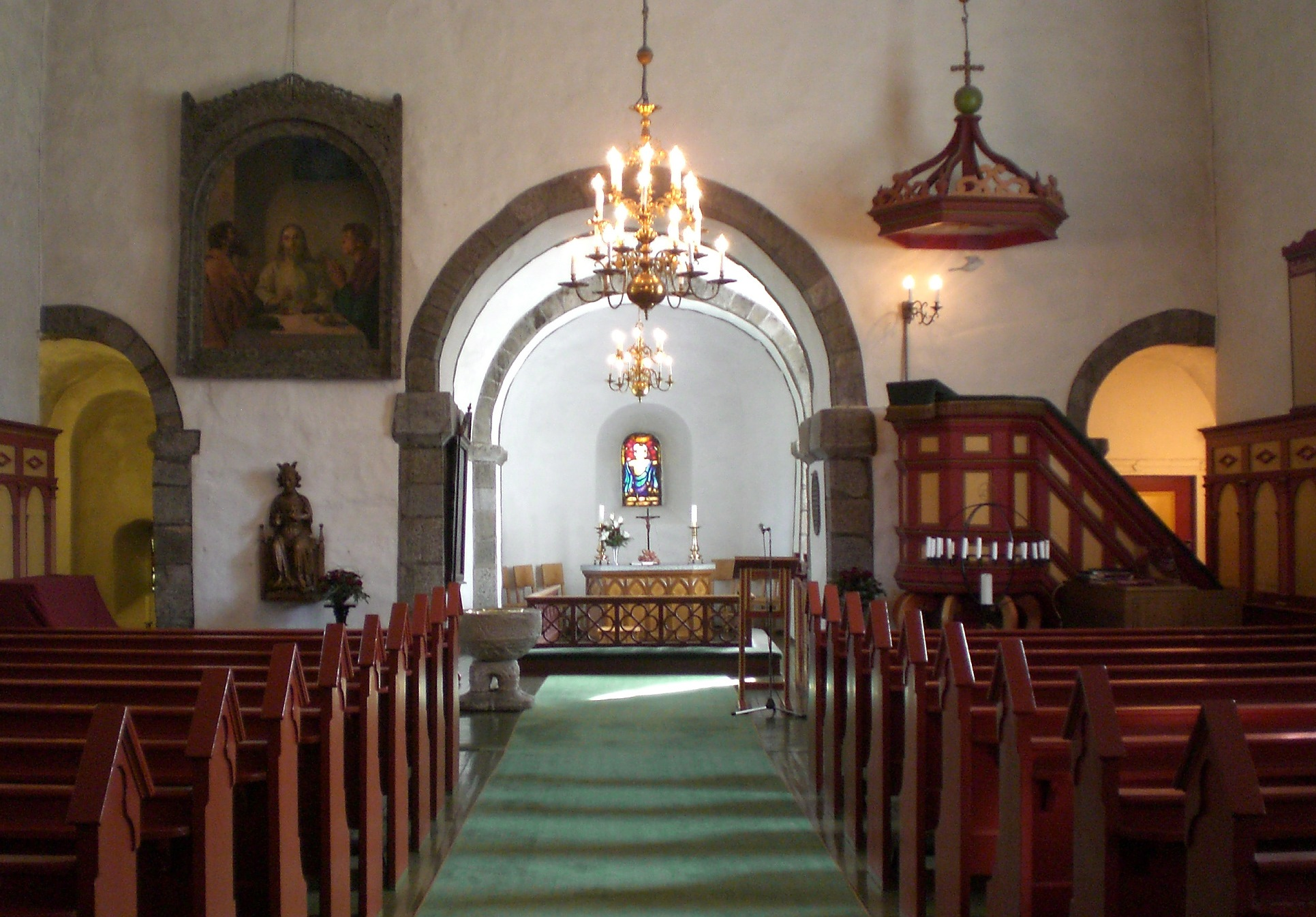

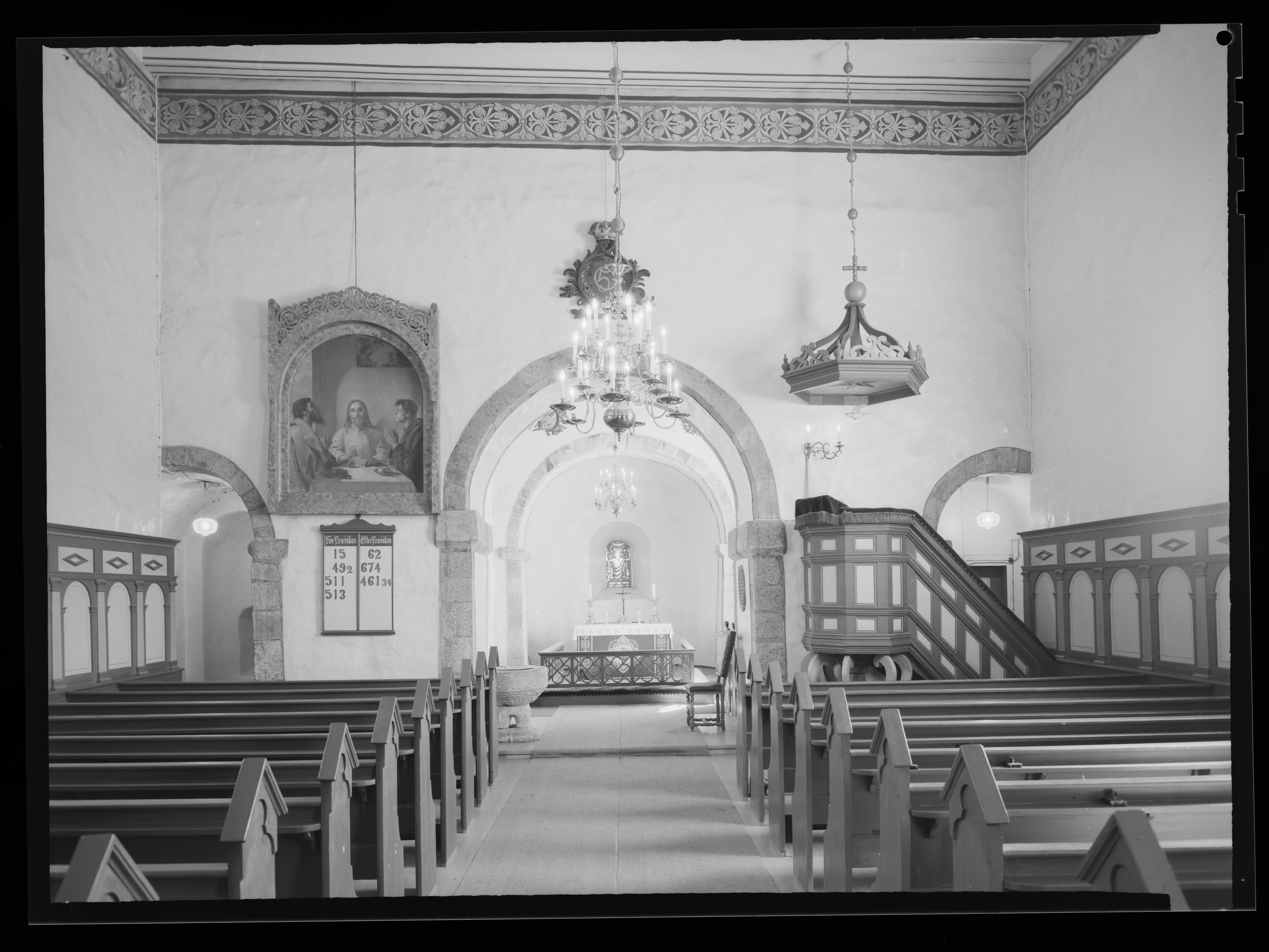

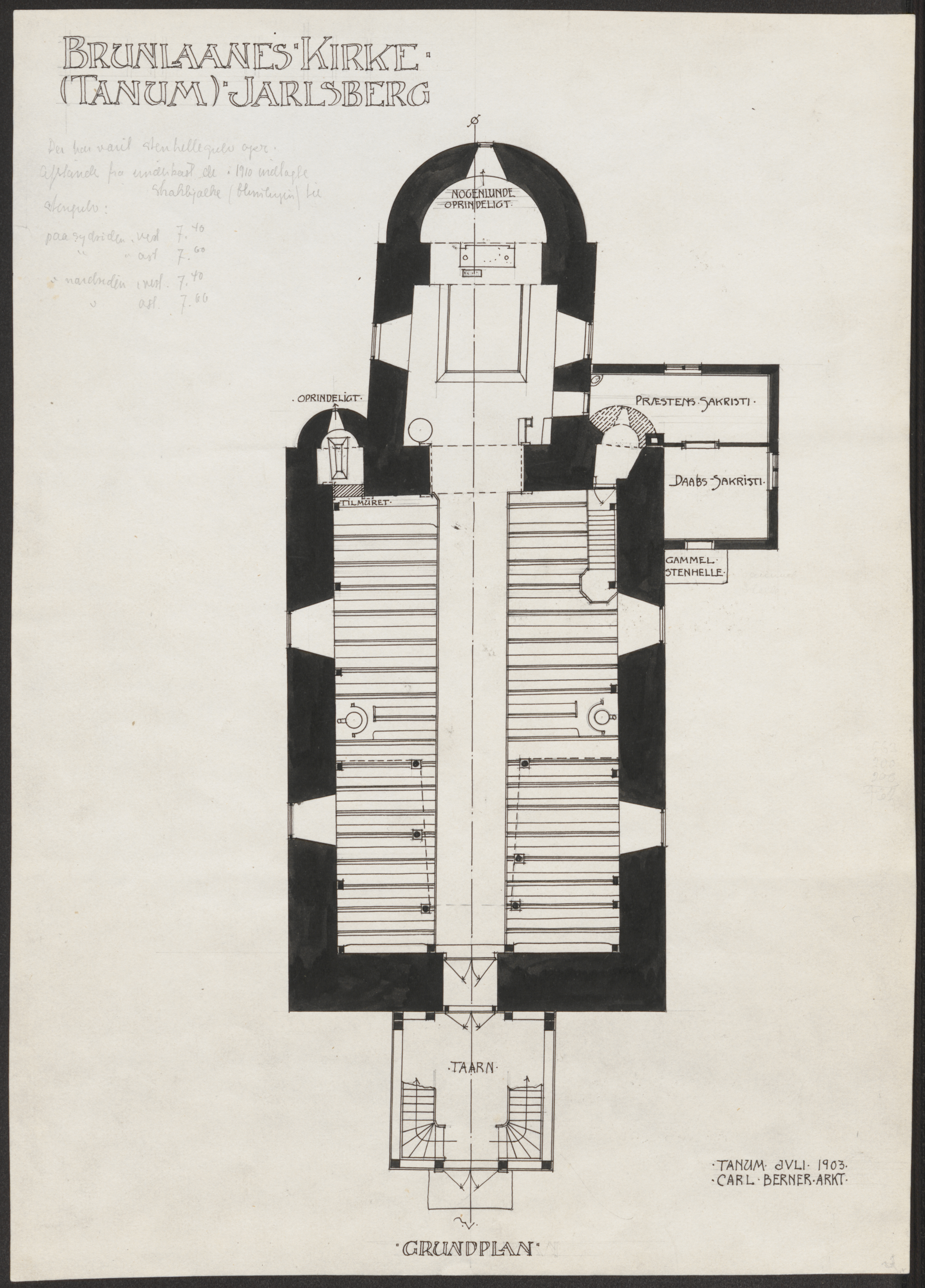

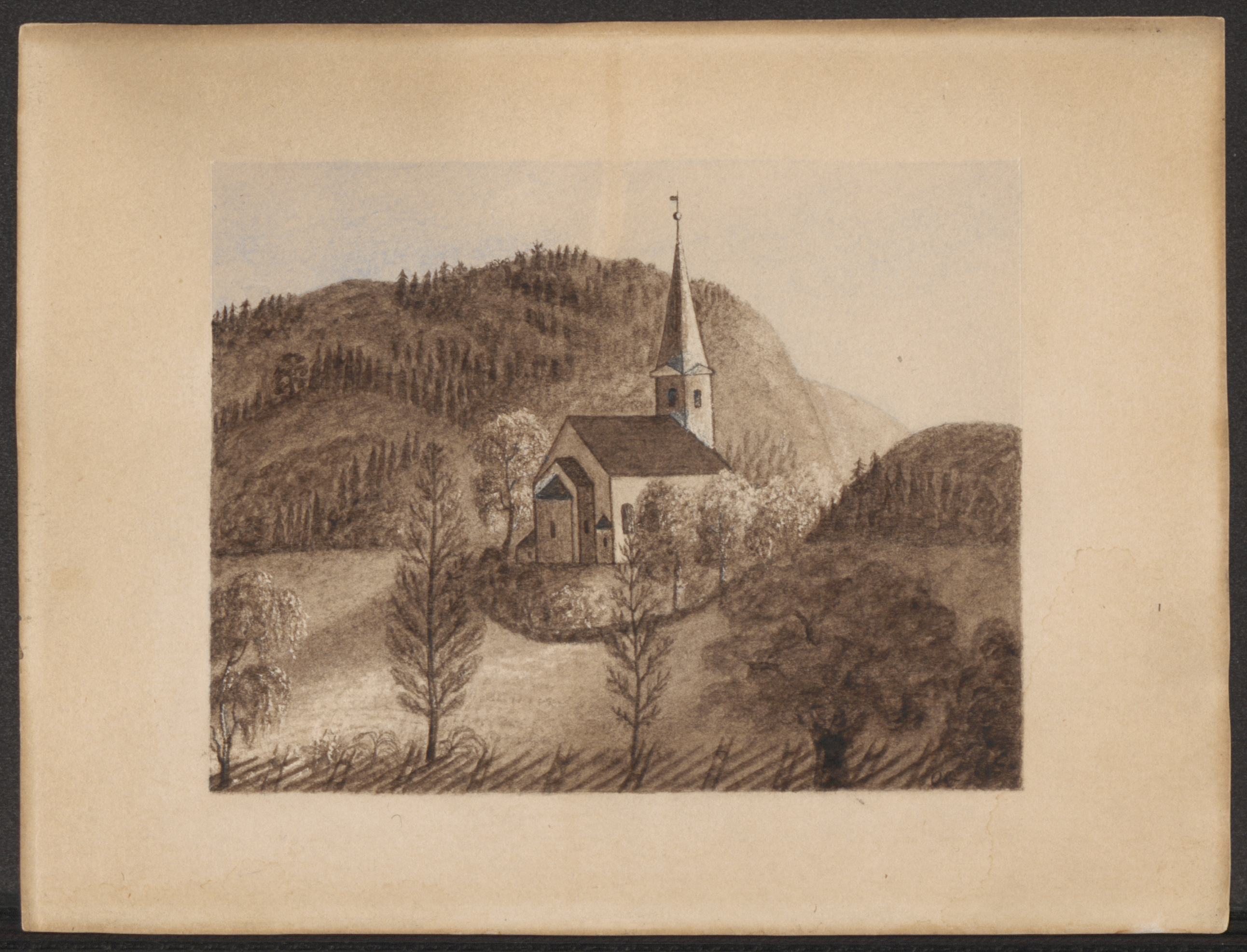

== See also ==
- List of churches in Tunsberg
