= Berg Church (Vestfold) =

Church in Vestfold, Norway

- Berg kirke
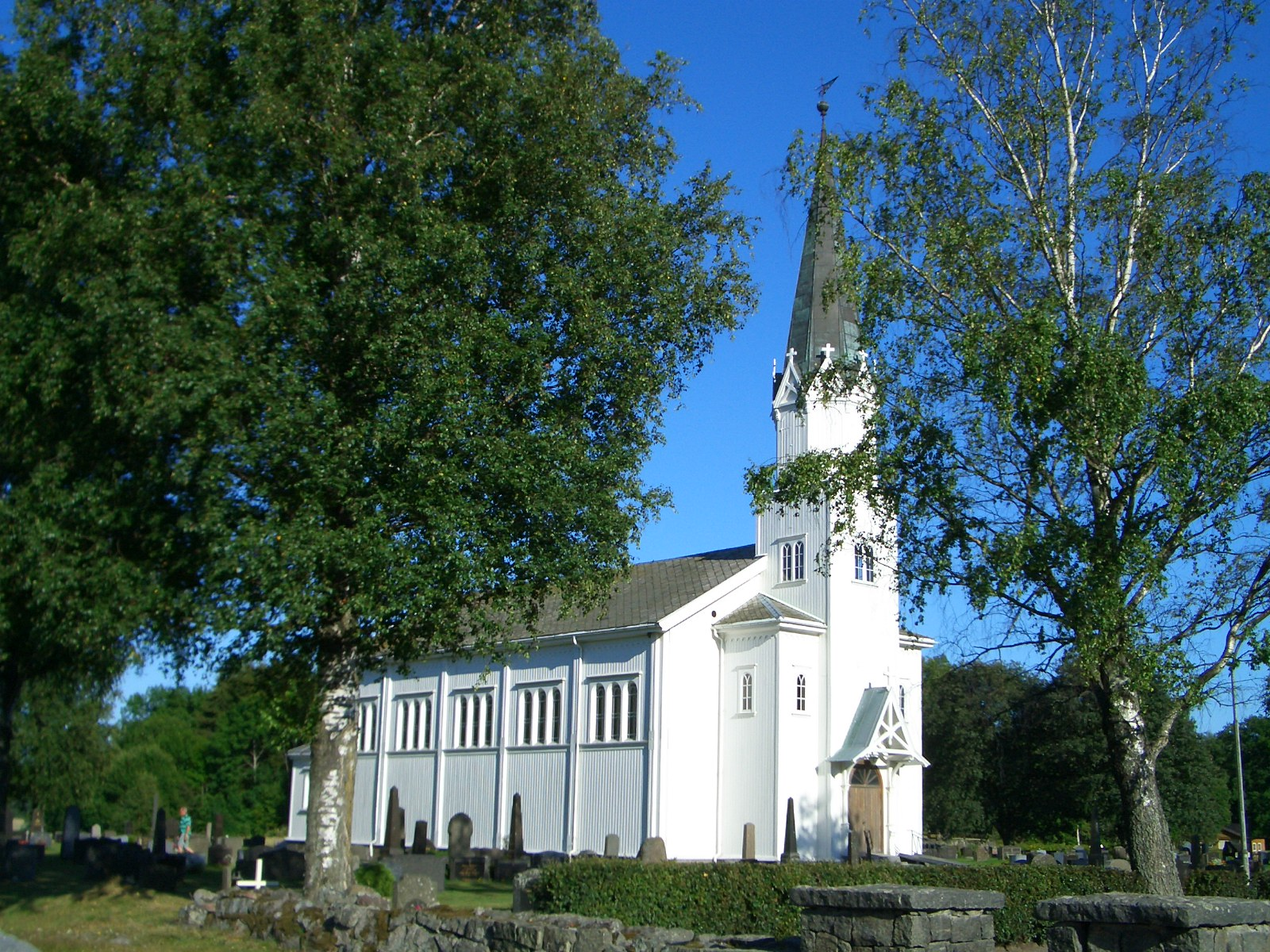
- View of the church
- Berg Church
- 58°59′28″N 9°54′55″E
- Location: Larvik Municipality, Vestfold
- Country: Norway
- Denomination: Church of Norway
- Churchmanship: Evangelical Lutheran

History
- Status: Parish church
- Founded: 1878
- Consecrated: 1878

Architecture
- Functional status: Active
- Architect: J.H. Nissen
- Architectural type: Long church
- Completed: 1878 (148 years ago)

Specifications
- Capacity: 305
- Materials: Wood

Administration
- Diocese: Tunsberg
- Deanery: Larvik prosti
- Parish: Berg
- Norwegian Cultural Heritage Site
- Type: Church
- Status: Listed
- ID: 83874

Berg Church (Norwegian: Berg kirke or Berg trekirke) is a parish church of the Church of Norway in Larvik Municipality in Vestfold county, Norway. It is located in the village of Berg. It is one of the churches for the Berg parish which is part of the Larvik prosti (deanery) in the Diocese of Tunsberg. The white, wooden church was built in a long church design in 1878 using plans drawn up by the architect J.H. Nissen. The church seats about 305 people.

== History ==
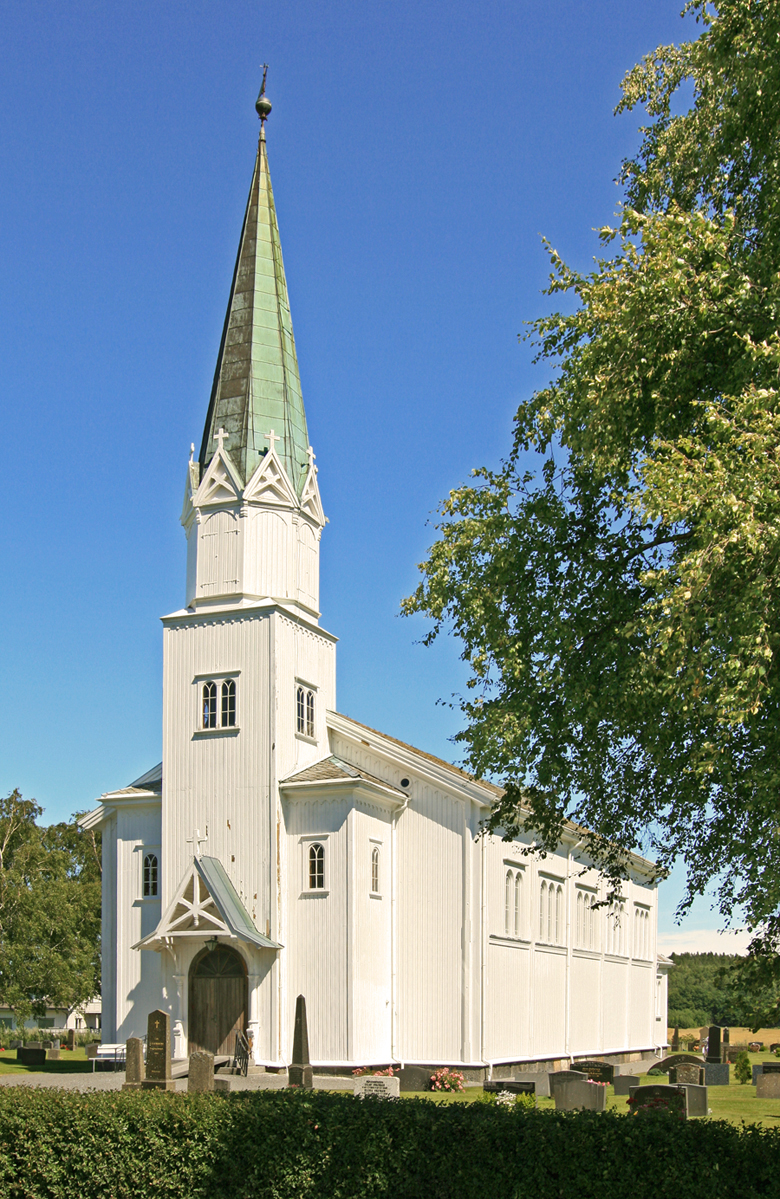
View of the church

By the late-1800s, the Old Berg Church was deemed to be too small and old and so the parish decided to build a new church. The new wooden long church was built about 300 metres (980 ft) to the southwest of the old church. The old church was closed and fell into ruin, but in the 1960s it was restored for historical purposes and the old church is now often called Berg steinkirke (lit. 'Berg stone church') and the new church is often called Berg trekirke (lit. 'Berg wooden church').

The new wooden church was designed by Henrik Nissen and it was built under the leadership of master builder Mathias Olsen. Construction began in 1875 and the new building was completed and consecrated in 1878. The building has a rectangular nave and a smaller chancel on the east end. There are small sacristies on the north and south side of the chancel.

In 2007, the new Berg Arbeidskirke was built about 3 kilometres (1.9 mi) to the southwest in Helgeroa. That new church has largely replaced this church as the main church for the parish. There is no cemetery at the new Berg Arbeidskirke, so burials and funerals still take place at this church which has a large cemetery surrounding the building.

== See also ==
- List of churches in Tunsberg
