= Farris =

Lake in Vestfold, Norway

- Farrisvannet
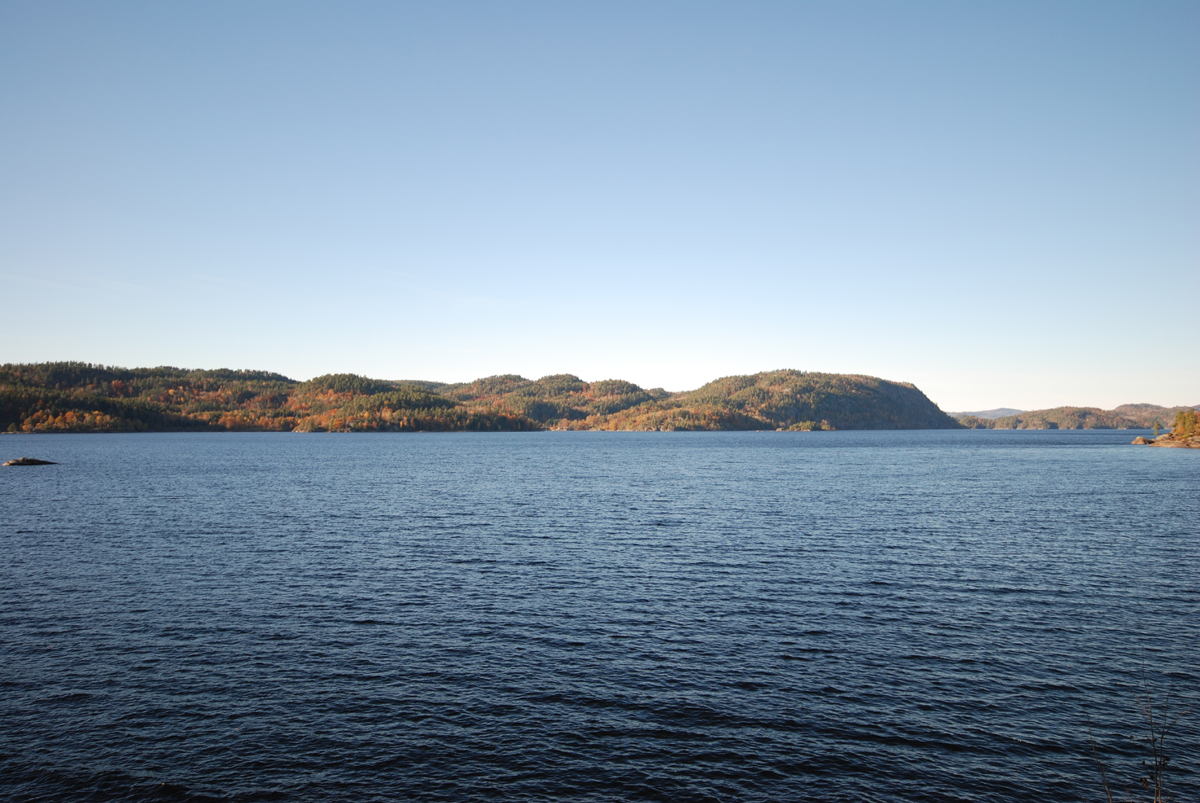
- View of the lake from the Gopledal vannverk
- Interactive map of Farris
- Location: Telemark and Vestfold
- Coordinates: 59.1488258°N 9.902801°E
- Type: Moraine-dammed lake
- Catchment area: 491 km^{2} (190 sq mi)
- Basin countries: Norway
- Max. length: 20 kilometres (12 mi)
- Max. width: 3.5 kilometres (2.2 mi)
- Surface area: 21.14 km^{2} (8.16 sq mi)
- Average depth: 35 m (115 ft)
- Max. depth: 131 m (430 ft)
- Water volume: 0.74 km^{3} (0.18 cu mi)
- Shore length^{1}: 107 kilometres (66 mi)
- Surface elevation: 20–23 metres (66–75 ft)
- Islands: Bjørnøya
- References: NVE
- ^{1} Shore length is not a well-defined measure.

Farris is a lake on the border of Telemark and Vestfold counties in Norway. The 20-kilometre (12 mi) long freshwater moraine-dammed lake is located mostly in Larvik Municipality in Vestfold county, but the northwestern part of the lake is located in Siljan Municipality and Porsgrunn Municipality in Telemark county. The large town of Larvik is located at the southern end of the lake.

The 21-square-kilometre (8.1 sq mi) lake would have been part of the saltwater Larviksfjorden, had it not been dammed by an end moraine left by the latest ice age. That moraine is about 1 kilometre (0.62 mi) wide, separating the lake from the sea. There is a short river that runs through the moraine which drains the lake into the fjord. The lake Farris is a drinking water reservoir for about 170,000 people in the region.

The largest island in the lake is Bjørnøya, located just east of the village of Kjose. The mineral water brand Farris is named after the lake.

== See also ==
- List of lakes in Norway
