= Kjose =

Village in Larvik, Norway

- Village
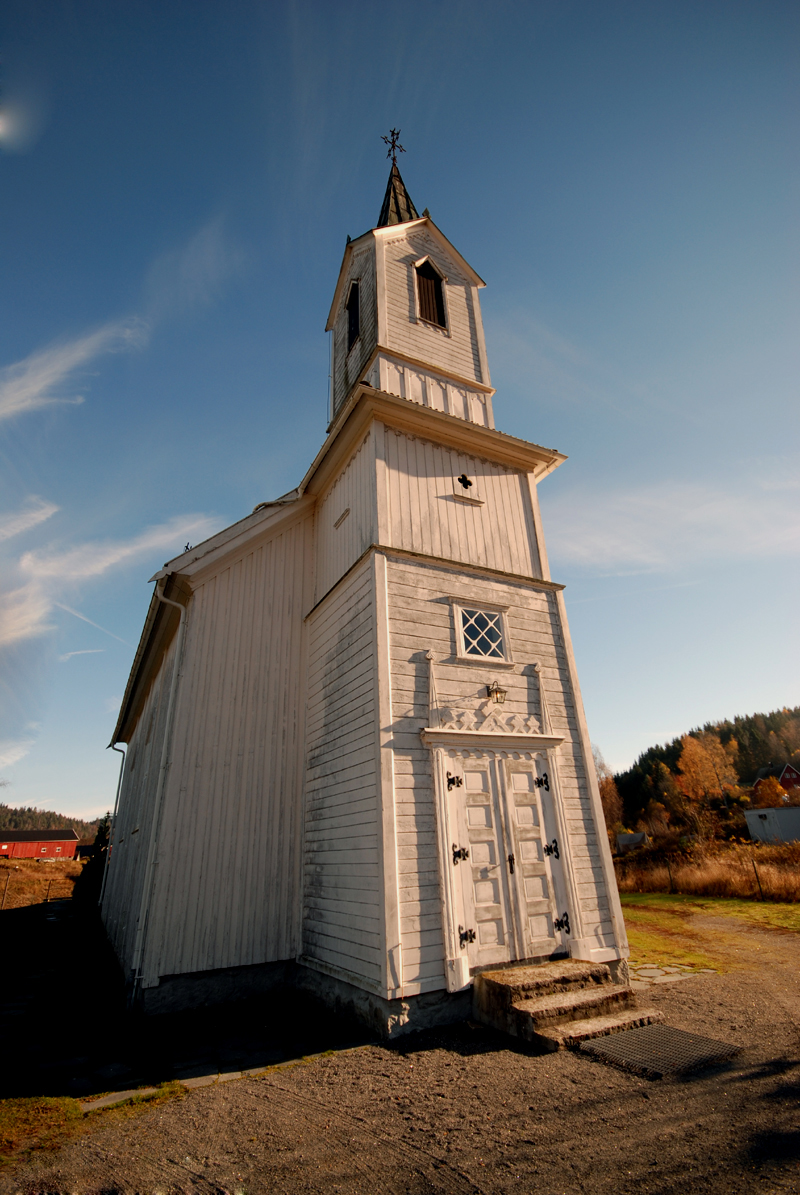
- View of the village church
- Interactive map of Kjose
- Coordinates: 59.10683°N 9.91952°E
- Country: Norway
- Region: Eastern Norway
- County: Vestfold
- District: Vestfold
- Municipality: Larvik Municipality
- Elevation: 42 m (138 ft)
- Time zone: UTC+01:00 (CET)
  - Summer (DST): UTC+02:00 (CEST)
- Post Code: 3268 Larvik

Kjose is a village in Larvik Municipality in Vestfold county, Norway. The village is on the western shore of the large lake Farris, about 10 kilometres (6.2 mi) to the northwest of the town of Larvik and about 20 kilometres (12 mi) east of the town of Porsgrunn. Kjose Church is located in the village.
