= Old Berg Church =

Church in Vestfold, Norway

- Berg gamle kirke
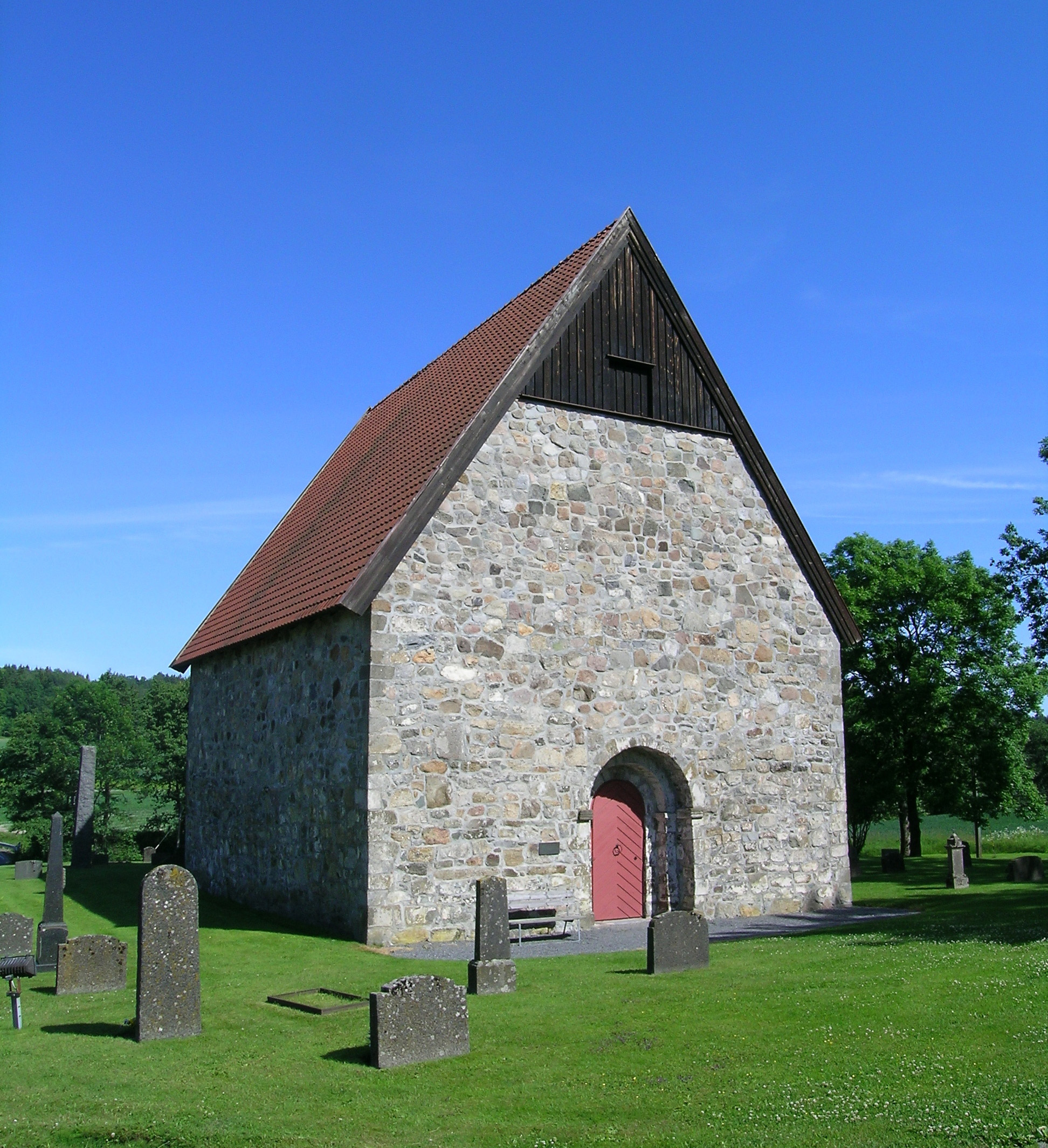
- View of the church
- Old Berg Church
- 58°59′34″N 9°55′08″E
- Location: Larvik Municipality, Vestfold
- Country: Norway
- Denomination: Church of Norway
- Previous denomination: Catholic Church
- Churchmanship: Evangelical Lutheran

History
- Status: Parish church
- Founded: c. 1100
- Consecrated: c. 1200

Architecture
- Functional status: Preserved, inactive
- Architectural type: Long church
- Style: Romanesque
- Completed: c. 1100 (926 years ago)
- Closed: 1878

Specifications
- Capacity: 122
- Materials: Stone

Administration
- Diocese: Tunsberg
- Deanery: Larvik prosti
- Parish: Berg
- Norwegian Cultural Heritage Site
- Type: Church
- Status: Automatically protected
- ID: 83872

Old Berg Church (Norwegian: Berg gamle kirke) is a historic parish church of the Church of Norway in Larvik Municipality in Vestfold county, Norway. It is located in the village of Berg. It is the former church for the Berg parish which is part of the Larvik prosti (deanery) in the Diocese of Tunsberg. Now, it is a preserved church that is occasionally used by the parish, but it has not been in regular use since 1878. The gray and brown stone church was built in a long church design around the year 1100 using plans drawn up by an unknown architect. The church seats about 122 people.

== History ==
The earliest existing historical records of the church date back to the year 1398, but the church was not built that year. The old church was likely built in the early 1100s in an Romanesque style of architecture. The church has a rectangular nave and narrower, rectangular choir with a lower roofline. The church was built with natural stones (none were cut to fit). There are three doors: two in the nave and one in the chancel. Originally there were no windows in the building, but there was a small skylight in the gable of the chancel. The church originally had an earthen floor covered with stones. The church is located about 50 metres (160 ft) from river Bergselva, which was close enough to the sea to allow some boats to travel from the sea, up the river, and to the church.

The church fell into disrepair after the Reformation, and the church's valuables were sent to Copenhagen. However, the church was restored in 1592. It was given a window, and the choir opening was made larger. A pulpit and benches were added, and the church was used as a parish church until the end of the 19th century, when it was deemed to be too small and was in poor condition. From 1875 to 1878, a new church was built just up the hill from this church. The new Berg Church was consecrated in 1878 as the new parish church. After this, the stone church went out of use and it fell into disrepair. The ruins remained there until 1911, when some of the stones were taken from the walls and brought to several local farms to be used there.

After many years as a ruin, it was decided that they old building should be restored for historical purposes. During the 1960s, restoration work began under the leadership of Finn Bryn. The newly restored building was re-consecrated on 13 September 1970. The church regained its old pulpit from 1592 as well as a couple of candlesticks from the same time. Above the chancel arch is a crucifix made by Joseph Grimeland, and to the left of the chancel arch there is a rune stone built into the wall. On the north wall hangs an epitaph about Dorthe Christensdatter and her family. During archaeological excavations in 1968, 324 coins were found at the church. Most have been sent to the coin collection at the Museum of Cultural History, Oslo, but a selection of the coins were put in a frame that hangs on the wall in the church. The church is not a regular parish church, but is used for a few worship services each year and is used for special occasions such as weddings and concerts.

== Media gallery ==
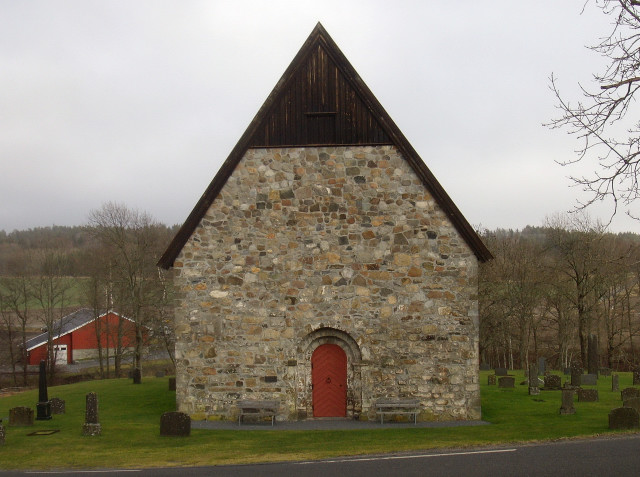

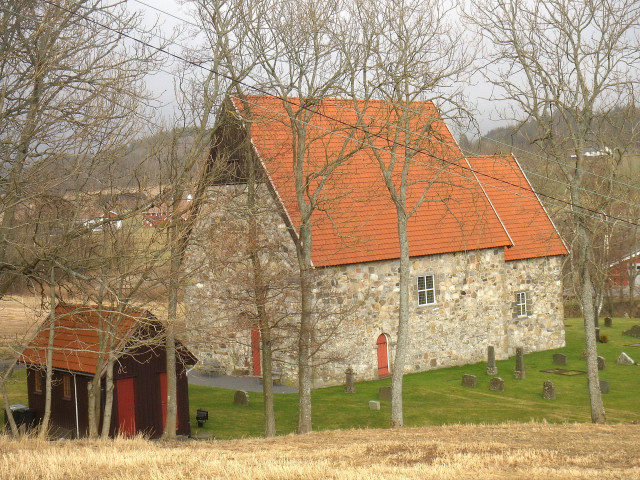

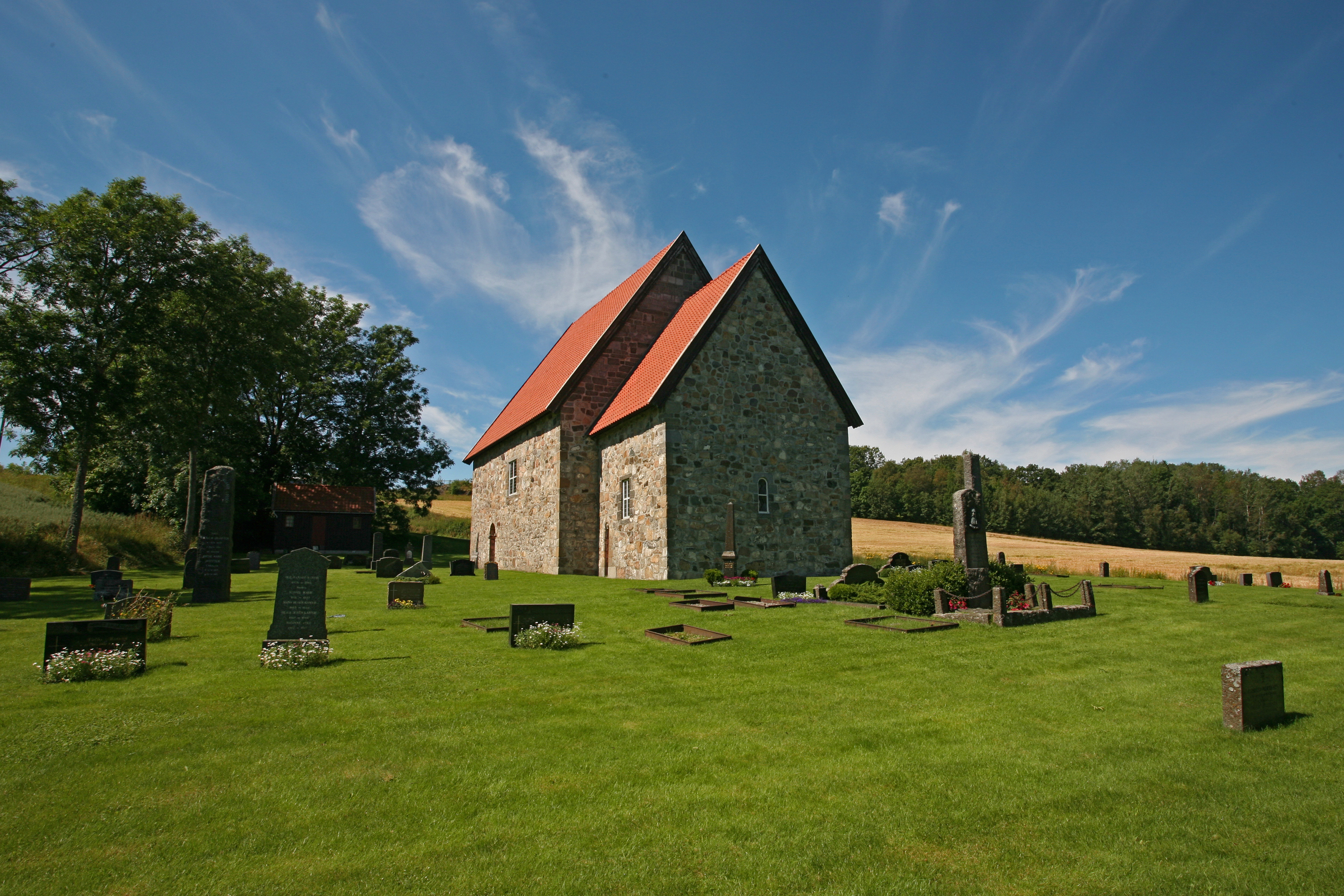

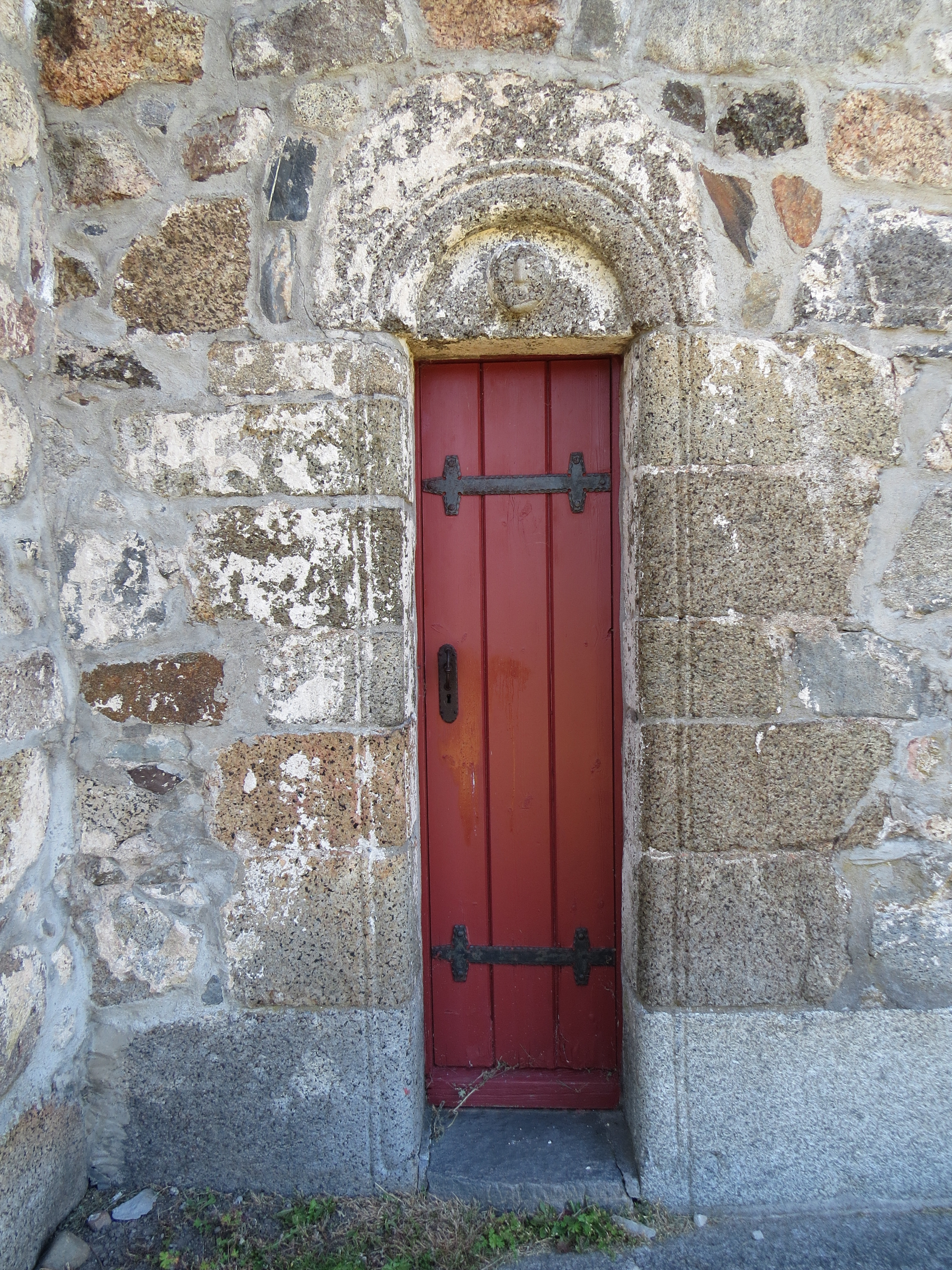

== See also ==
- List of churches in Tunsberg
