= Lorna McDonald =

Australian historian and author

Lorna McDonald OAM
- Born: Lorna Lorraine Bucknall; 10 August 1916; Portland, Victoria, Australia
- Died: 25 June 2017 (aged 100)
- Education: University of Queensland
- Spouse: Hugh McDonald (m. 1938; died 1981)
- Children: 3, including Roger
- Awards: Order of Australia, John Douglas Kerr Medal of Distinction
- Scientific career
- Fields: History
- Thesis: (1985)

Lorna Lorraine McDonald OAM (née Bucknall; 10 August 1916 – 25 June 2017) was an Australian historian and author.

== Early life ==
McDonald was born at Portland, Victoria in 1916 and attended school at Mount Gambier, South Australia.

She married Hugh Fraser McDonald (1909–81), a Presbyterian minister, at the Presbyterian Church in Drik Drik, Victoria in 1938. They had three sons Donal, Roger and Gavin, all born and educated in NSW. McDonald and her husband moved to Rockhampton, Queensland in 1963.

== Professional career ==
=== Academic achievements ===
Once McDonald moved to Rockhampton, she began studying externally, completing degrees from the University of Queensland.

In 1975, McDonald gained a master's degree after publishing a thesis on land settlement in the Port Curtis and Leichhardt districts of Queensland. Ten years later, McDonald received a PhD for her thesis on the history of the Central Queensland cattle industry.

In 2000, McDonald was awarded Doctor of Letters from Central Queensland University.

=== Writing ===
In 1981, McDonald released the first of more than twenty books which are all related to the history of Central Queensland with the first publication entitled Rockhampton: A history of city & district which explored in detail the history of the region.

McDonald's 2011 publication, Treasures in a Tea Tin was based on her discovery of an old tea tin that contained a collection of old letters, postcards, photos and artworks that were written to Joan Archer while she was away in England. McDonald found the tea tin in the 1990s while she was doing unrelated research about the Archer brothers.

After celebrating her 100th birthday in 2016, McDonald relaunched The Moving Mind: The life of Henry Arthur Kellow (1881–1935) a biography of Rockhampton Grammar School principal Henry Kellow, originally published in 1981. At the relaunch of the book, McDonald admitted she wasn't interested in writing another book, but was reading books about geology and biology as she liked to read things about subjects that she had not yet studied. Later examples of her research have been noted for factual inaccuracies, particularly in the second edition of her heritage walk publication, which contained discrepancies regarding the origins of the Majestic Cafe. McDonald attributed the establishment and legacy of the cafe to post-WWII Greek immigrants who she claimed replaced the previous operators in the 1950s. However, archival records from the Morning Bulletin between 1913 and 1954 demonstrate that the venue on East Street, located next to James Stewart & Co., was originally built and operated by the Wotley family. The premises initially opened as "Cafe Beautiful" on Tuesday, 27 March 1934, before being officially rebranded by the Wotleys as "Cafe Majestic" in 1937.

=== Criticism of Q150 shortlist ===
In 2009, McDonald openly questioned why various landmarks in Central Queensland had failed to be shortlisted for the "Queensland's Top 150 Icons" list, compiled as part of the Q150 sesquicentenary celebrations, after the Queensland Government invited the public to nominate their favourite Queensland landmarks for the list. McDonald said she was surprised that the Fitzroy River, Customs House and the Mount Morgan Mine didn't manage to secure a place amongst the other 300 landmarks that were shortlisted for the final Top 150 list.

== Bibliography ==
=== Author ===
- Rockhampton: A History of City & District (1981)
- Sketches of old Rockhampton (1981) (Illustrated by Edith Neish, Text by Lorna McDonald)
- Henry Arthur Kellow, 1881–1935 (1981)
- Cattle Country: The Beef Cattle Industry in Central Queensland, 1850s–1980s (1988)
- Gladstone: The city that waited (1988)
- A Proud Name: Rees R & Sydney Jones (1989)
- Great Traditions: St Andrew's Presbyterian Church, Rockhampton, 1861–1994 (1994)
- Rockhampton: A History of City & District (Second Edition) (1995)
- Magic Ships: Life Story of Colin Archer (1997)
- That's Sport! A History of the Frenchville Sports Club, 1948–1998 (1998)
- Delving into the Past: The Jubilee History of Rockhampton & District Historical Society, 1948–1998 (1998)
- Over Earth and Ocean: The Archers of Tolderodden and Gracemere – a Norse-Australian Saga, 1819–1965 (1999)
- West of Matilda: Life in Outback Queensland, 1890s to 1990s (2001)
- Capricornia Queensland: A heritage sketchbook (2001) (Illustrated by Edith Neish, Text by Lorna McDonald)
- Success Through Worthy Service: Anderson's City Printing Works, 1903–2003 (2003)
- Rockhampton's Heritage Walk: Take 10,000 Steps (2005)
- Tartan over Capricornia: Scottish Immigrants in Central Queensland (2006) (co-authored with Sue Smith)
- Treasures in a Tea Tin (2011)
- A Proud Name: Rees R & Sydney Jones (Second Edition) (2014) (co-authored with Robert Macfarlane)
- The Moving Mind: The Life of Henry Arthur Kellow, 1881–1935 (Second Edition) (2016)

=== Editor ===
- Letters of Australian pioneer family, 1827–1880; The Generation of Gittins and Sarah Bucknall, 1797–1880 (1984) Edited and Introduced by Graeme Bucknall and Lorna McDonald
- Sin, Sweat & Sorrow: The Making of Capricornia Queensland, 1840s–1940s (1993) Edited by Liz Huf, Lorna McDonald and David Myers
- Sin, Sweat & Sorrow: The Making of Capricornia Queensland, 1840s–1940s (Second Edition) (1999) Edited by Liz Huf, Lorna McDonald and David Myers

=== Oral projects ===
- Mary Bradford interview (1982)
- Sidney Robinson interview (1982)
- Hamish Spence interview (1982)
- Mona Collins interview (1982)
- Tom Collins interview (1983)
- William Power interview (1985)

== Lorna McDonald Collection ==
In 2013, McDonald donated 22 boxes to the Fryer Library at the University of Queensland, consisting of her collection of diaries, research notes, photographs and personal papers which she had accumulated during her research between 1963 and 2013.

== Recognition ==
In 1995, McDonald was awarded an Order of Australia medal. In 2007, McDonald was presented with the Royal Historical Society of Queensland's John Douglas Kerr Medal of Distinction. Since her death, McDonald's work in collecting, interpreting, and writing the history of the Central Queensland has been celebrated with the annual Arts Central Queensland Lorna McDonald Essay Prize.

== Death ==
McDonald died on 25 June 2017. Rockhampton mayor Margaret Strelow said that the city's councillors were very saddened at hearing the news of McDonald's death, and said the contribution she had made in both preserving and recording the history of Central Queensland will leave a legacy of which McDonald's family should be proud.
