= Tollerodden =

Peninsula in Larvik, Norway

Coordinates: 59.047°N 10.035°E

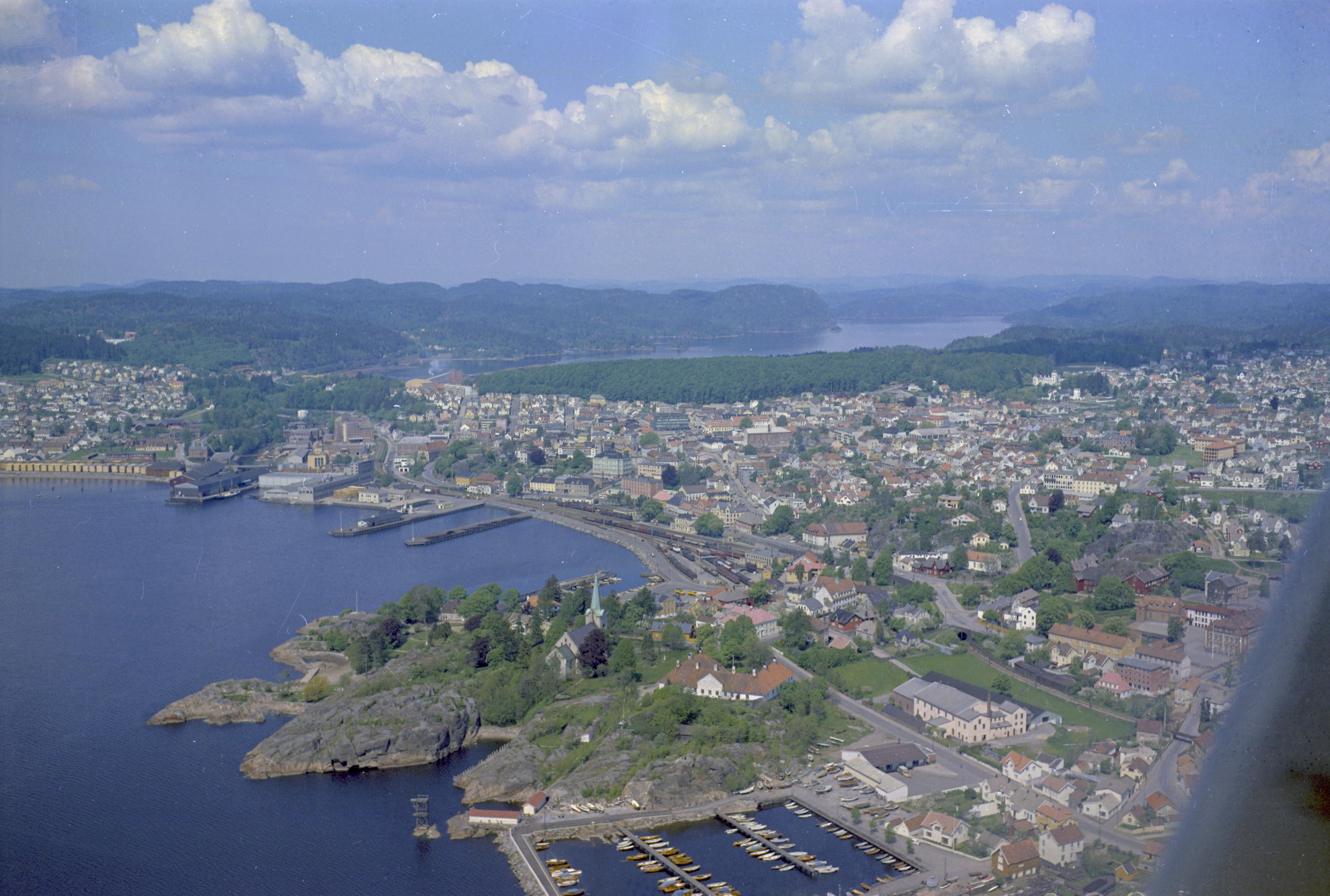
Larvik town with Tollerodden peninsula in the foreground, wooded with Larvik church clearly visible and the Customs/Archers house to the left. Photo taken c. 1964

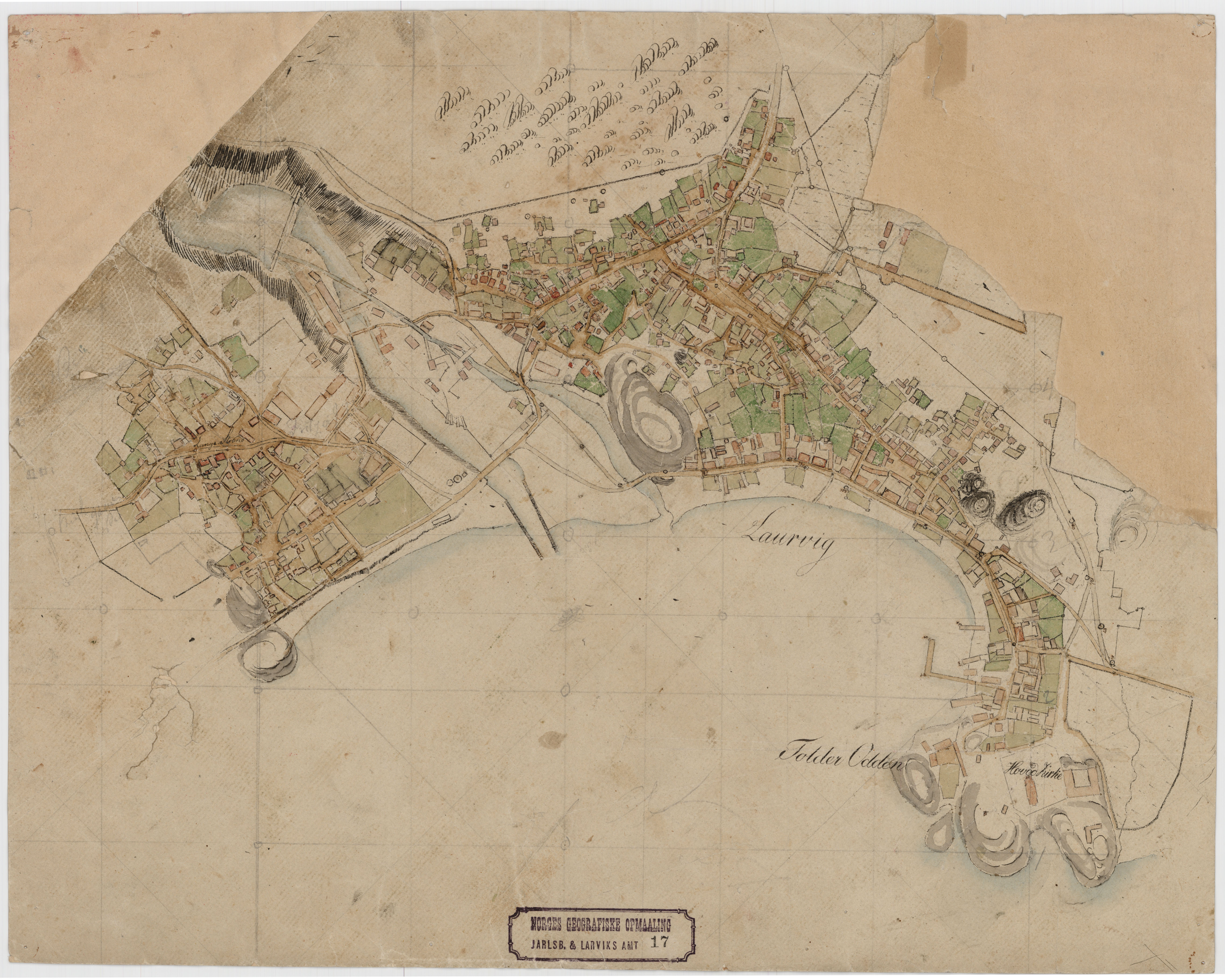
Map of Larvik (Laurvig) from 1813 with Tolderodden to the bottom right.

Tollerodden (spelled Tolderodden until 1917) is a small rocky promontory located at the head of the Larviksfjorden on the eastern side and a part of the town of Larvik in Larvik Municipality in Vestfold county, along the southeast coast of Norway.

The Larviksfjorden is open to the southeast, so Tollerodden was the safest place in Larvik harbour, thus the town was originally established at Tollerodden and the nearby surroundings. As the town of Larvik grew, the commercial harbour was moved further down the fjord to the south and Tollerodden became preserved to look like it was in the town's early years.

Tollerodden has become recognised worldwide as the birthplace of the naval architect Colin Archer, who had his boatyard here. He became renowned for his seaworthy pilot and rescue vessels and also the polar ship Fram.

== Early history ==
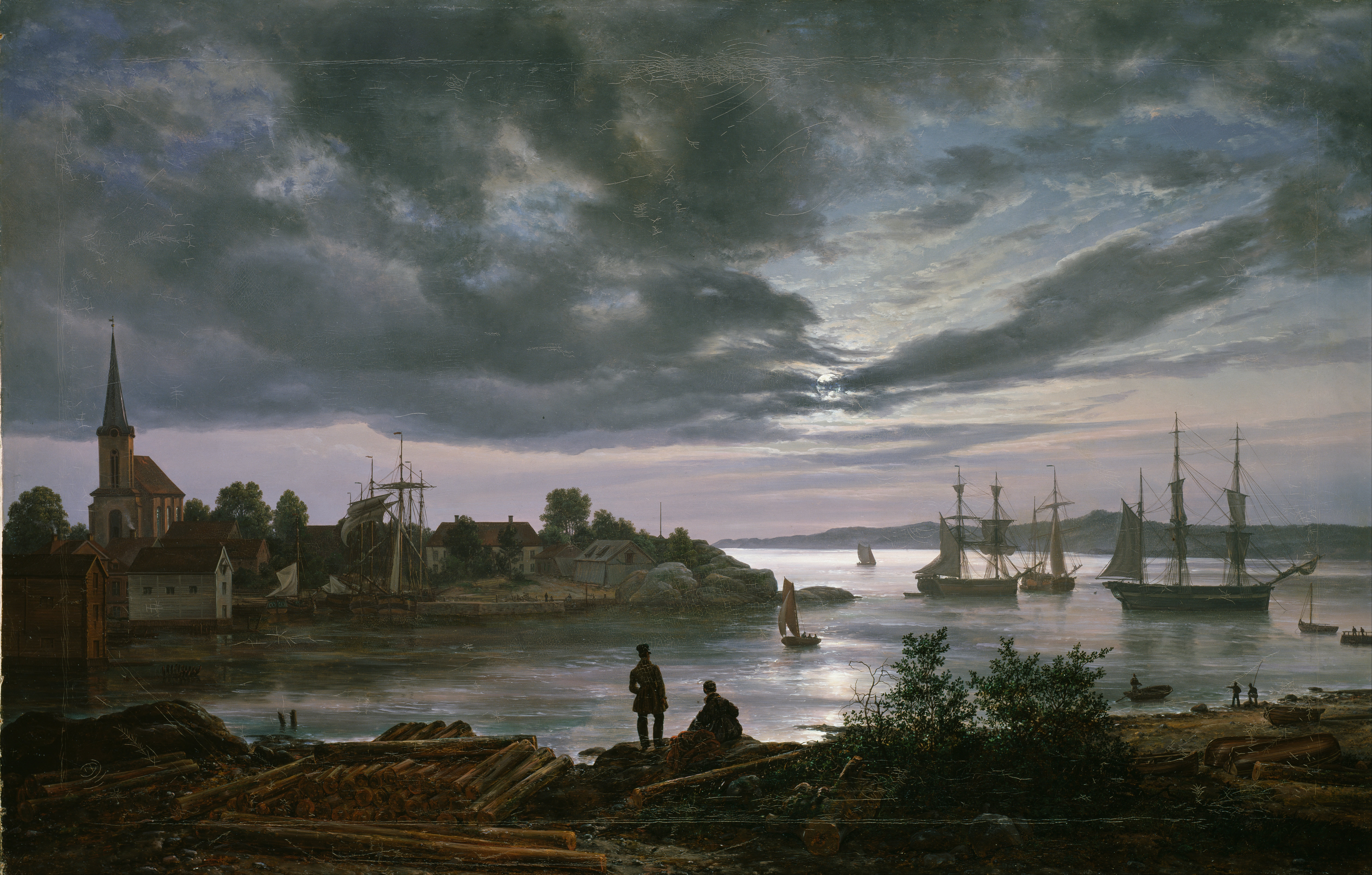
Tollerodden painted 1839 with the two story Customs house owned by timber merchant William Archer.

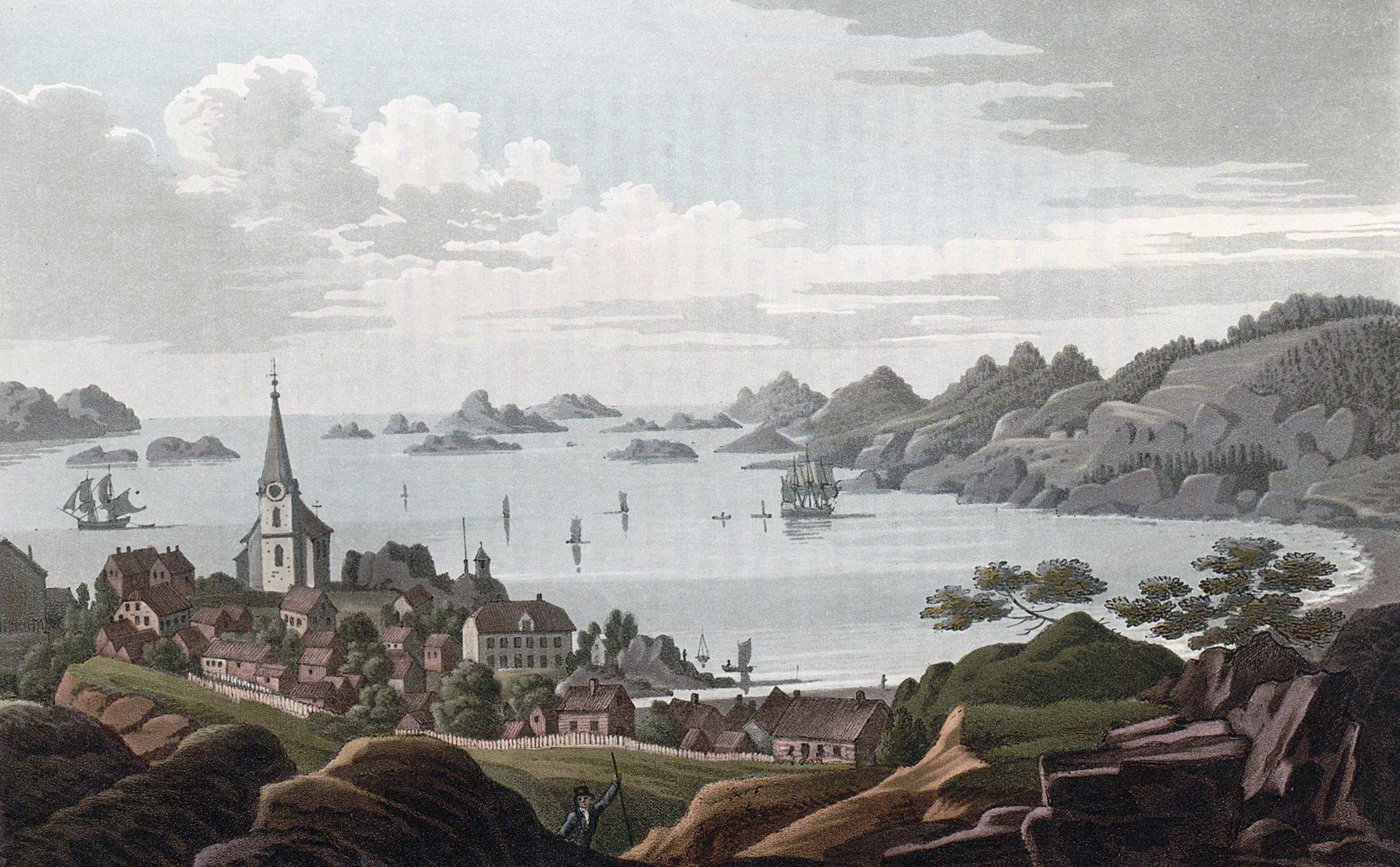
Tollerodden summer 1800. Customs house is the two story building clearly seen to the right of the church, centre left of the picture.

"Tollerodden" means "The Customs peninsula" because a Customs house was situated here. The name was spelt "Tolderodden" until 1917 when Norway had its second modernization of the language replacing Danish words and spelling to those closer to Norwegian dialects. "Tolder"/"toller" means the Customs officer and "odden" means point, headland, or peninsula.

By coincidence, Tollerodden was owned by Niels Toller in 1667-69 and it has been speculated that the name had been spelt with "ll" in early days, but there is no evidence of that, and it is more likely that the Customs house gave name to the peninsula.

=== The Customs house ===
In the 1660s Customs revenue grew significantly as Larvik town was expanding and the Customs officer became a wealthy man. The Customs account 1670-71 shows that a building was built, and it became so expensive that it was sold to the officer for a reduced price. It is not documented that this building was at Tollerodden, but timber from today's building, has been dated to have been cut 1667–1668. The location is central in the harbour, so it was a sensible place to have the customs office. From 1686 to 1789, four known customs officers lived there and the house served as the customs office.

In 1794, the building and large property owned by the Customs, was bought by a wealthy ship owner and merchant Hans Falkenberg. The house was extensively rebuilt and extended. The roof was angled more by lowering the edge so only ground floor had windows on the sides. At the east end an extension was added as a T-building. This is basically as the building is today. In 1820 it was sold to three ship owners.

== Larvik church ==
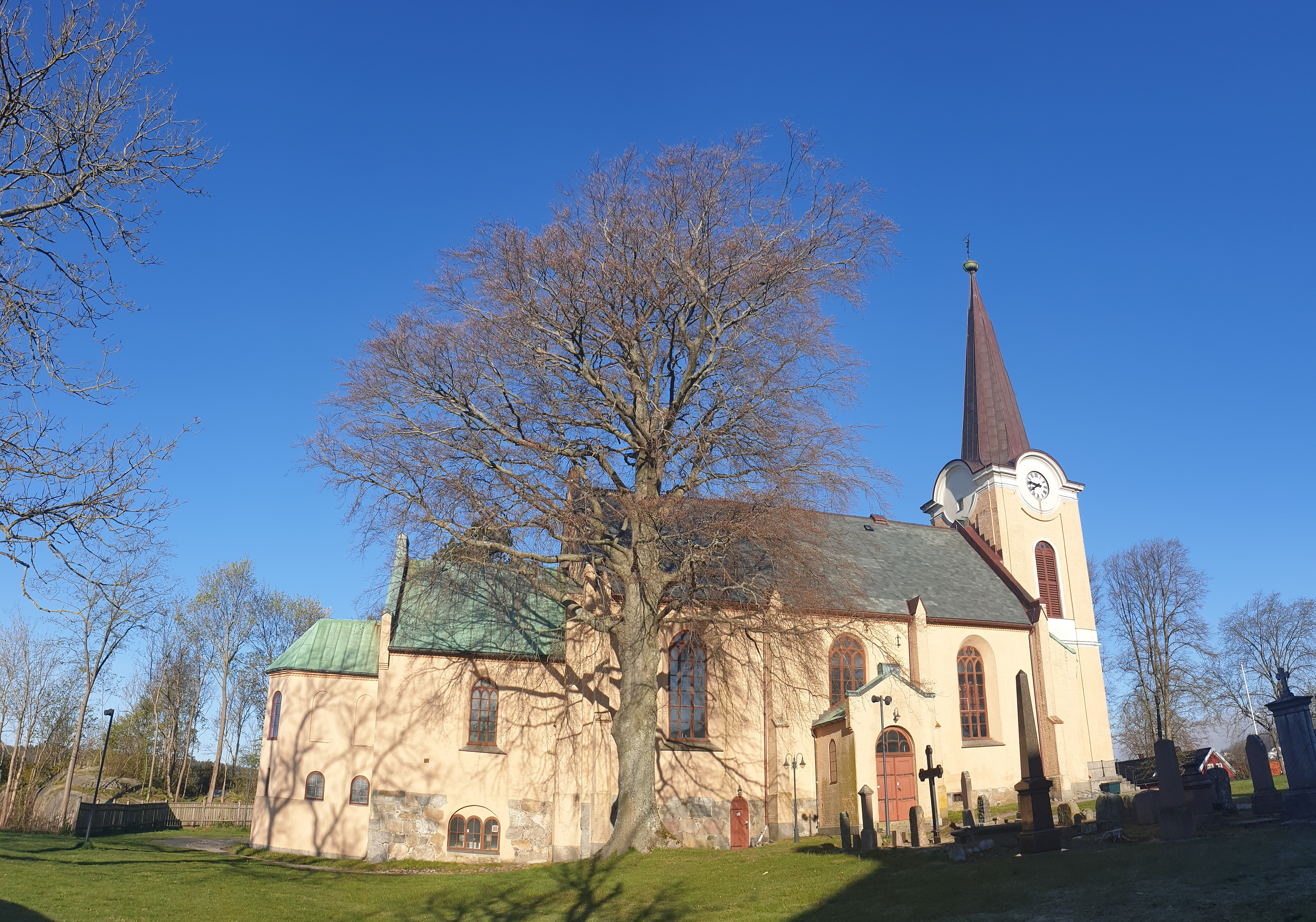
Larvik church 2020

Larvik Church is located at Tollerodden close to the Customs property. The church was given permission to build in 1668 and was finished in 1677, the tower was added in 1762.

== Laurvig Hospital ==
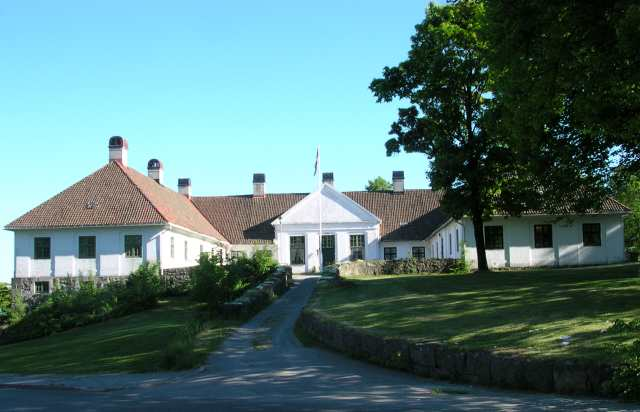
Laurvig Hospital

In 1736 Laurvig Hospital, a wooden building, was built next to the church. In 1760 it was replaced with a brick building which is today in its original shape. In the early 1800s, it served as a school and today it is run by a foundation as social lodgings. "Laurvig" is the old way of spelling "Larvik" and the spelling is kept for this building.

== Larvik Maritime museum ==
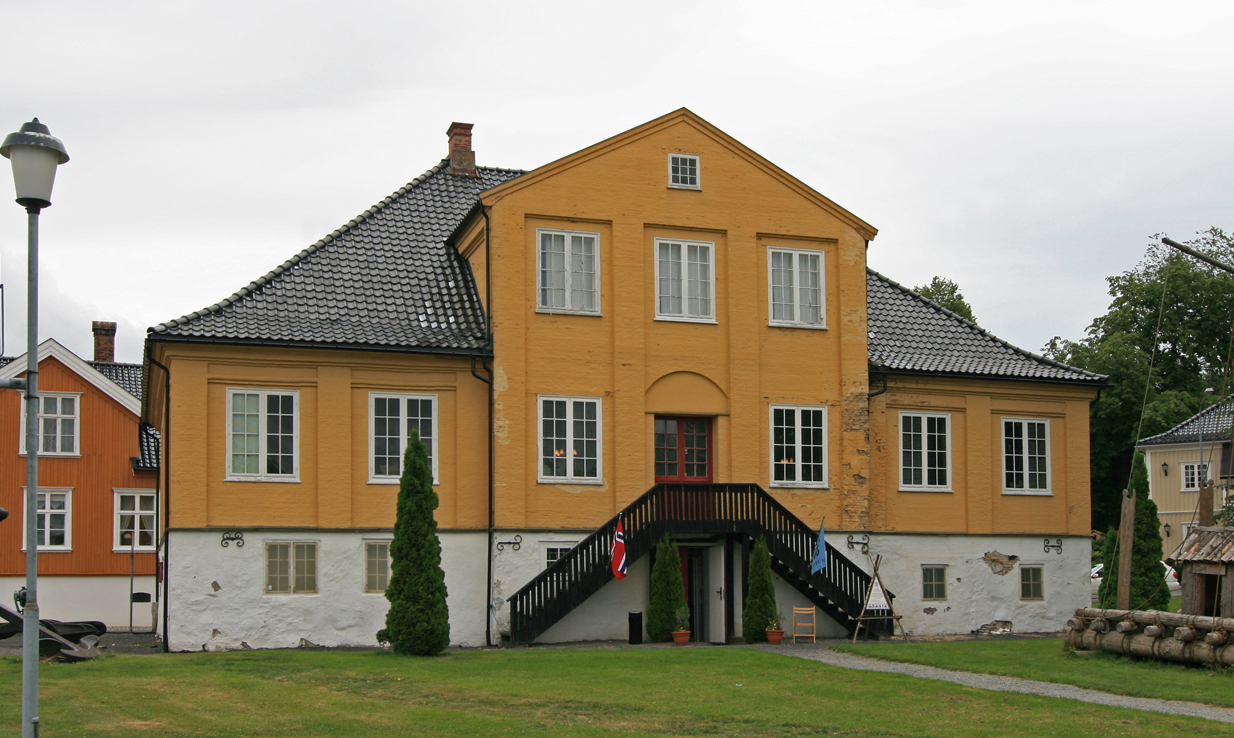
Larvik Sjøfartsmuseum (Larvik maritime museum)

The Larvik Maritime museum was built in 1714 as a brick building by a merchant. In 1728 it was severely damaged by fire and extensive repair and changes were done. The house had different uses during the years, but is still in the 1730 rebuilt shape. In 1850 the house became the Customs Office. Later, the building was used as a theatre, mineral water factory, knitwear factory and warehouse. In 1962 it became the maritime museum. The Maritime Museum is today it is a part of the Larvik Museum and is only open in the summer time. The Maritime museum has some of Archer's drawings, but most of them are at the museum in Oslo. Larvik does not have a permanent Archer exhibition, but there are plans for a new building for a Colin Archer-centre to house both the rescue boat Stavanger and the pilot boat Straaholmen.

== The breakwater harbour Skotta ==
In 1750, a wooden pier was built at Tollerodden. This pier was destroyed by storms several times, so it was decided to make a solid stone breakwater. This was started in 1770 but was intermittent and the pier was not finished until 1805. The breakwater was again damaged several times and several extensive repairs were done. By 1835, it had the shape it has today. Wooden boats are given priority in the habour.

== Shipyard at Tollerodden until 1813 ==
There was a small shipyard on the town side of Tollerodden, just west of where Colin Archer later had his yard. The ship owner Falkenberg, owner of Tollerodden (previously Customs house) from 1794, ran the shipyard and the last ship built, was the three masted bark Prima, built for himself in 1813.

== Archer family ==
Tollerodden has become recognised worldwide as the birthplace of the naval architect Colin Archer, whose ancestors came from Scotland.

=== Scottish Archer family moves to Tollerodden ===
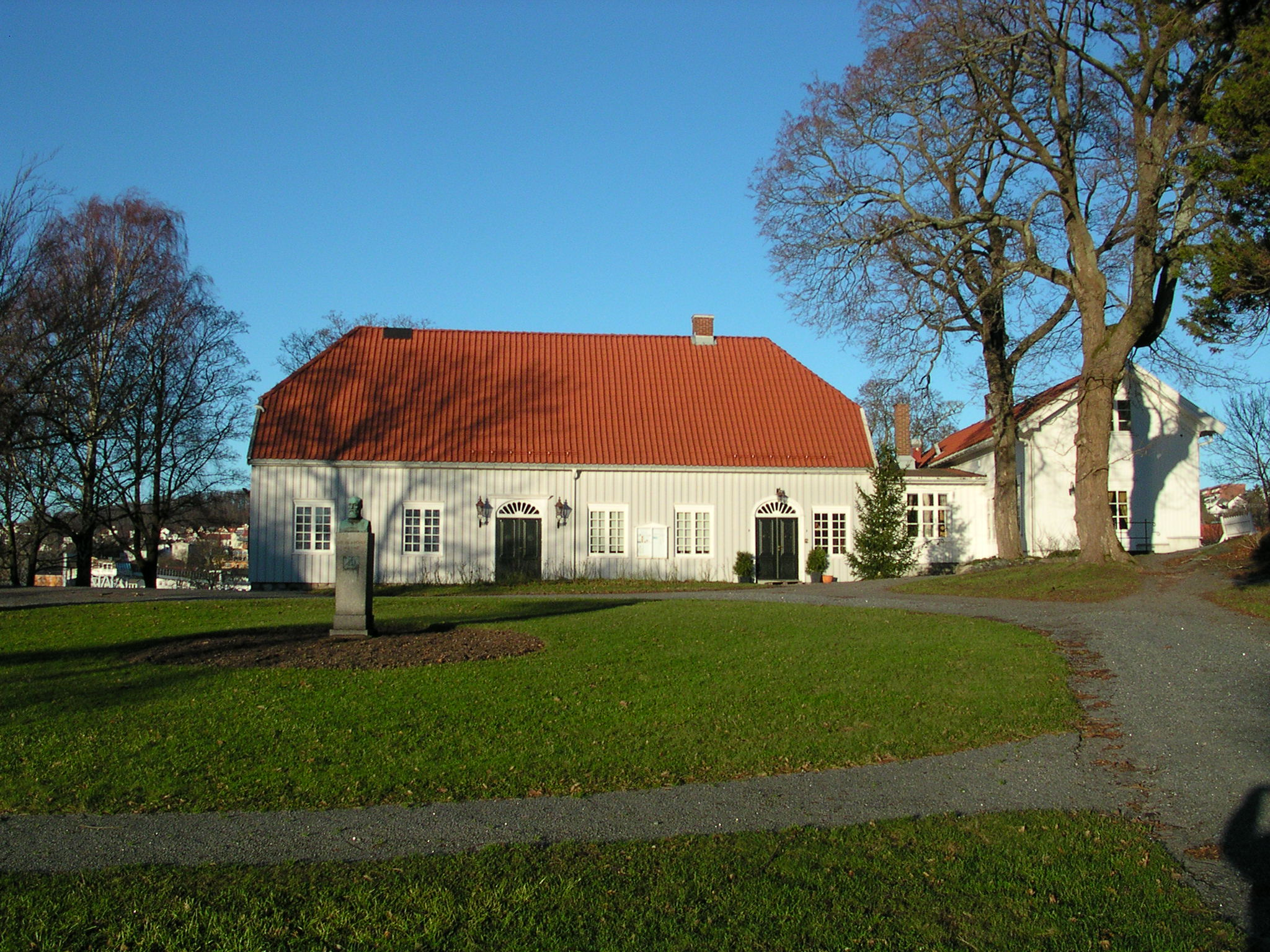
The Archer house seen from the south.

William Archer was a timber and lobster merchant in Scotland. He traded with Norway and in 1819 he visited Norway and Larvik, living there for long periods as agent for the Scottish business.

Business did not go too well, so he decided to emigrate to Larvik and be an exporter there. He bought a sailing ship Pomona and with his wife and their eight children, sailed to Larvik in 1824 and founded an export company for timber and lobster. In 1826 they bought the Customs/shipowner house which property still included the whole west part of Tollerodden with shoreline from the town side and all around to the southeast.

=== The Archer brothers move to Australia ===
William Archer's wife, whose maiden name was Walker, had an uncle in Australia and when business was not going well in Norway, sent their sons to the uncle in New South Wales, near Sydney, where they started sheep farming. Eight of the Archer brothers emigrated, the first in 1834.

==== Tolderodden Conservation Park, Eidsvold, Queensland, Australia ====
The older Archer brothers, although born in Scotland and teenagers when they emigrated, loved Tollerodden, Larvik and Norway. They therefore named several places they acquired in Australia with Norwegian names. After some years near Sydney, the brothers started exploring areas further north to find better farming land. One place they stopped at was 700 kilometers further north, northwest of Brisbane. They called the place Eidsvold (spelt the old way with "ld") named after the town where the Norwegian Constitution was drawn up and signed in 1814. Their settlement is now known as Eidsvold Homestead. They also named an area Tolderodden, now known as Tolderodden Conservation Park.

==== Colin Archer joined his brothers ====
Colin was born at Tollerodden in 1832 as the twelfth child. He loved sailing like most youngsters brought up by the fjords and skerries. After school he was an apprentice at a shipyard for 18 months.

In 1851 Colin's father found a ship bound for America and sent him off to join his elder brothers in Australia. After meeting a brother in California and one in Hawaii, he ended up in Australia after two years travel and adventure.

==== Gracemere Homestead in Rockhampton ====
When Colin arrived in Australia, the family decided to move to the new place and Colin thus became part owner of the new farm. The new place was located near to what is now known as Rockhampton and they called their farm Gracemere after one of the brothers' wife. The buildings still exist and are now known as Gracemere Homestead.

=== Colin Archer returns home; naval architect and yard owner ===
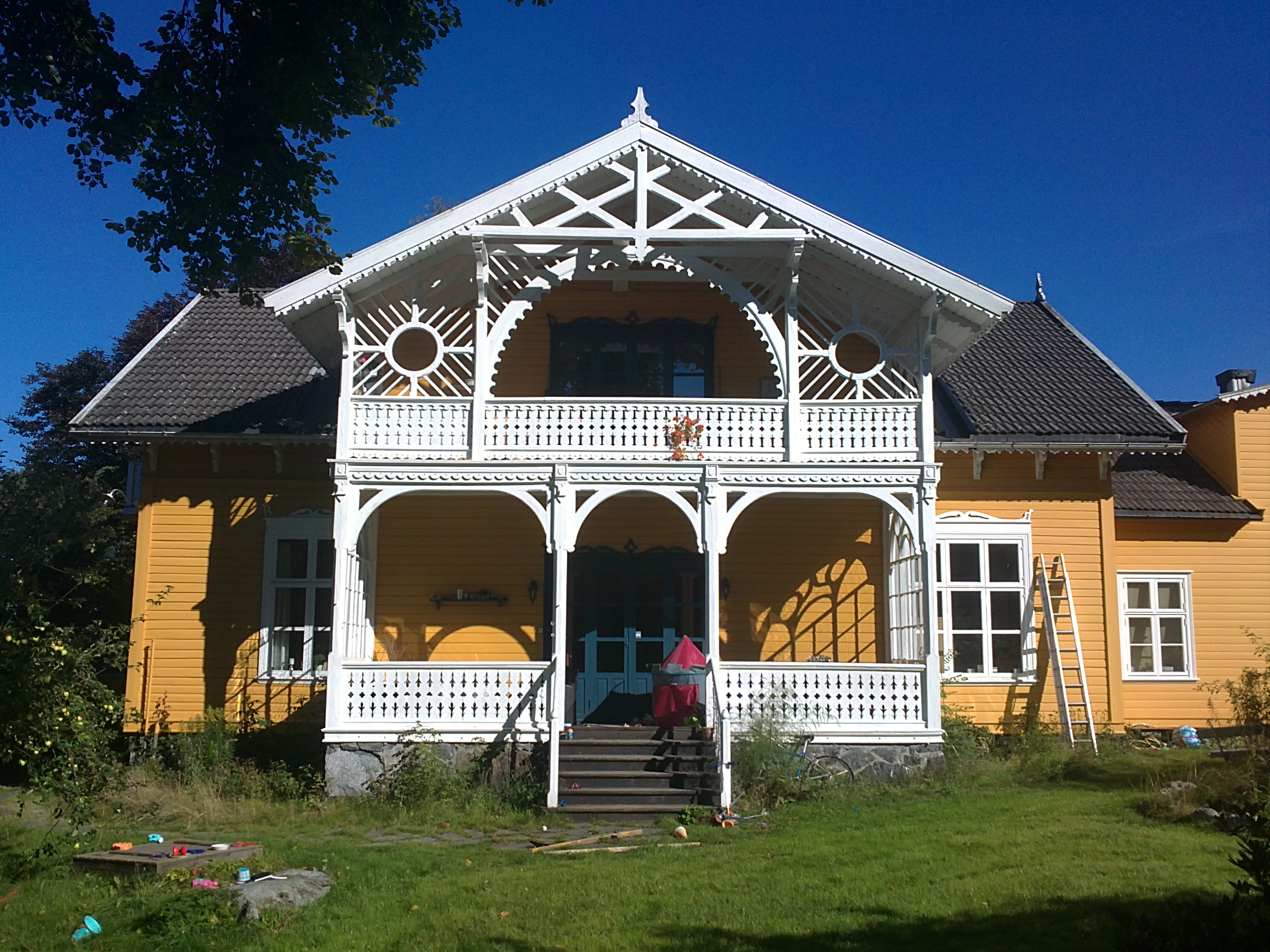
Colin Archer and his wife's house built in 1869. They called it "Lilleodden" and address is Kirkestedet 11.

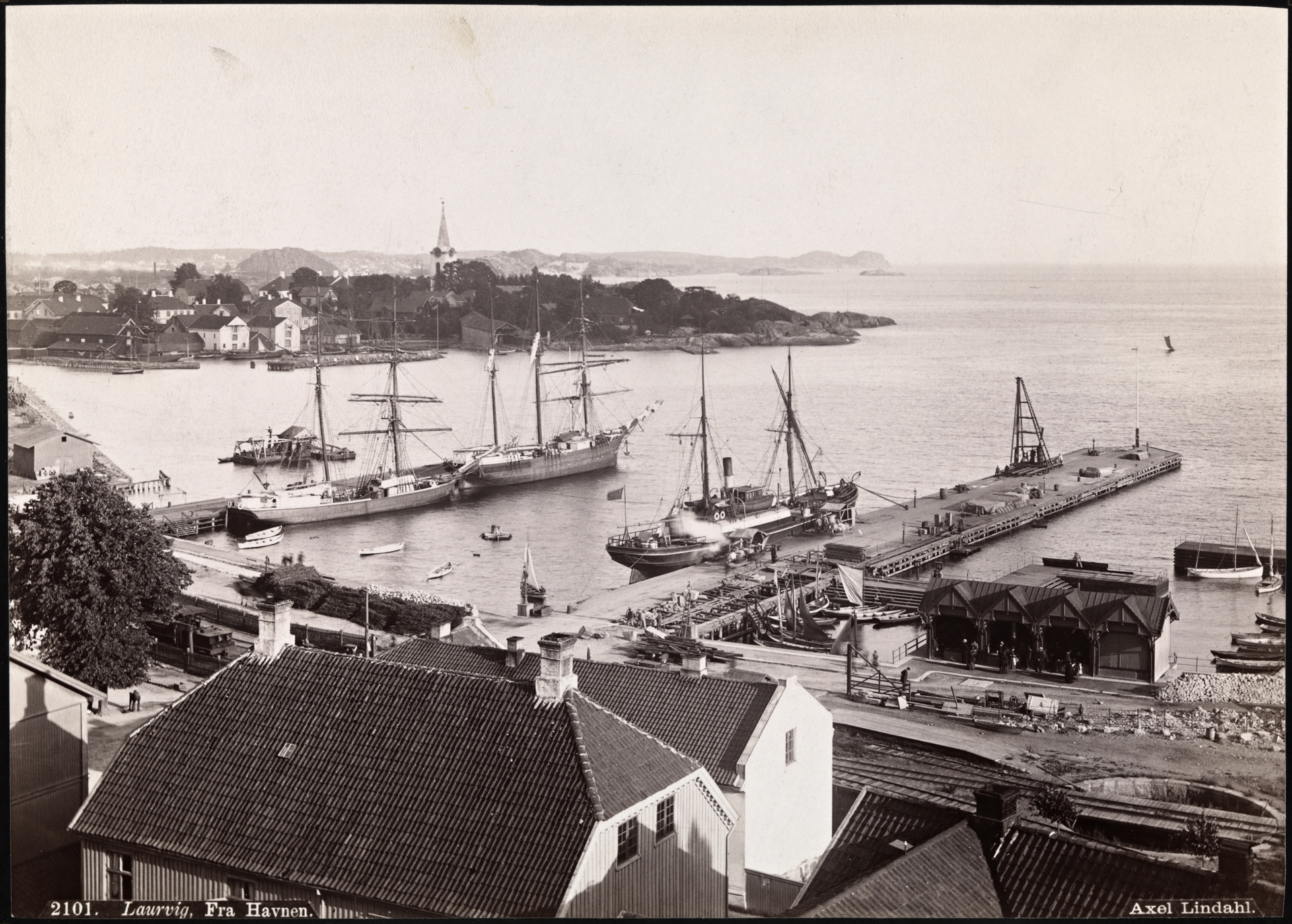
Photo c. 1880. Archer's yard can be seen between the masts of the three masted Barkentine.

When the parents were getting old, the brothers in Australia, decided to return home in 18 month shifts to look after them and a sister was also still living at home. Colin was no. 2 and arrived home in 1861. He was then well off with income from his part ownership in the farm and had also invested in other companies.

When Colin arrived Tollerodden, the parents' house, where two of Colin's sisters also still lived, desperately needed repair. Colin estimated this to cost 2000–3000 dollars and the brothers agreed to split the costs between them.

Colin took up sailing and started building small boats in his spare time. Boatbuilding interested him so much that he started to study all available literature on Naval Architecture. Being well off, he could afford expensive books like Chapman's and Scott Russel's books. After meeting a woman who interested him, he decided to stay and build boats. They married in 1869 and had a new house built, just 25 metres from the parents' house. The house also served as his design office.

At first, the larger boats were built outdoors, but in 1872 he had a shed built on the town side of Tollerodden. After he had built his first small boats, he employed boatbuilders to work for him and became a professional naval architect. He titled himself as yard owner. Some years later further boat building sheds were added.

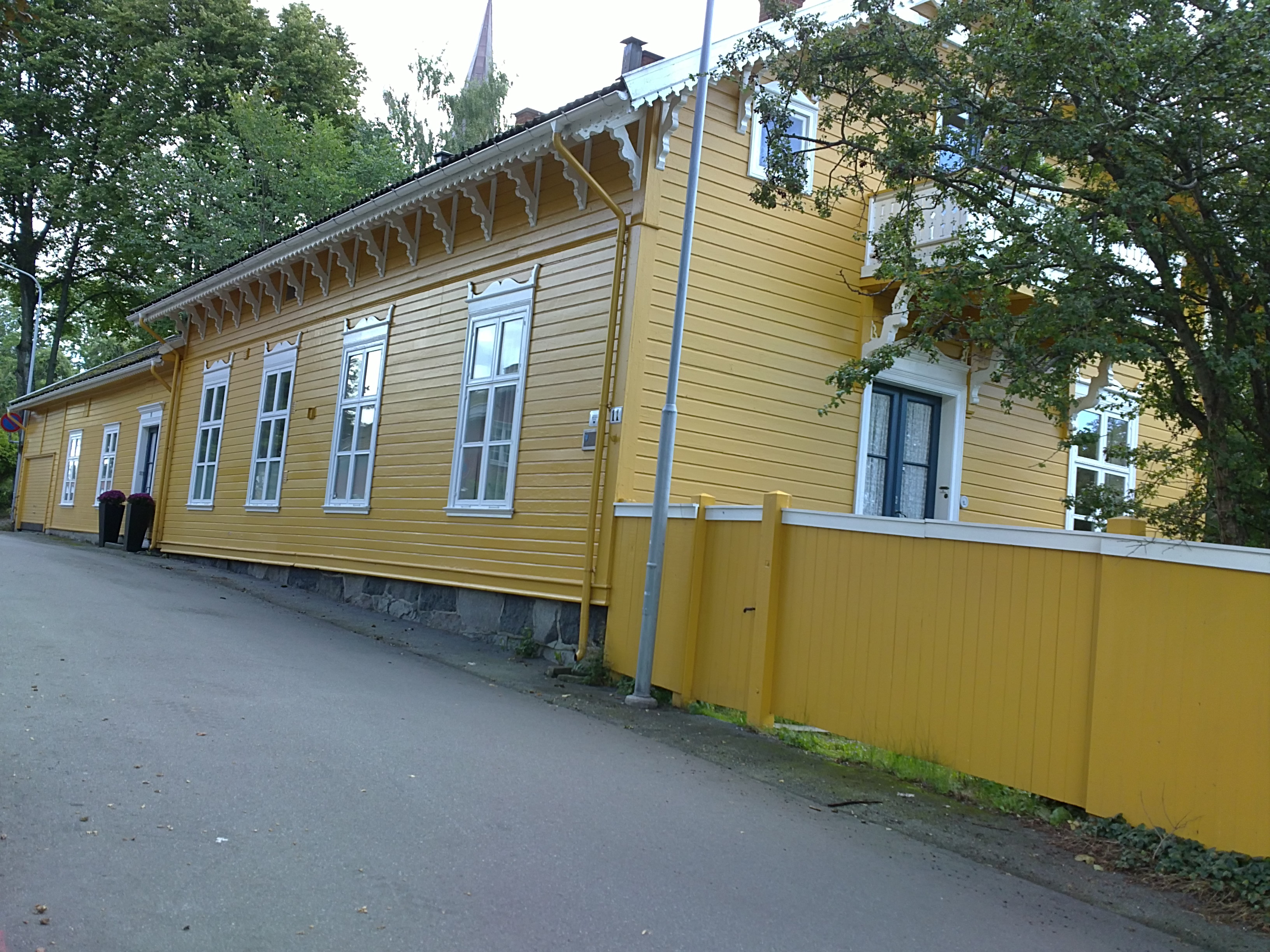
Colin's house "Lilleodden" seen from the street.

The good income from his Australian interests allowed him to build boats without a customer and he introduced the latest international knowledge into his designs. The Norwegian pilot boats at the time were of the old type "cod’s head-mackerel tail" type, lightly ballasted and not very seaworthy. Colin might have thought it would be easy to get into the pilot boat market, but conservatism in the workboats industry prevented substantial changes. So, in 1873, he decided to go for larger ships and bought a share in a yard further out in the Larvik fjord at Rekkevik, called "Laurvig Strandværft".

However, he kept getting orders for pilot boats, so boatbuilding at Tollerodden was continued.

In 1877 he published his Wave-form Theory for boat and ship design in The Field and had it read at the British Institution of Naval Architects. His theory was a variation of John Scott Russell's famous Wave-line Theory. By questioning this with what many regarded as more logical and thought-through, Colin Archer became well known long before he had taken the most important steps in improving the Norwegian pilot boats.

He gradually became famous for his fast and seaworthy pilot boats with ballast keels and especially for his rescue boats, a larger and heavy weather version of the pilot boats. In 1892 he built the polar ship Fram that became famous for its voyages close to both the north and south poles.

Colin ran his business until 1909, when he was aged 77. His young foreman would have continued the business in another location if he had not died suddenly that same year. The Tollerodden yard was thereafter used for laying up boats for winter and for boat maintenance.

== Street names at Tollerodden ==
The curved street that goes past the Customs house was called Tolbodgaten (Customs Street), but this was later changed to the current name, Kirkestredet (Church Path). The street leading up to the church from the town side was called Kirkegaten (Church Street) but was renamed to Colin Archers gate (street) in 1917, three years before Colin Archer died.

== Tollerodden bought by Larvik town ==
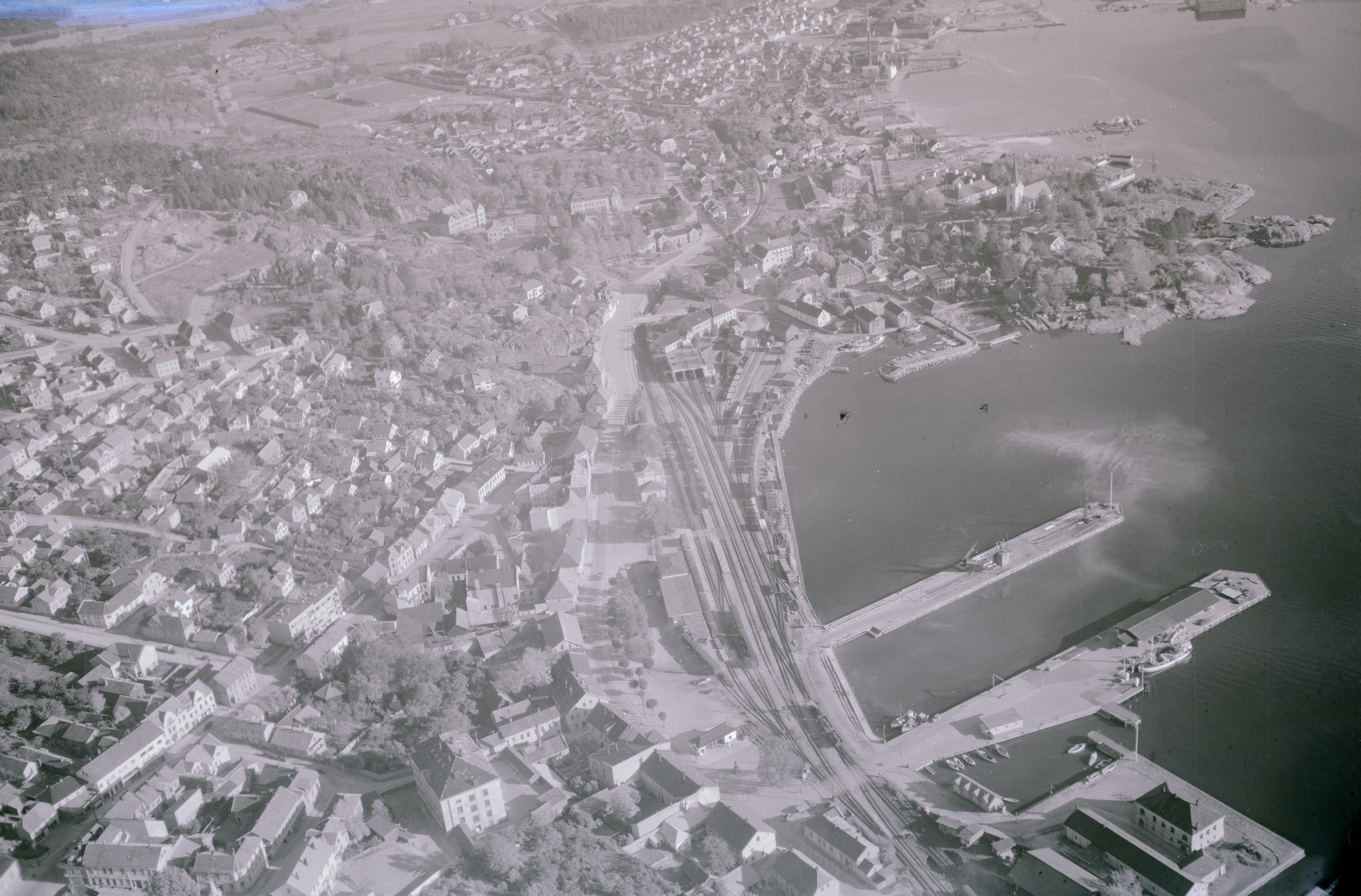
Tollerodden top right. The remainder of Archer's yard can be seen to the right with smaller boats being laid up outside the shed. Photo 1940–1960.

In 1939, the Archer family sold their property to Larvik municipality. The yard was still used for laying up boats, but the boatsheds and sailmaker's house were pulled down one after the other, the last in the 1970s and the area made into a park. However, the yard’s launching slipways were kept and are still there. Tollerodden became a popular public area, especially the pond on the south side suitable for children to learn to swim.

=== Customs/Archer house ===
The Larvik municipality used the Customs/Archer house for many different purposes, such as a kindergarten, schools, and other municipal needs. Eventually, it was used as social housing with poor maintenance and vandalism, and in the early 1990s the municipality wanted to demolish the house. Enthusiasts argued against the demolition, and in 1992, a foundation was formed and was given the building. The building is now immaculately restored, and this work revealed hidden building details from the 1790s, totally unknown at the time of the work.

== Tollerodden today ==
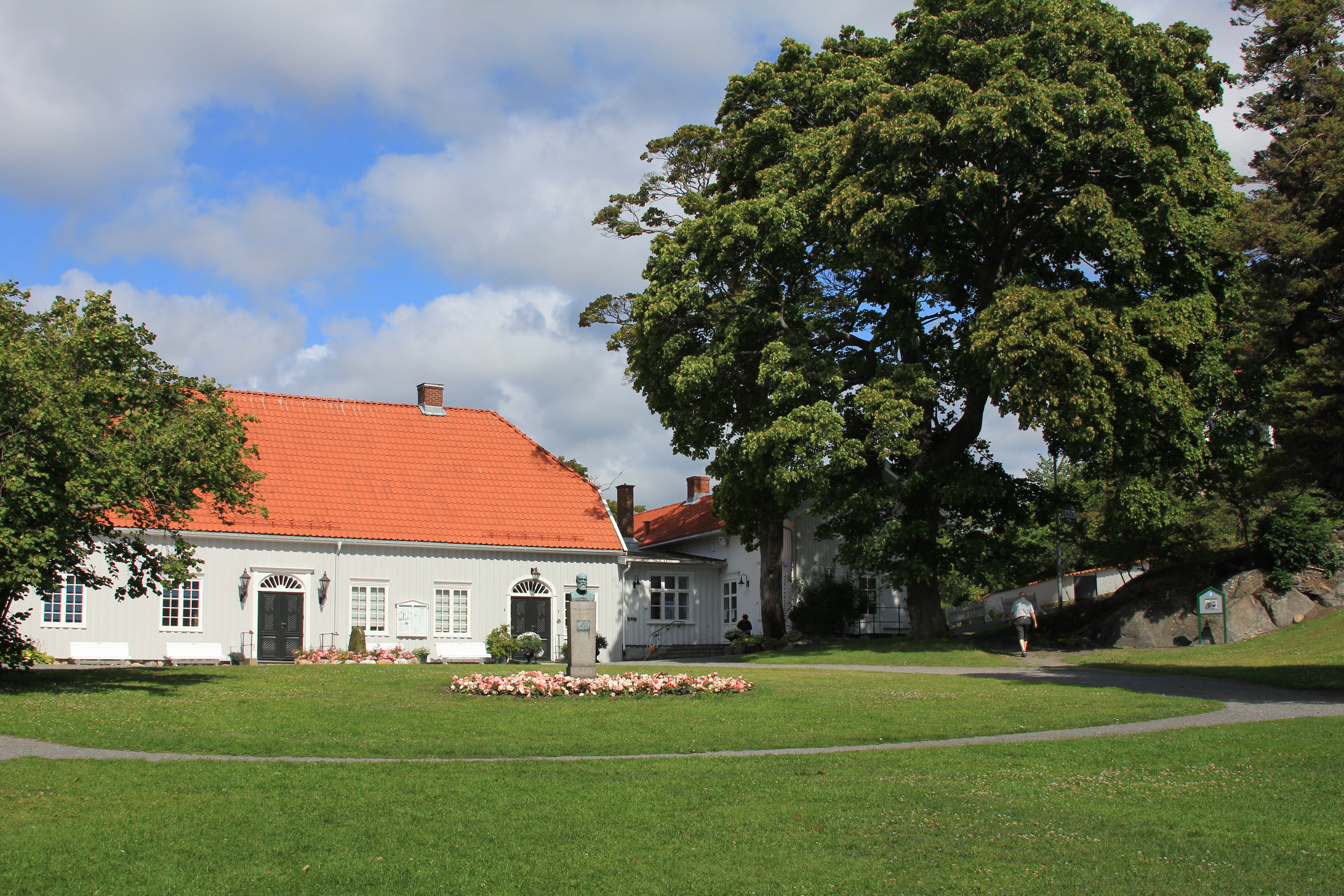
The Archer house where the summer cafe is located today.

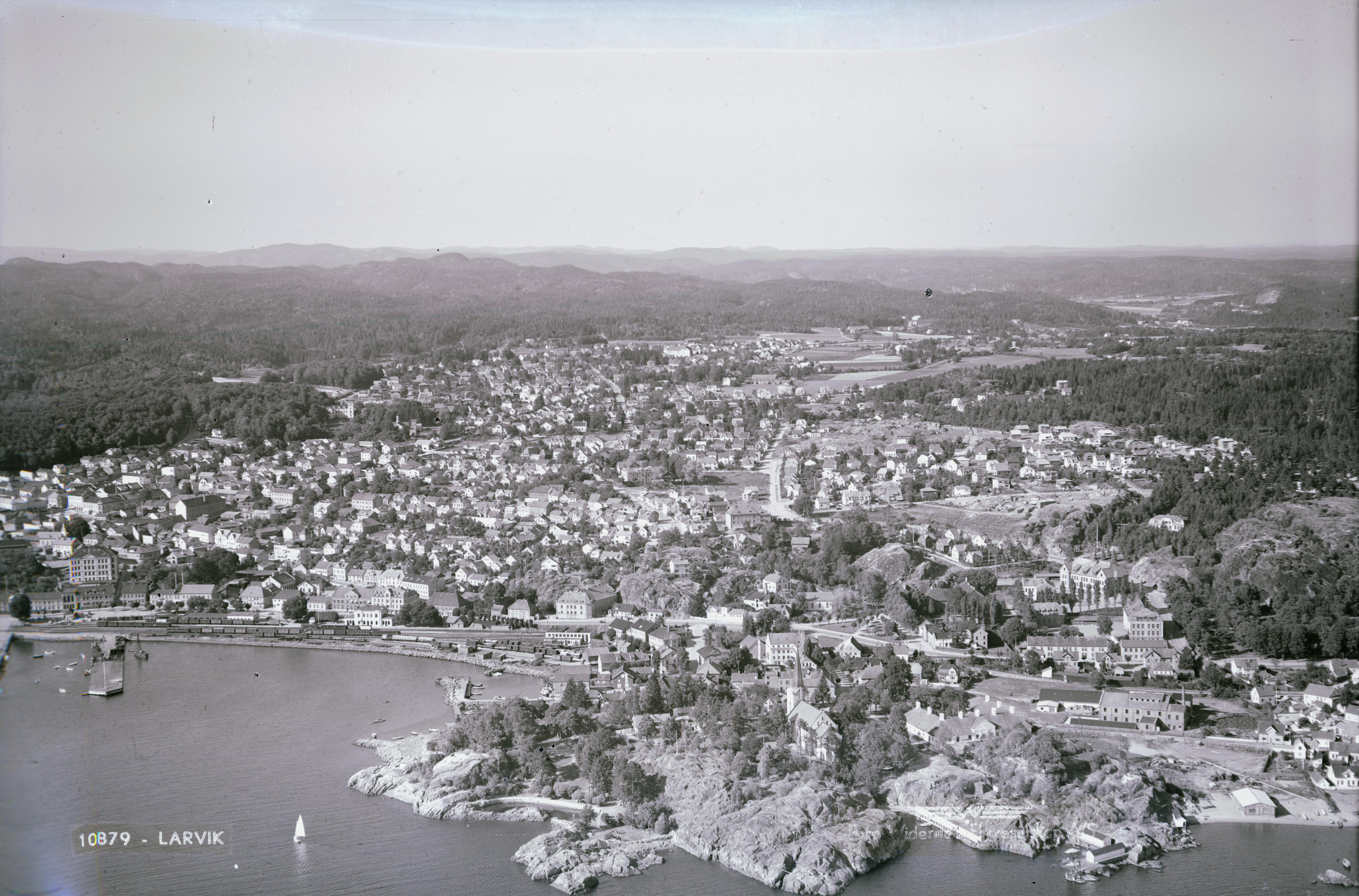
An aerial photograph: Larvik seen from the south, with Tollerodden in the foreground, taken in 1947.

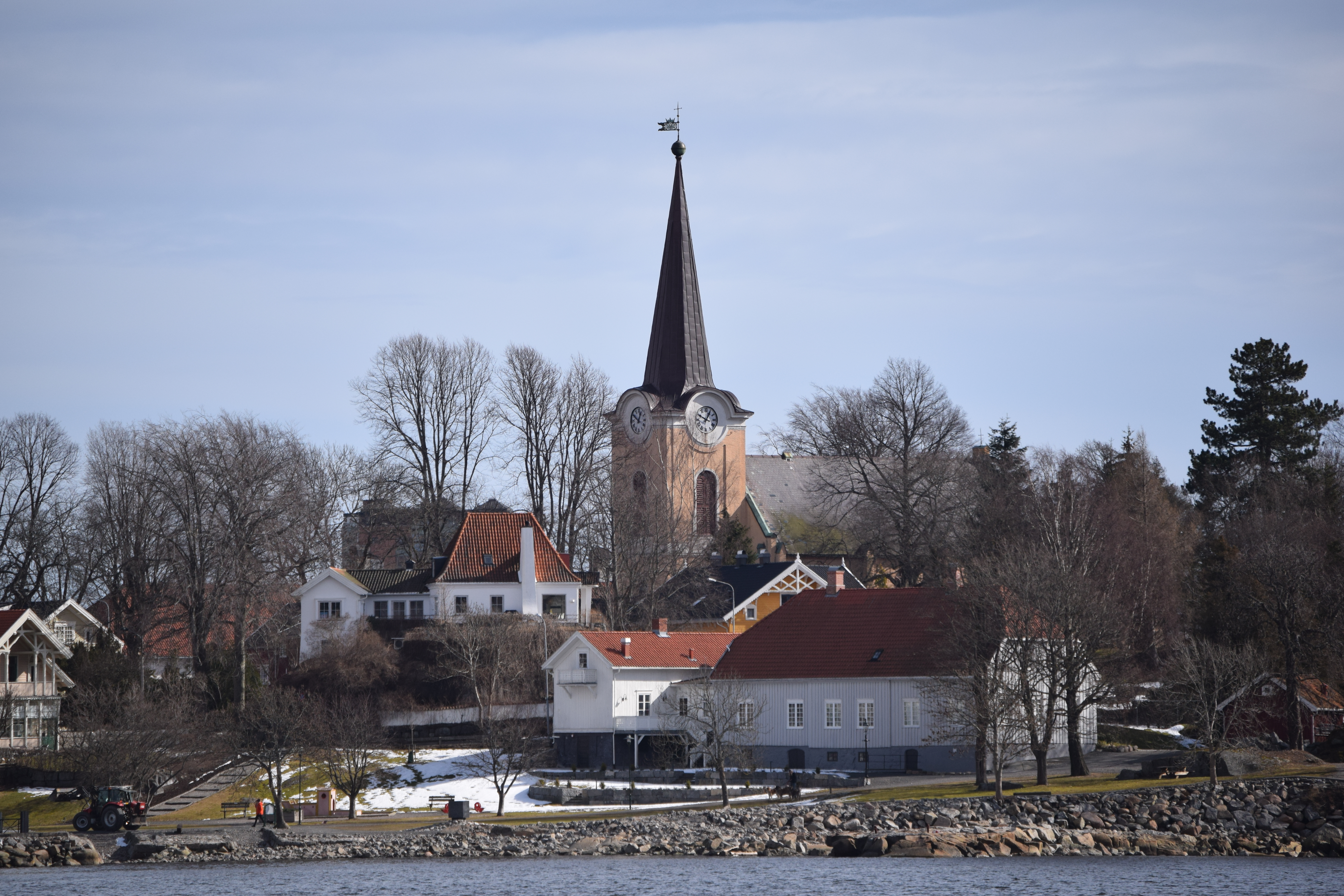
Tollerodden 2016. Archer parents' house to the right and Colin's is the yellow just above.

Tollerodden has not changed much since the Archers’ time. The Archer property with its large garden and park, still with the pond, are all restored to the Archer period, and is a popular area for Larvik citizens all year.

== Sources ==
- Johnsen, Oscar Albert (1923). Larviks historie. 1 : Larviks historie indtil 1814 (in Norwegian). Kristiania, Norway: Grøndahl & Søn.
- Langeland, A. St. (1953). Larviks historie. 2 : 1814-1885 (in Norwegian). Larvik, Norway: Larvik kommune.
- Langeland, A. St. (1963). Larviks historie. 3 : 1885-1940 (in Norwegian). Larvik, Norway: Larvik kommune.
- Aagaard, Aage (1900). Larvik og omegns industri og næringsliv i tekst og bilder (in Norwegian). Christiania, Norway: A.M. Hanches forlag.
- McDonald, Lorna (1997). Magic ships: life story of Colin Archer, 1832–1921, and Sailing for pleasure. Central Queensland University Press. ISBN 1875998268.
- McDonald, Lorna (1991). Over Earth and Ocean. The Archers of Tolderodden and Gracemere. Central Queensland University Press. ISBN 0702231452.
- McDonald, Lorna (1981). Sketches of Old Rockhampton. Sketches by Edith Neish. St Lucia, Queensland: University of Queensland Press. ISBN 0702216313.
- Svendsen, Terje (November 2020). Tollerodden - fra privat prakt til folkets oase. Tollerodden Foundation.
- Nielsen, Jeppe Jul; Archer, James Ronald (November 2019). Colin Archer. Den verdenskjente båtkonstruktøren på Tollerodden. Tollerodden Foundation.
- Leather, John (1979). Colin Archer and the Seaworthy Double-Ender. International Marine Publishing Company. ISBN 0877420866.
- Sannes, Tor Borch (1984). Batbyggeren Colin Archer. Oslo, Norway: Norsk Maritimt Forlag. pp. 304–417. ISBN 8290319053.
