= Gracemere Homestead =

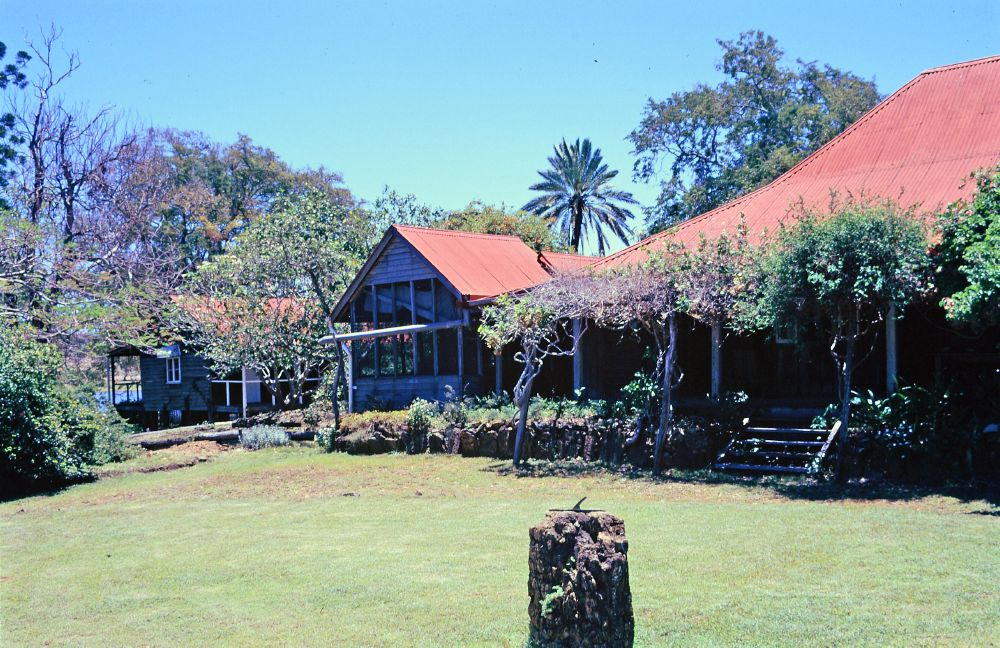
- Gracemere Homestead, 1996

- Location within Queensland Location within Australia
- 23.4267°S 150.446°E
- Location: 234 Gracemere Road, Gracemere, Rockhampton Region, Queensland, Australia

History
- Design period: 1840s - 1860s (mid-19th century)
- Built: 1858 - 1890s
- Built for: Archer brothers

Queensland Heritage Register
- Official name: Gracemere Homestead
- Type: state heritage (built, landscape, archaeological)
- Designated: 21 October 1992
- Reference no.: 600508
- Significant period: 1850s-1860s (historical); 1850s-1890s (fabric)
- Significant components: office/s, yards - livestock, mill - wind, decorative features, boat shed, wall/s - retaining, shed/s, tree groups - avenue of, jetty/pier, residential accommodation - guest house/s, furniture/fittings, shop - blacksmith's, residential accommodation - main house, out building/s, store/s / storeroom / storehouse, chimney/chimney stack, kitchen/kitchen house, garden - rock / rockery, garden - ornamental/flower, tank - water

Gracemere Homestead is a heritage-listed homestead at 234 Gracemere Road, Gracemere, Rockhampton Region, Queensland, Australia. It was built from 1858 to 1890s. It was added to the Queensland Heritage Register on 21 October 1992.

== History ==
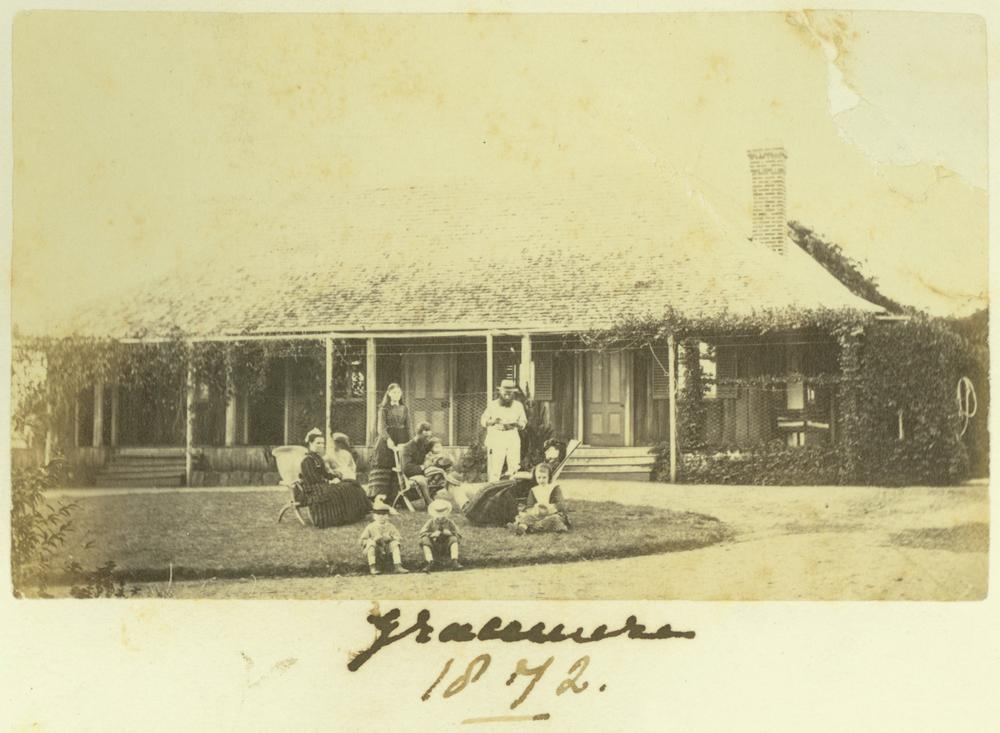
Archer family having tea on the lawn at Gracemere, 1872

Gracemere Homestead comprises a number of single storey, timber and corrugated iron structures, including a large house, characteristic of a Central Queensland pastoral property established during the 1850s. These structures are complemented by an extensive sub-tropical garden and other significant landscape elements. The Archer family and their family company have owned Gracemere Homestead for almost 150 years. The first wing of the house was designed by Colin Archer and built in 1858. An additional wing was constructed sometime between 1862 and 1874. Charles and William Archer were the first Europeans to enter the area where the homestead and the city of Rockhampton now stand.

The Archers were of Scottish extraction but in 1825 the family moved to Larvik in southern Norway. Each of the nine sons eventually came to Australia, remaining for varying periods of time before returning to Europe. The first son significant to the story of Gracemere Homestead was David Archer, who arrived in 1834 to work on an uncle's property in New South Wales. Two of his brothers, Thomas and William, followed in 1837. The young men formed a partnership to establish Durundur, a sheep station on the Stanley River north of Brisbane in 1840–41. They were amongst the earliest pastoralists in the Moreton Bay region. Seeking further pastoral land they explored north along the river systems, selecting Emu Creek, Cooyar, Coonambula and Eidsvold on the Upper Burnett in 1848. Sometime between 1843 and 1852 the eldest Archer son, Charles, arrived from Norway. In 1852 David returned to Norway and was replaced by Colin, the eighth brother.

Eager to find land more suited to sheep and wool production, as were many southern pastoralists, Charles and William explored the central coast hinterland in 1853 in the wake of Ludwig Leichhardt's exploration of the area between 1844 and 1846.

On 4 May 1853 the Archer party reached the top of the northern escarpment of the Dee Range and observed the confluence of the Dawson and Mackenzie Rivers flowing into Keppel Bay. Three days later they descended into the valley and discovered what Charles described as a "magnificent sheet of water". It was named Farris [later to be renamed Gracemere] after a lake near their hometown of Larvik in Norway. Charles identified his ideal site for a house on a peninsula midway along its eastern shore. The brothers then explored further east along the Fitzroy River to Keppel Bay in July and August 1853.

While on these trips, Charles made semi-professional maps, which were used to construct the first official map ever published of the central coast hinterland in January 1854, when the New South Wales government proclaimed the Port Curtis and Leichhardt pastoral districts open for settlement. In 1854 the Archer brothers took up a total of twelve runs in the Port Curtis district, including Charles Archer's Farris run. Being in what was classified as a "settled" district, Port Curtis runs were subject to possible resumption, which prompted the Archers to seek land further inland in the "unsettled" districts. In 1854, they were the first Europeans to reach Peak Downs after Leichhardt's aborted effort in 1847.

In August 1855 Charles stocked Farris run with sheep, and set about establishing it as the Archers' head station in the Port Curtis district. Around this time the brothers decided that Farris lake and run would be renamed Gracemere after Thomas Archer's wife Grace. Thomas, another of the Archer brothers, had made his way to Australia in 1853 and he and his wife had resided at Eidsvold Station in the Burnett until returning to Europe in 1855.

Upon arrival at Gracemere, Charles Archer began the task of equipping the station with the necessary buildings and structures such as stockyards, a shearing shed and huts for the workers. In 1856 Colin moved from Coonambula to Gracemere, and the firms David Archer & Co and Charles and Thomas Archer were amalgamated, becoming Archer & Co. A shingle-roofed structure, known as Bachelor's Hall, was built to house the brothers. Also, a visitor to the station, George Elliot, died of natural causes and was buried in what was to become the garden. He and his brother, "Hobby" Elliot, a notable pastoralist in the district, were friends of the Archers. Charles returned to Norway at the end of 1856.

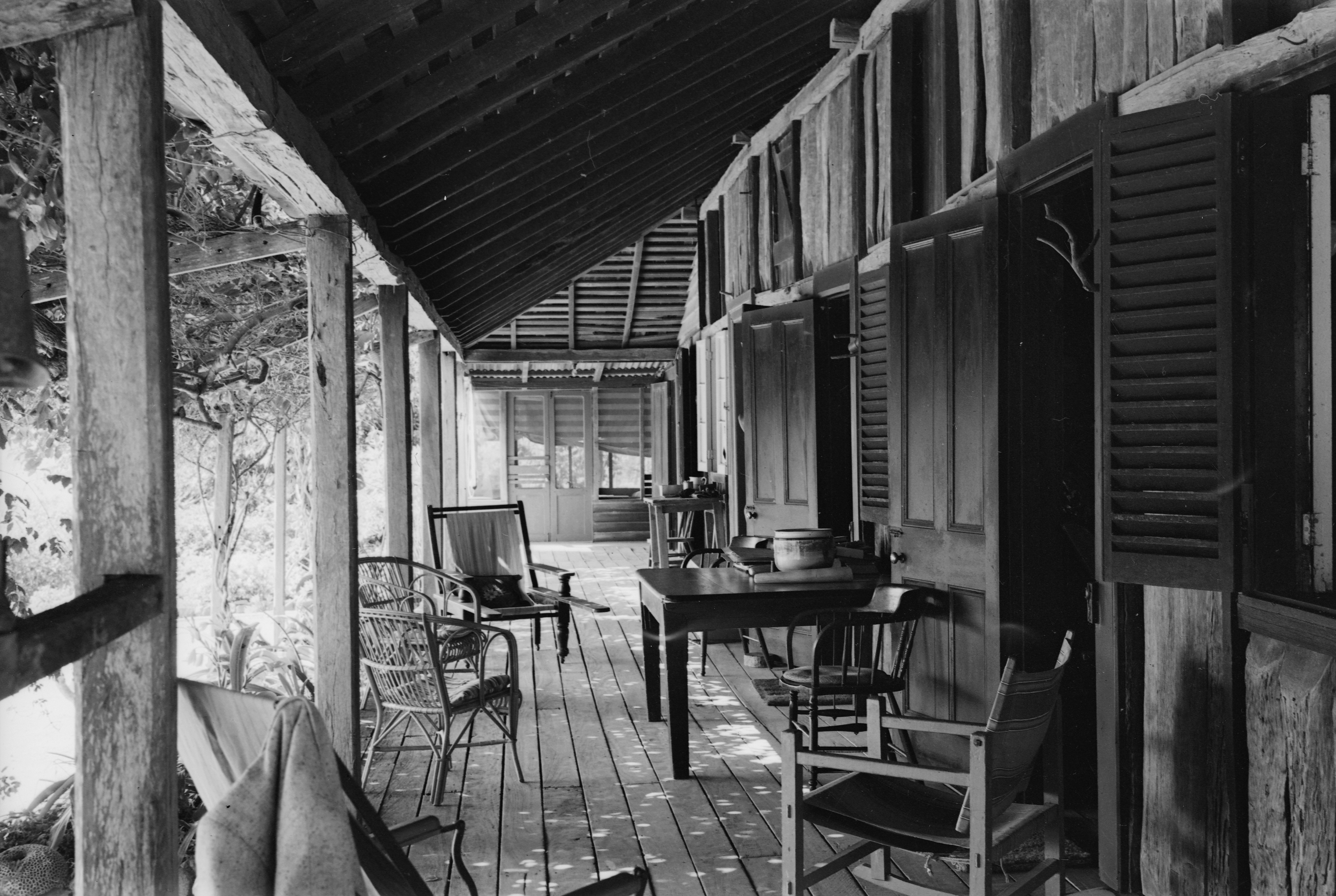
Verandah of Gracemere Homestead, 1940

In 1858 Colin Archer designed and constructed the surviving slab house at Gracemere homestead. All the timber for wall framing and roof cladding was felled on the property. According to Colin's journal the house took from May to July to complete. It was sited to the immediate east of Bachelor's Hall, on the sloping peninsula identified by Charles in 1853. In plan the house was a simple rectangle, the long sides of which faced east and west. It contained two large rooms, one designated as a sitting room with fireplace. The walls of this structure were clad in vertical ironbark slabs and the roof with timber shingles. Experienced with the regional sub-tropical climate, Colin ensured that the rooms of his house were shaded on two sides by verandahs. The west-facing verandah was shaded further by a timber pergola, which quickly became overgrown with bougainvillea.

The composition of the outer walls of the house reveals the degree to which the designer strived to incorporate passive cooling mechanisms and his ability to creatively utilise available materials. The walls were four metres in height. Colin employed a continuous wall plate or tie beam at the heads of all windows and doors to create top and bottom wall plates. In the upper section were placed a series of ventilation openings. The availability of lengths of trees suitable for splitting slabs influenced this decision. Sections of the outer iron bark slab walls were arranged to ensure that joining studs in the wall would meet tie beams in the ceiling. This junction is noticeable along the top plate. Also, the verandah windows featured shelf-like sills that positioned earthenware flasks of cool water "known as water monkeys" to catch the slightest breeze.

A further wing was added prior to the 1874 arrival of Thomas and Grace Archer and their large family, and after 1861 when Sandy (Alexander) Archer lived for a year at Gracemere and sketched the original house. The new wing created an L-shaped plan that extended toward the east. It contained two large rooms, for dining and sleeping, and one small room. The design of this addition harmonized with that of the existing wing: it was one room deep, had four-metre high outer walls, a matching roof pitch, and verandahs placed on all sides. The walls were clad in pit-sawn Burdekin Plum (Pleiogynium timoriense). It is not clear whether Colin Archer was involved with the design of this extension, as he returned to Norway in 1861, but a number of his key design features were carried through.

Other buildings constructed around 1858 include: servant's quarters, office and bookkeeper's quarters, carpenter and blacksmith's shop, stables and cattle yards. Opposite these, on the southern side of the entrance roadway, were sited a number of worker's cottages and a woolshed. This collection of buildings supported a bustling community. A Banyan Tree (Ficus bengalensis) was planted to mark the entrance to the settlement.

It is unclear precisely when the Bachelor's Hall was removed and a screened room inserted on the north-western corner of the house. The Hall is visible in a 1908 photograph, but another taken in 1930 reveals that it had been removed by then. Also, the narrow verandah originally built onto the east-facing end of the later wing had been enclosed by 1907. A guest cottage built equidistant between the servants' quarters and kitchen must have been constructed at some time following the demolition of Bachelor's Hall in the early 20th century.

When first exploring the area it was Charles who imagined a house on the Gracemere peninsula and conceived of its general relationship to the lagoon being mediated by a garden, however, it was William Archer who laid out the homestead's extensive garden after 1858. Its design partially emulates that of the family home, Tolderodden, which was originally used as the Larvik Customs House. It was surrounded on three sides by the sea and the brothers' father landscaped its gardens down to the water's edge. Gracemere's garden design comprised two sections: formal surrounds to the house made of raised planting beds retained behind stone walls and containing small scale shrubbery; and beyond this, larger trees scattered informally down to the lagoon shore. A series of gravelled or stone-edged pathways led visitors to various destination points around the lagoon. The stone walls surrounding the front circular lawn and raised garden beds were constructed by miners made destitute by the failure of the 1858 Canoona gold rush. During the 1860s plant stock was brought from the Sydney Botanical Gardens to establish the Gracemere garden, to which many Central Queensland trees and shrubs can trace their origins.

The Norwegian naturalist and explorer Carl Lumholtz lived for almost a year at Gracemere homestead c. 1880 and described the garden twenty years after it was established. He catalogued the varieties of shrubs and trees growing there, including orange trees, pineapple and mango, the Madagascar delonix (poinciana), the Brazilian jacaranda, several sorts of Australian conifer, and a beautiful specimen of the bunya-bunya (Araucaria bidwillii). Lumholtz also took note of the large iron water tanks positioned at each corner of the house.

In October 1858 Rockhampton was proclaimed a town. Gracemere lost one square mile of riverside land to the new municipality and its town side boundary was relocated only a couple of kilometres from the homestead. In 1856 the Crown Lands Commissioner for Leichhardt had consulted Charles Archer regarding a suitable site for the township. The place on the Fitzroy River where vessels were unloading goods for Gracemere was selected, at a point where a sandy bay crossed the river. There was a suggestion that the new town be named Charleston in honour of its founder, but he modestly declined this honour and Rockhampton, meaning "town near the rocks in the river" was chosen.

Colin Archer began his return journey to Norway in September 1861. Just before he arrived Charles died, requiring Colin to stay permanently in Norway to assist his mother. He eventually married a Norwegian woman and started his own business as a naval architect and boat builder, becoming famous for building many kinds of seaworthy vessels. Most renowned was the polar ship, the Fram, which brought the Norwegian explorers Nansen and Amundsen on their voyages to the Arctic and Antarctic. A photograph of the Fram was hanging in Gracemere's dining room in 1913. Colin also achieved fame for his designs for pilot boats and rescue cutters or lifeboats, his work revolutionising boating safety.

During 1861 and 1862 the Archers were able to pre-emptively purchase the land on which the homestead was sited. Archer & Co. sought to have its twelve runs in the Port Curtis District, including what was still known officially as Farris, consolidated under the name Gracemere, which had been used by the family since 1855. They were initially successful. However, Crown Law Officers provided a late opinion that the consolidation was illegal and the Government proclamation advertising it was cancelled. The issue was not resolved until 1875 when William Archer petitioned the Queensland parliament to obtain pre-emptive rights over certain leased portions of Gracemere on which approximately £10,000 worth of improvements had been made, resulting in the "Gracemere Pre-emptive Bill" being passed. Leases on the relevant runs were granted from 1862 and the company continued to pay rent until, after they voluntarily surrendered what remained of it, the leased portions of the run were resumed in 1876.

It was during this period that a further Archer son and brother made Queensland his home. Archibald Archer (Archie) settled at Gracemere in 1860 after trying various entrepreneurial activities in Polynesia. In 1865 he and William became committee members of the Queensland Land League. In June 1867 Archie was elected to the Queensland Legislative Assembly in the new seat of Rockhampton. In parliament he promoted land legislation reform and played a pivotal role in the drafting of the Crown Lands Alienation Act 1868. After returning from Europe in 1870, Archie was elected to the seat of Blackall adjoining Rockhampton, holding it until 1886. In 1888 he was elected again as Member for Rockhampton and retained this seat until 1896 when he resigned in order to return to the family home in Norway. He was also heavily involved in the separation movement, which sought to have northern and central Queensland made a separate colony. During all his years in the Queensland parliament he resided principally at Gracemere homestead.

In 1866 and 1867 Queensland experienced a severe economic recession. Gracemere's prospects as a pastoral station were never to match its earlier successes. At the end of this decade the Archers made a change from sheep to cattle on Gracemere. It was determined that sheep did not grow high-grade wool in coastal country, but more significantly local meat processing facilities had developed. The family company had established one of Queensland's first Hereford studs in 1862.

While members of the second generation of Archers had started to arrive in Australia and take jobs on the Archer company's properties as early as the mid-1850s, it was not until David Archer's son, Robert Stubbs Archer, commenced management of Gracemere that a real handover of control started. During the 1870s, James, the youngest of the original Archer brothers, had managed Gracemere before taking on the management of Minnie Downs in 1880. When he returned to Europe in 1883, Robert Stubbs Archer was considered competent to manage Gracemere alone. He married Alice Manon (Daisy) Marwedel in 1889 and they began a family at the homestead.

Daisy Archer, and later her daughter Joan born in 1890, were largely responsible for the woodcarvings that decorate the interior of the main house at Gracemere Homestead. Daisy's interest in woodcarving had been inspired chiefly by the station bookkeeper, Henry James King-Church. He also fostered Joan's initial interest in the craft. Unlike her mother, whose work was completed for private enjoyment, Joan exhibited her work and received prizes in Rockhampton and Toowoomba. The key pieces of carving in the house decorated the sitting room. Prior to the 1890s, Daisy was responsible for carving the fireplace surrounds, the fire screen, the carved panels of the bookshelves, a spinning chair and behind this, a carved pelmet. Her husband Robert suggested that the chimneypiece be panelled and embellished, and this work was probably carried out before 1905. King-Church was responsible for the roundel at the top of the chimney, which carried the date AD 1858 and was surrounded by the motto 'East West hame's best'. Underneath it he also completed an opposing pair of griffins. Below this was Joan's first carving, matched bird panels. Daisy's carving for the bookshelves shows the inspiration she drew from Nordic folk carvings. While her cousin and fiancé Alister Archer (James Archer's son) served overseas during the First World War, Joan completed a replica of a Norwegian chair from c1200 AD that was held in the Oslo Museum. She also completed a dining room dresser. Joan continued the Nordic associations but tackled illustrative themes from folk tales and legends and included figures rather than only flowers, scrolls and other Neo-Renaissance motifs.

Throughout the term of his station management, Robert Stubbs Archer maintained Gracemere as a viable business despite facing a severe drought in 1885, floods in 1890, the arrival of the cattle tick in Queensland in 1896, and the great drought of 1898–1903, during which the Archer cattle herd was reduced from 12,000 to 2,000. In 1899 the business partnership was rearranged, with David, William and Thomas carrying on the firm as Archer Brothers. In 1907 the firm became a limited liability company, with Robert as Chairman of Directors and having full power to carry on its business. Seven years later, in a scheme devised by Robert, the almost debt free leases to Torsdale, a property held in partnership between himself and his brother, were amalgamated with the holdings of Archer Brothers Ltd. This exercise involved much personal sacrifice by Robert and his brother, James, to save the family firm. Robert Stubbs Archer died in 1926. Apart from having managed Gracemere for over 40 years, he served as President of the Rockhampton Agricultural Society for thirty years, Chairman of the Rockhampton Harbour Board, and as the local Director of the Mount Morgan Gold Mining Company.

Robert's son-in-law and nephew, Alister Archer, took over management of Gracemere following Robert's death. In 1947, at a Board meeting of Archer Brothers Ltd, it was agreed that all properties would be sold. Originally Gracemere was to be sold with Torsdale, including the homestead lot, however when no offers were received the properties were offered separately. After Torsdale was finally sold in 1949, the directors agreed that the Gracemere head station block be sold to Joan and Alister Archer. Their son Cedric and his wife and child returned to assist the couple maintain the property. Daisy Archer also returned and worked on the garden.

The homestead block remains in the Archer family. On a nearby rise, accessed via a nearly one kilometre long entrance avenue, is the station cemetery. Once on the homestead allotment, the Crown resumed the land in 1965. The first Archer to be buried there was Robert Stubbs, all previous family members returning to Europe before their deaths. Daisy Archer was buried there in 1952 and Alister Archer in 1965. Other people involved with the station were also interred there, such as Henry King-Church and Edward Kelly, the station's overseer during the mid to late 19th century.

== Description ==
Gracemere Homestead is located approximately 11 kilometres (6.8 mi) south-west of the Rockhampton city centre along the Capricorn Highway. It is situated on a peninsula jutting into Gracemere Lagoon, which occupies old watercourse country that takes the overflow of nearby Scrubby Creek, and whose eastern bank forms the western boundary to the Gracemere allotment. Generally, the land slopes from the north to the south of the property and is overlooked to the east by the peaks of the Berserker Range and to the south-west by those of the Dee Range.

The complex of buildings and landscape that comprise Gracemere Homestead includes: a house and extensive garden, a boat house and jetty, a guest cottage, a detached kitchen and store, an office and bookkeeper's quarters, a carpenter and blacksmith's shop, a vehicle/machinery shed, stables and attached cattle yards, and a one kilometre long avenue of Tamarind trees.

=== House ===
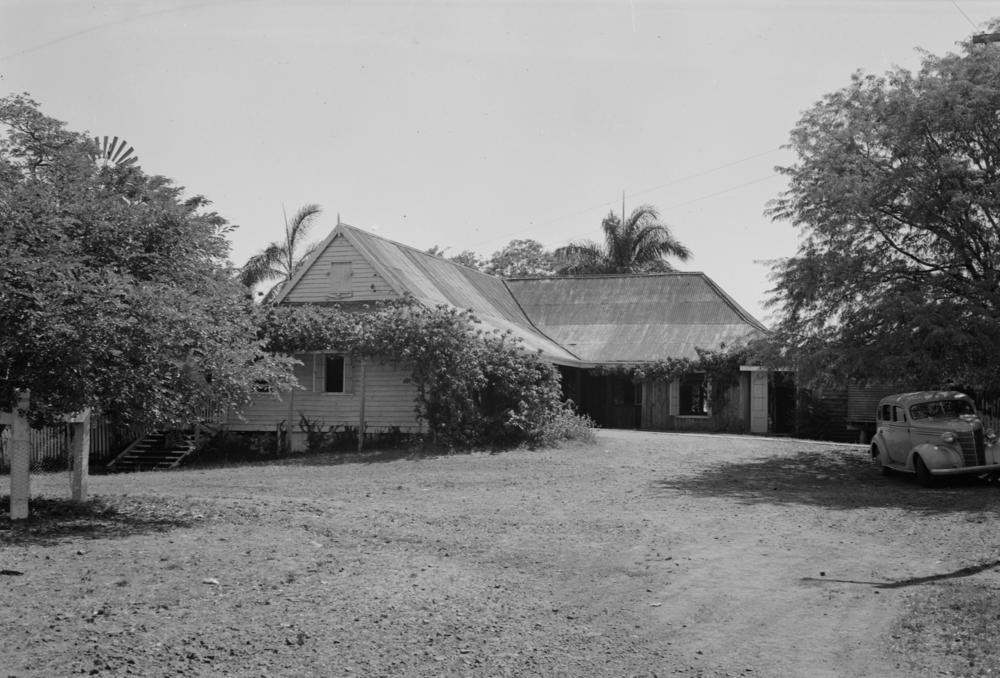
Gracemere homestead, circa 1940

Visitors approach the homestead from the east, along the avenue of Tamarind trees (Tamarindus indica). They pass a number of other buildings to the immediate north before arriving at a grassed courtyard and the eastern facades of the single-storey house designed by Colin Archer in 1858 and extended before 1874. It is L-shaped in plan with a hipped corrugated iron roof that ends in a gable on the eastern facade. The main roof extends in a broken-backed manner over the verandahs. Timber shingles are visible beneath the iron cladding. An unrendered brick chimneystack pierces the main roof in its south-west corner and fills part of the southern verandah wall.

In plan, a long sitting room extends from the south-western corner of the house toward the north. The main bedroom caps this wing. Both rooms open onto a long, deep verandah, which overlooks the lagoon to the west, and onto a smaller verandah on the eastern facade. The width of the bedroom has incorporated this smaller, east-facing verandah. On the northern end of this wing a comparatively narrow verandah separates the main bedroom from a screened room on the north-west corner and a further room between it and a corrugated iron water tank on the north-east corner. Both these rooms have individual gabled roofs of corrugated iron, the ridges of which run perpendicular to the length of this wing.

A narrow kitchen is adjacent to the sitting room in the south-facing wing. Beyond this are a dining room and a further bedroom. These rooms also open onto a long, deep verandah looking south, as well as onto a smaller verandah on the opposite facade. The verandah on the east face of this wing has been enclosed. A small room occupies the north-eastern corner of the north-facing verandah. A set of timber stairs and gate provides access to the south-facing verandah. There are corrugated iron water tanks positioned on each side of this wing.

Timber stumps support the floor framing above the ground sloping gently from the north-eastern courtyard to the south-west. The timber for the floors is imported New Zealand pine, which is known to be resistant to white ants. The main exterior walls of the house that adjoin the verandahs are four metres in height. On the west-facing wing they are made of vertical adzed ironbark slabs, while on the south-facing wing they are made of pit-sawn Burdekin Plum (Pleiogynium timorense). The framing for the walls of the west-facing wing is exposed on the exterior, with a long tie beam separating the upper and lower wall sections and creating a strong vertical datum. This plate acts as the head for all windows and doors opening onto the verandahs. A number of the upper ventilation openings remain and appear to be made of cross-braced timber boards. The wall framing on the south-facing wing is also exposed.

The verandah roofs are supported on undecorated, stop-chamfered timber posts. The exterior wall and gable on the short eastern face of the house are clad in weatherboards. The walls of the screened enclosure and other semi-detached room on the north face of the building are similarly clad. The sill height for the timber-framed screens is low, set at approximately half a metre off the verandah floor.

The windows on each elevation overlooking the lagoon are casements with three lights in each leaf. A number of the west-facing windows have timber louvered shutters. A number of the doors opening out of the later wing extending east are french, and have low-waists and three lights in each leaf. All those opening out of the original west-facing wing are single leaf doors with low waists and four panels. Skillion hoods clad in corrugated iron and supported on simply carved timber brackets shelter the window and door opening east out of the bedroom in this wing. The sole window that opens onto this east-facing courtyard consists of a single leaf with six lights.

The walls and ceiling of the generously proportioned sitting room are lined with wide timber boards that have a dark appearance. The floorboards are not stained. A line of Archer family portraits remains along the long east-facing wall of the sitting room, resting above the picture rail. These have been a feature of the room since at least the 1930s and include a portrait of Julia Archer sent from Norway before the start of World War II. The room features an open fireplace on its short, south facing wall. It is decorated with the carved timber surrounds, chimney piece and fire screen completed by Daisy and Joan Archer, and Henry James King-Church. The surrounds and chimneypiece consist of stylized columns on either side of the hearth supporting a simple, narrow mantelpiece. The edges of the chimneypiece form a triangle topped by a roundel of carving. Above the mantel is a wide strip of carving divided into two panels with a narrow shelf above.

Other examples of the woodcarving efforts of Daisy and Joan Archer remain in the sitting room. A bookcase with carved panels separating curtains drawn across two books alcoves is located in the centre of the west-facing wall. The panels have semicircular ends and are carved with stylized foliage. A number of pieces of freestanding furniture also remain. They include a spinning chair, which has four turned and splayed legs and a narrow backrest fitted into a simple seat. Joan Archer's single chair for her husband, Alister, also still exists. Its four faces are solid. The side panels curve up toward the backrest and are topped with carved nodes. The seat and backrest are padded with leather. There is also a three-seater, pew-like chair positioned under the window opening onto the east-facing courtyard. Its four faces are solid carved timber. The backrest, seat and front panel are divided into three segments. A crest appears to occupy the central panel on the backrest.

The walls in the dining room are lined with wide vertical boards that are painted white. The ceiling joists are exposed and have a dark appearance that contrasts with the white boards behind. The internal walls of the two bedrooms are similarly framed and finished.

=== Garden ===
The garden extends to the south and west of the house down to the edge of the lagoon, containing both formal and informal sections. The focal point is a raised circular lawn approximately five metres in diameter and adjacent to the western wing. On the three remaining sides, it is flanked by raised garden beds retained behind dry-stone granite walls. These beds continue in front of the southern wing. Graveled pathways separate the raised beds and the central lawn. In its centre sits an upright length of petrified wood holding a sundial. Outside this area the planting scheme is more informal. On the west, beyond the relevant line of garden beds by approximately three metres, are located two bougainvillea covered arbours constructed from cut saplings and linking the formal area to the natural one by the water's edge. About three metres north of the north-western corner of the raised beds lies a slate grave marker inscribed with the name George Elliot and the date 1856. On the opposite corner of the garden bed arrangement, a stone-edged path leads to the boat shed and jetty.

Beyond the south-facing line of garden beds is a lawn area edged by azalea shrubbery. An overgrown metal windmill, about eight metres in height, stands approximately ten metres to the south of the south-west corner of verandah. At the eastern end of this line of beds is located a rough pergola also made from cut saplings over which bougainvillea has been trained. There is a similar structure adjacent to the south-east corner of the entry to the south-facing verandah. A timber pergola runs along the length of the west-facing verandah. It supports bougainvillea and sandpaper vine (Petrea volubis). The pergola's timber frame is founded on a raised rock garden planted with agapanthus. Timber stairs bring people down from the verandahs to the garden.

The garden supports as many as sixteen different varieties of bougainvillea, including: Mrs Butt (scarlet), Alton Downs (pinkish red), Louise Waltham (apricot pink) and Thomasii (deep pink). Other dominant species include frangipani (Plumeria rubra), royal palms (Roystonea regia) and Leichhardt trees (Nauclea orientalis) native to the Fitzroy region. A large stand of bamboo occupies a spot approximately ten metres to the south-east of that corner of the house. Further east from this by about another ten metres is a stand of Tamarind trees.

=== Guest Cottage ===
This simple cottage is located approximately twelve to fifteen metres from the northern end of the house. A narrow concrete path leads between it and the grassed courtyard of the house. The cottage is rectangular in plan and has a gable roof clad in corrugated iron. Timber stumps support the timber floor framing. A verandah approximately one and a half metres wide faces back toward the house and is accessed via a short flight of timber stairs. The cottage roof is supported at the outer verandah edge on simple timber posts. A timber top rail rests on a centred timber baluster. The verandah deck is clad in wide timber boards and the exterior walls are clad with weatherboards. A window on the short eastern facade is sheltered by a curved hood clad in corrugated iron and supported on a largely solid bracket. Two casement windows open onto the verandah and have two lights in each leaf. A single leaf door opens off this verandah. A fenceline composed of timber picket parts, the trunk of a mature tree and a section of posts and rails, runs between the north-east corner of the house and a point approximately two-thirds the way along the length of the cottage.

=== Boat House and Jetty ===
This small structure is located at the end of a pathway leading from the south-western corner of the raised garden bed enclosure to the edge of the lagoon. A rectangle approximately two by five metres in plan, the structure has a skillion roof clad in corrugated iron and supported on timber framing that is attached to large timber posts at the water's edge. The roof slopes away from the water. The wall facing back to the garden is clad in unpainted weatherboards, while the opposite one is open to the view. The short elevations facing west and east are made with cross-braced timber battens. The floor is lined with timber boards.

=== Detached Kitchen and Store ===
The detached kitchen and store building is located approximately five metres from the north-east corner of the house. Its length runs parallel to the south-facing wing of the house. It is essentially rectangular in plan, founded on very short timber stumps and sheltered by a gabled roof clad in corrugated iron. Verandahs extend along the north and south facing elevations of the building, the roofs of which are broken-backed extensions of the main roof. These have floors lined with timber boards. The local ground slopes gently to the north-east. A timber and chainwire fence runs between the eastern end of the house and a point approximately halfway along this building's southern face.

The remains of a brick fireplace and oven project out of the western facade and are separately sheltered under a skillion roof clad in corrugated iron. The store at the eastern end of the building forms a similar appendage. The exterior walls and gables, and parts of the fireplace extension are clad in painted weatherboards. The roofs at the verandah edges are supported on undecorated timber posts. Three board doors open onto the south-facing verandah of this building. A mature tree marks the entrance joined to the house by a concrete path. The store also has a door on this facade. Two six light fixed windows also feature on this facade.

On the interior, the hewn timber frame and the shingles that originally clad the roof are visible. The floors are lined with unfinished timber boards. The building is divided into a number of small rooms. A number of single skin interior walls appear to be clad in chamfer boards. There are also a number of board doors opening between rooms.

=== Office and Bookkeeper's Quarters ===
This building is sited approximately five metres directly east of the detached kitchen, along the entrance roadway. It is rectangular in plan, with its length running east to west. This structure is similar in form and materials to the main part of the kitchen, with verandahs facing south and north. Two short flights of timber stairs provide access to the south-facing verandah. The gable roof is supported at the verandah edge by undecorated timber posts. There are two corrugated iron water tanks adjacent to the western facade. At least two casement windows open onto the southern verandah. They have two lights in each leaf.

=== Carpenter and Blacksmith's Shop ===
This structure is sited approximately seven to ten metres further east from the office and bookkeeper's quarters described above. Rectangular in plan, it has a hipped roof clad in corrugated iron, the ridge of which runs from east to west. Its wall and roof framing members are made from rough hewn timber posts, in between which have been inserted some sections of vertical adzed timber slabs and some of corrugated iron. Its northern elevation is entirely open, with only the timber posts visible, while the short sides facing east and west are partly filled. The elevation facing south is entirely filled with timber slab and corrugated iron panels. The whole structure is leaning heavily. A Banyan Tree (Ficus bengalensis) stands adjacent to the south-eastern of this structure.

=== Vehicle/Machinery Shed ===
This structure is set between the office and the carpenter and blacksmith's shop described above, approximately five to seven metres back from the line they make on the roadway. It has a corrugated iron roof and its wall and roof framing are made of rough-hewn timber posts. Its south-facing elevation is largely open, with only the framing members visible. Its eastern face is clad, probably in weatherboards, and features a window.

Stables and Attached Cattle Yards The stables and the cattle yards attached to them are located approximately thirty to fifty metres further east along the entrance roadway. The stable building is sited in the south-eastern corner of the square shaped yards. It is rectangular in plan, with the long sides running parallel to the roadway. The roof is clad in corrugated iron. The yards are approximately twenty-five metres square. A number of trees line the yard fences.

=== Miscellaneous Shed/Building ===
A further structure is located approximately ten metres to the north of the kitchen building described above. It has a gabled roof clad in corrugated iron. In terms of form and materials it appears to be very similar to the Office and Bookkeeper's Quarters.

=== Tamarind Tree Avenue ===
The roadway leading between the entrance to the allotment off the Capricorn Highway on the eastern side of the property and the homestead's buildings and garden on the western side is lined by a series of mature Tamarind Trees. They appear to be planted approximately seven metres apart for the entire one kilometre course of the roadway.

== Heritage listing ==
Gracemere Homestead was listed on the Queensland Heritage Register on 21 October 1992 having satisfied the following criteria.

The place is important in demonstrating the evolution or pattern of Queensland's history.

The founding (early 1850s) and evolution of Gracemere Homestead is important in demonstrating the economic, political and social development of Central Queensland. The pioneering efforts of its first owners, David, Charles and William Archer, illustrate the pattern of non-indigenous settlement in colonial Queensland. The change from sheep to cattle is reflected at Gracemere Homestead in adjustments to its layout, depicting the economic evolution of the region. Its Hereford stud, one of the first in Queensland, played an important role in promoting the breed in many parts of the state. Responses to drought, flood and pests, as well as to changes in relevant markets and industries, are also reflected in the fabric of the place.

The place demonstrates rare, uncommon or endangered aspects of Queensland's cultural heritage.

The original wing of Gracemere Homestead, occupied since its construction in 1858, remains highly intact, which is rare for a structure of timber slab construction of this era in Queensland.

The place has potential to yield information that will contribute to an understanding of Queensland's history.

Due to the age and intactness of the place, in particular the house clad in iron bark slabs and pit-sawn timbers and the mature trees of the garden, Gracemere Homestead has the potential to yield information through historical and archaeological research that will contribute to an improved understanding of Queensland's history.

The place is important in demonstrating the principal characteristics of a particular class of cultural places.

The complex of buildings at Gracemere Homestead survives highly intact and is important in demonstrating the principal characteristics of an early pastoral homestead with its house and extensive sub-tropical garden, detached kitchen, offices and shops, and other sheds and yards. The variety of elements and the spatial relationship between them demonstrates the nature of early station life in Central Queensland. The materials of the house reflect the technology and skill involved in the various forms of construction used. Also the design, particularly of the slab-clad section, shows a consideration of passive cooling mechanisms or strategies in response to the sub-tropical climate, which continues to be practiced today.

The place is important because of its aesthetic significance.

The station buildings, including the house and its garden, are situated on a promontory on the eastern shore of a large perennial lagoon. The site has operated for over 150 years.

The place has a special association with the life or work of a particular person, group or organisation of importance in Queensland's history.

Gracemere Homestead has a particular association with the Archer family, which played a key role in the development of the pastoral industry in Central Queensland. They were also keenly involved in public and community affairs. In addition to the design and construction of the original house being supervised by Colin Archer who went on to have an internationally renowned career as a naval architect, wood carved internal fittings and furnishings, which contribute significantly to the atmosphere and history of the house, were completed by Daisy and Joan Archer. The garden conceived of and executed by Charles and William respectively has been tended by successive Archer generations.
