= Lardal Municipality =

Former municipality in Vestfold, Norway

Lardal Municipality Lardal kommune
- Former municipality
- Lardal herred (historic name)
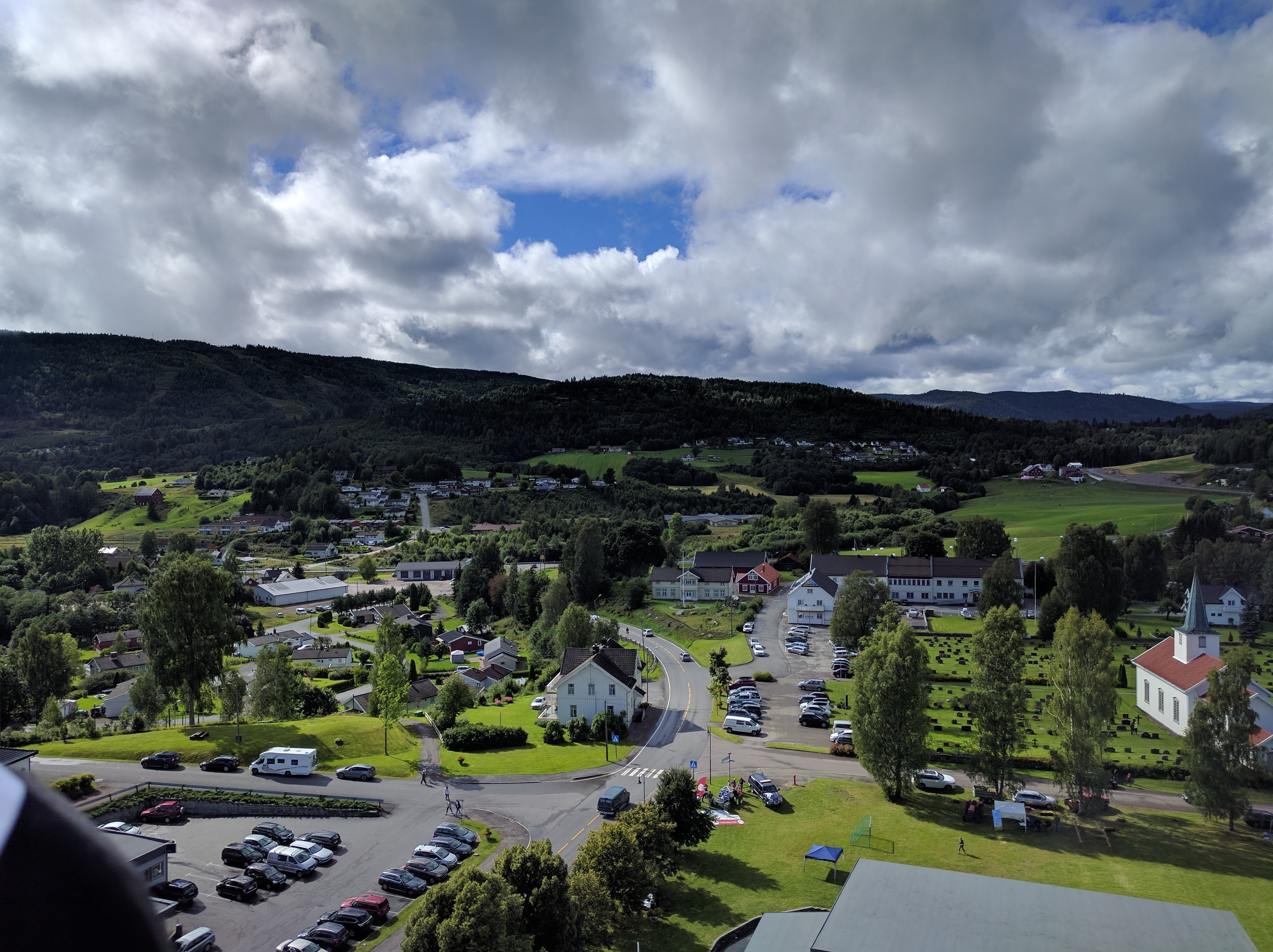
- View of the Svarstad area

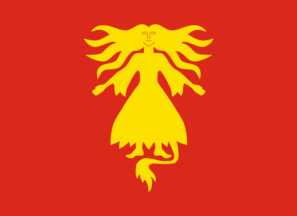
- Flag Coat of arms

- Vestfold within Norway

- Lardal within Vestfold
- Coordinates: 59°22′56″N 9°54′19″E
- Country: Norway
- County: Vestfold
- Established: 1 Jan 1838
  - Created as: Formannskapsdistrikt
- Disestablished: 1 Jan 2018
  - Succeeded by: Larvik Municipality
- Administrative centre: Svarstad

Government
  - Mayor (2015–2017): Knut Olav Omholt (Sp)

Area (upon dissolution)
  - Total: 277.69 km^{2} (107.22 sq mi)
  - Land: 270.69 km^{2} (104.51 sq mi)
  - Water: 7 km^{2} (2.7 sq mi) 2.5%
  - Rank: #287 in Norway
- Highest elevation (Pikstein): 622.04 m (2,040.8 ft)

Population (2017)
  - Total: 2,475
  - Rank: #301 in Norway
  - Density: 9.1/km^{2} (24/sq mi)
  - Change (10 years): ▲ +2.3%
- Demonym: Lardøling

Official language
  - Norwegian form: Bokmål
- Time zone: UTC+01:00 (CET)
  - Summer (DST): UTC+02:00 (CEST)
- ISO 3166 code: NO-0728

Lardal (Urban East Norwegian pronunciation: [ˈlɑ̂rdɑːɫ]; locally [²laːdæːɽ]) is a former municipality in Vestfold county, Norway. The 278-square-kilometre (107 sq mi) municipality existed from 1838 until its dissolution in 2018. The area is now part of Larvik Municipality. The administrative centre was the village of Svarstad. The village of Steinsholt was also located in the municipality.

Prior to its dissolution in 2017, the 277.69-square-kilometre (107.22 sq mi) municipality was the 287th largest by area out of the 426 municipalities in Norway. Lardal Municipality was the 301st most populous municipality in Norway with a population of about 2,475. The municipality's population density was 9.1 inhabitants per square kilometre (24/sq mi) and its population had increased by 2.3% over the previous 10-year period.

== General information ==
=== Administrative history ===
The formannskapsdistrikt law of 1837 created a system of local government in Norway by establishing each town (ladested or kjøpstad) and each Church of Norway prestegjeld as a civil municipality. On 1 January 1838, Laurdal prestegjeld was established as Laurdal Municipality (later spelled Lardal). Initially, the municipality included the three parishes of Svarstad, Styrvoll, and Hem.

On 1 January 1983, the small unpopulated Bergan area (just south of Steinsholt) was transferred to Lardal Municipality from the neighboring Hedrum Municipality. On 9 January 1987, another unpopulated area was transferred to Lardal Municipality from the neighboring Hedrum Municipality.

On 1 January 2018, Lardal Municipality (population: 2,475) was dissolved and merged with Larvik Municipality (population: 44,082) to form an enlarged Larvik Municipality.

=== Name ===
The municipality is named after the old Lardal prestegjeld. The prestegjeld was named after the Lardal valley (Old Norse: Lagardalr). The first element is the genitive case of lǫgr which means "water" or "river" (referring to the local river Numedalslågen). The last element is dalr which means "valley" or "dale". Prior to 1889, the name was spelled "Laurdal". In 1889, the spelling was changed to "Lardal".

=== Coat of arms ===
The coat of arms was granted on 17 July 1992. The official blazon is "Gules, a hulder Or" (Norwegian: I rødt ei gull hulder). This means the arms have a red field (background) and the charge is a hulder. The hulder has a tincture of Or which means it is commonly colored yellow, but if it is made out of metal, then gold is used. The hulder is a part of old Scandinavian folklore. This was chosen to represent the large forested areas in Lardal that were said to be inhabited by hulder. The arms were designed by Arvid Steen. The municipal flag has the same design as the coat of arms.

=== Churches ===
The Church of Norway had three parishes (sokn) within Lardal Municipality. At the time of the municipal dissolution, it was part of the Lardal prestegjeld and the Larvik prosti (deanery) in the Diocese of Tunsberg.

Churches in Larvik
Parish (sokn)	Church name	Location of the church	Year built
Hem	Hem Church	Hem	c. 1100
Styrvoll	Styrvoll Church	Styrvoll	c. 1150
Svarstad	Svarstad Church	Svarstad	1657

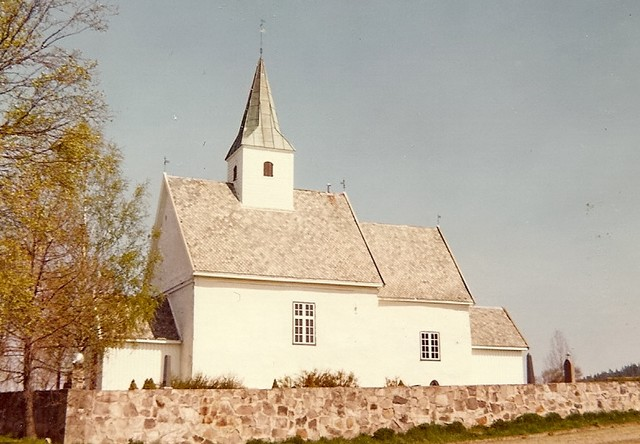
Hem church

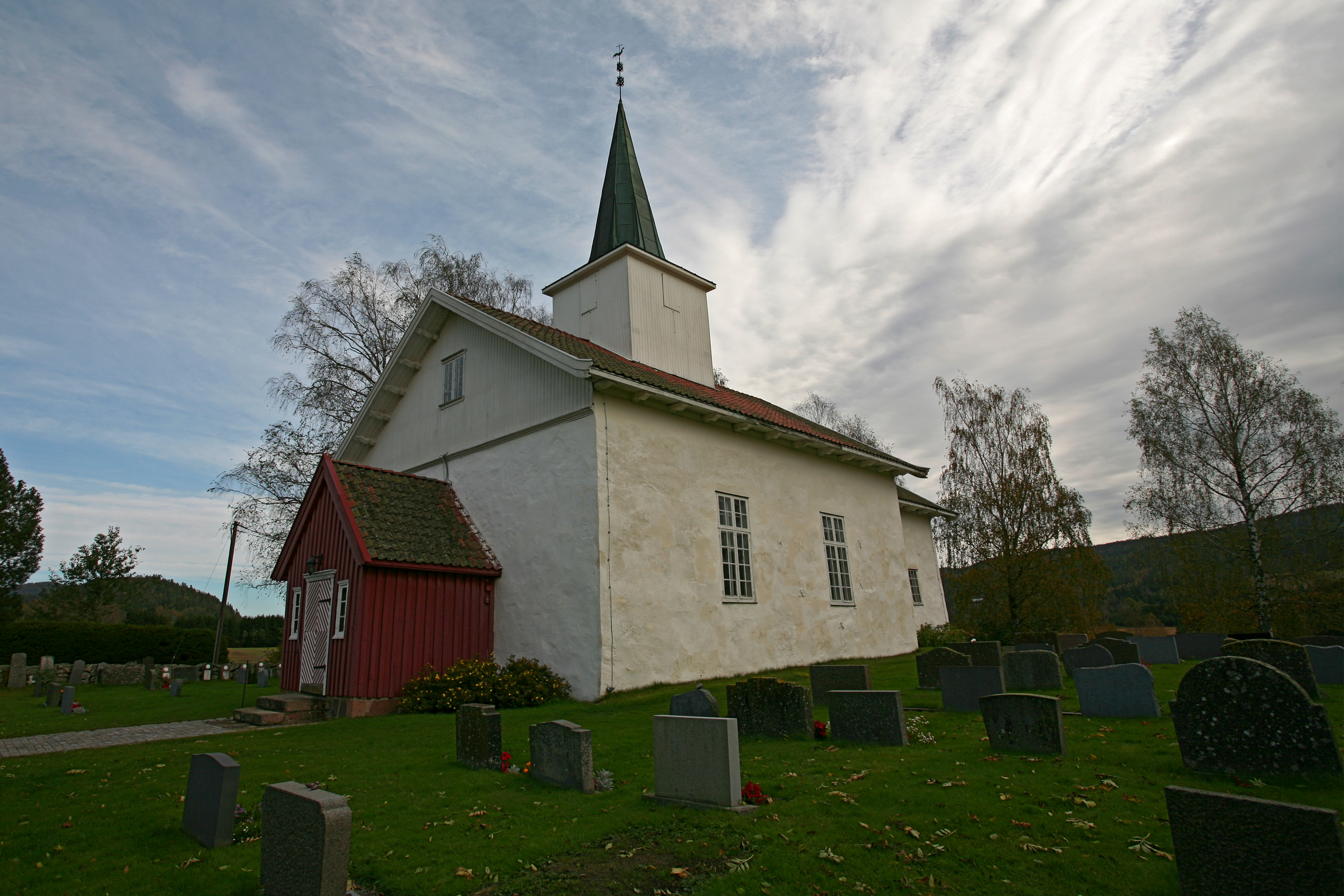
Styrvoll church

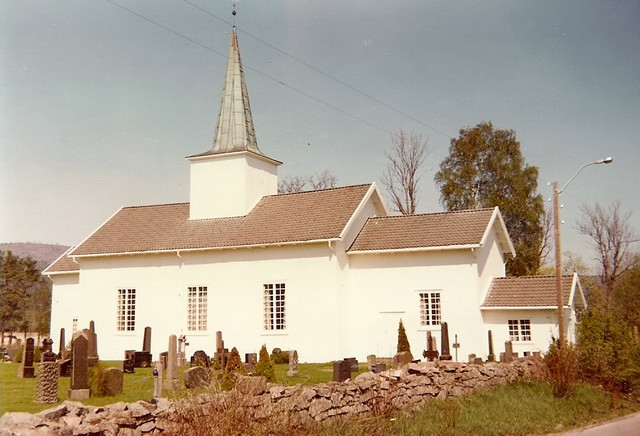
Svarstad church

== Geography ==
The municipality was located in the Lågendalen valley, the middle part of the valley that follows the river Numedalslågen. The highest point in the municipality was the 622.04-metre (2,040.8 ft) tall mountain Pikstein, located on the border with Kongsberg Municipality in Buskerud county.

Kongsberg Municipality (in Buskerud county) was located to the north, Hof Municipality was located to the northeast, Re Municipality was located to the east, Andebu Municipality was located to the southeast, Hedrum Municipality was located to the south, and Siljan Municipality (in Telemark county) was located to the west.

== Government ==
Number of minorities (1st and 2nd generation) in Lardal by country of origin in 2017
Ancestry	Number
Poland	41
Lithuania	35
Bosnia	22

While it existed, Lardal Municipality was responsible for primary education (through 10th grade), outpatient health services, senior citizen services, welfare and other social services, zoning, economic development, and municipal roads and utilities. The municipality was governed by a municipal council of directly elected representatives. The mayor was indirectly elected by a vote of the municipal council. The municipality was under the jurisdiction of the Larvik District Court and the Agder Court of Appeal.

=== Municipal council ===
The municipal council (Kommunestyre) of Lardal Municipality was made up of representatives that were elected to four year terms. The tables below show the historical composition of the council by political party.

Lardal kommunestyre 2015–2017
Party name (in Norwegian)	Number of representatives
Labour Party (Arbeiderpartiet)	3
Progress Party (Fremskrittspartiet)	1
Conservative Party (Høyre)	3
Centre Party (Senterpartiet)	4
Liberal Party (Venstre)	3
Lardal Cross-Party List (Lardal Tverrpolitiske Liste)	3
Total number of members:	17
Note: On 1 January 2018, Lardal Municipality became part of Larvik Municipality.

Lardal kommunestyre 2011–2015
Party name (in Norwegian)	Number of representatives
Labour Party (Arbeiderpartiet)	5
Progress Party (Fremskrittspartiet)	2
Conservative Party (Høyre)	4
Christian Democratic Party (Kristelig Folkeparti)	1
Centre Party (Senterpartiet)	4
Liberal Party (Venstre)	1
Total number of members:	17

Lardal kommunestyre 2007–2011
Party name (in Norwegian)	Number of representatives
Labour Party (Arbeiderpartiet)	7
Progress Party (Fremskrittspartiet)	2
Conservative Party (Høyre)	2
Christian Democratic Party (Kristelig Folkeparti)	1
Centre Party (Senterpartiet)	3
Socialist Left Party (Sosialistisk Venstreparti)	1
Liberal Party (Venstre)	1
Total number of members:	17

Lardal kommunestyre 2003–2007
Party name (in Norwegian)	Number of representatives
Labour Party (Arbeiderpartiet)	6
Progress Party (Fremskrittspartiet)	2
Conservative Party (Høyre)	3
Centre Party (Senterpartiet)	5
Socialist Left Party (Sosialistisk Venstreparti)	1
Total number of members:	17

Lardal kommunestyre 1999–2003
Party name (in Norwegian)	Number of representatives
Labour Party (Arbeiderpartiet)	7
Progress Party (Fremskrittspartiet)	3
Conservative Party (Høyre)	3
Centre Party (Senterpartiet)	6
Socialist Left Party (Sosialistisk Venstreparti)	1
Liberal Party (Venstre)	1
Total number of members:	21

Lardal kommunestyre 1995–1999
Party name (in Norwegian)	Number of representatives
Labour Party (Arbeiderpartiet)	10
Progress Party (Fremskrittspartiet)	1
Conservative Party (Høyre)	2
Centre Party (Senterpartiet)	6
Socialist Left Party (Sosialistisk Venstreparti)	1
Liberal Party (Venstre)	1
Total number of members:	21

Lardal kommunestyre 1991–1995
Party name (in Norwegian)	Number of representatives
Labour Party (Arbeiderpartiet)	9
Progress Party (Fremskrittspartiet)	1
Conservative Party (Høyre)	2
Centre Party (Senterpartiet)	4
Liberal Party (Venstre)	1
Total number of members:	17

Lardal kommunestyre 1987–1991
Party name (in Norwegian)	Number of representatives
Labour Party (Arbeiderpartiet)	9
Conservative Party (Høyre)	2
Liberal Party (Venstre)	1
Joint list of the Centre Party (Senterpartiet) and the Christian Democratic Party (Kristelig Folkeparti)	5
Total number of members:	17

Lardal kommunestyre 1983–1987
Party name (in Norwegian)	Number of representatives
Labour Party (Arbeiderpartiet)	9
Conservative Party (Høyre)	2
Centre Party (Senterpartiet)	6
Total number of members:	17

Lardal kommunestyre 1979–1983
Party name (in Norwegian)	Number of representatives
Labour Party (Arbeiderpartiet)	8
Conservative Party (Høyre)	3
Christian Democratic Party (Kristelig Folkeparti)	1
Centre Party (Senterpartiet)	5
Total number of members:	17

Lardal kommunestyre 1975–1979
Party name (in Norwegian)	Number of representatives
Labour Party (Arbeiderpartiet)	8
Conservative Party (Høyre)	2
Christian Democratic Party (Kristelig Folkeparti)	1
Centre Party (Senterpartiet)	5
Joint list of the Liberal Party (Venstre) and New People's Party (Nye Folkepartiet)	1
Total number of members:	17

Lardal kommunestyre 1971–1975
Party name (in Norwegian)	Number of representatives
Labour Party (Arbeiderpartiet)	9
Conservative Party (Høyre)	2
Christian Democratic Party (Kristelig Folkeparti)	1
Centre Party (Senterpartiet)	4
Liberal Party (Venstre)	1
Total number of members:	17

Lardal kommunestyre 1967–1971
Party name (in Norwegian)	Number of representatives
Labour Party (Arbeiderpartiet)	10
Conservative Party (Høyre)	2
Centre Party (Senterpartiet)	4
Liberal Party (Venstre)	1
Total number of members:	17

Lardal kommunestyre 1963–1967
Party name (in Norwegian)	Number of representatives
Labour Party (Arbeiderpartiet)	10
Conservative Party (Høyre)	2
Centre Party (Senterpartiet)	4
Liberal Party (Venstre)	1
Total number of members:	17

Lardal herredsstyre 1959–1963
Party name (in Norwegian)	Number of representatives
Labour Party (Arbeiderpartiet)	9
Conservative Party (Høyre)	1
Centre Party (Senterpartiet)	5
Liberal Party (Venstre)	1
Local List(s) (Lokale lister)	1
Total number of members:	17

Lardal herredsstyre 1955–1959
Party name (in Norwegian)	Number of representatives
Labour Party (Arbeiderpartiet)	11
Conservative Party (Høyre)	1
Farmers' Party (Bondepartiet)	4
Liberal Party (Venstre)	1
Total number of members:	17

Lardal herredsstyre 1951–1955
Party name (in Norwegian)	Number of representatives
Labour Party (Arbeiderpartiet)	9
Conservative Party (Høyre)	2
Farmers' Party (Bondepartiet)	4
Liberal Party (Venstre)	1
Total number of members:	16

Lardal herredsstyre 1947–1951
Party name (in Norwegian)	Number of representatives
Labour Party (Arbeiderpartiet)	9
Joint list of the Liberal Party (Venstre) and the Radical People's Party (Radikale Folkepartiet)	1
Joint List(s) of Non-Socialist Parties (Borgerlige Felleslister)	6
Total number of members:	16

Lardal herredsstyre 1945–1947
Party name (in Norwegian)	Number of representatives
Labour Party (Arbeiderpartiet)	9
Joint list of the Liberal Party (Venstre) and the Radical People's Party (Radikale Folkepartiet)	1
Joint List(s) of Non-Socialist Parties (Borgerlige Felleslister)	6
Total number of members:	16

Lardal herredsstyre 1937–1941*
Party name (in Norwegian)	Number of representatives
Labour Party (Arbeiderpartiet)	8
Farmers' Party (Bondepartiet)	2
Joint List(s) of Non-Socialist Parties (Borgerlige Felleslister)	6
Total number of members:	16
Note: Due to the German occupation of Norway during World War II, no elections were held for new municipal councils until after the war ended in 1945.

=== Mayors ===
The mayor (Norwegian: ordfører) of Lardal Municipality was the political leader of the municipality and the chairperson of the municipal council. The following people have held this position:

- 1838–1842: C.F. Blehr
- 1842–1845: Engebret L. Sverkholt
- 1845–1852: Jacob Schjerven
- 1852–1856: Nils Hem
- 1856–1861: Jacob Schjerven
- 1861–1863: K. Olafsen
- 1863–1865: Nils Hem
- 1865–1867: Jacob Schjerven
- 1867–1871: M.O. Aschjem
- 1871–1873: Christian Smukkestad
- 1873–1881: H.J. Aschjem
- 1881–1884: Halvor L. Sogn
- 1884–1886: Gullik Hogstvedt
- 1886–1897: O.J. Schjerven
- 1897–1898: M.O. Aschjem
- 1898–1901: Gullik Hogstvedt
- 1901–1907: Rasmus Lie
- 1907–1910: J. Stensholt
- 1910–1916: Olaf G. Hogstvedt
- 1920–1922: Nils Jakob Schjerven (H)
- 1923–1928: Hans J. Lie
- 1929–1931: Nils Jakob Schjerven (H)
- 1934–1940: Halvor Sogn
- 1945–1945: Halvor Sogn
- 1946–1951: Syvert H. Lie
- 1952–1975: Nefton S. Melås
- 1976–1981: Tjodolf Hoff (Sp)
- 1984–1987: Borger Steinsholt (Ap)
- 1987–1992: Dag Terje Andersen (Ap)
- 1992–1998: Dagfinn Gjerden (Ap)
- 1998–2003: Rune Høiseth (Ap)
- 2003–2007: Nils Røsholt (Sp)
- 2007–2015: Liv Grinde (Ap)
- 2015–2017: Knut Olav Omholt (Ap)

== See also ==
- List of former municipalities of Norway
