= Rosholt =

Rosholt may refer to:

- Rosholt (surname)
- Rosholt, Wisconsin, a town in Portage County, Wisconsin
- Rosholt, South Dakota, a town in Roberts County, South Dakota
