= Coat of arms of Lardal =

The coat of arms of Lardal was approved on 17 July 1992 and is a gold Hulder on a red field. The flag was at the same time approved as a yellow hulder on a red field. Both the coat of arms and flag were designed by the artist Arvid Sveen. Blazon: Gules, a Huldra Ore, centered.

The huldra is one of the members of the underworld you might encounter when wandering in the wilderness according to Norwegian folklore. She is stunningly beautiful, except for her cow tail, but might lure you into the underworld.

Large areas of the municipality were forest and wilderness and there are many local tales of encounters with the mythical huldra among the inhabitants of Lardal. The area and the huldra are said to share the characteristics of wildness and mysteriousness.
