= Rosholt (surname) =

Rosholt is a surname. Notable people with the surname include:

- Jake Rosholt, professional mixed martial artist and former collegiate amateur wrestler
- Jared Rosholt, professional mixed martial artist and former collegiate amateur wrestler
- Jerry Rosholt, author and historian
- Nils Røsholt, Norwegian politician
- John Gilbert Rosholt, for whom Rosholt, Wisconsin, United States is named. He built the first sawmill in the village in 1884.
- Julius Rosholt, for whom Rosholt, South Dakota, United States is named. He was credited with bringing the railroad to town in 1913.
