= Svarstad =

Village in Larvik, Norway

- Village
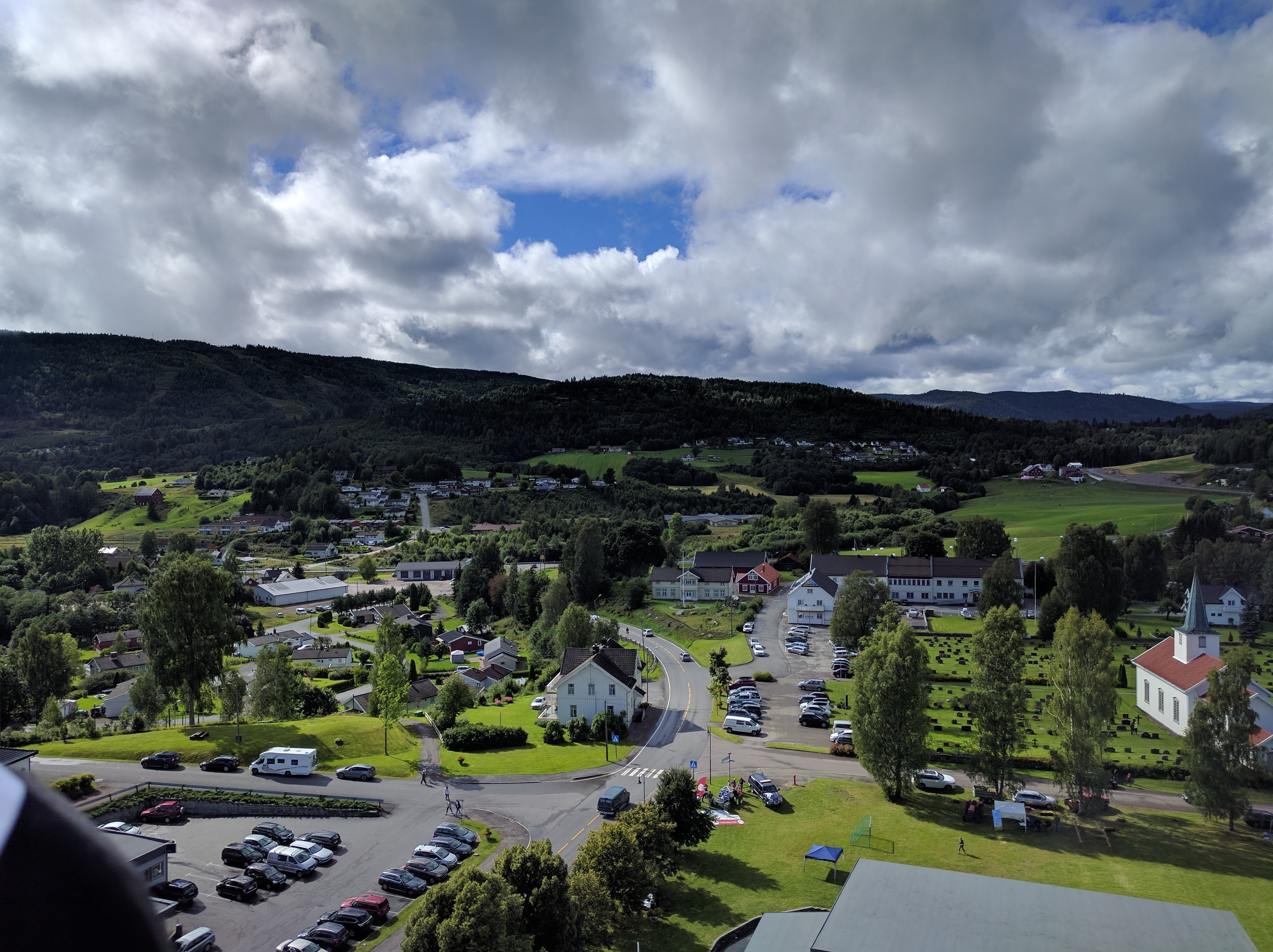
- View of the village
- Interactive map of Svarstad
- Coordinates: 59.40168°N 9.96144°E
- Country: Norway
- Region: Eastern Norway
- County: Vestfold
- District: Vestfold
- Municipality: Larvik Municipality

Area
  - Total: 0.67 km^{2} (0.26 sq mi)
- Elevation: 72 m (236 ft)

Population (2026)
  - Total: 669
  - Density: 999/km^{2} (2,590/sq mi)
- Time zone: UTC+01:00 (CET)
  - Summer (DST): UTC+02:00 (CEST)
- Post Code: 3275 Svarstad

- Svarstad is a village in Larvik Municipality in Vestfold county, Norway. The village is located along the river Numedalslågen, approximately 46 kilometres (29 mi) north of the town of Larvik and about 11 kilometres (6.8 mi) south of the village of Hvittingfoss in Kongsberg Municipality (in Buskerud county).

The 0.67-square-kilometre (170-acre) village has a population (2026) of 669 and a population density of 999 inhabitants per square kilometre (2,590/sq mi).

Svarstad Church (built in 1657) is located in the village. Holemyra is a small forested area located on the east side of Svarstad. It is a popular picnic and hiking area for local residents. The Svarstad ski center is located just west of Svarstad. It has several ski slopes for both children and adults.

== History ==
The village was the administrative centre of the old Lardal Municipality which existed from 1838 until 2018 when it became part of Larvik Municipality.
