= Nils Røsholt =

Norwegian politician (born 1949)

Nils Røsholt (born 27 May 1949) is a Norwegian politician for the Centre Party.

He served as a deputy representative to the Norwegian Parliament from Vestfold during the term 1993–1997.

On the local level Røsholt was the mayor of Lardal Municipality from 2003 to 2007.
