= Svarstad Church =

Church in Vestfold, Norway

- Svarstad kirke / Lardal kirke
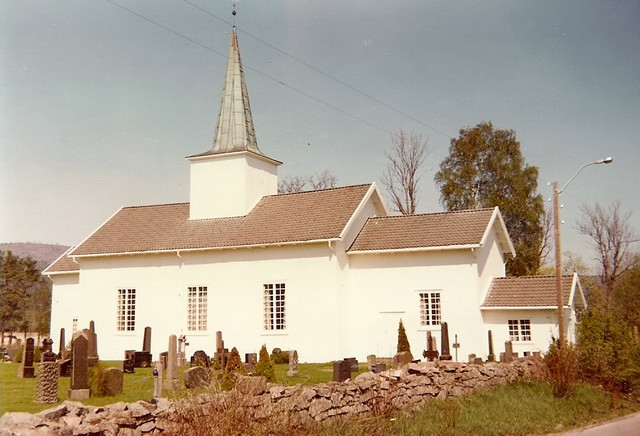
- View of the church
- Svarstad Church
- 59°24′09″N 9°57′40″E
- Location: Larvik Municipality, Vestfold
- Country: Norway
- Denomination: Church of Norway
- Previous denomination: Catholic Church
- Churchmanship: Evangelical Lutheran

History
- Status: Parish church
- Founded: 12th century
- Consecrated: 1657

Architecture
- Functional status: Active
- Architectural type: Long church
- Completed: 1657 (369 years ago)

Specifications
- Capacity: 220
- Materials: Wood

Administration
- Diocese: Tunsberg
- Deanery: Larvik prosti
- Parish: Lardal
- Norwegian Cultural Heritage Site
- Type: Church
- Status: Automatically protected
- ID: 117708

Svarstad Church (Norwegian: Svarstad kirke or Lardal kirke) is a parish church of the Church of Norway in Larvik Municipality in Vestfold county, Norway. It is located in the village of Svarstad. It is one of the churches for the Lardal parish which is part of the Larvik prosti (deanery) in the Diocese of Tunsberg. The white, wooden church was built in a long church design in 1657 using plans drawn up by an unknown architect. The church seats about 220 people.

== History ==
The earliest existing historical records of the church date back to the year 1359, but the church was not built that year. It is said that the first church was a wooden stave church and it may have been built around the year 1200. That church was dedicated to St. Olav. Two of the decorative portal planks from this church have been preserved at the Museum of Cultural History, Oslo for a long time. The old church had a fire in 1392 and it was either repaired or completely rebuilt in 1395. By the end of the 17th century, the church was considered to be far too small for the parish. In 1651, a builder was hired to enlarge the church, but it was ultimately decided to build a new building on the same site. The new church was consecrated in 1657. The new building was a wooden long church with a rectangular nave and a smaller chancel on the east end. The church was owned by the Count of Larvik until it was sold to the congregation in 1764.

In 1814, this church served as an election church (Norwegian: valgkirke). Together with more than 300 other parish churches across Norway, it was a polling station for elections to the 1814 Norwegian Constituent Assembly which wrote the Constitution of Norway. This was Norway's first national elections. Each church parish was a constituency that elected people called "electors" who later met together in each county to elect the representatives for the assembly that was to meet at Eidsvoll Manor later that year.

In 1866-1867, the church was renovated. The whole roof was rebuilt and a new tower on the nave roof was built. This renovation also included the construction of a small sacristy built on the east end of the chancel and a church porch on the west end of the nave.

== See also ==
- List of churches in Tunsberg
