= Hem Church =

Church in Vestfold, Norway

- Hem kirke
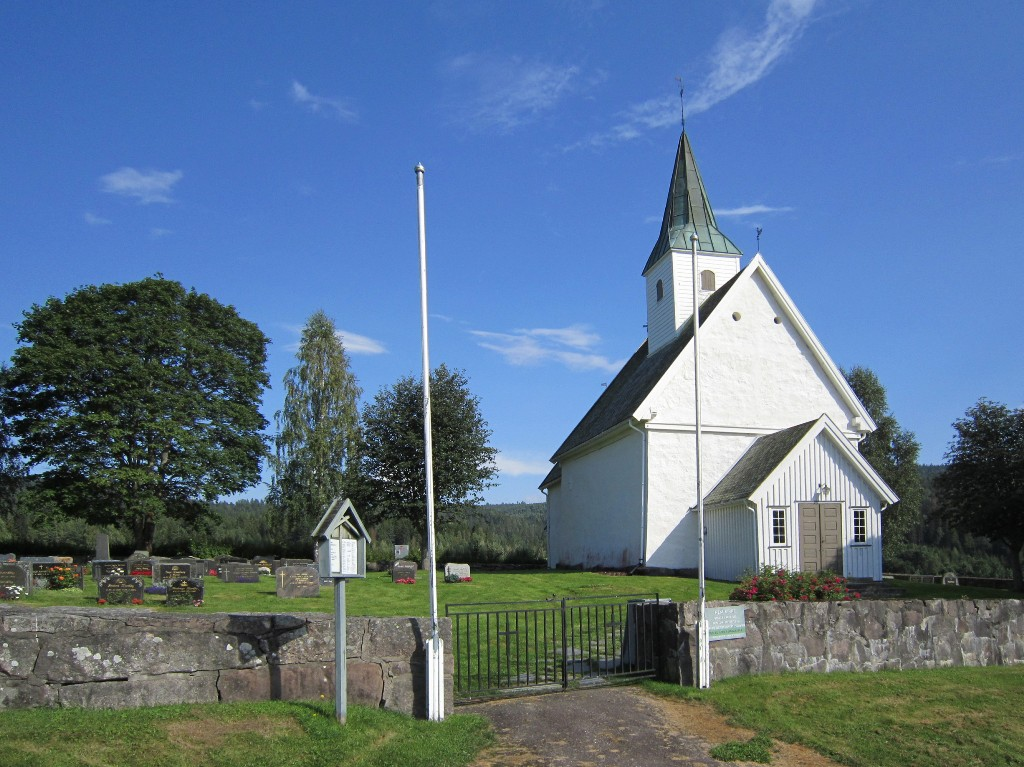
- View of the church
- Hem Church
- 59°25′36″N 10°01′13″E
- Location: Larvik Municipality, Vestfold
- Country: Norway
- Denomination: Church of Norway
- Previous denomination: Catholic Church
- Churchmanship: Evangelical Lutheran

History
- Status: Parish church
- Founded: c. 1200
- Consecrated: c. 1200

Architecture
- Functional status: Active
- Architectural type: Long church
- Style: Romanesque
- Completed: c. 1200 (826 years ago)

Specifications
- Capacity: 90
- Materials: Stone

Administration
- Diocese: Tunsberg
- Deanery: Larvik prosti
- Parish: Lardal
- Norwegian Cultural Heritage Site
- Type: Church
- Status: Automatically protected
- ID: 84542

Hem Church (Norwegian: Hem kirke) is a parish church of the Church of Norway in Larvik Municipality in Vestfold county, Norway. It is located in the village of Hem. It is one of the churches for the Lardal parish which is part of the Larvik prosti (deanery) in the Diocese of Tunsberg. The white, stone church was built in a long church design during the 12th century using plans drawn up by an unknown architect. The church seats about 90 people.

== History ==
The earliest existing historical records of the church date back to the year 1392, but the church was not necessarily built that year. The original part of the building was possibly built sometime around the year 1200, although the church presently uses 1392 as the year of its founding (celebrating its 600th anniversary in 1992). In 1992, dendrochronological dating was carried out to determine the age of the church, but it was inconclusive. The stone church was initially built with a rectangular nave and a smaller, rectangular chancel with a lower roofline. It was built in a Romanesque style, typically seen in churches built in the 12th and early 13th centuries in Norway. The building is constructed of stone, with the walls measuring about 120 centimetres (47 in) thick. Later, a wooden church porch was built at the main entrance. Extensive repairs were carried out in 1686 (a wall and a new tower on top of the nave, and second floor seating galleries in the nave). In 1932, a sacristy was built on the south side of the chancel. In 1951, the sacristy was taken down and rebuilt on the east end of the chancel.

The church was owned by the county of Jarlsberg from 1673 to 1766, when it was bought by some farmers in the village of Hem. In 1913, ownership of the church was transferred to the parish.

== Media gallery ==
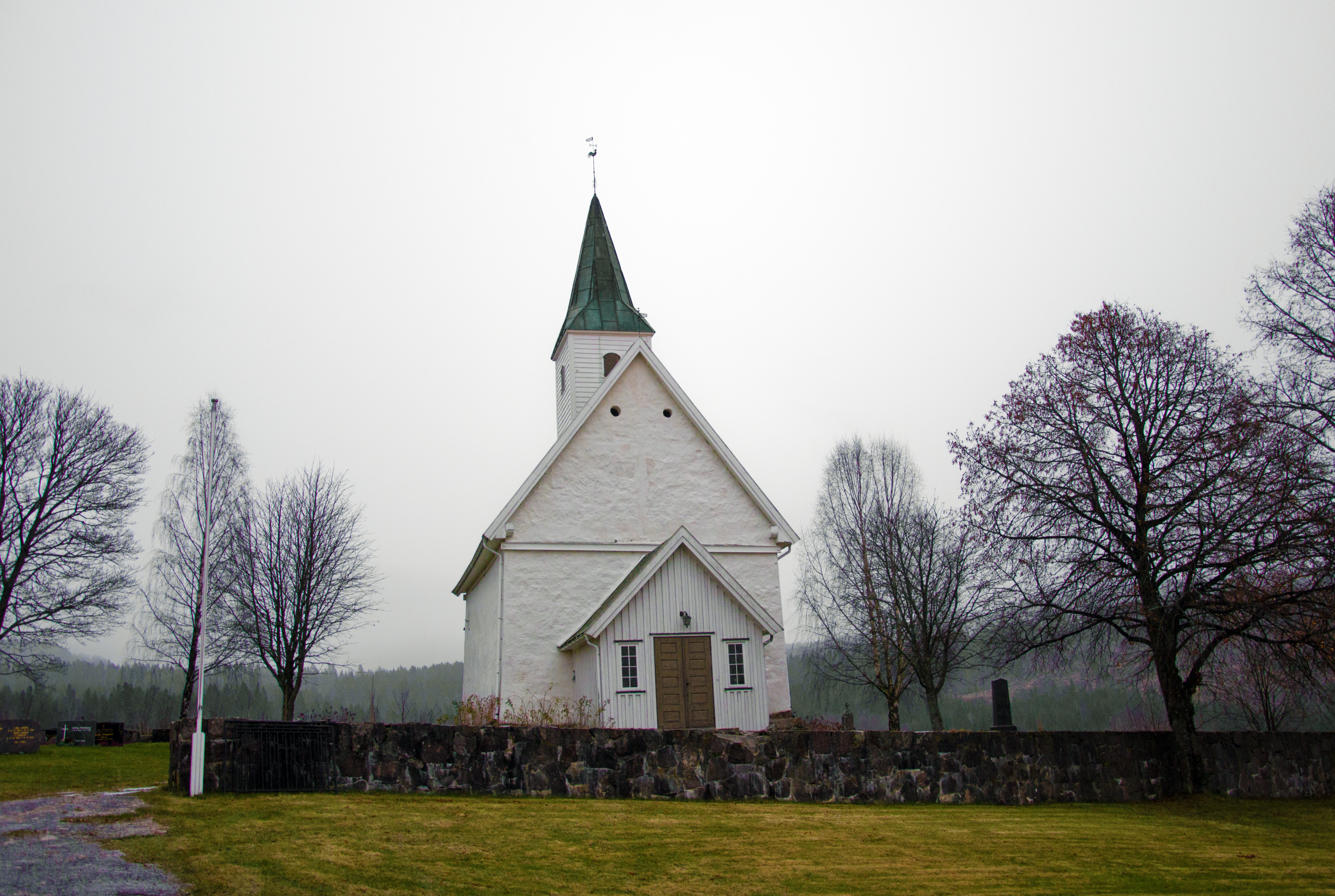

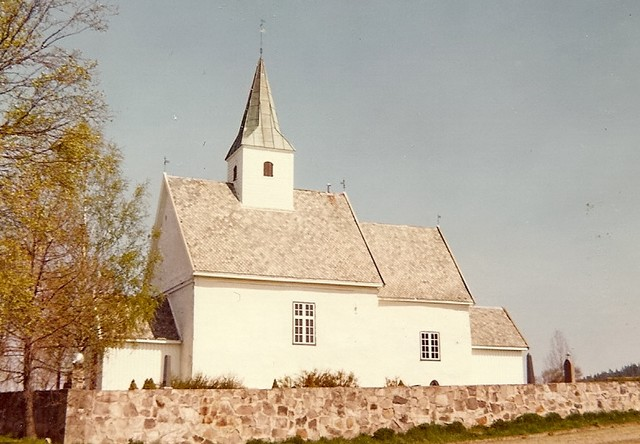

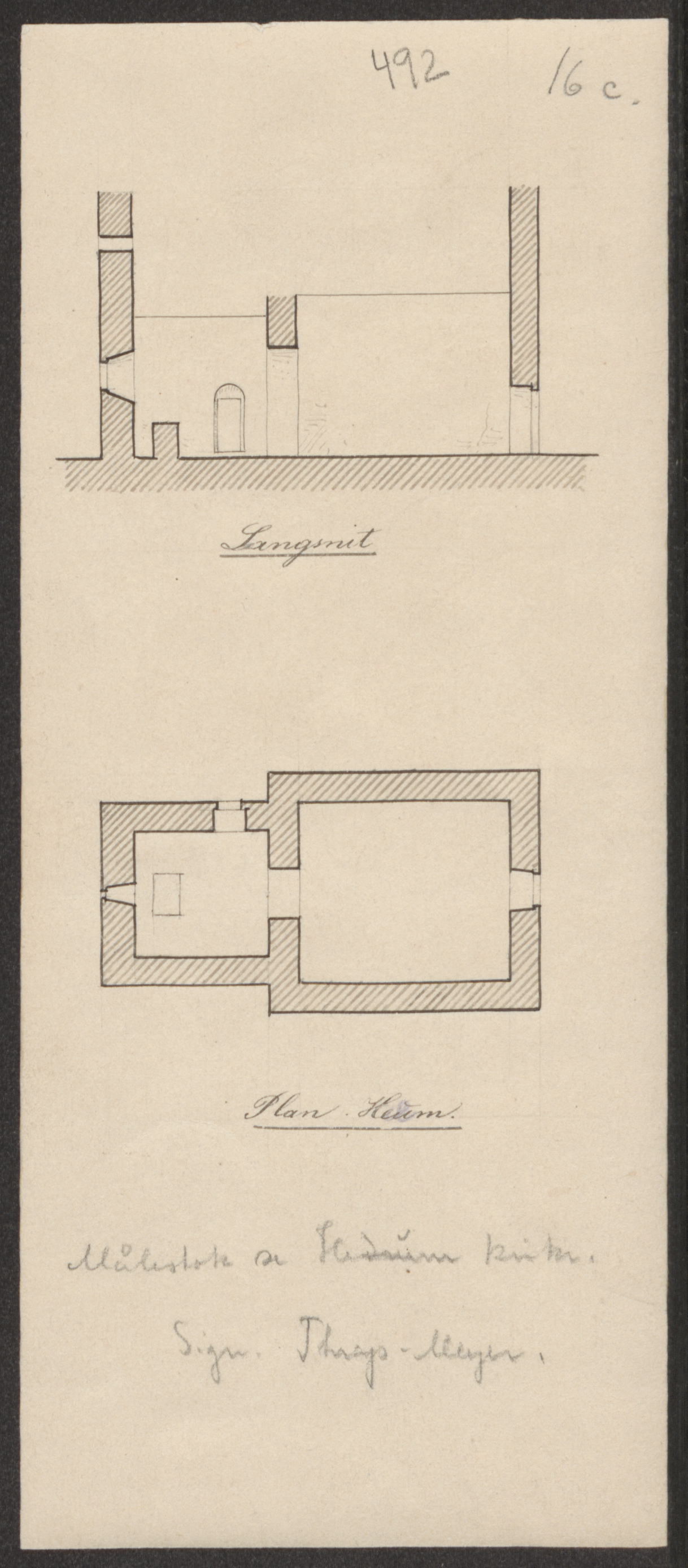

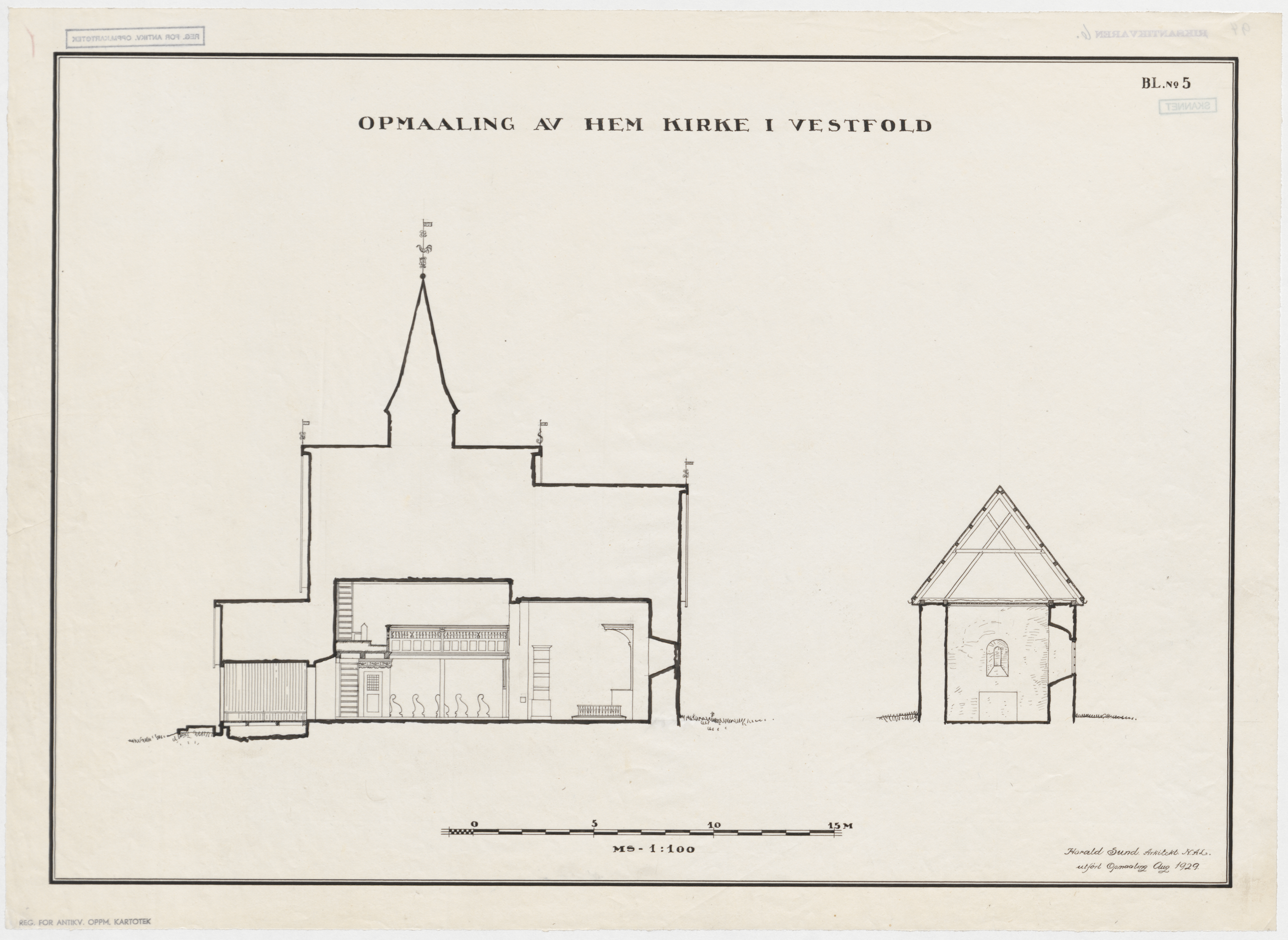

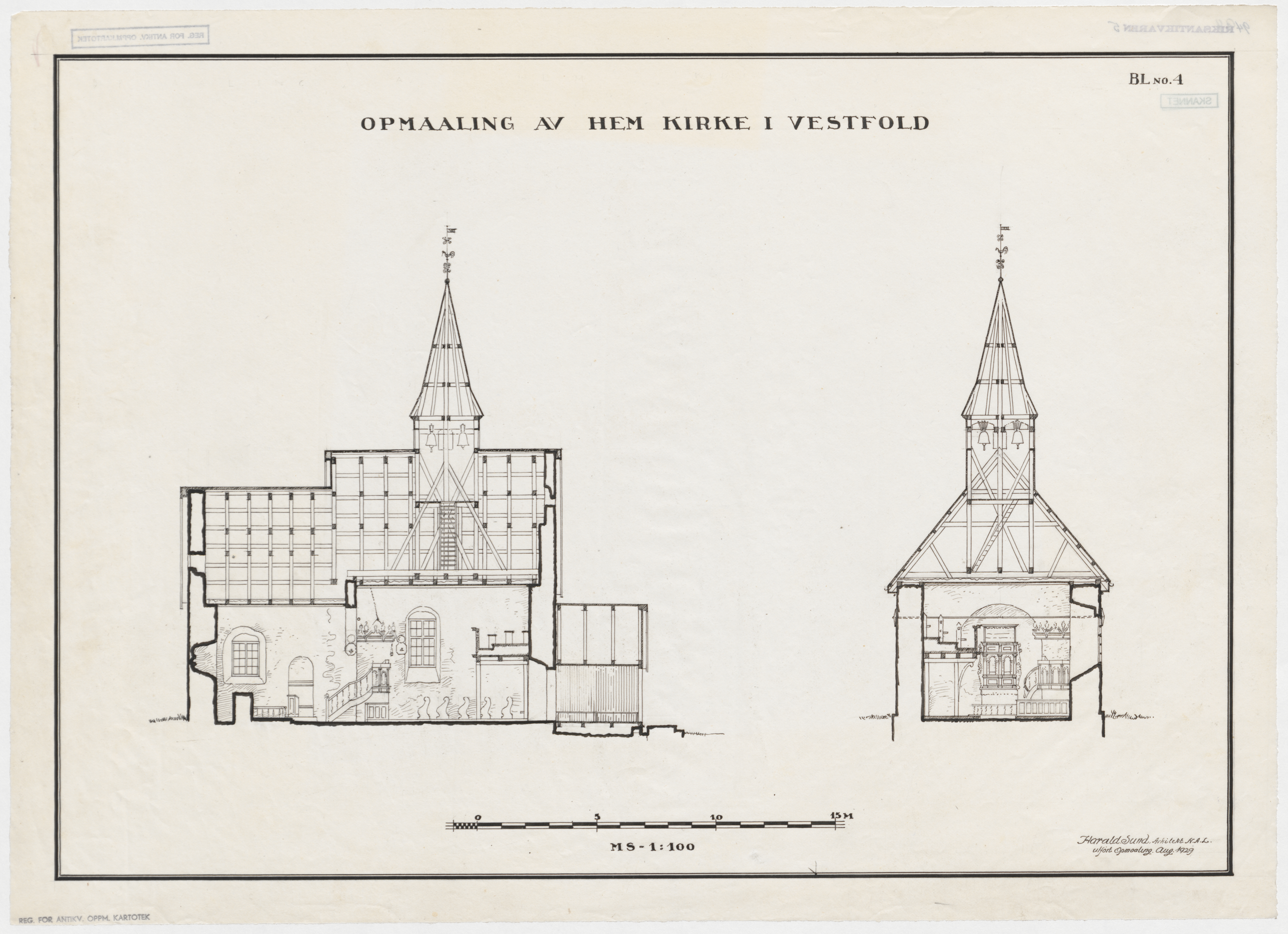

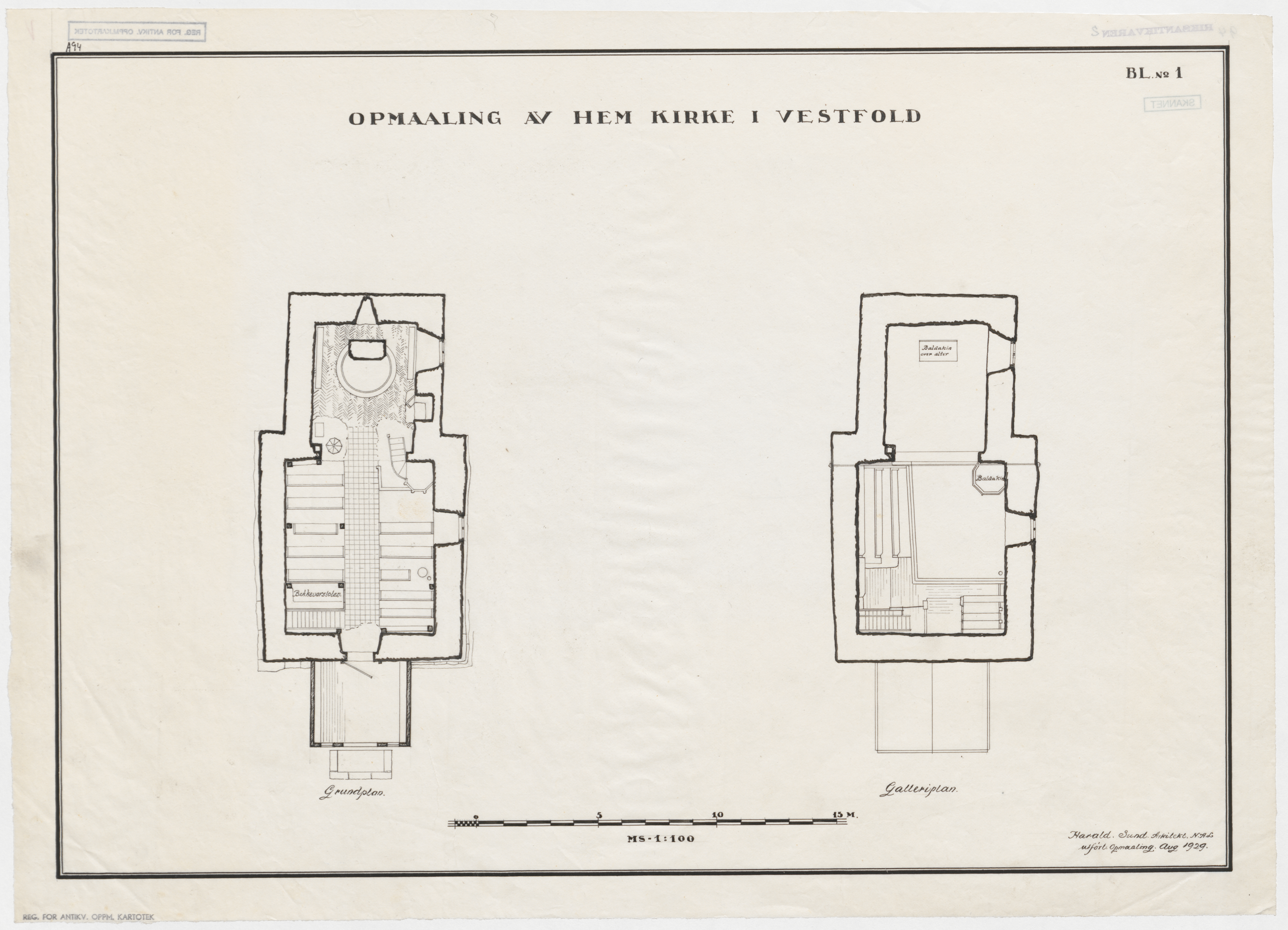

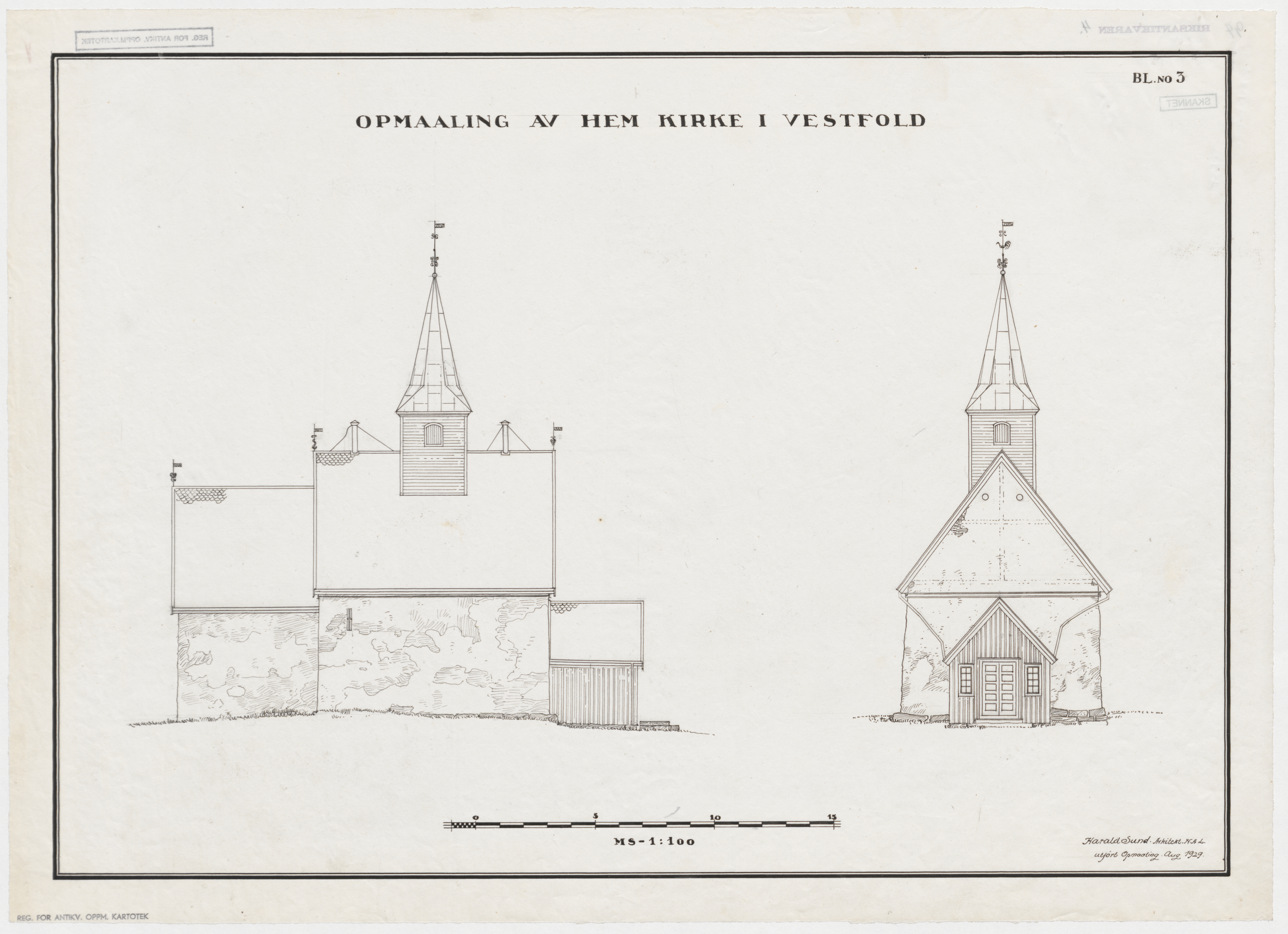

== See also ==
- List of churches in Tunsberg
