= Vestfold =

County in Norway

Vestfold County Vestfold fylke
- County
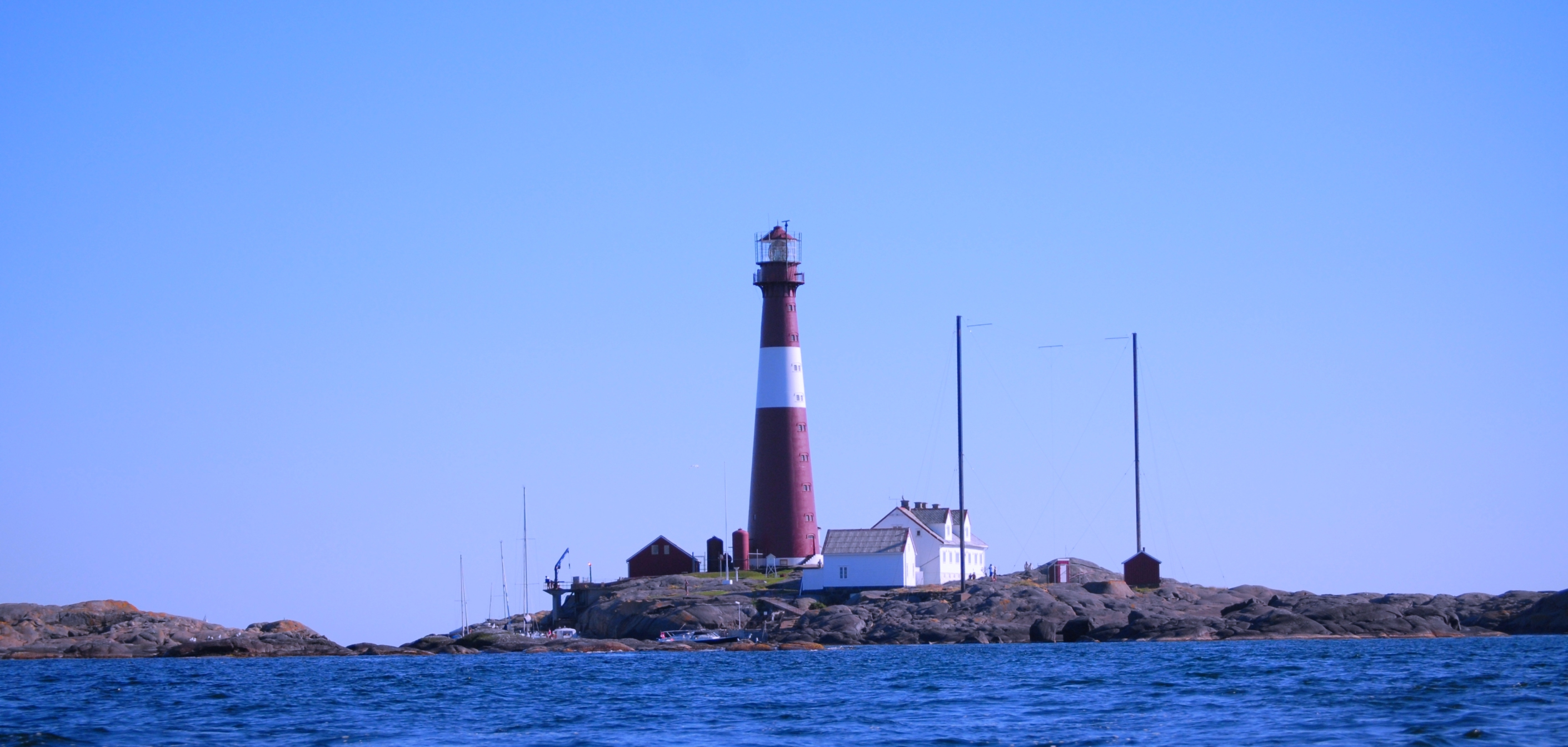
- Færder Lighthouse

- Flag Coat of arms

- Vestfold within Norway
- Coordinates: 59.35°N 10.12°E
- Country: Norway
- County: Vestfold
- District: Østlandet
- Administrative centre: Tønsberg

Government
  - Body: Vestfold County Municipality
  - Governor (2024): Trond Rønningen
  - County mayor (2023): Anne Strømøy (H)

Area
  - Total: 2,167.7 km^{2} (837.0 sq mi)
  - Land: 2,092.4 km^{2} (807.9 sq mi)
  - Water: 75.2 km^{2} (29.0 sq mi) 3.5%
  - Rank: #14 in Norway

Population (2023)
  - Total: 253,555
  - Rank: #11 in Norway
  - Density: 121.2/km^{2} (314/sq mi)
  - Change (10 years): ▲ +9.2%
- Demonym: Vestfolding

Official language
  - Norwegian form: Bokmål
- Time zone: UTC+01:00 (CET)
  - Summer (DST): UTC+02:00 (CEST)
- ISO 3166 code: NO-39
- Income (per capita): 148,300 NOK kr (2001)
- GDP (per capita): 219,970 NOK kr (2001)
- GDP national rank: #10 in Norway (3% of country)
- Website: Official website

Vestfold (pronounced [ˈvɛ̂stfɔɫ]) is a county in Eastern Norway. Located on the western shore of the Oslofjord, it borders Buskerud and Telemark counties. The capital and largest city of the county is Tønsberg, Norway's oldest city. With the exception of the city-county of Oslo, Vestfold is the smallest county in Norway by area.

Vestfold is located west of the Oslofjord, as the name indicates. It includes many smaller, but well-known towns in Norway, such as Holmestrand, Horten, Åsgårdstrand, Tønsberg, Sandefjord, Larvik and Stavern; these towns run from Oslo in an almost constant belt of urban areas along the coast, ending in Grenland in neighbouring county Telemark. The river Numedalslågen runs through the county. Many islands are located at the coast. Vestfold is mostly dominated by lowland and is among the best agricultural areas of Norway. Winters last about three months, while pleasant summer temperatures last from May to September, with a July average high of 17 °C (63 °F).

Vestfold is traditionally known for shipping and sailing. Sandefjord was formerly a headquarters for the Norwegian whaling fleet, and Horten used to be Norway's main naval port. The coastal towns of Vestfold now engage in fishing and shipbuilding. Some lumbering is carried on in the interior. The area also includes some of the best farmland in Norway.

Vestfold merged with neighboring Telemark on 1 January 2020 as part of a nationwide municipal reform. The new county was Vestfold og Telemark. Vestfold was re-established on 1 January 2024, following a vote of the county council of Vestfold og Telemark on 15 February 2022 to split the newly established county into its respective counties that existed before the merger took place; Telemark and Vestfold.

Vestfold was until 2019 the only county in which all municipalities had declared Bokmål to be their sole official written form of the Norwegian language. From its re-establishment in 2024, Vestfold is the only county in Norway to have Bokmål as the official written form.

== Etymology ==
Vestfold is the old name of the region which was revived in modern times. Fold was the old name of the Oslofjord, and the meaning of the name Vestfold is the region west of the Fold (see also Østfold). Before 1919, the county was called Jarlsberg og Larvik Amt. The amt was created in 1821, consisting of the two old counties of Jarlsberg and Larvik. In the Viking Age, Vestfold also referred to Eiker, Drammen, Kongsberg, Lier, now in Buskerud.

Vestfold Hills on Antarctica's Sørsdal Glacier is named after the county.

== History ==
=== Viking history ===
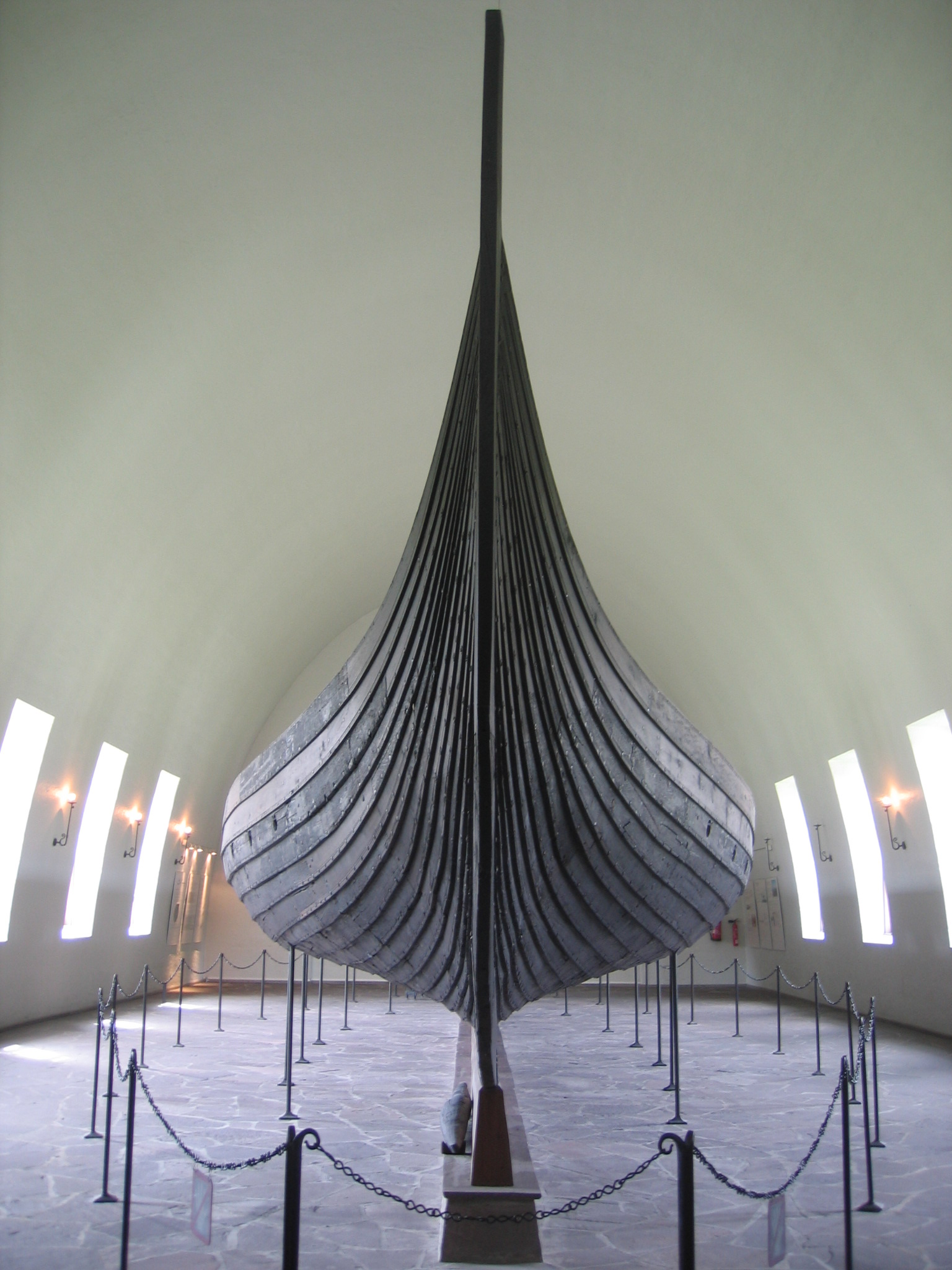
Norway's largest preserved Viking ship, Gokstad ship, was discovered at Gokstad Mound, Sandefjord Municipality.

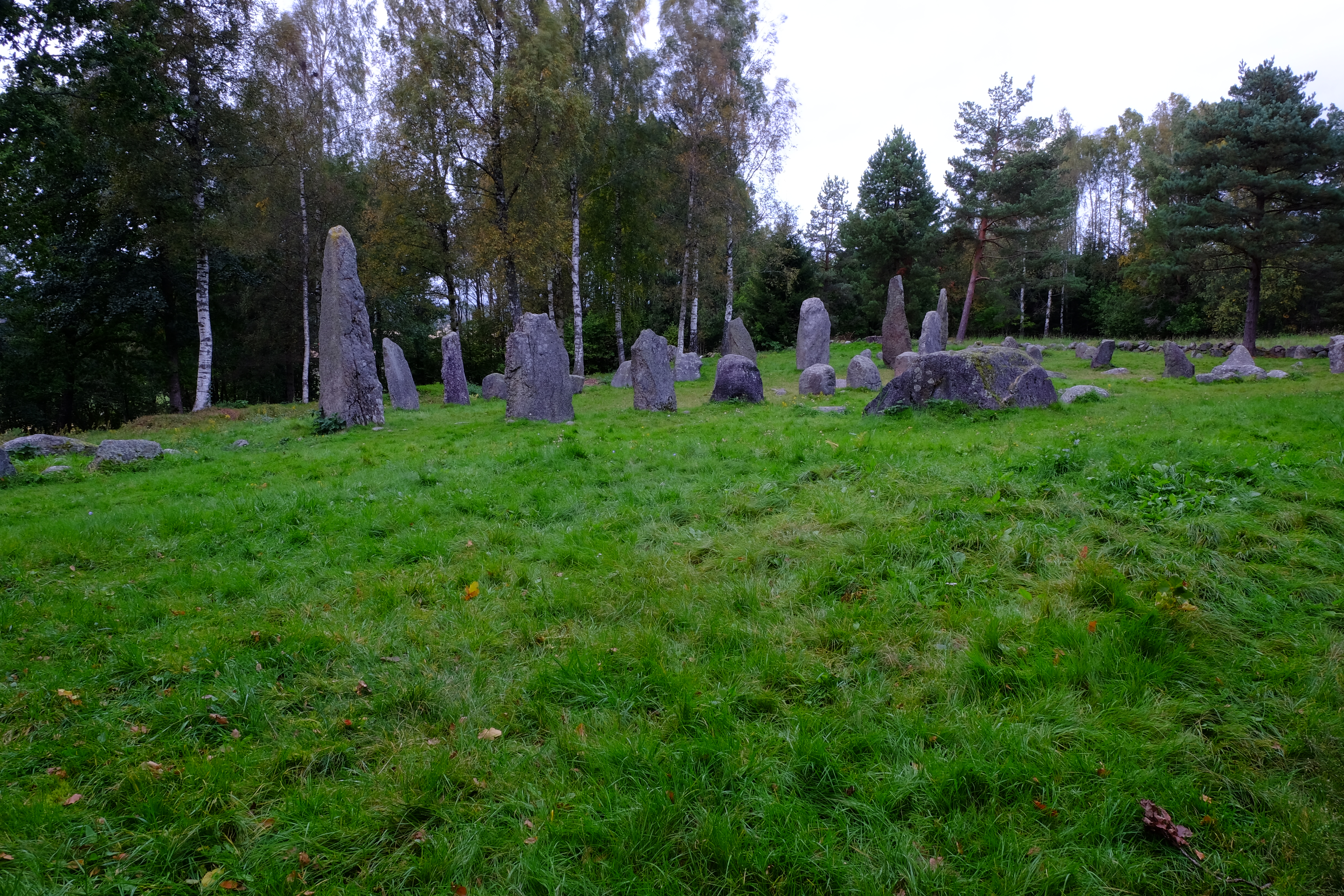
Istrehågan, ancient burial ground which dates to the Roman Iron Age, 1500-500 BC

Historical population
Year	Pop.	±%
1951	154,670	—
1961	174,382	+12.7%
1971	175,402	+0.6%
1981	186,691	+6.4%
1991	198,354	+6.2%
2001	215,030	+8.4%
2011	233,705	+8.7%
2021?	262,777	+12.4%
2031?	287,496	+9.4%
Source: Statistics Norway.

Vestfold is mentioned for the first time in a written source in 813, when Danish kings were in Vestfold to quell an uprising amongst the Fürsts. There may have been as many as six political centers in Vestfold. At that time Kaupang, which was located in Tjølling near Larvik, had been functioning for decades and had a chieftain. Kaupang, which dates from the Viking Age, is believed to be the first town in Norway, although Tønsberg (which dates from ca. 900) is the oldest town in Norway still in existence. At Borre, there was a site for another chieftain. That site held chieftains for more than one hundred years prior to 813.

The stone mounds at Mølen have been dated to the Viking Age. The mounds at Haugar in present-day Tønsberg's town centre have been dated to the Viking period. At Farmannshaugen in Sem there seems to have been activity at the time, while activity at Oseberghaugen and Gokstadhaugen dates from a few decades later.

An English source from around 890 retells the voyage of Ottar (Ottar fra Hålogaland) "from the farthest North, along Norvegr via Kaupang and Hedeby to England", where Ottar places Kaupang in the land of the Dane - danenes land. Bjørn Brandlien says that "To the degree that Harald Hårfagre gathered a kingdom after the Battle of Hafrsfjord at the end of the 9th century - that especially is connected to Avaldsnes - it does not seem to have made such a great impression on Ottar". Kaupang is mentioned under the name of Skiringssal (Kaupangen i Skiringssal) in Ottar's tales.

By the 10th century, the local kings had established themselves. The king or his ombudsman resided in the old Royal Court at Sæheim i Sem, today the Jarlsberg Estate (Jarlsberg Hovedgård) in Tønsberg. The farm Haugar (from Old Norse haugr meaning hill or mound) became the seat for Haugating, the Thing for Vestfold and one of Norway's most important place for the proclamation of kings. The family of Harald Fairhair, who was most likely the first king of Norway, is said to have come from this area.

The Danish kings seem to have been weak in Vestfold from around the middle of the 9th century until the middle of the 10th century, but their rule was strengthened there at the end of the 10th century. The Danish kings seem to have tried to control the region until the 13th century.

==== Kings ruling some or all of Vestfold ====
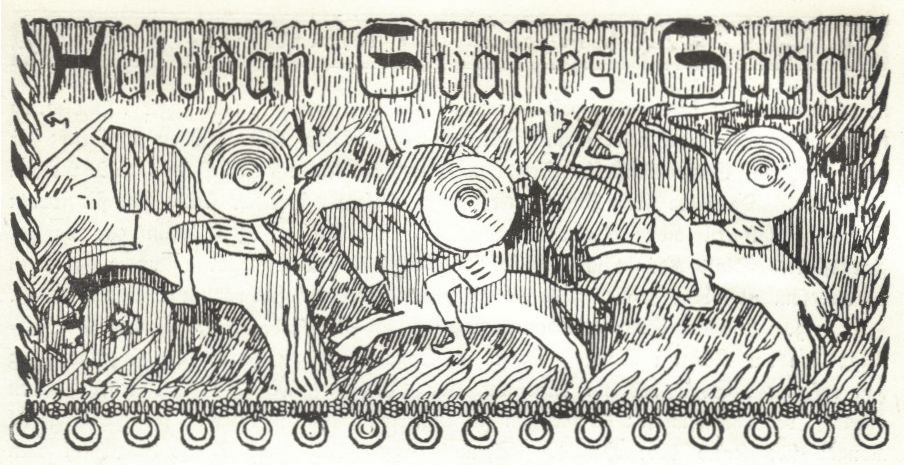
Halfdan the Black, 9th century king of Vestfold. His brother was long believed to be buried at the Gokstad Mound.

- Erik Agnarsson
- Halfdan Hvitbeinn (part of Vestfold)
- Eystein Halfdansson
- Halfdan the Mild
- Gudrød the Hunter
- Halfdan the Black, together with his brother, Olaf Gudrødsson
- Ragnvald Heidumhære, Cousin of Harold Fairhair
- Harald Fairhair
- Bjørn Farmann
- Olaf Haraldsson Geirstadalf, brother of Bjørn
- Harald Gudrødsson Grenske, 976–987

=== Whaling ===
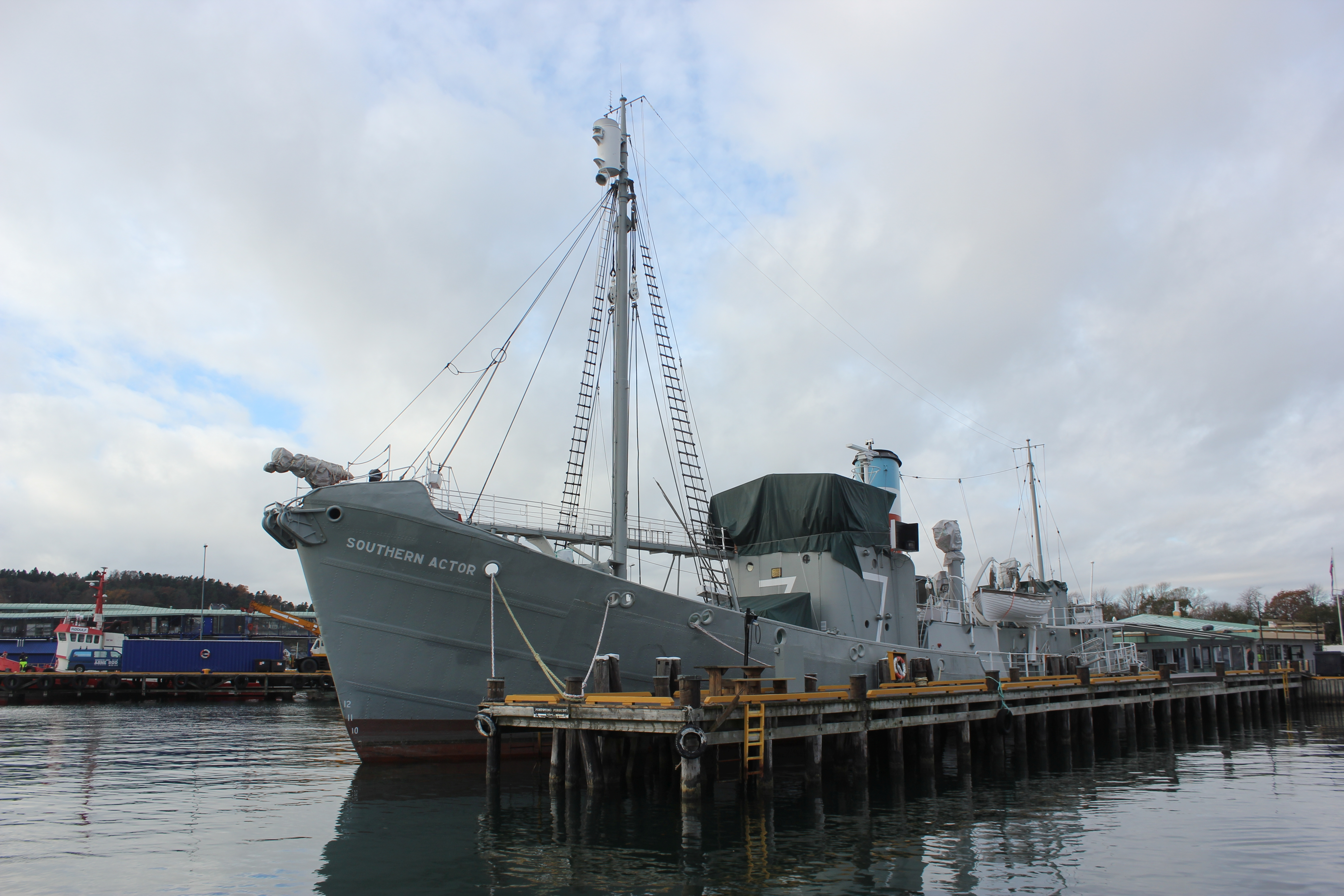
Southern Actor, whale-catcher turned museum ship

Whaling was an important 19th century industry in coastal cities such as Larvik, Tønsberg, and Sandefjord, which was the world centre for the world's modern whaling industry. Not only did men from Vestfold County make up practically all the crew on the Norwegian whaling fleet, but many were also involved in the whaling industry in other nations. As an example, the first phase of modern Australian whaling was almost entirely based on workers from Larvik. While the first whaling station in the Faroe Islands was established by Sandefjordians, Larvik played a similar role for the Shetland Islands. Tønsberg initiated much of the whaling industry in Iceland and the Hebrides.

The largest settlement in South Georgia and the South Sandwich Islands, Grytviken, was established by Carl Anton Larsen of Sandefjord on 16 November 1904. Sandefjordian Nils Larsen's expeditions to Antarctica in the early 20th century led to the Norwegian annexation of Bouvet Island (1927) and Peter I Island (1929). A cove on Peter I Island is named Sandefjord Cove in honor of Nils Larsen's hometown.

Sandefjord Harbor is now home to Southern Actor, the only whale-catcher from the Modern Whaling Epoch still to be in its original order. The museum ship is owned by Sandefjord Whaling Museum, Europe's only museum dedicated to whaling. Sandefjord has been named the centre of the Modern Whaling Epoch, and has been nicknamed "the whaling capital of the world."

== Geography ==
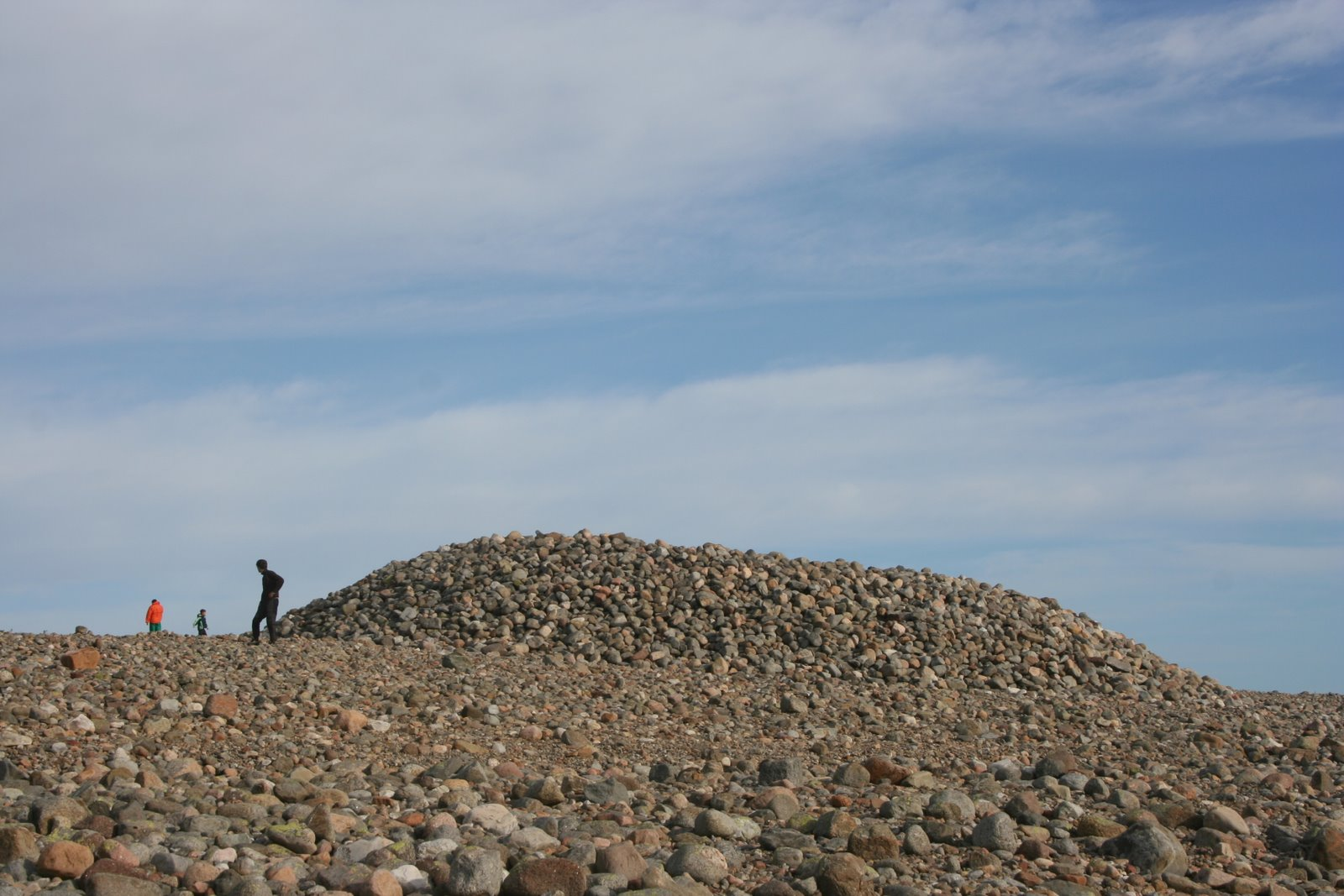
Mølen, Scandinavia's first UNESCO Global Geopark

Vestfold is Norway's smallest county, with the exception of the city-county of Oslo. It lies on the western shore of the Oslofjord. Vestfold borders with Buskerud County in the north and with Telemark County in the west. It is bordered by Skagerrak in the North Sea to both the south and east. The county has a total area of 2,157 square kilometres (833 sq mi) and has a 980 kilometres (610 mi) coastline. Vestfjellet at 634.04 metres (2,080.2 ft) is the tallest peak in the county. It is also home to 1,407 islands. Nøtterøy (60 square kilometres (23 sq mi)) is the largest island in Vestfold, while Tjøme (39 square kilometres (15 sq mi)) is the second-largest island.

There is a total of 634 freshwater lakes in Vestfold, with a total area of 79 square kilometers. Large lakes include Farris, Eikeren, Goksjø, Hallevannet, Akersvannet, and others. Vestfold makes up 0.7 percent of Norway's total land area. Ten Norwegian municipalities are larger in size than Vestfold County. As an example, Kautokeino Municipality in Finnmark County is over four times larger than Vestfold County. Finnmark county is 22 times larger than Vestfold county.

=== Geology ===
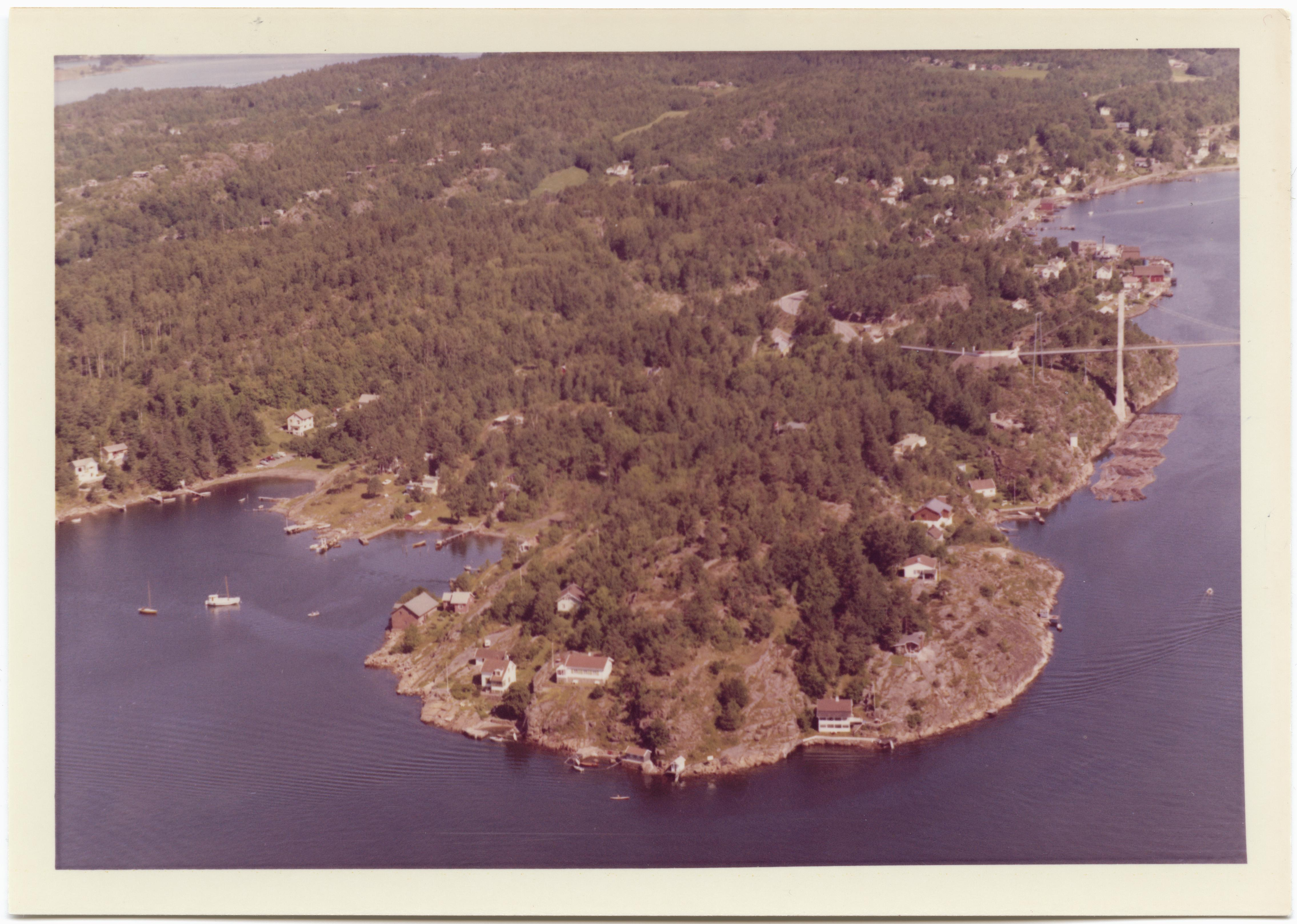
Nøtterøy is the largest island in Vestfold.

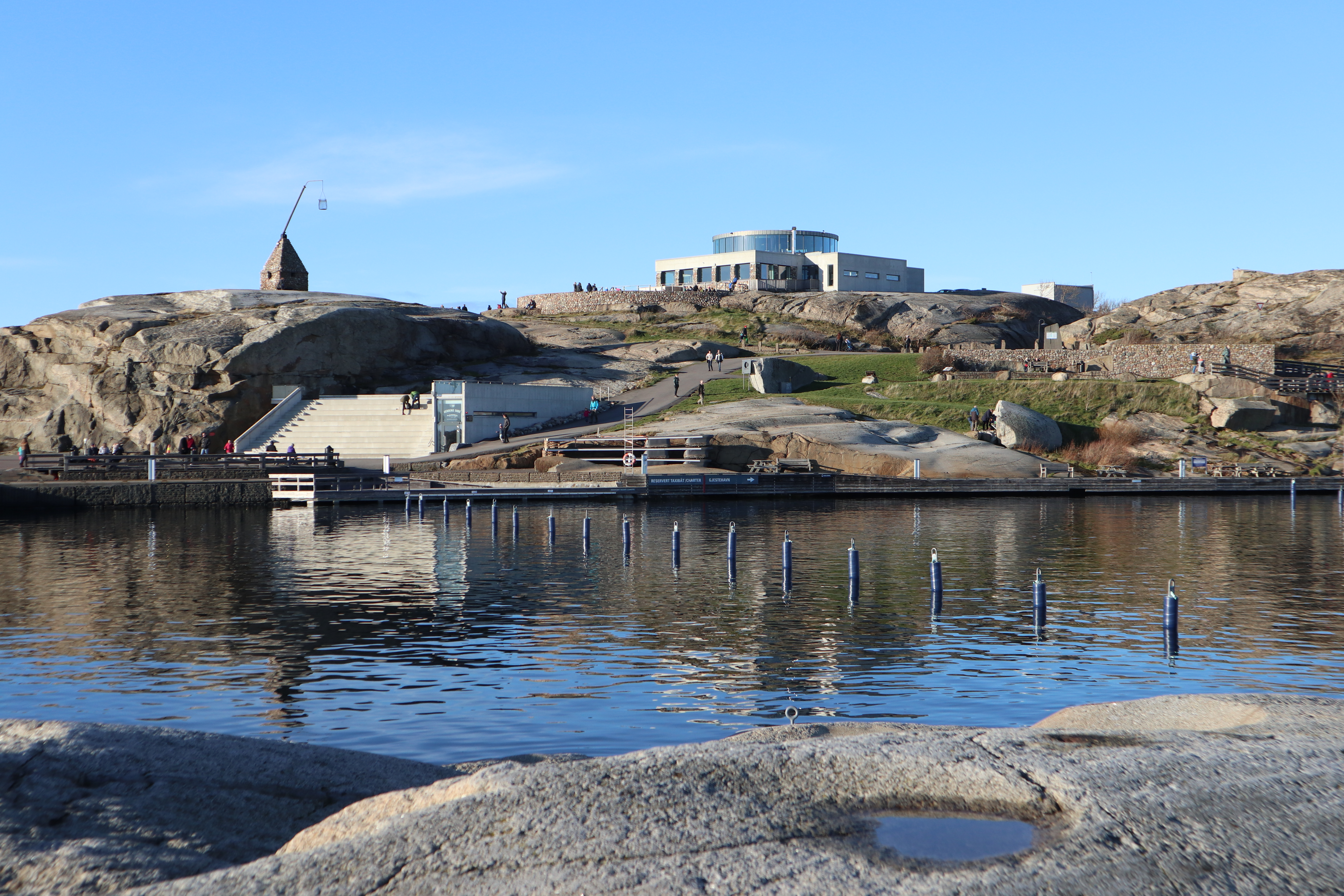
Visitor Center at World's End in Færder National Park

The county's soft soil is composed of varieties of moraine and sedimentary soils. The Ice Age left large parts of Vestfold below sea level, and the most cultivated soil can be found on the marine terraces. Marine clay and sand cover most of the lower lying country in the south-west and north. The Vestfold moraine, a continuation of the Østfold moraine at Moss, is an ice-formed formation which stretches as a cohesive gravel ridge through the county, from Horten in the east to Mølen in the south.

=== Preserved areas ===
Færder National Park was the county's first national park when the decision was formalized by King Harald V on 23 August 2013. The visitor center is at World's End, and was officially opened by Queen Sonja on 26 June 2015. The national park lies in Færder Municipality and is made up of 325 square kilometres (125 sq mi) of ocean and 15 square kilometres (5.8 sq mi) of land. It stretches from Ormøy in the north to Færder Lighthouse in the south. It is one of two marine national parks in Norway, and is made up of coast, skerries, islands and sea bed.

Mølen in Larvik Municipality is home to Norway's largest stone beach and is an ancient burial site consisting of 230 cairns, some exceeding 35 metres (115 ft) in diameter. Excavations have dated the rock piles to about 250 A.D. It was the first UNESCO Global Geopark in the Nordics when established in 2008. Mølen is one of Larvik's most popular tourist attractions. It is home to over a hundred species of rock, including Norway's national stone, Larvikite, which is named from the area. It is a crucially important seabird habitat, where over 316 species of bird have been recorded.

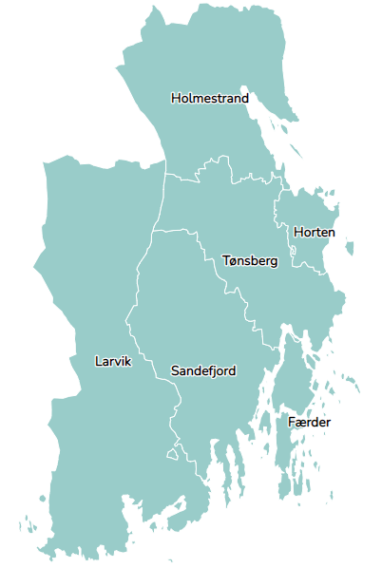
Municipalities in Vestfold County

=== Municipalities ===
Vestfold has experienced a large reduction in number of municipalities. As of 1949, the county was home to 19 rural municipalities and 7 city municipalities. There were 14 municipalities as of 2016, but the number decreased to 6 as of 2024. Vestfold has the least amount of municipalities of any county in Norway.

1. Holmestrand Municipality
2. Horten Municipality
3. Tønsberg Municipality
4. Færder Municipality
5. Sandefjord Municipality
6. Larvik Municipality

== Towns and cities ==
- Holmestrand
- Horten
- Larvik
- Sandefjord
- Stavern
- Tønsberg
- Åsgårdstrand

== Villages ==
- Andebu
- Barkåker
- Berger
- Bergsåsen
- Bjerkøya
- Bjørnevåg
- Borgheim
- Borre
- Brekkeåsen
- Buerstad
- Duken
- Eidsfoss
- Eik
- Eikeberg
- Fevang
- Fokserød
- Fon
- Freberg
- Føynland
- Gjone
- Glomstein
- Gretteåsen
- Grimestad
- Gullhaug
- Hafallen
- Helgeroa
- Hem
- Hof
- Hulebakk
- Husvik
- Husøy
- Hvasser
- Høyjord
- Hårkollen
- Kaupang
- Kjose
- Kjøpmannskjær
- Klever
- Kodal
- Kvelde
- Lahelle
- Linnestad
- Melsomvik
- Nesbrygga
- Nesbygda
- Nevlunghavn
- Nykirke
- Ormelet
- Oterbekk
- Ramnes
- Revetal
- Rånerudåsen
- Råstad
- Sande
- Selvik
- Sem
- Skallestad
- Skinmo
- Skjerve
- Skoppum
- Solløkka
- Solvang
- Stokke
- Storevar
- Strand
- Strengsdal
- Sundbyfoss
- Sundene
- Svarstad
- Svelvik
- Svinevoll
- Teie
- Tenvik
- Tjøllingvollen
- Torød
- Ula
- Unneberg
- Valberg
- Vassås
- Vear
- Veierland
- Verdens Ende
- Verningen
- Vestskogen
- Vollen
- Årøysund

== Parishes ==
- Andebu
- Arnadal (Arendal)
- Berg
- Borre
- Botne
- Brunlanes
- Fon
- Fredricksværn, see Stavern
- Hedrum
- Hem
- Hillestad
- Hof
- Holmestrand
- Horten
- Hvarnes
- Høyjord
- Kjose
- Kodal
- Konnerud
- Kvelde
- Langestrand
- Lardal
- Larvik
- Nykirke
- Nøtterøy
- Ramnes
- Sandar
- Sande
- Sandefjord
- Sandeherred, see Sandar
- Sankt Laurentii
- Sem
- Skjee
- Skoger
- Slagen
- Stavern
- Stokke
- Strømm (Strømmen)
- Strømsgodset
- Styrvoll
- Svarstad
- Svelvik
- Tanum
- Tjølling
- Tjøme
- Tønsberg
- Undrumsdal
- Valløy
- Vassås
- Vivestad
- Vor Frue (Maria)
- Våle
- Åsgårdstrand
- Larvik Branch (LDS, early-1927)
- Tønsberg Branch (LDS, early-1951)
- Larvik (Katolske Apostoliske, 1888–1963)

== Former municipalities ==
- Andebu Municipality
- Borre Municipality
- Botne Municipality
- Brunlanes Municipality
- Hedrum Municipality
- Hof Municipality
- Lardal Municipality
- Nøtterøy Municipality
- Ramnes Municipality
- Sandar Municipality
- Sem Municipality
- Skoger Municipality
- Stavern Municipality
- Stokke Municipality
- Strømm Municipality
- Tjølling Municipality
- Tjøme Municipality
- Våle Municipality
- Åsgårdstrand Municipality

== Political strength ==
Results from parliamentary elections in Vestfold County since 1973:

Bold letters represent the alliances (Leftwing Ap+SV. Centre KrF+V+Sp. Rightwing H+Frp). M = Number of elected parliamentarians.

Year	Ap	SV	Total	M	KrF	V	Sp	Total	M	H	Frp	Total	M
1973	33,8	8,9	42,7	3	10,3	3,0	7,6	20,9	2	26,5	6,6	33,1	2
1977	39,8	2,6	42,4	3	10,2	2,8	7,2	20,2	1	33,7	2,0	35,7	3
1981	33,9	2,9	36,8	3	8,2	3,2	4,2	15,6	0	41,9	4,7	46,6	4
1985	35,4	4,0	39,4	3	7,0	2,7	4,4	14,1	1	40,9	4,8	45,7	3
1989	30,1	8,3	38,4	4	7,1	2,7	4,5	14,3	0	28,9	16,5	45,4	3
1993	35,4	6,5	41,9	3	6,9	2,7	13,2	22,8	1	23,1	10,3	33,2	3
1997	33,5	5,3	38,8	3	12,5	3,2	5,6	21,3	1	18,1	20,1	38,2	3
2001	21,6	11,6	33,2	3	11,0	2,8	3,3	17,1	1	25,5	18,7	44,2	4
2005	30,2	8,4	38,6	4	6,0	5,0	3,6	14,6	0	15,3	29,3	44,6	3
2009	33,7	6,5	40,2	4	4,7	3,0	3,2	10,9	0	19,6	27,2	46,8	3
2013	29,6	3,8	33,4	2	4,9	4,5	3,0	12,4	1	30,0	19,5	49,5	4
2017	28,0	5,0	33,0	2	3,7	3,8	6,3	13,8	1	30,1	16,9	47,0	4

== Demographics ==
Religion in Vestfold
Religion	Percent
Christianity	84.85%
Islam	1.41%
Buddhism	0.26%
Other	13.48%

According to Statistics Norway, Vestfold County was home to 244,967 residents as of 1 January 2016. Immigrants made up 11.9 percent of the population in 2017. Most immigrants were from Poland (4,287 people), followed by Lithuania (2,794) and Iraq (1,549). Despite its small size, Vestfold had the third-highest population density in Norway. However, the population density may still have been considered low; as an example, the population density of the Netherlands was four times higher than that of Vestfold County in 1998.

Sandefjord was the most populous city of Vestfold County; one in four people from Vestfold were from Sandefjord, or 25.2 percent of the county population.

== Economy ==
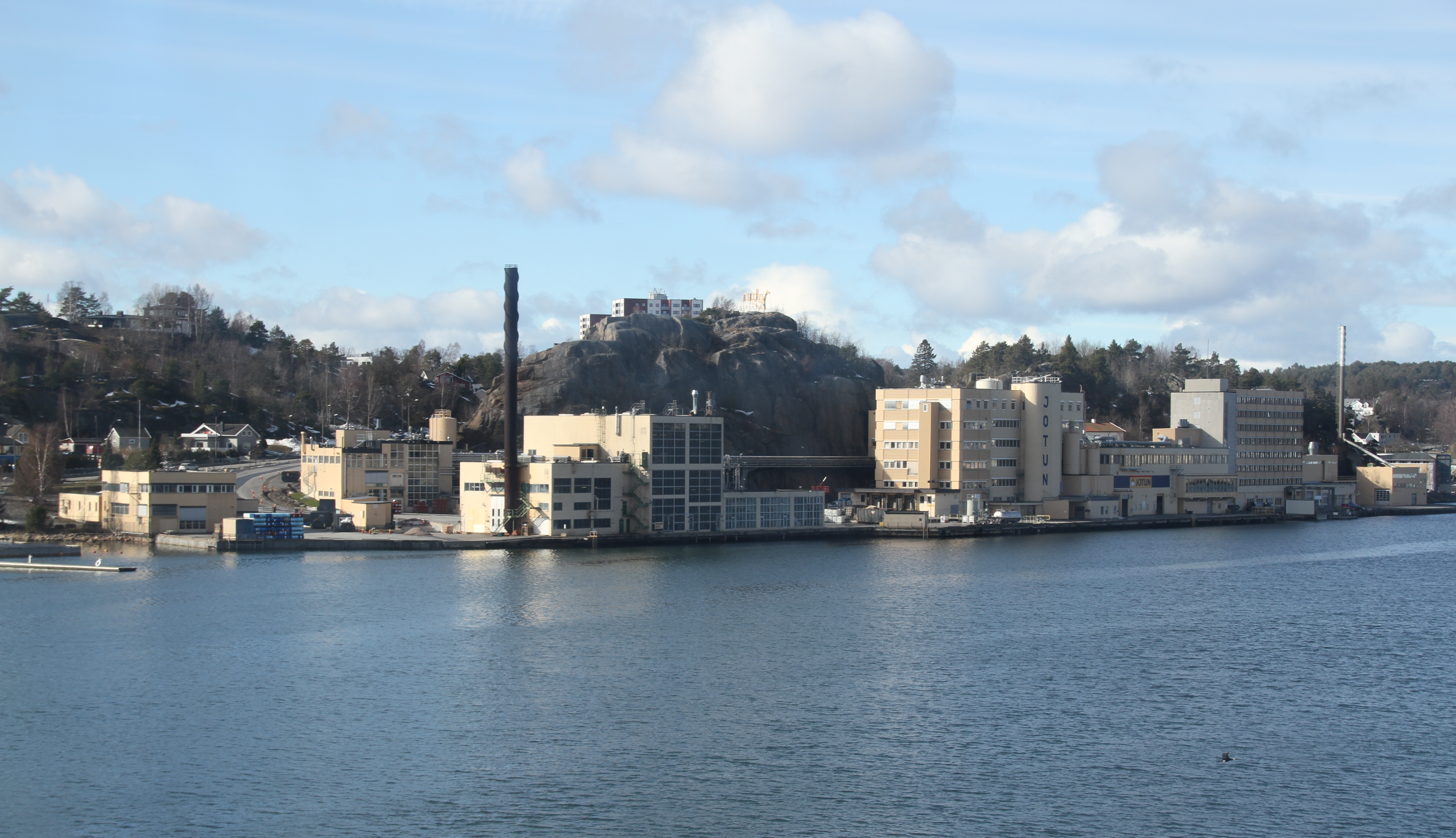
Jotun is one of the world's largest manufacturers of paints and coating products.

Traditional industries in Vestfold have included whaling and ship building. For over 50 years in the 19th century, Sandefjord and partially Tønsberg functioned as the world centre for the whaling industry. However, whaling ended in the 1960s and the ship building industry has gradually reduced since the 1980s. Information technology is currently a growing industry, and the county is home to large web shops such as Komplett, MPX.no and netshop.no. 18.9 percent of the county's total area is used for agriculture, the highest percentage of any county in Norway. 70% of agricultural lands are used for the cultivation of grains. Vestfold's farming area makes up five percent of Norway's cultivated areas. However, by area, Vestfold only makes up 0.7 percent of Norway's land area.

Vestfold has Norway's most expensive vacation homes. Sandefjord had Norway's most expensive vacation homes in 2012, while Tjøme had the most expensive homes as of 2010. General property values appreciated 28.3 percent between 2010 and 2015.

=== Tourism ===
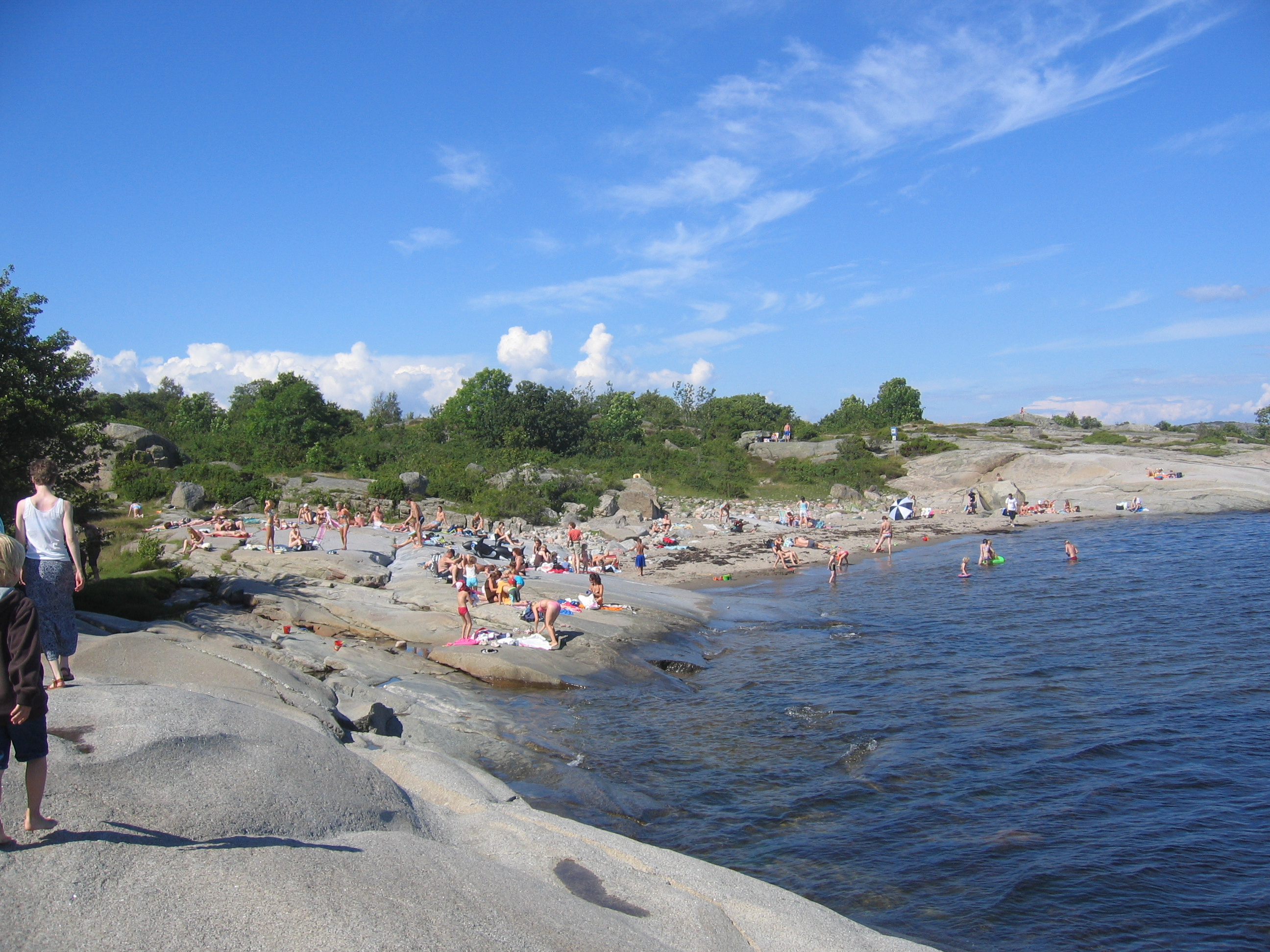
Lilleskagen Beach at Hvasser in Færder Municipality

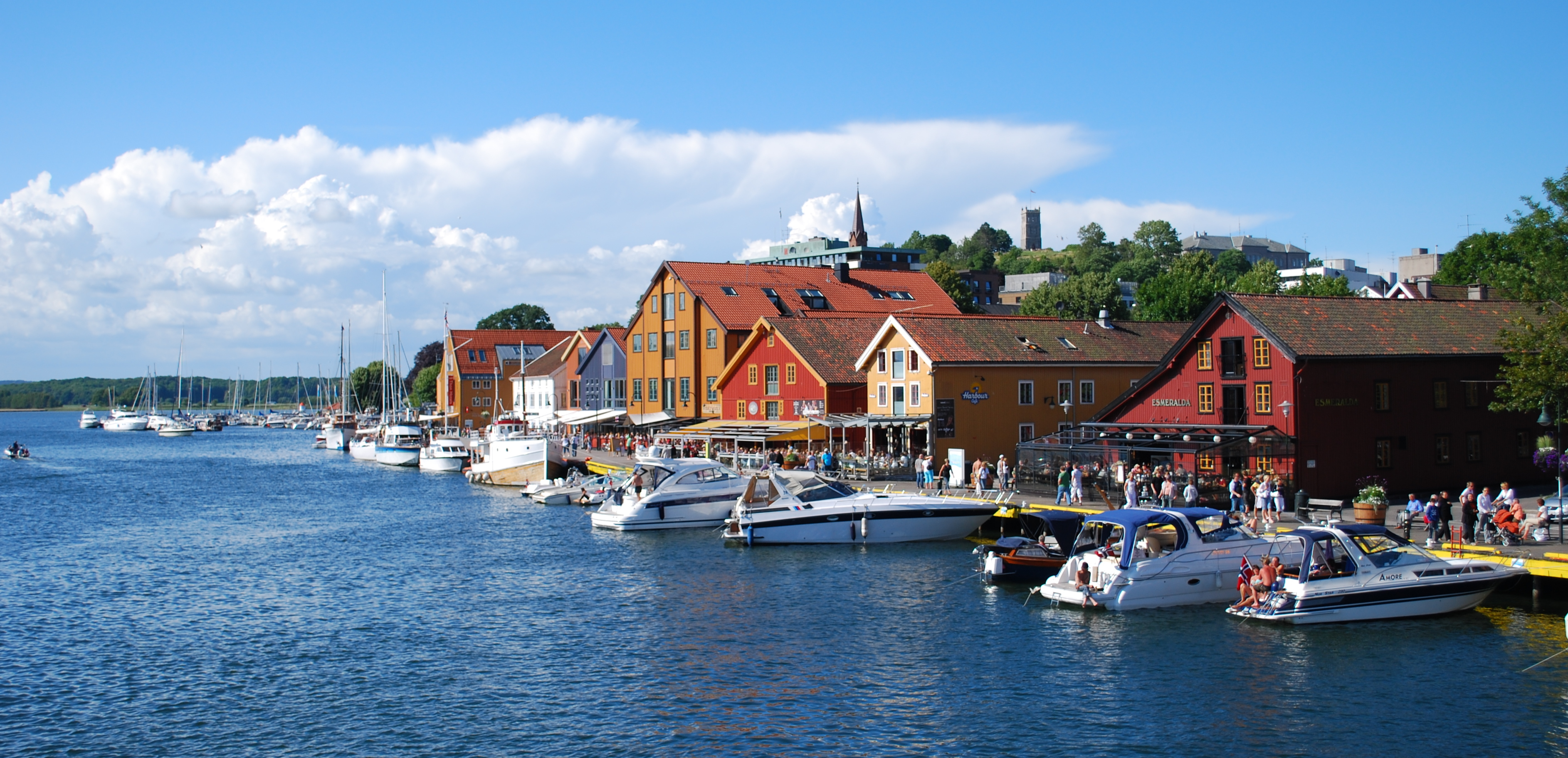
The harbor in Tønsberg

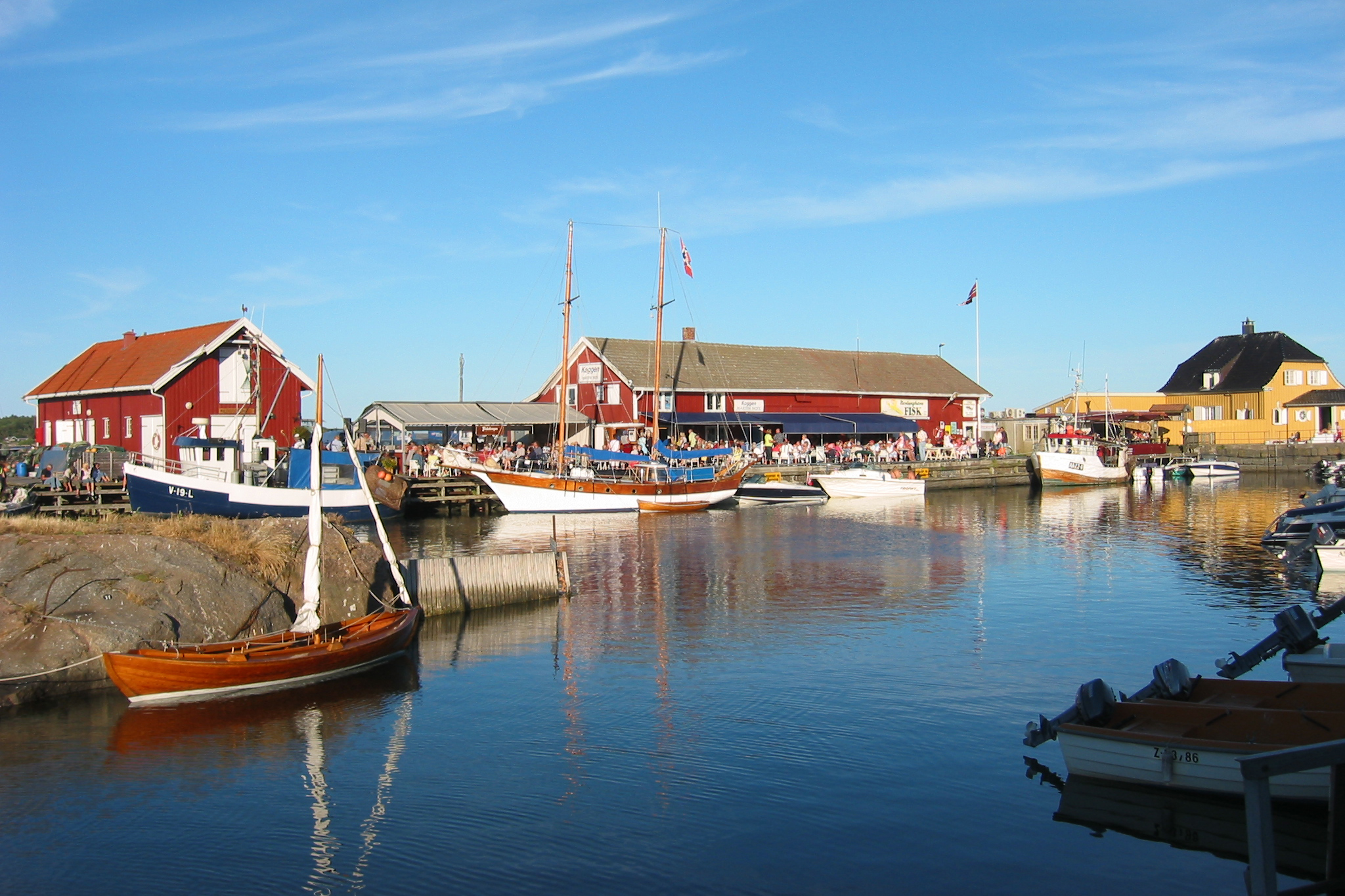
The pier in Nevlunghavn, the southernmost point in mainland Vestfold (excluding islands).

Summer tourism is an important industry in Vestfold, particularly in coastal communities such as Sandefjord, Tjøme and Stavern. Coastal cities also have large numbers of vacation homes. There were 534,724 hotel stays in 2015, where the purpose was vacationing for 236,895. Most international tourists were from the United Kingdom, Sweden, and Denmark. There were 781,459 stays at rental cabins or campgrounds in 2015. Consequentially, the population increases drastically during summer months in municipalities such as Sandefjord, Tjøme, and elsewhere. The population at Tjøme goes from 4,500 to around 50,000 each summer. The population of islands such as Tjøme often quadruple during summer, while summer communities as Stavern often sees a doubling or tripling. Tjøme Island is home to nearly as many vacation homes as residential homes.

While Tjøme has the nickname Sommerøya ("the Summer Island"), Sandefjord is nicknamed Badebyen ("the Bathing City") due to its many beaches and former spas. Sandefjord is known for its many great beaches, and it is primarily known as a summer resort community. It first became a bathing destination when sulphur was discovered in 1837. The city gained further recognition when Sandefjord Sulfur Spa and Resort (Kurbadet) was established in 1837. The bath was one of the most visited in Europe during the late 19th century.

Vestfold's most visited tourist attractions include Borre mound cemetery, the largest burial site in Northern Europe, as well as numerous sites along the coast. Architectural sites include locations in Åsgårdstrand, Karljohansvern in Horten Municipality, and Fredriksvern in Stavern. Other important attractions are Sandefjord Whaling Museum, Mølen Geopark in Larvik Municipality, as well as Tønsberg Fortress (Slottsfjellet) in Tønsberg.

=== Largest companies ===
Largest companies in Vestfold County based on operating income in 2015:

No.	Company	Operating income in 2015 (in NOK)
1	Jotun A/S	16 844 327
2	Komplett AS	7 256 700
3	Kongsberg Maritime AS	6 957 840
4	Asko Vestfold Telemark AS	4 617 791
5	Sykehuset i Vestfold HF	4 595 010

== Culture ==
Høyjord Stave Church, Vestfold's only stave church. Its chancel dates to year 1100.

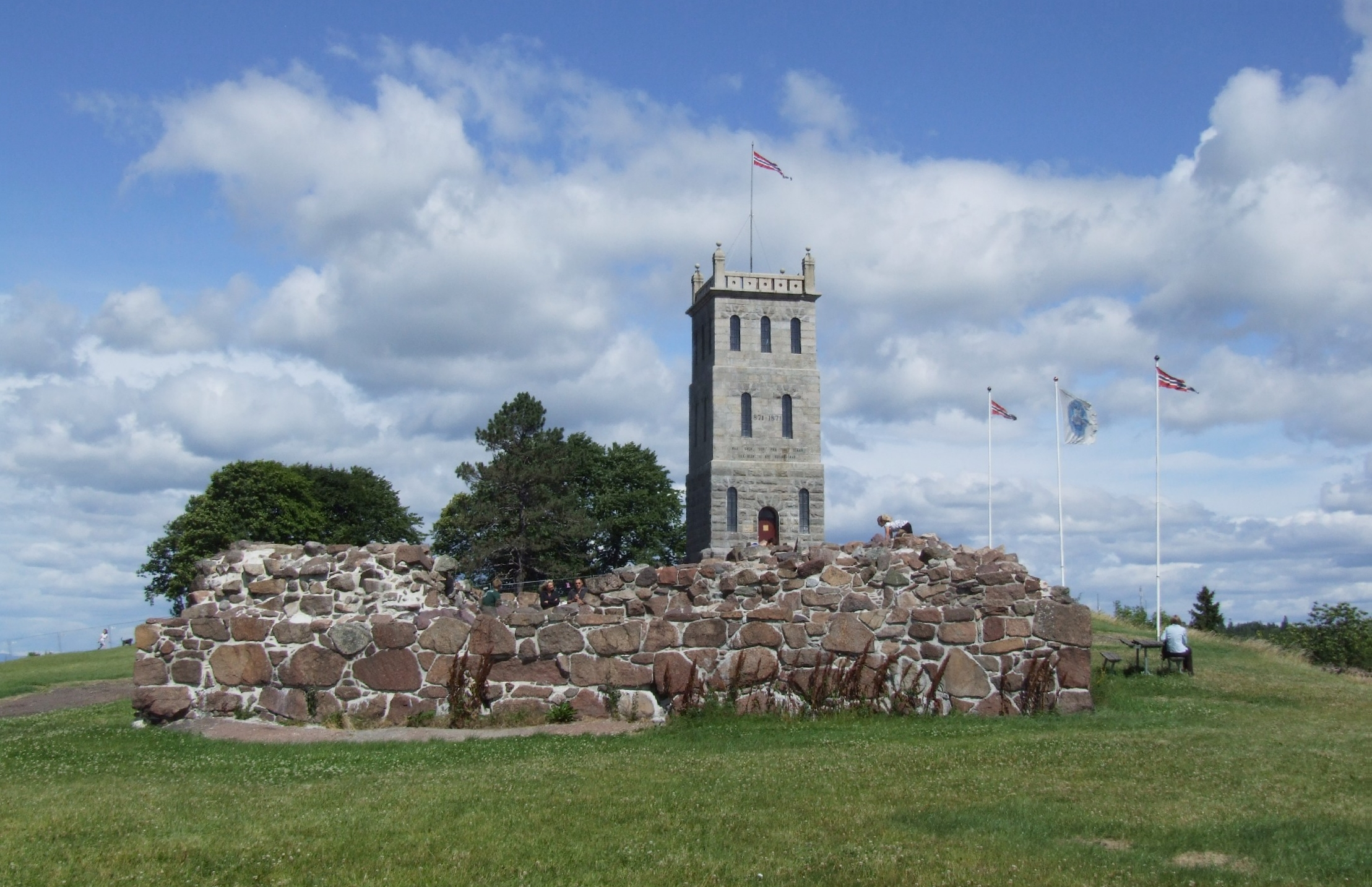
Tower at Tønsberg Fortress in Tønsberg

Vestfold is the county in Norway with the most traces from the Viking Age. Examples include the Oseberg- and Gokstad Burial Mounds. While the Oseberg Ship was discovered in Tønsberg, the Gokstad Ship was discovered in Sandefjord Municipality. The Gokstad Ship is Norway's largest preserved Viking ship. Both ships are now located at the Viking Ship Museum in Oslo. Additional burial mounds are found at Borre mound cemetery and Mølen, an UNESCO Global Geopark. Borre mound cemetery is home to Northern Europe's largest burial mound site from Viking Age.

Vestfold is home to 21 churches dating to medieval times. It is also home to one stave church, Høyjord Stave Church in Sandefjord Municipality (formerly part of Andebu Municipality). Nearby Andebu Church also has Norway's oldest parish register, dating to 1623. The city of Sandefjord proper is home to Europe's only museum dedicated to whaling, Sandefjord Museum in the city centre. This museum also owns Southern Actor, a whale-catcher turned museum ship. Southern Actor is the only whale-catcher from the Modern Whaling Epoch still to be in its original working order. Also at Sandefjord Harbor is the Harbour Chapel (Bryggekapellet), which is the only floating church in Norway and most likely Europe, perhaps the only floating church in the world.

The city of Tønsberg is Norway's oldest city, most likely founded in year 871. Tønsberg is home to Tønsberg Fortress, which is Scandinavia's largest ruin site. It includes ruins from Castrum Tunsbergis, Norway's largest castle in the 13th century. An outdoor music festival is held at Tønsberg Fortress every July. Ruins of a German fortress can be seen at Folehavna Fort on West Island, Sandefjord.

== Transportation ==
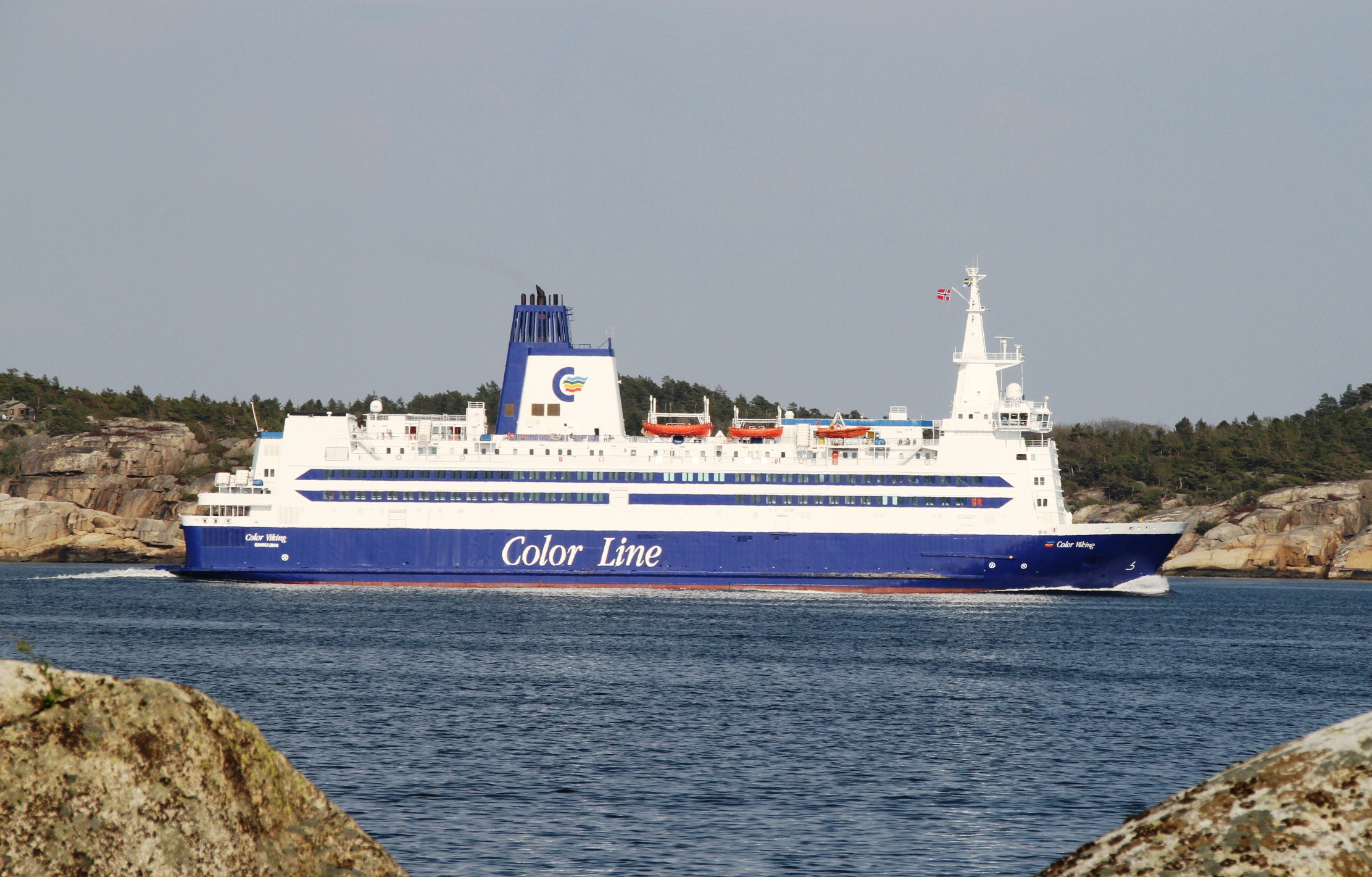
Daily ferries by Color Line and Fjord Line connect Sandefjord to Sweden.

The Vestfold Line is a railway line that runs from Drammen, through a number of towns in Vestfold and ending in the town of Skien in Telemark. European route E18 runs through the county roughly parallel to the railway.

There are two international ferry connections, both operated by Color Line. Larvik is connected to the Danish town Hirtshals, the other route is between Sandefjord and Strømstad in Sweden. Fjord Line is also a ferry operator between Sandefjord and Strømstad. In addition there is a domestic route connecting Horten and Moss.

Sandefjord Airport Torp is one of Norway's largest airports. Only Bergen- and Oslo Airports have more international flights than Torp Airport. Despite being located 74 miles south of Oslo, Torp is sometimes called Oslo Airport Torp. It is reached with a free shuttle bus from Sandefjord Airport Station on Vestfoldbanen. Torp is regional hub for low-cost carrier Norwegian, as well as low-cost carriers Ryanair and WizzAir also operate from the airport. Torp offers direct routes to over 30 international and domestic destinations, including daily flights to European cities such as London and Amsterdam.

== Points of interest ==
=== Larvik ===
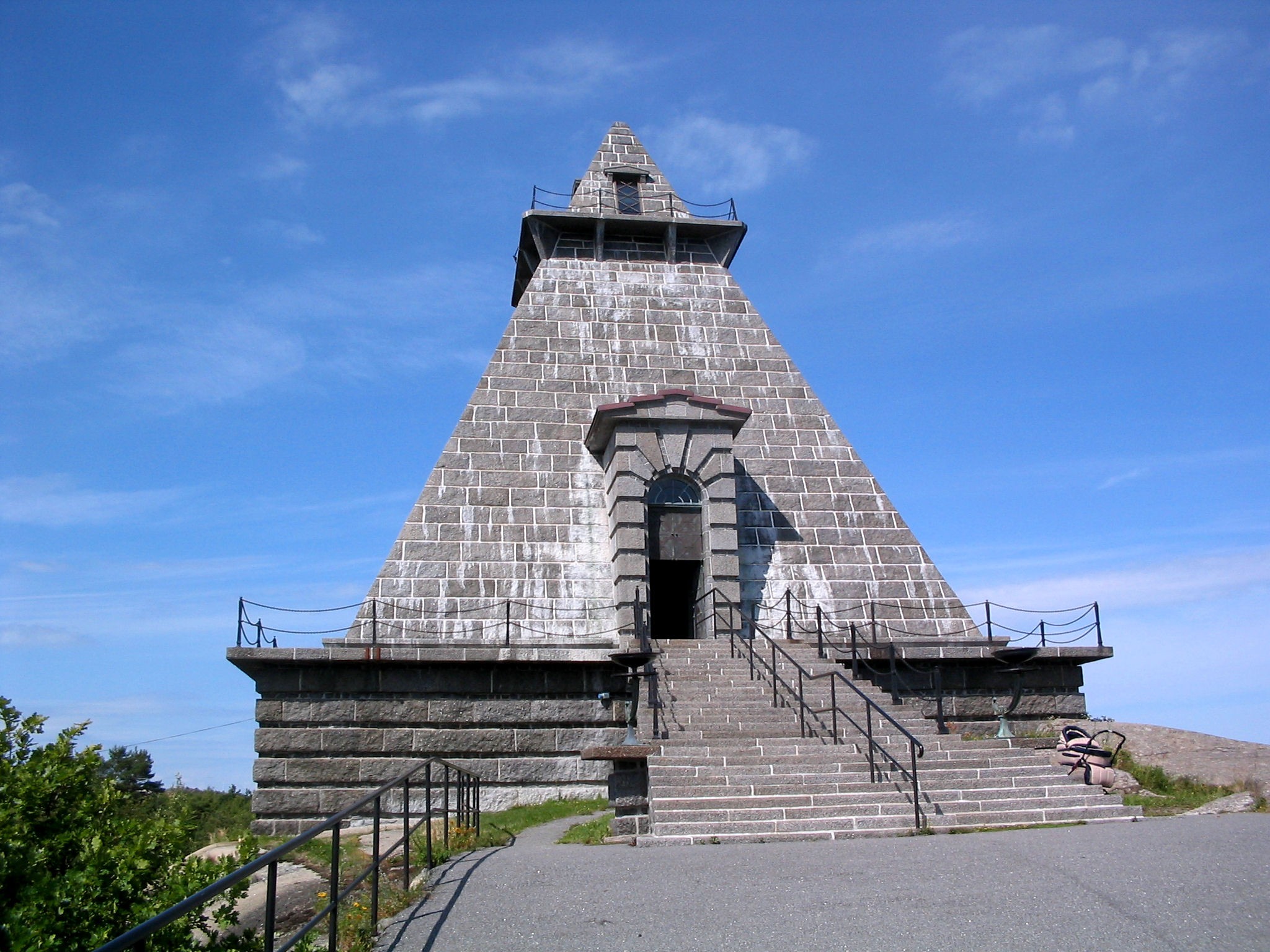
Hall of Remembrance (Minnehallen) outside Stavern

- Bøkeskogen, world's northernmost beech tree forest.
- Kaupang, home to remains for the oldest Nordic town yet discovered. The remains are from one of Scandinavia's earliest urban sites, established in year 800 A.D.
- Mølen, Scandinavia's first UNESCO Global Geopark.
- Nevlunghavn and Helgeroa, adjacent coastal villages.
- Larvik Museum
- Fritzøehus, largest privately owned estate in Norway.
- Stavern, small coastal town, home of Citadell Island
  - Fredriksvern, Norway's main naval base from the mid-1750s until 1864.
  - Minnehallen (Hall of Remembrance), largest monument in Vestfold.

=== Sandefjord ===
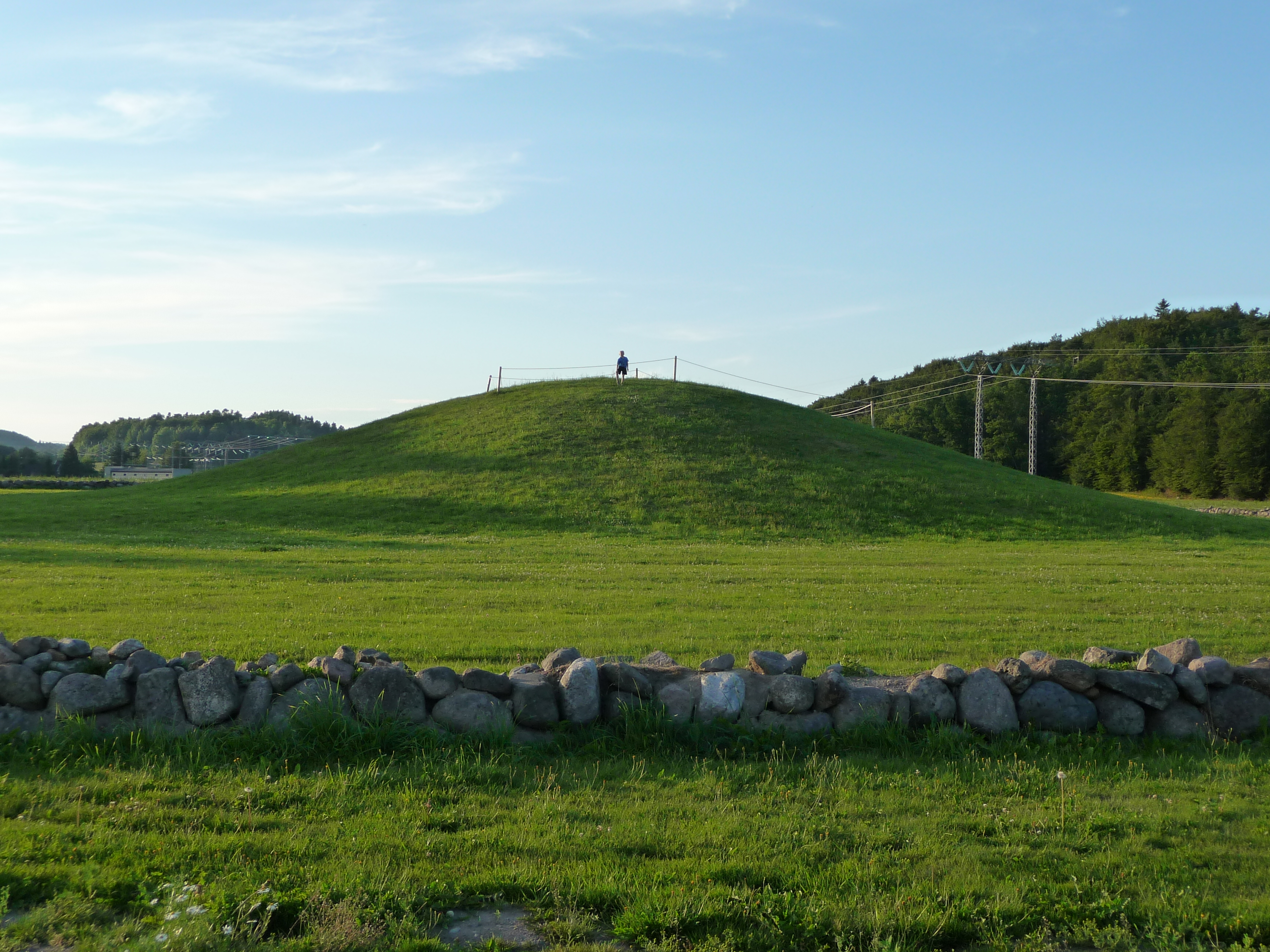
Viking chieftain Olaf Geirstad-Alf was buried at the Gokstad Mound.

- Sandefjord Museum (the Whaling Museum), Europe's only museum dedicated to whaling.
  - Southern Actor, only whale-catcher from the Modern Whaling Epoch still to be in its original working order.
- Gokstad Mound, site of the discovery of the 9th-century Gokstad Ship.
- Gaia ship, replica of the Gokstad Ship docked at Museum's Wharf.
- Sandar Church, built on ruins of a 13th-century medieval stone church. Present church was erected in 1792.
- Whaler's Monument, rotating bronze monument erected in honor of pioneering whalers.
- Sandefjord Church
- Istrehågan, ancient burial ground which dates to the Roman Iron Age around 1500-500 BCE.
- Kurbadet, former resort spa and one of Europe's most visited baths in the late 19th century.
- Folehavna Fort, ruins from a German fortress erected in 1941 during the German occupation of Norway.
- Høyjord Stave Church, the only stave church left in Vestfold County.
- Langeby, popular bathing beach at West Island.
- Goksjø, third-largest lake in Vestfold County.

=== Tønsberg and Færder ===
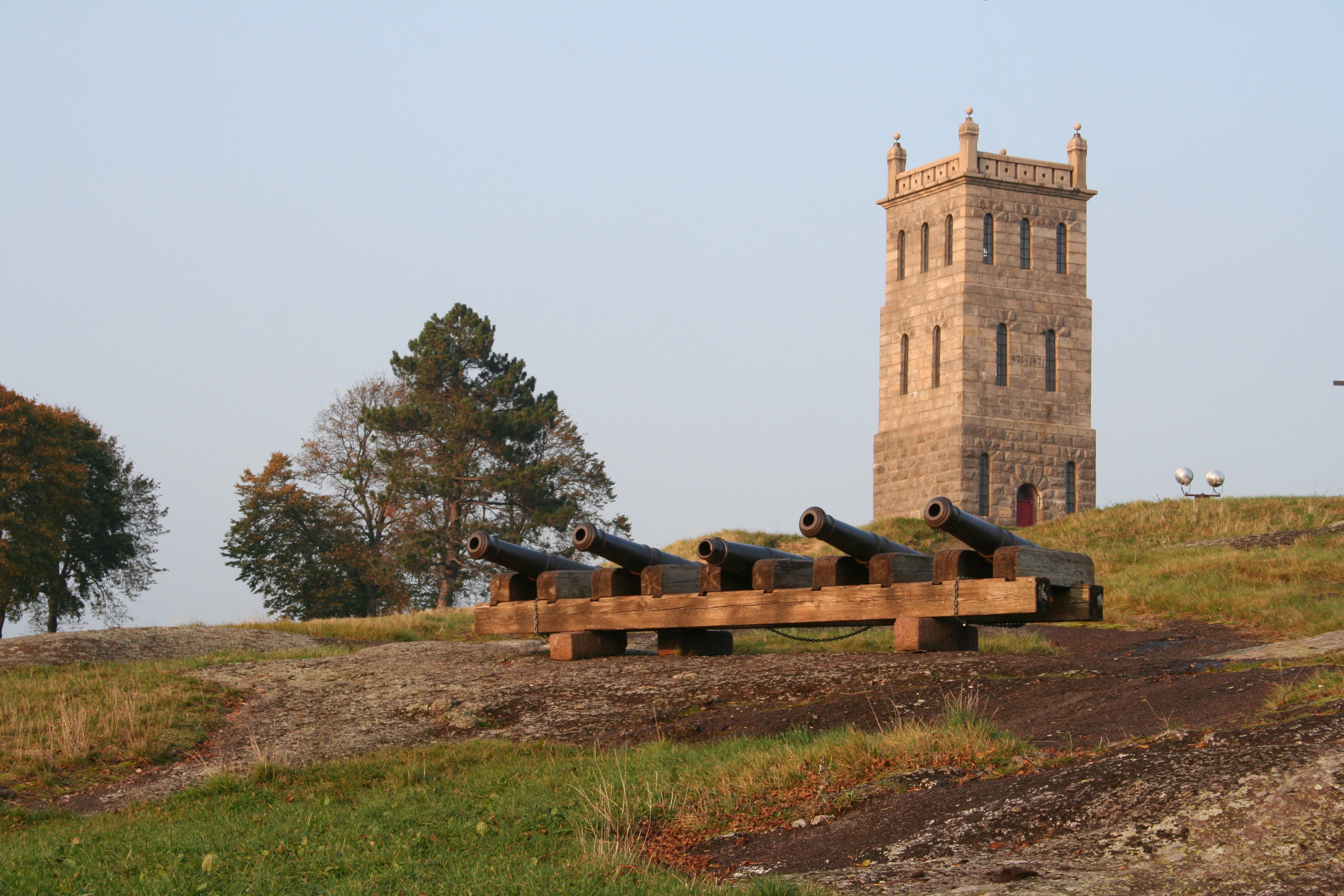
Tønsberg Fortress contains ruins from Norway's largest 13th century castle.

- Tønsberg Fortress, largest ruin park in the Nordic countries.
- Oseberg Mound, site of the discovery of the Oseberg Ship
- Haugar
- Tønsberg Cathedral
- Sem Church
- Slottsfjellmuseet
- Nordbyen
- World's End, southernmost point at Tjøme.
- Herkelås
- Tjøme Church
- Færder National Park, first National Park in Vestfold.

=== Horten ===
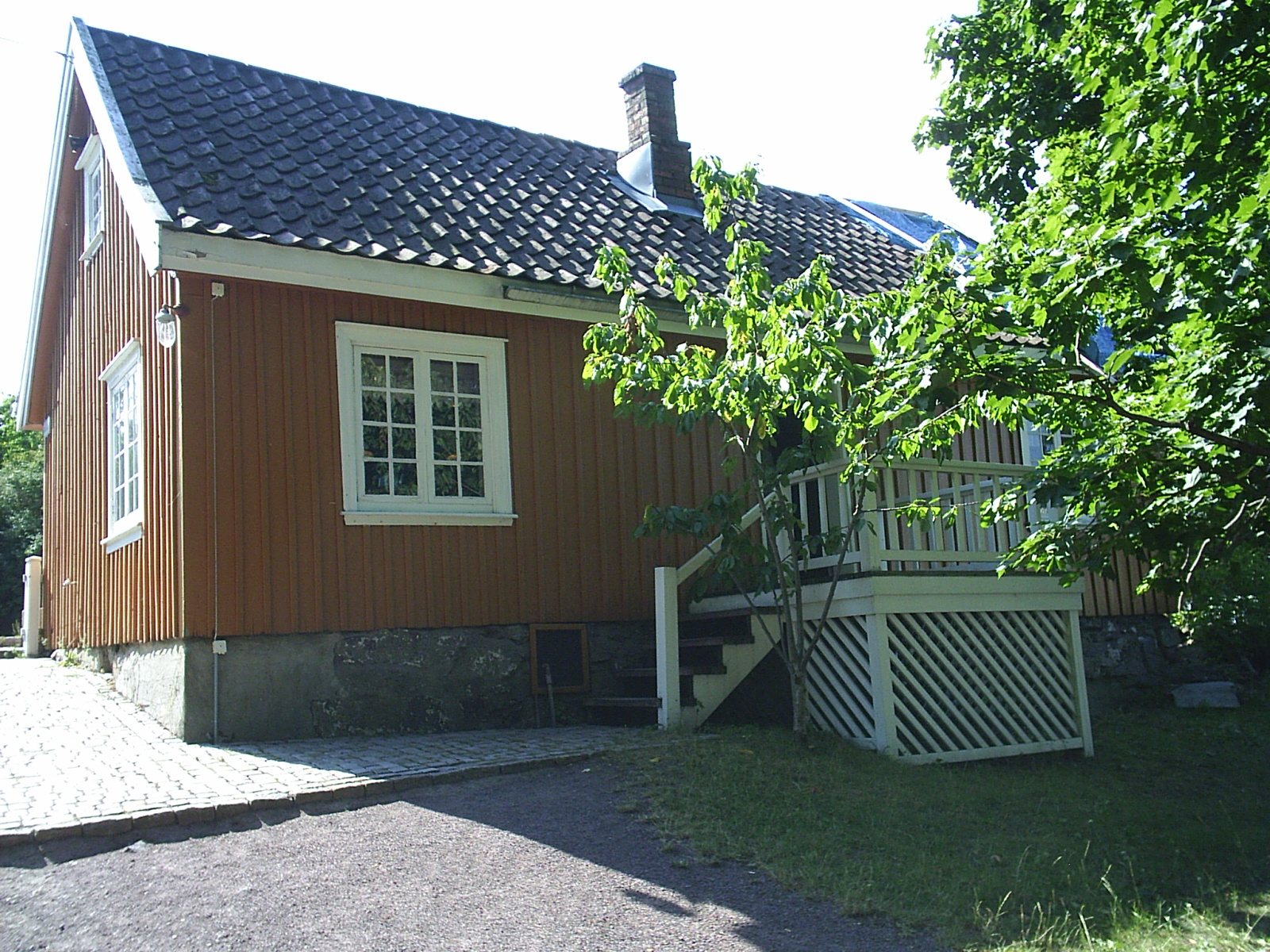
Edvard Munch's former summer house at Åsgårdstrand

- Borre National Park, largest burial mound site in Northern Europe.
- Løvøy Chapel
- Royal Norwegian Navy Museum
- Preus Museum
- Borre Church, romanesque medieval church constructed in the 1100s.
- Tordenskioldeika
- Åsgårdstrand, oceanside resort town.
- Borre Golfbane

== Archaeological sites ==
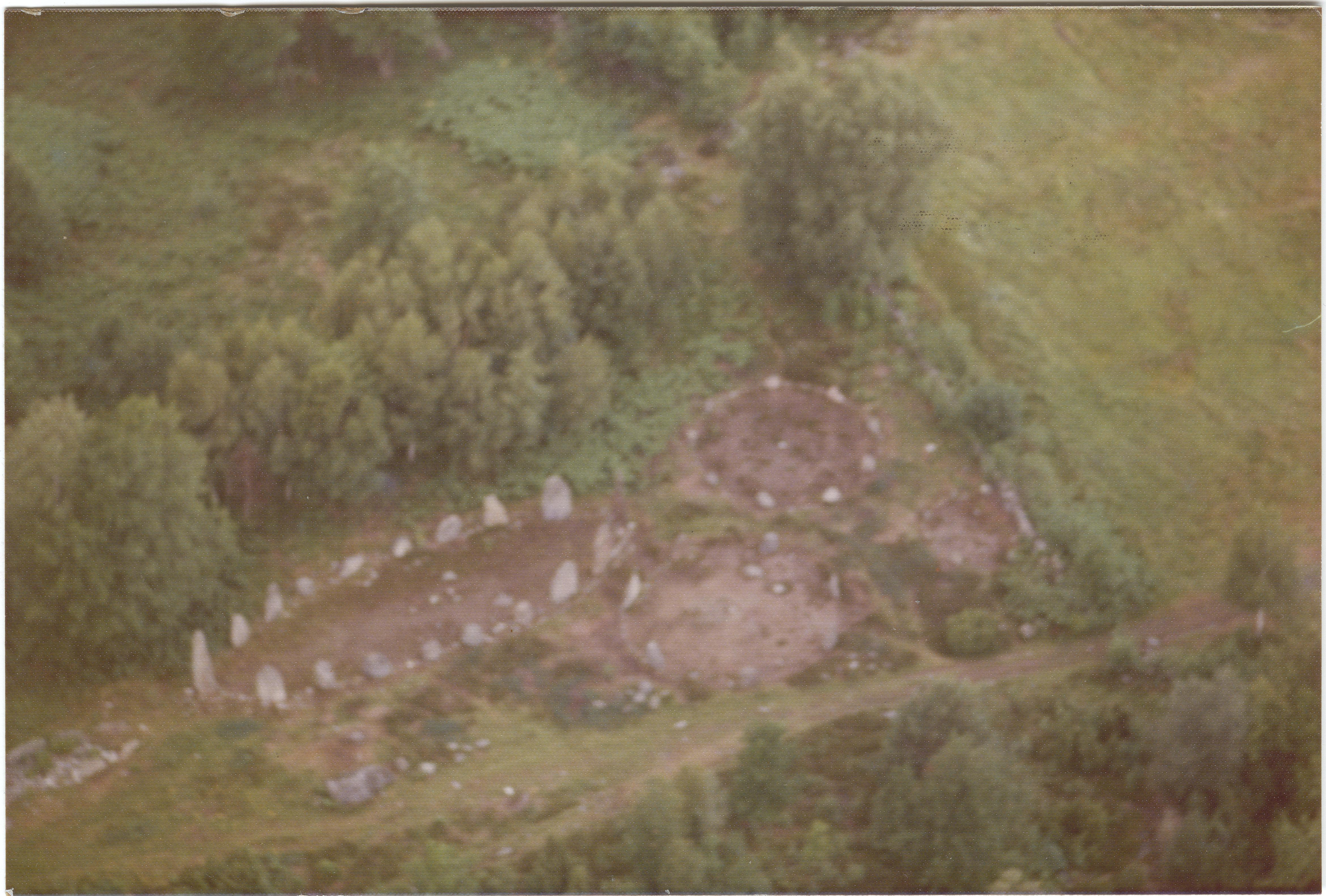
The rock settings at Istrehågan resemble a ship.

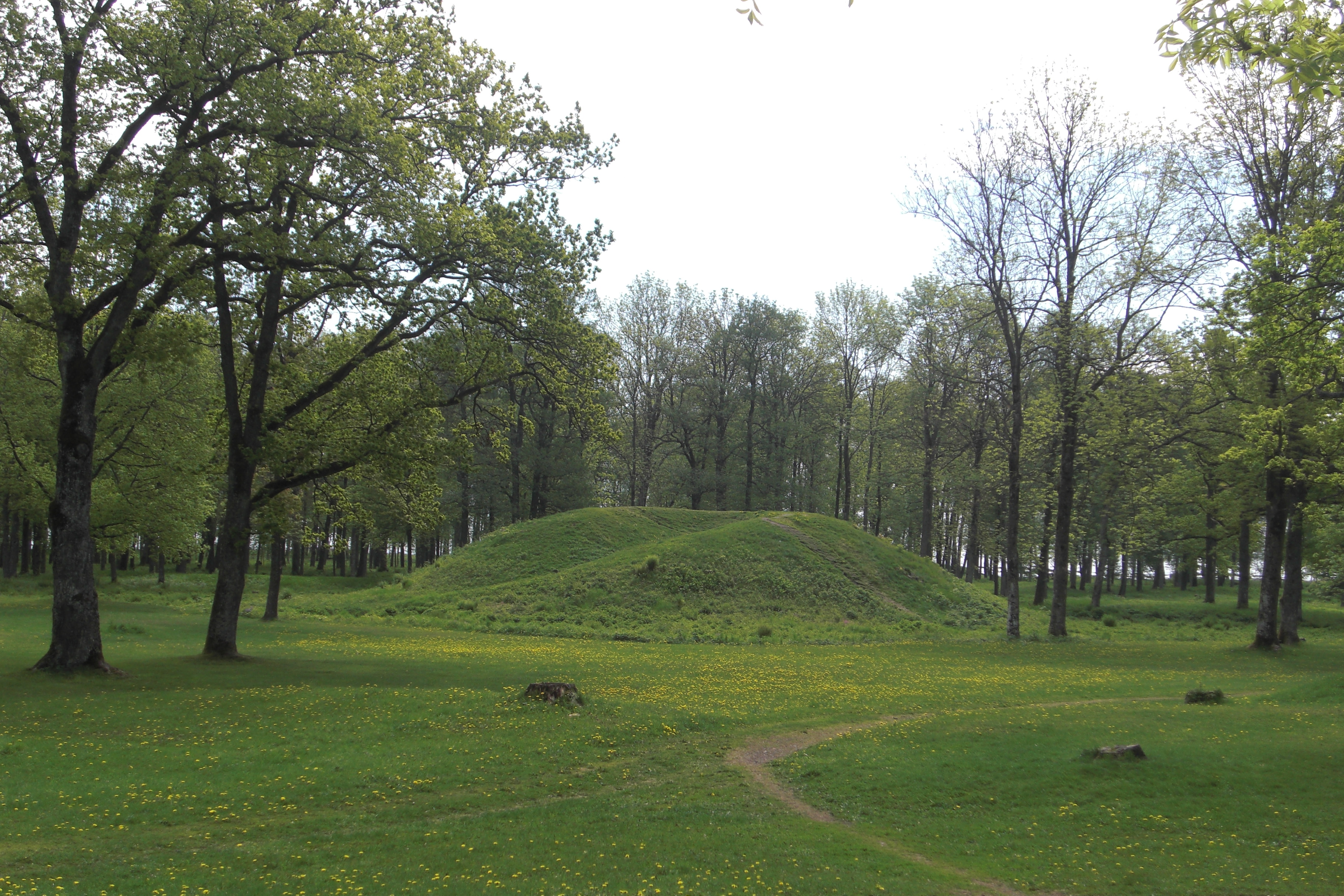
Borre National Park is home to Scandinavia's and Northern Europe's largest burial mound site.

=== Istrehågan ===
Istrehågan is an ancient burial ground which dates to the Roman Iron Age around 1500-500 BCE. It is located at Jåberg near Tjøllingvollen, on the border between Sandefjord Municipality and Larvik Municipality. The rock settings at Istrehågan resemble a ship. It is 24 metres (79 ft) long, and 9 metres (30 ft) meters broad. Archaeological excavations made in 1959-61 uncovered remains of bones, bear claws, pottery shards, a brooch, and more. At Haugen farm on the Sandefjord side is Vestfold County's largest collection of petroglyphs.

=== Borre National Park ===
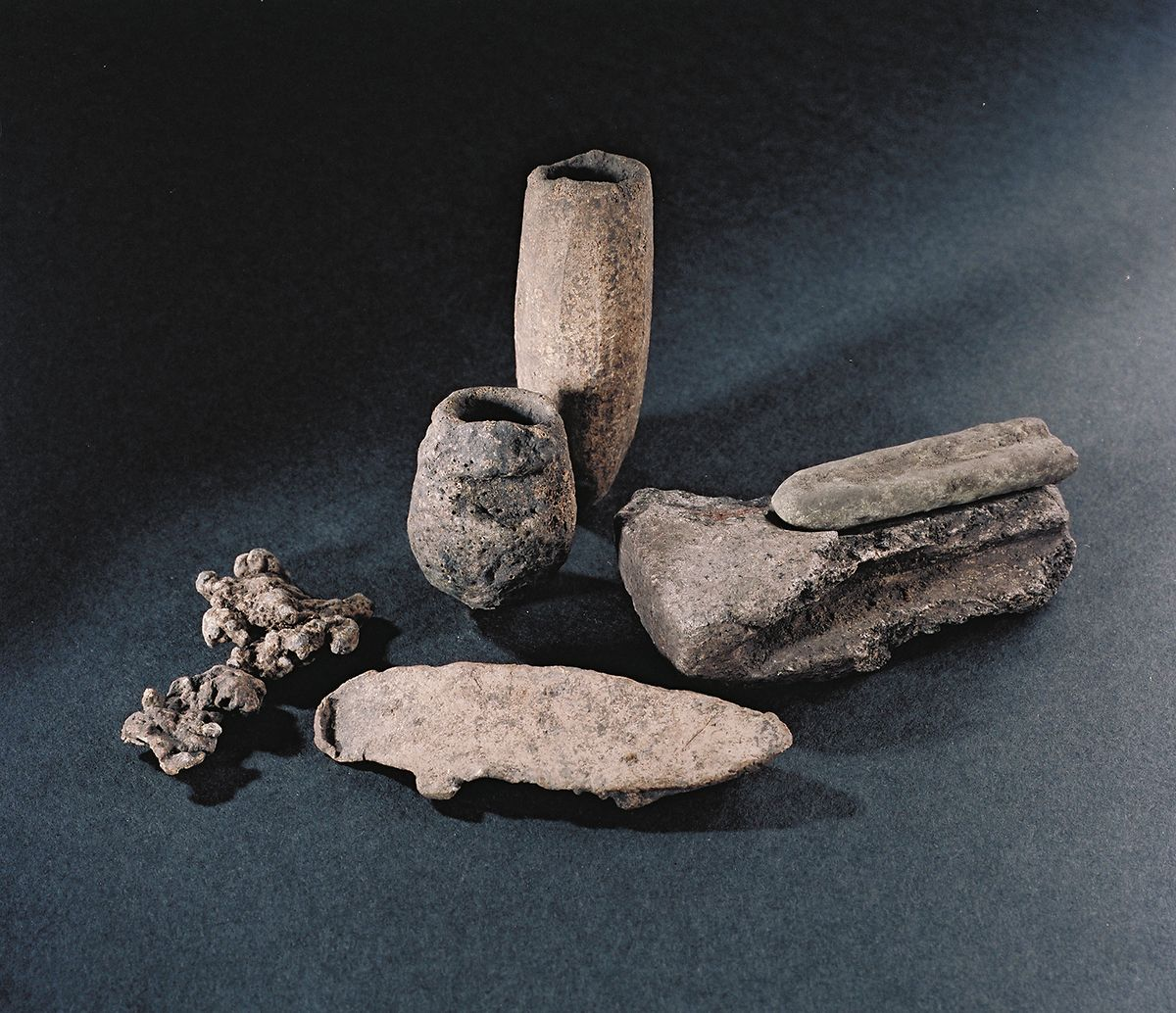
Tools found by archeologists at Kaupang

At Borrehaugene near Borrre there are 9 large mounds and around 30 smaller ones. It is the largest burial mound site in Northern Europe.

Borre mound cemetery most likely contains graves belonging to kings of the Yngling dynasty. It is mentioned in the poem Ynglingatal as the burial site of one of two kings belonging to the royal dynasty of the Ynglingas.

=== Kaupang ===
Kaupang in Skiringssal (Larvik Municipality) is home to remains from the oldest Nordic town yet discovered. It was a trade centre established around year 800, making it one of Scandinavia's earliest urban sites. The settlement was abandoned in the mid-10th century. It is located in Kaupang Bay in Viksfjord, Larvik Municipality. Archeological finds include melting pots, jewelry parts, casting moulds and casting models. Most of Kaupang remains not excavated. There are replicas of Viking homes at Kaupang today, giving insight to how homes were constructed during the Viking Age.

=== Oseberg Burial Mound ===
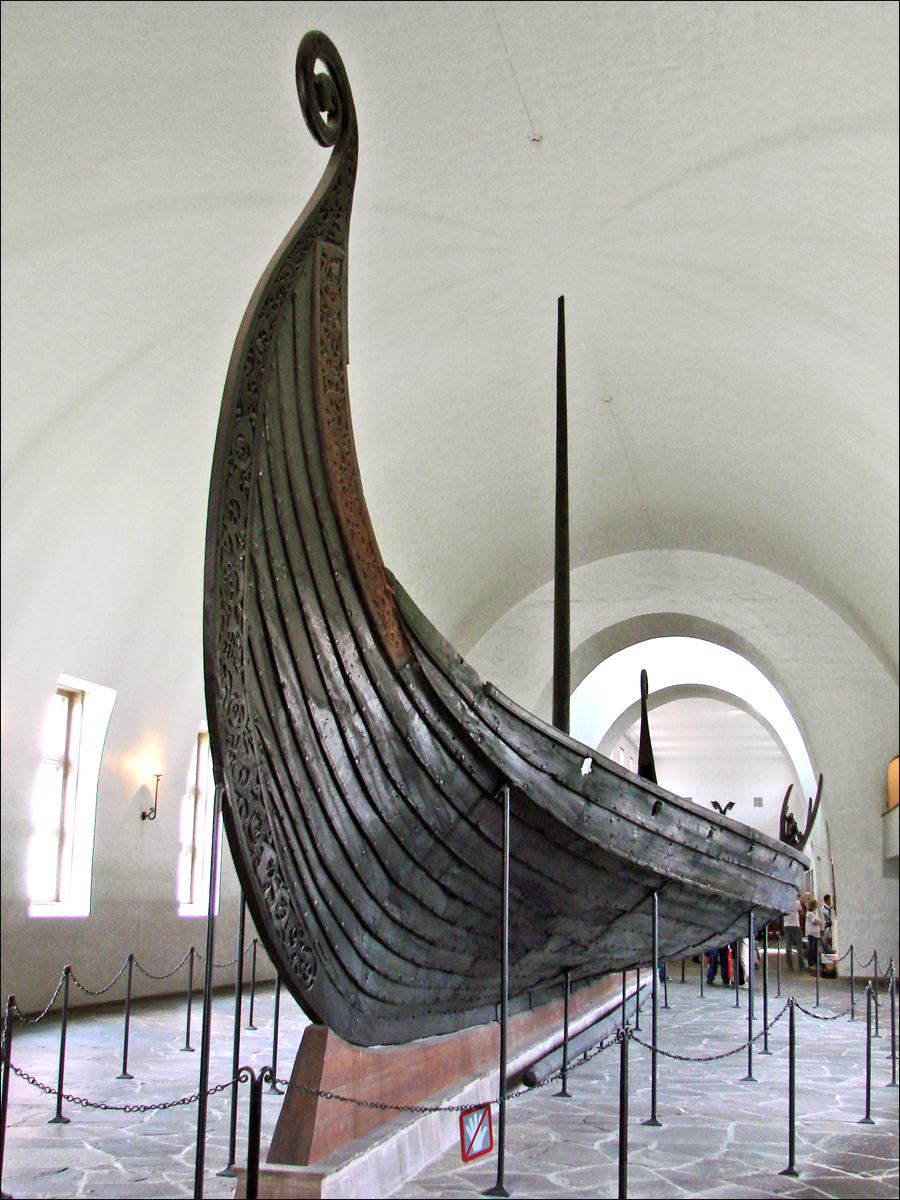
The 22-meter (72 ft.) Oseberg Ship was excavated in Tønsberg.

Oseberg Mound is located in Tønsberg and is where the Oseberg Ship was discovered. The ship, which dates to 834 A.D., had a length of 22 metres (72 ft). Two female skeletons were found in the ship's burial chamber.

=== Viking burial site at Gulli ===
Gulli, outside Tønsberg, was the site of an archaeological excavation during the period from 2003 to 2004, prior to asphalt being laid for constructing the new E18 (road). There were 60 graves - 20 of those were preserved to a degree that [authorities decided] permitted examinations. "Perhaps the most spectacular [item] was a høvre" - used with a horse's harness. "There are few of those in Norway - one in Trøndelag and a gilded one found in Borre". The artifacts are on display at the Midgard Historical Centre in Borre.

=== Fevang ===
19th century archeologists were struck by the many burial mounds and artifacts discovered at Fevang near Torp Airport in Sandefjord Municipality. Local farmers had discovered various artifacts in the 19th- and early 20th centuries. Archeologist Nicolay Nicolaysen traveled to Fevang and concluded that Fevang was home to an array of ancient burial mounds. Nicolaysen further discovered that Fevang had been an active graveyard for over 1,000 years - since year 0 A.D. until the first Christian cemeteries were established. Among the artifacts discovered were a gold jewel named Berlokk, which was retrieved in a woman's grave along with two gold beads, two blue glass beads, a hairpin, ceramic, burnt bones, and two clips of bronze. Her tomb is dated to the Old Iron Age, around 0-400 A.D.

=== Gokstad Mound ===
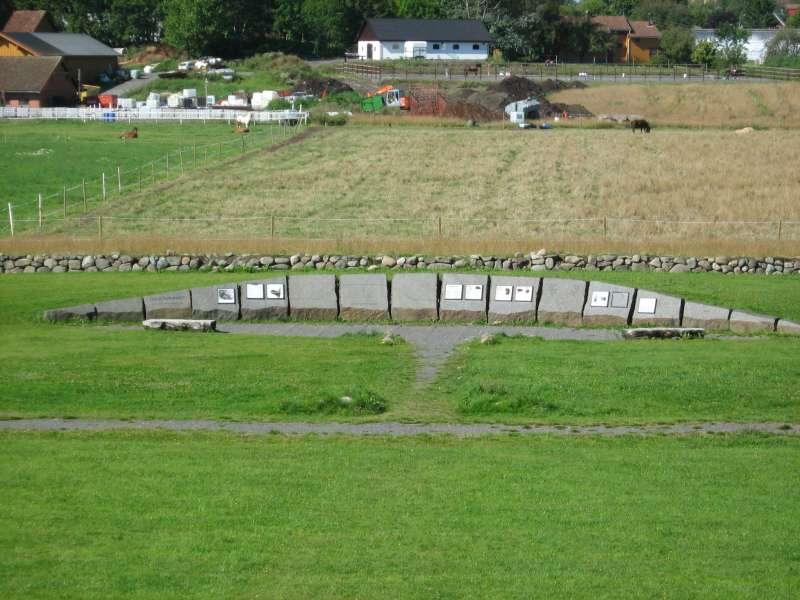
Interpretive signs at Gokstad Mound

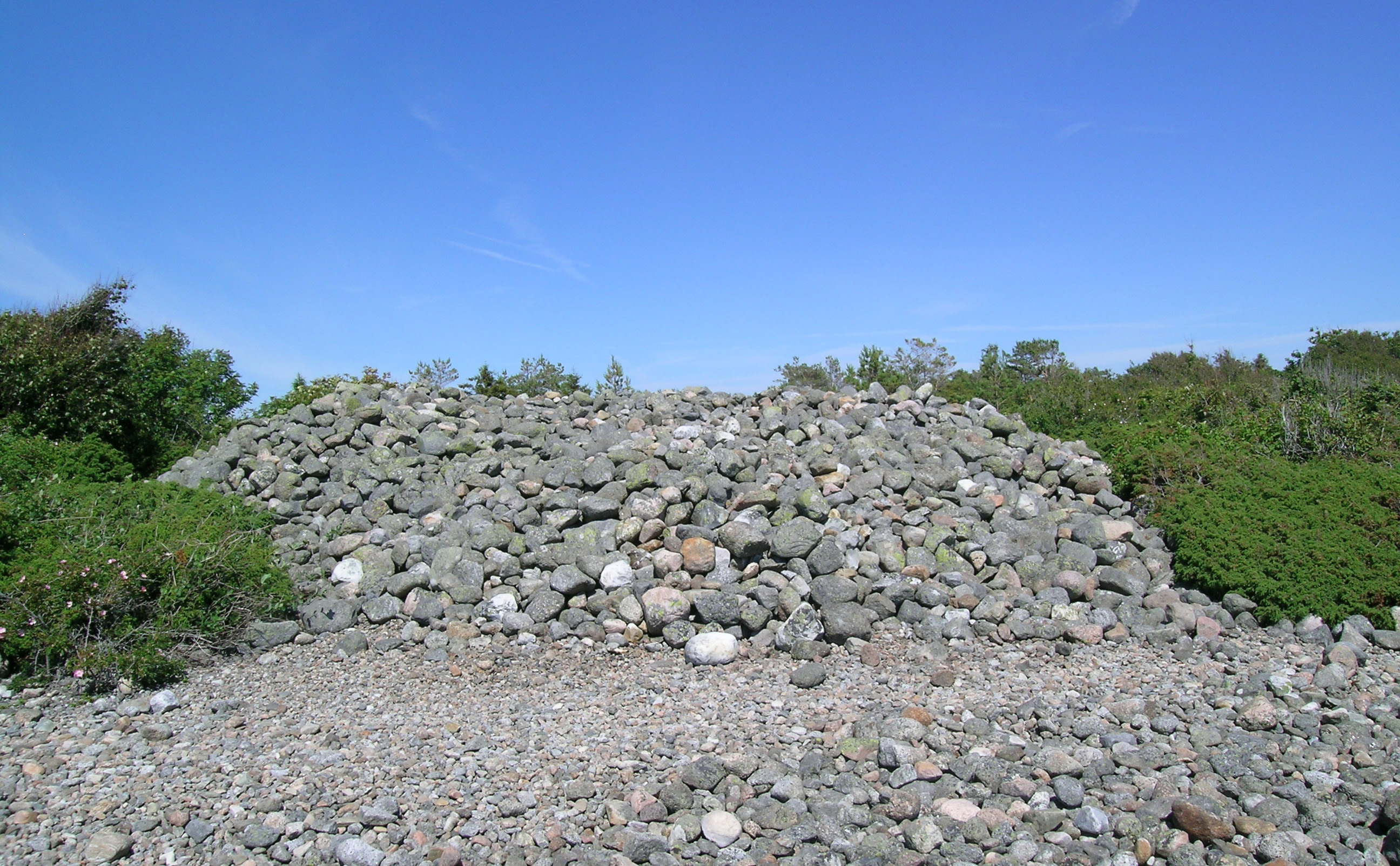
Burial mound at Mølen dated to the Bronze Age

Gokstad Mound in Sandefjord was where the Gokstad Ship was excavated by Nicolay Nicolaysen in 1880. The skeleton of a man was found in the ship, long believed to be Olaf Geirstad-Alf, former king of Vestfold and half-brother of Halfdan the Black, the father of Harald Fairhair, Norway's first king. However, recent discoveries have increased uncertainty and it therefore remains unknown what chieftain was buried at Gokstad.

The ship, which is the largest found in Norway, is currently located at the Viking Ship Museum in Oslo. The 23.8 metres (78 ft) ship was buried along with numerous gifts, including weapons, jewels, a gaming board, fish-hooks, 64 shields, six beds, three smaller boats and kitchen utensils. Twelve horses, eight dogs, two goshawks and two peacocks were also discovered in the grave.

Interpretive signs have been put up at the mound and Gaia, an exact replica of the Gokstad Ship, can be seen on Museum's Wharf at Sandefjord Harbor.

=== Mølen ===
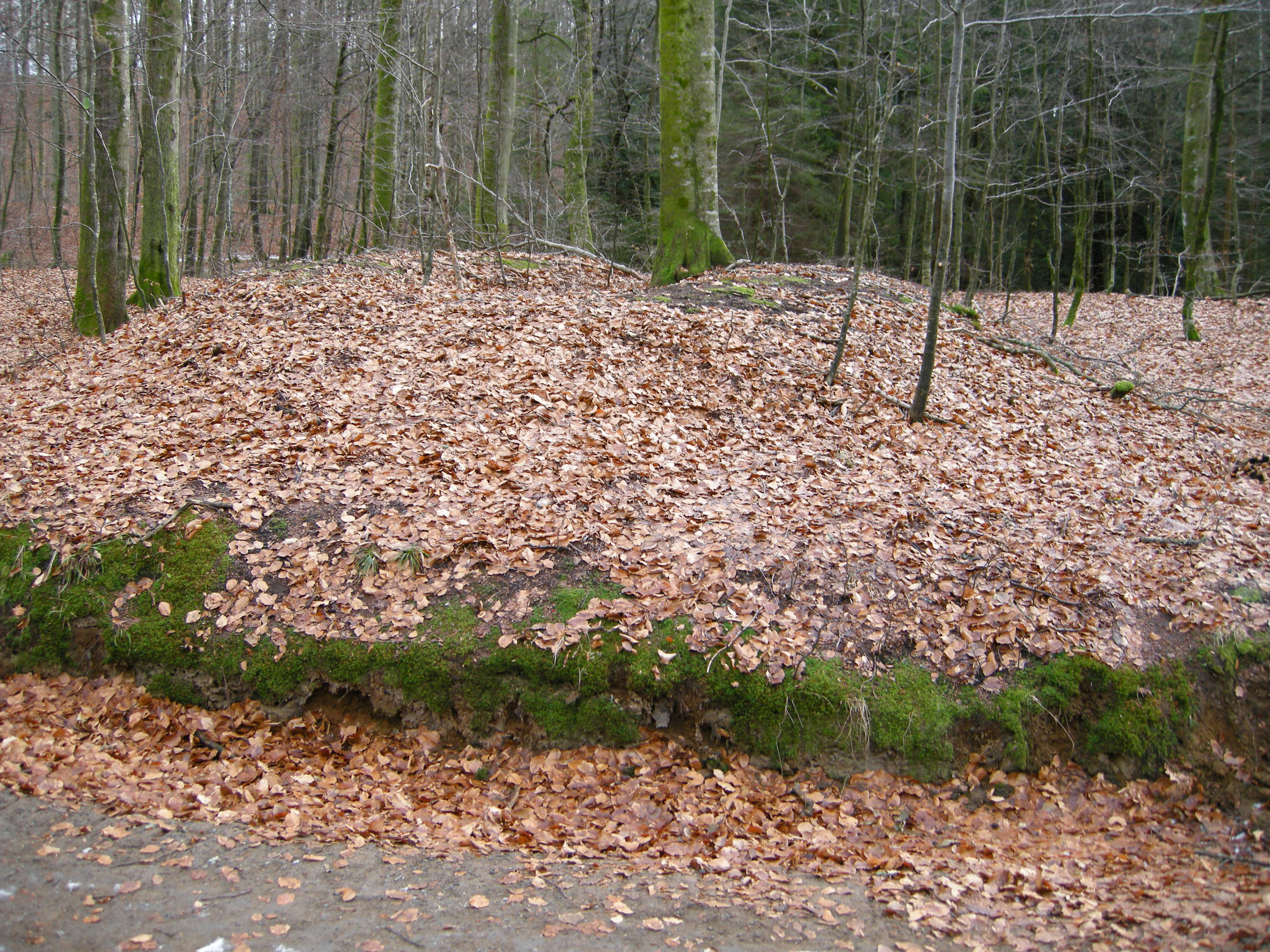
Bøkeskogen is home to one of Norway's largest burial grounds from the Iron Age.

The Old Norse word Mol translates to cairns, a site often used by ancient peoples to mark a burial site. Mølen, which is Norway's largest stone beach, is home to 230 cairns, which have been built over ages. Some cairns have been dated to 250 A.D. The isthmus of Mølen is home to stone piles, grave mounds, and stone settings, which are all part of a protected historic site. The last Ice Age pushed large amounts of gravel and stones ahead of it, and deposited it as a moraine through all of Vestfold, known as Vestfoldraet. Raet meets the ocean at Mølen, where the moraine sinks into the sea. Its encounter with the Skagerrak ocean waves has uncovered and polished the huge round stone floor for centuries.

=== Bøkeskogen ===
Besides being the largest beech tree forest in Norway, and the most northernmost beech tree forest in the world, Bøkeskogen is also an important archeological area. 83-90 burial mounds have been discovered in the forest. Some of these include the largest burial grounds from the Pre-Roman Iron Age in Vestfold County.

== Recreation ==
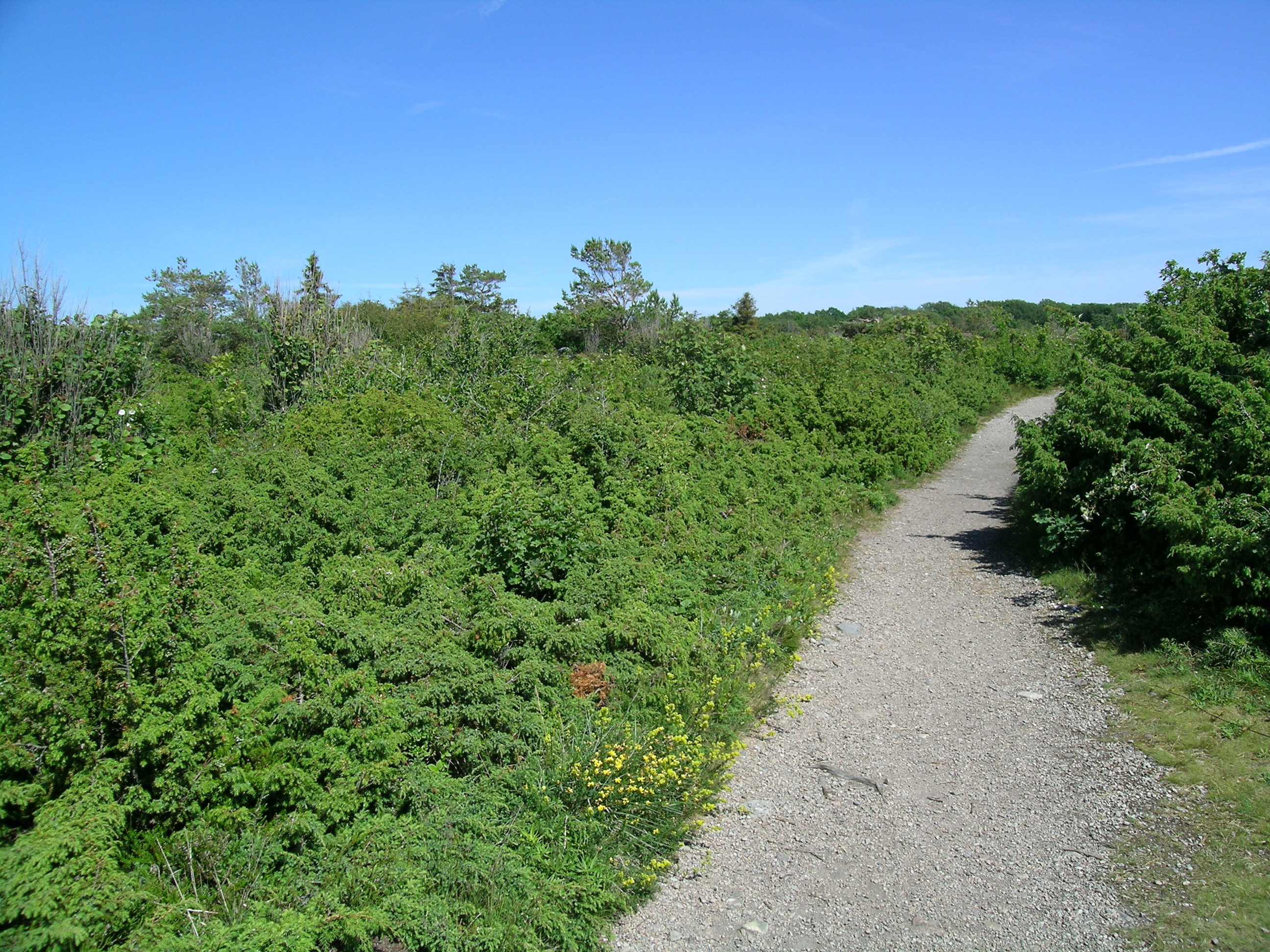
Hiking trail at Mølen GeoPark in Larvik Municipality

At least 238 kilometres (148 mi) of coastal hiking trails can be found in Vestfold County, from Larvik Municipality in the south to Svelvik in the north. Hiking trails are found throughout the county, including at World's End in Færder National Park. Furthermore, there is a 35 km (22 mi.) marked trail between Stavern and Helgeroa. Mølen, Kjærrafossen and Bøkeskogen are also home to various trails. Tønsberg Barrel, an old beacon dated to Sverris saga in the Middle Ages, sits at Yxnøy on Sandefjord's East Island. West Island is home to Folehavna Fort and additional trails. Combined, the trails on Sandefjord's East- and West Islands are 45 km (28 mi.), and a part of the international North Sea Trail. Bøkeskogen in Larvik Municipality is home to various trails, varying from 2.6 to 10 kilometres (1.6 to 6.2 mi) in length.

== Fauna ==
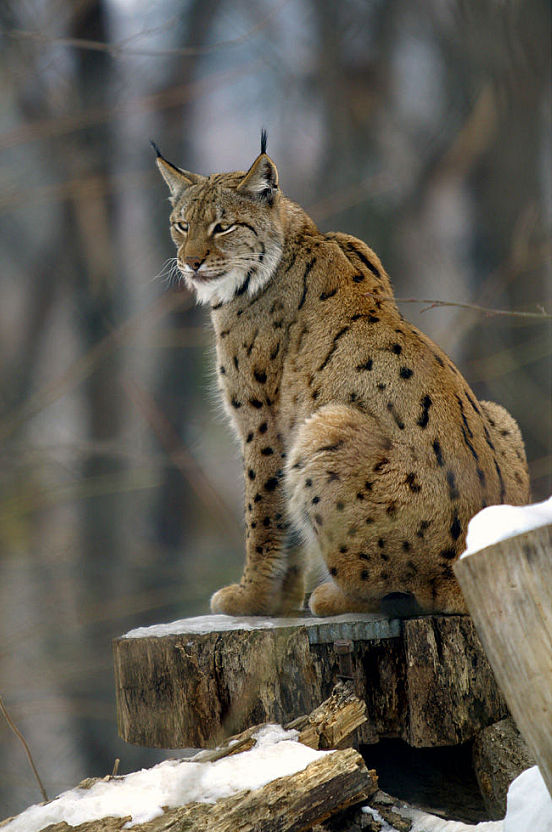
European Lynx is found throughout Vestfold, including Tønsberg and Sandefjord.

Vestfold's fauna includes species such as the White-tailed eagle, Roe deer, Moose, European hedgehog, Eurasian eagle-owl, Mountain hare, European badger, European pine marten, and Norway lemming. Rare observations of Gray wolf, European lynx, and Brown bear do occur. A wolf shot in Lardal Municipality in 2013 was the first wolf killed in the county in over 100 years. Between 700 and 800 moose are annually hunted in Vestfold. Larvik Municipality has one of the highest numbers of moose in Norway.

The Harbor seal is the most commonly observed species of seal in Vestfold, and it was estimated to be at minimum 183 seals in Vestfold as of August 2014. Dolphins are uncommon, however, a Common bottlenose dolphin was observed by Nøtterøy Municipality in 2014, and a Striped dolphin was observed the same summer at Helgeroa in Larvik Municipality.

Common European Viper is the only venomous snake found in Norway. There are two non-venomous snake species in Vestfold County: European grass snake and European smooth snake.

Vestfold has a rich avifauna: over 130 bird species have been observed in Svelvik Municipality, while Mølen in Larvik Municipality has the national record of 320 species.

=== Wildlife refuge ===
Saltstein is part of a protected habitat for birds. From 2014 surfing was permitted off Saltstein.

Besides being an UNESCO Global Geopark, Mølen in Larvik Municipality is a habitat for a variety of rare bird species. Mølen became a protected sanctuary for birds in 1970. 320 species of birds have been recorded at Mølen, more species than at any other site in Norway.

Wildlife preserves include Melsom- and Hemskilen Wildlife Preserves. Hemskilen Wildlife Preserve lies on the border between Larvik Municipality and Sandefjord Municipality and is an important habitat for shorebirds, geese, and Passerines. Melsom Plant- and Wildlife Preserve in Sandefjord is home to various older oaks, some of them home to as many as 1,500 different species of insects. Marøyskjæra Bird Preserve consists of two skerries west of Natholmen Island, which have been important nesting areas for Common tern and Common gull since the 1980s. Over 500 seagulls hatched on the islets in the 1990s.

== In popular culture ==
Although not filmed in Vestfold, the City of Tønsberg appears in the films Thor (2011) and also in Captain America: The First Avenger (2011), and in Avengers: Endgame.

Some films shot in Vestfold include:

- Den starkaste (1929), Sandefjord.
- Valfångare (1939), Sandefjord.
- Olsenbanden tar gull (1972), filmed in Stavern (Larvik Municipality) and Sande i Vestfold.
- Nonni and Manni (1988–89), Horten.
- Head Above Water (1993), filmed at Østerøya in Sandefjord.
- Baadshah (1999), Tønsberg.
- Deadline Torp (2005), movie based on the 1994 Torp hostage crisis, filmed in Sandefjord and Larvik.
- Christmas Blood ("Juleblod") (2017), Tønsberg and Sandefjord.
- Norway (2018), movie based on the 2011 Norway attacks, filmed in Tønsberg and Nøtterøy.
- Wisting (2018–2025), Larvik and Sandefjord.

== Gallery ==
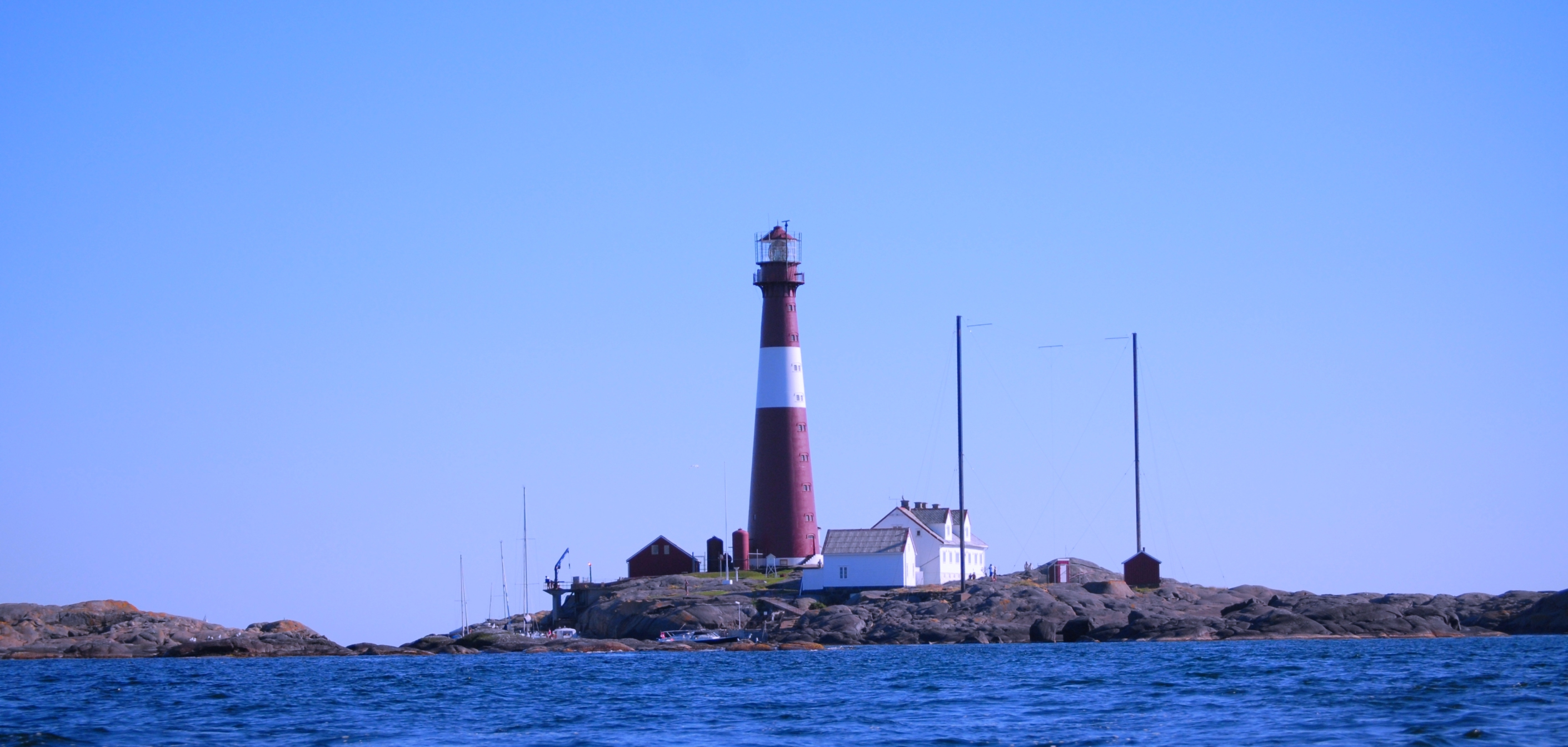
Færder National Park

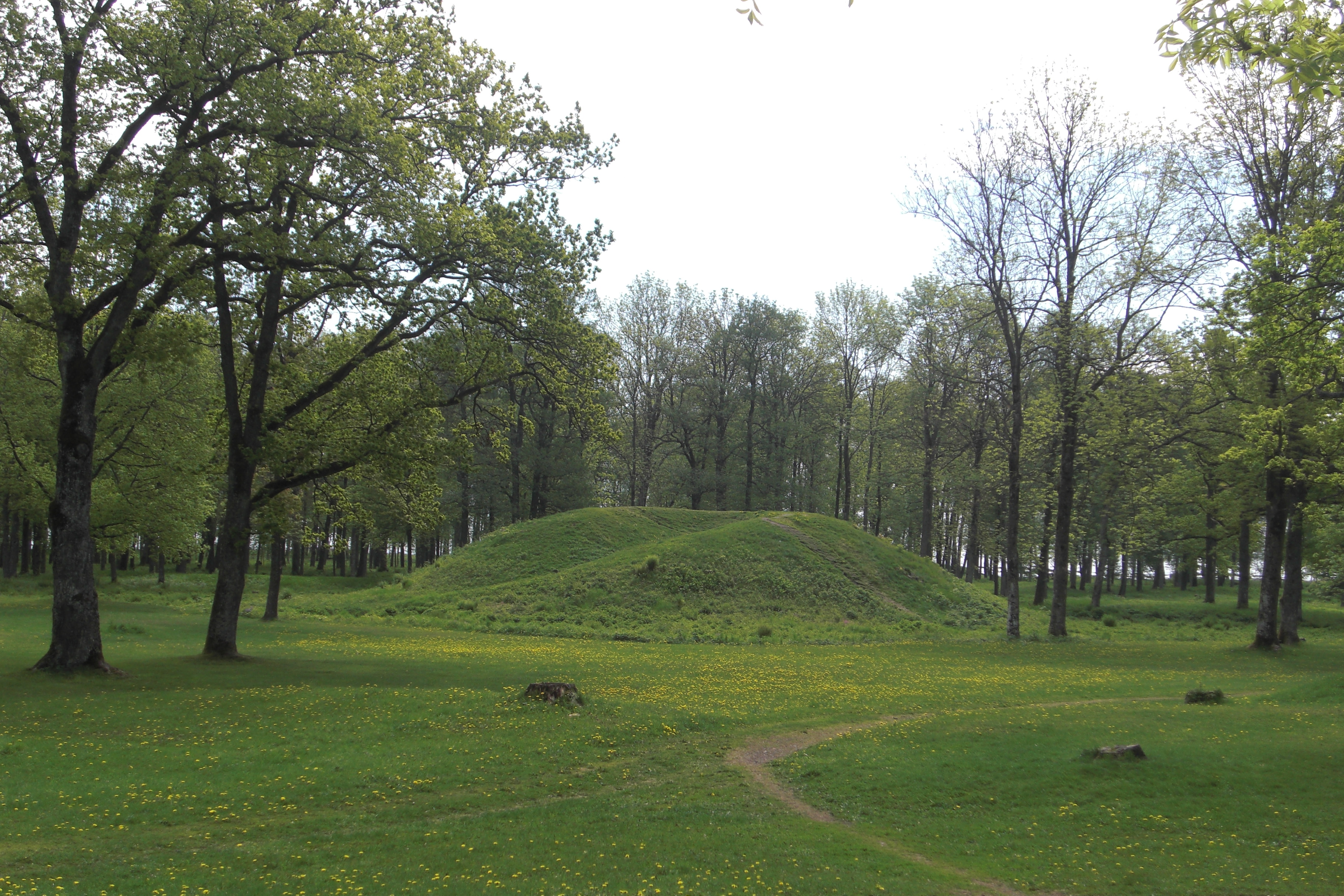
Borre National Park in Horten

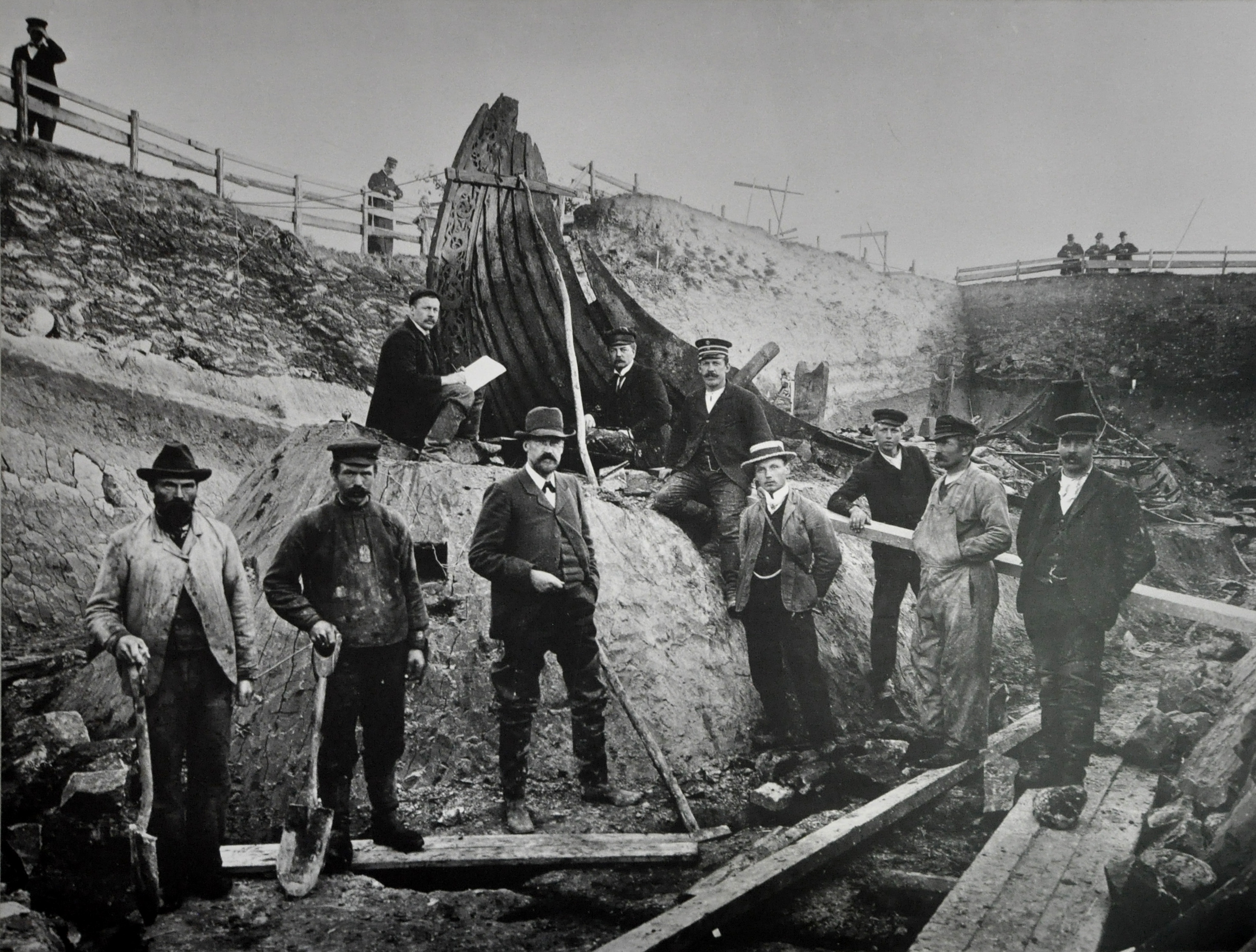
The Oseberg Ship was discovered in Tønsberg.

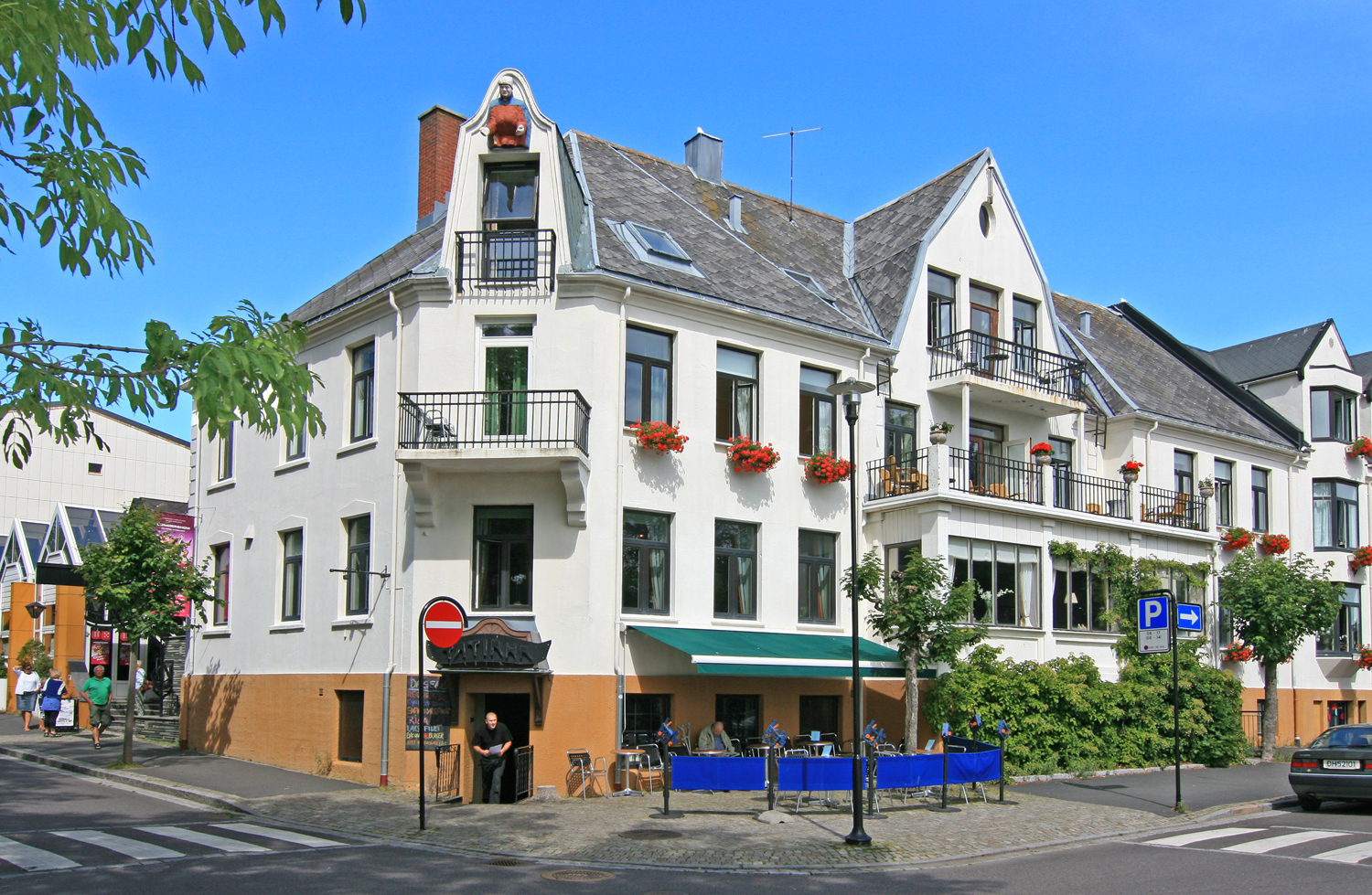
Town centre in Stavern

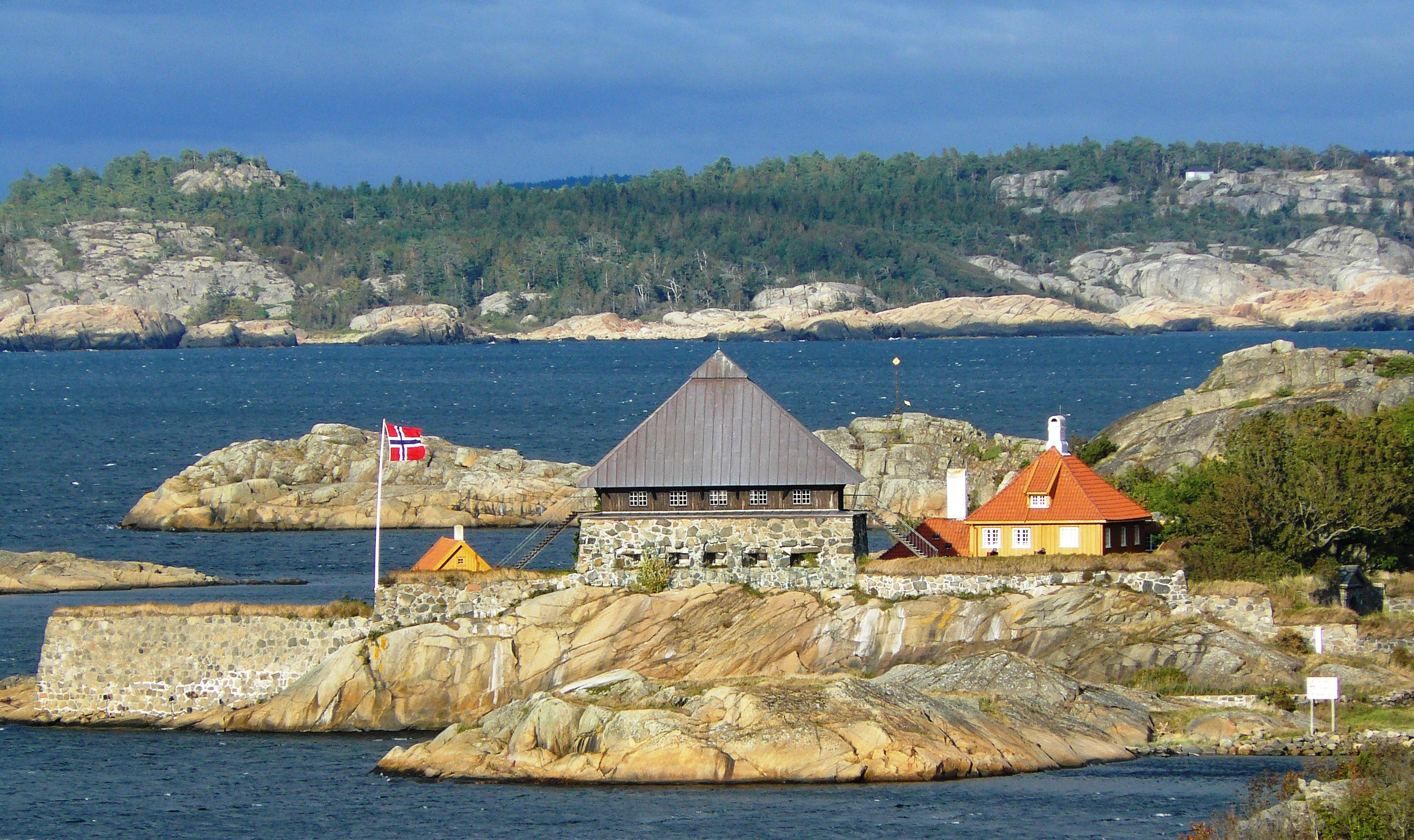
Citadellet, 19th-century fortress in Stavern

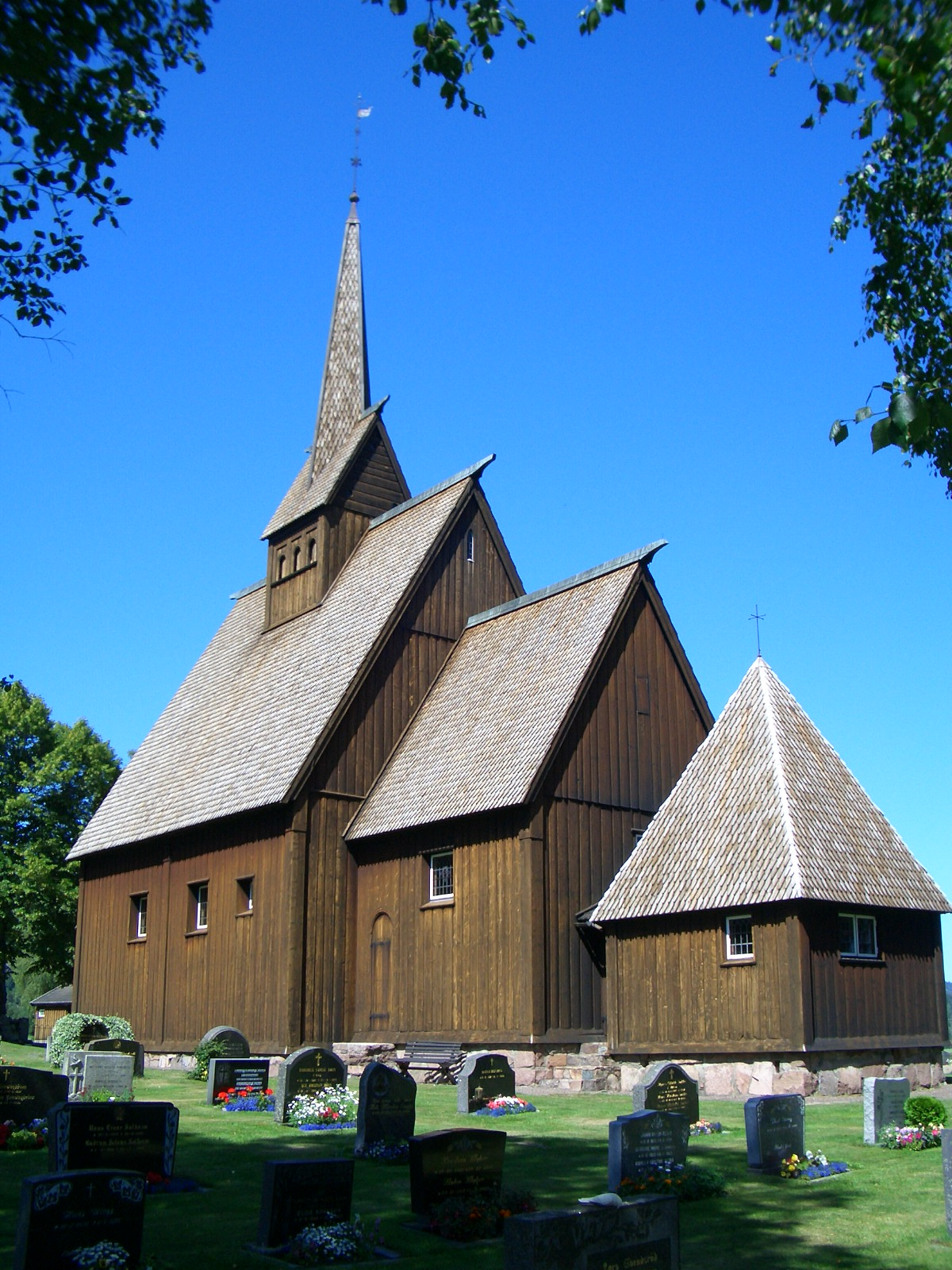
Høyjord Stave Church, only stave church left in Vestfold

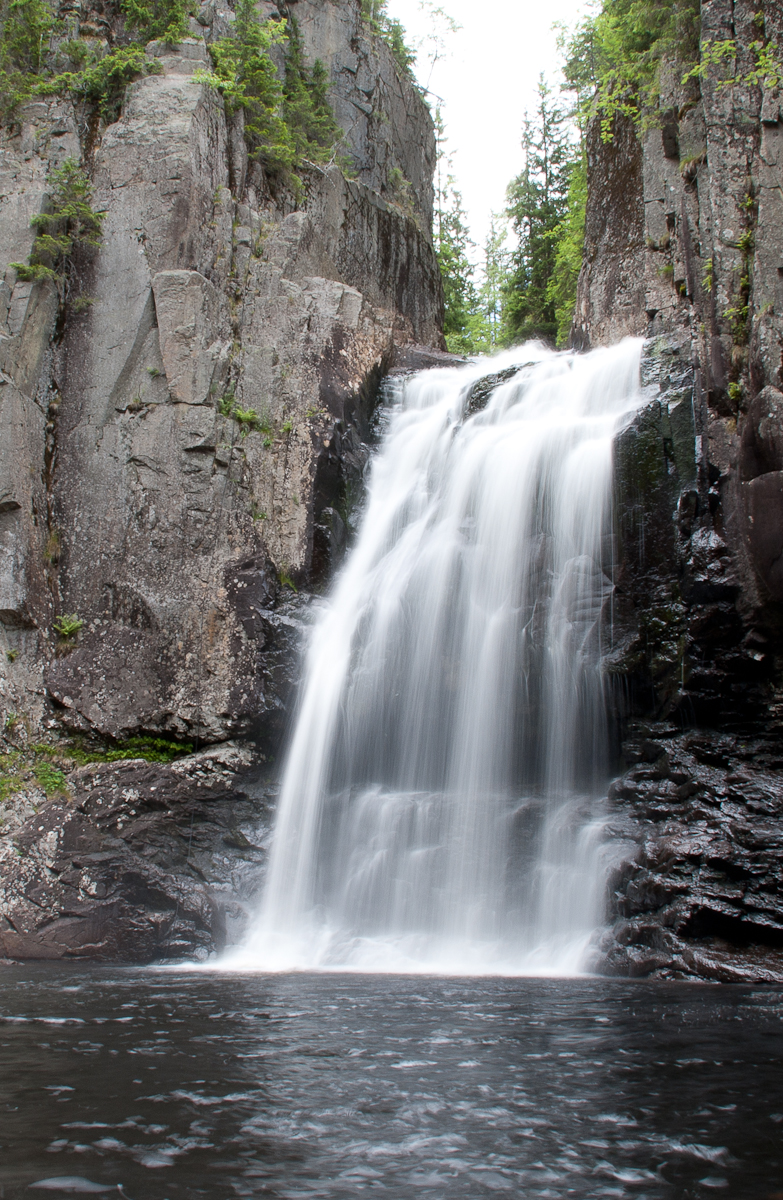
Trollfoss in Larvik Municipality, the tallest waterfall in Vestfold.
