= Tjøme Municipality =

Former municipality in Vestfold, Norway

Tjøme Municipality Tjøme kommune
- Former municipality
- Tjømø herred (historic name)
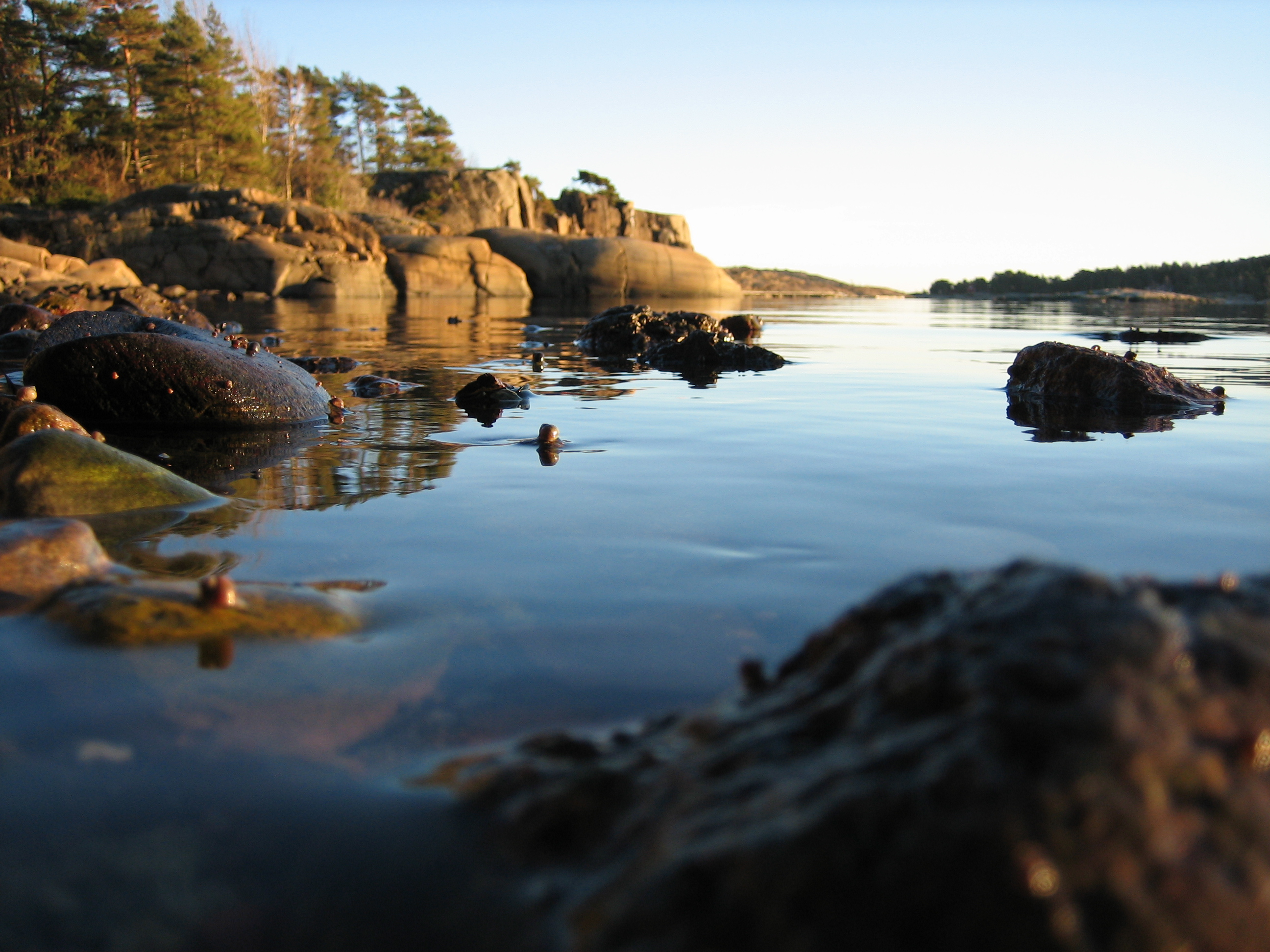

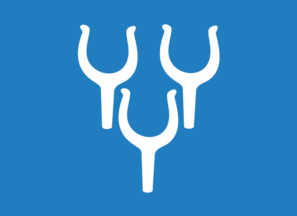
- Flag Coat of arms

- Vestfold within Norway

- Tjøme within Vestfold
- Coordinates: 59°7′16″N 10°23′57″E
- Country: Norway
- County: Vestfold
- Established: 1 Jan 1838
  - Created as: Formannskapsdistrikt
- Disestablished: 1 Jan 2018
  - Succeeded by: Færder Municipality
- Administrative centre: Tjøme

Government
  - Mayor (2015–2017): Bente Kleppe Bjerke (Ap)

Area (upon dissolution)
  - Total: 39.40 km^{2} (15.21 sq mi)
  - Land: 39.29 km^{2} (15.17 sq mi)
  - Water: 0.11 km^{2} (0.042 sq mi) 0.3%
  - Rank: #417 in Norway
- Highest elevation (Herkelås): 80.5 m (264 ft)

Population (2017)
  - Total: 4,928
  - Rank: #204 in Norway
  - Density: 125.4/km^{2} (325/sq mi)
  - Change (10 years): ▲ +9.7%
- Demonym: Tjømling

Official language
  - Norwegian form: Bokmål
- Time zone: UTC+01:00 (CET)
  - Summer (DST): UTC+02:00 (CEST)
- ISO 3166 code: NO-0723

Tjøme (Norwegian pronunciation: [ˈçœ̂mːə]) is a former municipality in Vestfold county, Norway. The 39.4-square-kilometre (15.2 sq mi) municipality existed from 1838 until its dissolution in 2018. The area is now part of Færder Municipality. The administrative centre was the village of Tjøme. Other villages in the municipality included Bjørnevåg, Grimestad, Hulebakk, Ormelet, Solvang, Sundene, and Svelvik.

Prior to its dissolution in 2018, the 39.4-square-kilometre (15.2 sq mi) municipality was the 417th largest by area out of the 426 municipalities in Norway. Tjøme Municipality was the 204th most populous municipality in Norway with a population of about 4,928. The municipality's population density was 125.4 inhabitants per square kilometre (325/sq mi) and its population had increased by 9.7% over the previous 10-year period.

The whole municipality was made up of a group of islands located to the south of Nøtterøy Municipality. The municipality included all of the island of Tjøme plus the smaller islands of Hvasser, Brøtsø, Hui, and Sandø. In addition to this, there were also about 475 smaller islands and skerries. The main island of Tjøme is the second-largest island in Vestfold County.

Tjøme was the childhood holiday destination for writer Roald Dahl.

== General information ==
=== Administrative history ===
The formannskapsdistrikt law of 1837 created a system of local government in Norway by establishing each town (ladested or kjøpstad) and each Church of Norway prestegjeld as a civil municipality. On 1 January 1838, Tjømø prestegjeld was established as Tjømø Municipality (later spelled Tjøme). The borders of the municipality did not change since that time (which is pretty rare among municipalities in Norway).

From 2017–2020, there were many municipal and county mergers across Norway due to the work of the Solberg cabinet. On 1 January 2018, Tjøme Municipality was dissolved and the following areas were merged to form the new Færder Municipality:

- all of Tjøme Municipality (population: 4,928)
- all of Nøtterøy Municipality (population: 21,748)

=== Name ===
The municipality is named after the old Tjøme prestegjeld. The prestegjeld was named after the island of Tjøme (Old Norse: Tjúma) since the first Tjøme Church was built there. The name is very old and its meaning is not certain. The name may be derived from the word taumr which means "bridle" or "rope", likely referring to the shape of the island.

Historically, the name of the municipality was spelled Tjømø. On 3 November 1917, a royal resolution changed the spelling of the name of the municipality to Tjøme.

=== Coat of arms ===
The coat of arms was granted on 17 February 1989. The official blazon is "Azure, three oarlocks argent, 2 over 1" (Norwegian: I blått tre sølv åregafler, 2-1). This means the arms have a blue field (background) and the charge is a set of three oarlocks. The charge has a tincture of argent which means it is commonly colored white, but if it is made out of metal, then silver is used. The blue color in the field symbolizes the importance of the sea for this island community. The oarlock was chosen as a symbol for the importance of fishing and trading for the municipality. There are three oarlocks to represent the three main islands: Tjøme, Hvasser, and Brøtsø. The arms were designed by Even Jarl Skoglund after winning a public competition to design the arms. The municipal flag has the same design as the coat of arms.

=== Churches ===
The Church of Norway had two parishes (sokn) within Tjøme Municipality. It was part of the Tønsberg domprosti (deanery) in the Diocese of Tunsberg.

Churches in Tjøme Municipality
Parish (sokn)	Church name	Location of the church	Year built
Hvasser	Hvasser Church	Hvasser	1903
Tjøme	Tjøme Church	Tjøme	1866

== Geography ==
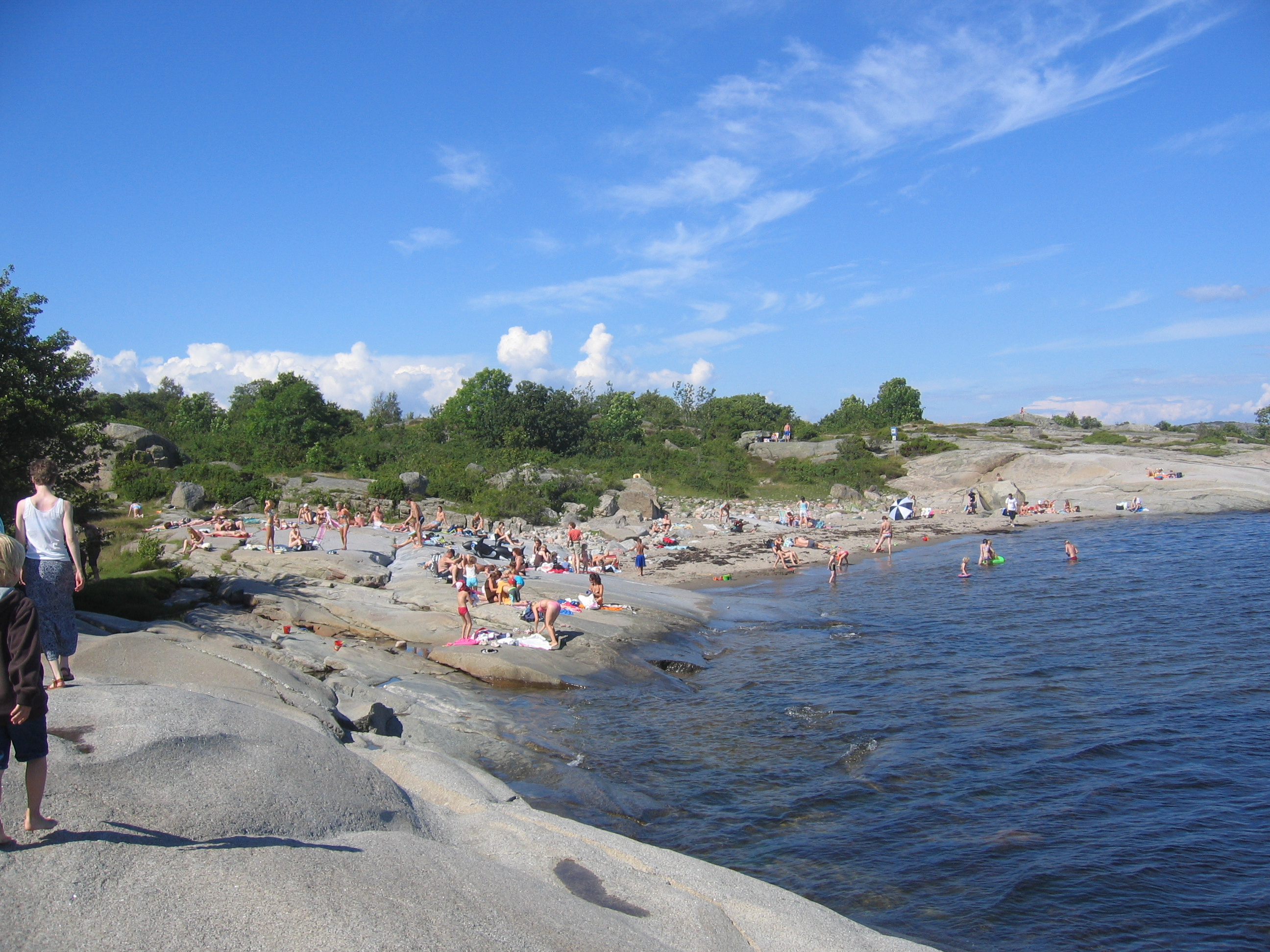
Tjøme Lilleskagen

Tjøme Municipality was completely located on islands between the Tønsbergfjorden and the Ytre Oslofjord. The main island being the island of Tjøme, where the municipal centre Kirkebygda is located. This village was also were the shops, schools, and restaurants were located. There are a few other central areas on the islands such as Hvasser, with active fishermen as well as the tourist industry for the travelers passing through. Hvasser has an icebar, shops, petrol station, and a number of places to buy food and supplies.

There were approximately 4,600 permanent residents in Tjøme Municipality, but in the summer months that number rose to around 40,000 inhabitants, including the Norwegian royal family who have a summer house on Tjøme. The reason for the extreme increase is mainly the sea sports available in the area and the remarkably good weather. Summers in Tjøme are both warm and sunny, and the beaches are filled with locals and tourists. Tjøme has been nicknamed Sommerøya (English: the summer island) because so many tourists, particularly from the Oslo area, visit the municipality.

Verdens Ende (English: World's End, or more figuratively, The End of the Earth) lies at the southern tip of Tjøme Island, and has for years been visited by tourists. Tjøme is also a great place for hiking, even though they are limited by the size of the island. The spectacular seaside scenery can be seen all year round. Færder Lighthouse and the Store Færder Lighthouse were both located in Tjøme Municipality.

The highest point in the municipality was the 80.5-metre (264 ft) tall mountain Herkelås on the island of Tjøme. Nøtterøy Municipality was located to the north, the Skagerrak was located to the east and south, and Sandefjord Municipality was located to the west.

== Government ==
While it existed, Tjøme Municipality was responsible for primary education (through 10th grade), outpatient health services, senior citizen services, welfare and other social services, zoning, economic development, and municipal roads and utilities. The municipality was governed by a municipal council of directly elected representatives. The mayor was indirectly elected by a vote of the municipal council. The municipality was under the jurisdiction of the Tønsberg District Court and the Agder Court of Appeal.

=== Municipal council ===
The municipal council (Kommunestyre) of Tjøme Municipality is made up of 19 representatives that are elected to four year terms. The tables below show the current and historical composition of the council by political party.

Tjøme kommunestyre 2015–2017
Party name (in Norwegian)	Number of representatives
Labour Party (Arbeiderpartiet)	6
Progress Party (Fremskrittspartiet)	4
Green Party (Miljøpartiet De Grønne)	2
Conservative Party (Høyre)	3
Liberal Party (Venstre)	2
Tjøme List (Tjømelista)	2
Total number of members:	19
Note: On 1 January 2018, Tjøme Municipality became part of Færder Municipality.

Tjøme kommunestyre 2011–2015
Party name (in Norwegian)	Number of representatives
Labour Party (Arbeiderpartiet)	6
Progress Party (Fremskrittspartiet)	4
Conservative Party (Høyre)	6
Liberal Party (Venstre)	2
Tjøme List (Tjømelista)	1
Total number of members:	19

Tjøme kommunestyre 2007–2011
Party name (in Norwegian)	Number of representatives
Labour Party (Arbeiderpartiet)	7
Progress Party (Fremskrittspartiet)	4
Conservative Party (Høyre)	3
Liberal Party (Venstre)	1
Tjøme List (Tjømelista)	4
Total number of members:	19

Tjøme kommunestyre 2003–2007
Party name (in Norwegian)	Number of representatives
Labour Party (Arbeiderpartiet)	6
Progress Party (Fremskrittspartiet)	6
Conservative Party (Høyre)	4
Tjøme List (Tjømelista)	3
Total number of members:	19

Tjøme kommunestyre 1999–2003
Party name (in Norwegian)	Number of representatives
Labour Party (Arbeiderpartiet)	8
Progress Party (Fremskrittspartiet)	3
Conservative Party (Høyre)	5
Christian Democratic Party (Kristelig Folkeparti)	1
Tjøme List (Tjømelista)	4
Total number of members:	21

Tjøme kommunestyre 1995–1999
Party name (in Norwegian)	Number of representatives
Labour Party (Arbeiderpartiet)	9
Progress Party (Fremskrittspartiet)	2
Conservative Party (Høyre)	6
Tjøme List (Tjomelista)	4
Total number of members:	21

Tjøme kommunestyre 1991–1995
Party name (in Norwegian)	Number of representatives
Labour Party (Arbeiderpartiet)	5
Progress Party (Fremskrittspartiet)	4
Conservative Party (Høyre)	6
Tjøme List (Tjømelista)	6
Total number of members:	21

Tjøme kommunestyre 1987–1991
Party name (in Norwegian)	Number of representatives
Labour Party (Arbeiderpartiet)	6
Progress Party (Fremskrittspartiet)	5
Conservative Party (Høyre)	7
Christian Democratic Party (Kristelig Folkeparti)	1
Non-Socialist common list (Ikke-sosialistiske felleslister)	4
Total number of members:	21

Tjøme kommunestyre 1983–1987
Party name (in Norwegian)	Number of representatives
Labour Party (Arbeiderpartiet)	6
Progress Party (Fremskrittspartiet)	4
Conservative Party (Høyre)	8
Christian Democratic Party (Kristelig Folkeparti)	1
Non-Socialist common list (Ikke-sosialistiske felleslister)	2
Total number of members:	21

Tjøme kommunestyre 1979–1983
Party name (in Norwegian)	Number of representatives
Labour Party (Arbeiderpartiet)	6
Progress Party (Fremskrittspartiet)	1
Conservative Party (Høyre)	10
Christian Democratic Party (Kristelig Folkeparti)	1
Socialist Left Party (Sosialistisk Venstreparti)	1
Non-Socialist common list (Ikke-sosialistiske felleslister)	2
Total number of members:	21

Tjøme kommunestyre 1975–1979
Party name (in Norwegian)	Number of representatives
Labour Party (Arbeiderpartiet)	8
Anders Lange's Party (Anders Langes parti)	1
Conservative Party (Høyre)	10
Christian Democratic Party (Kristelig Folkeparti)	1
New People's Party (Nye Folkepartiet)	1
Total number of members:	21

Tjøme kommunestyre 1971–1975
Party name (in Norwegian)	Number of representatives
Labour Party (Arbeiderpartiet)	10
Conservative Party (Høyre)	8
Christian Democratic Party (Kristelig Folkeparti)	1
Centre Party (Senterpartiet)	1
Liberal Party (Venstre)	1
Total number of members:	21

Tjøme kommunestyre 1967–1971
Party name (in Norwegian)	Number of representatives
Labour Party (Arbeiderpartiet)	9
Conservative Party (Høyre)	10
Christian Democratic Party (Kristelig Folkeparti)	1
Centre Party (Senterpartiet)	1
Total number of members:	21

Tjøme kommunestyre 1963–1967
Party name (in Norwegian)	Number of representatives
Labour Party (Arbeiderpartiet)	9
Conservative Party (Høyre)	11
Christian Democratic Party (Kristelig Folkeparti)	1
Total number of members:	21

Tjøme herredsstyre 1959–1963
Party name (in Norwegian)	Number of representatives
Labour Party (Arbeiderpartiet)	9
Conservative Party (Høyre)	10
Christian Democratic Party (Kristelig Folkeparti)	1
Centre Party (Senterpartiet)	1
Total number of members:	21

Tjøme herredsstyre 1955–1959
Party name (in Norwegian)	Number of representatives
Labour Party (Arbeiderpartiet)	8
Christian Democratic Party (Kristelig Folkeparti)	2
Joint List(s) of Non-Socialist Parties (Borgerlige Felleslister)	11
Total number of members:	21

Tjøme herredsstyre 1951–1955
Party name (in Norwegian)	Number of representatives
Labour Party (Arbeiderpartiet)	7
Farmers' Party (Bondepartiet)	1
Joint List(s) of Non-Socialist Parties (Borgerlige Felleslister)	12
Total number of members:	20

Tjøme herredsstyre 1947–1951
Party name (in Norwegian)	Number of representatives
Labour Party (Arbeiderpartiet)	6
Joint List(s) of Non-Socialist Parties (Borgerlige Felleslister)	14
Total number of members:	20

Tjøme herredsstyre 1945–1947
Party name (in Norwegian)	Number of representatives
Labour Party (Arbeiderpartiet)	6
Joint List(s) of Non-Socialist Parties (Borgerlige Felleslister)	14
Total number of members:	20

Tjøme herredsstyre 1937–1940*
Party name (in Norwegian)	Number of representatives
Labour Party (Arbeiderpartiet)	3
Joint List(s) of Non-Socialist Parties (Borgerlige Felleslister)	16
Local List(s) (Lokale lister)	1
Total number of members:	20
Note: Due to the German occupation of Norway during World War II, no elections were held for new municipal councils until after the war ended in 1945.

=== Mayors ===
The mayor (Norwegian: ordfører) of Tjøme Municipality was the political leader of the municipality and the chairperson of the municipal council. The following people have held this position:

- 1838–1839: Hans L. Bache
- 1840–1843: Lars O. Bockelie
- 1844–1845: Christen Torbjørnsen
- 1846–1847: Anders Torbjørnsen
- 1848–1851: Lars O. Bockelie
- 1852–1853: Johannes O. Rød
- 1854–1857: Torger J. Bache
- 1858–1859: Arnt C. Jacobsen
- 1860–1863: Thomas Reiersen
- 1864–1867: Torger J. Bache
- 1868–1869: A. Munthe Kaas
- 1870–1871: P.S. Norstrøm
- 1872–1873: Thore J. Ness
- 1874–1875: P. A. Poulsen
- 1876–1877: Lars H. Bache
- 1878–1885: O.L. Røed
- 1886–1893: Johannes von der Lippe
- 1894–1897: L.S. Guttormsen
- 1898–1898: Oscar Bjørnskaug
- 1899–1910: B.S. Iversen
- 1911–1916: Hans Larsen Bache (H)
- 1917–1920: E.M. Olsen
- 1921–1923: Lars Iversen
- 1923–1930: Hans Larsen Bache (H)
- 1930–1937: Wilhelm Sundene (H)
- 1938–1941: Christen R. Granøe (H)
- 1941–1941: Håkon Sverre Olsen Holme
- 1941–1945: Brynjulf Wiese (NS)
- 1945–1947: Christen R. Granøe (H)
- 1948–1951: Carl Aarø (H)
- 1952–1960: Alf Lysgaard (H)
- 1960–1962: Carl Aarø (H)
- 1962–1971: Arne Stenli (H)
- 1972–1975: Julie Caspersen (H)
- 1975–1983: Egil Jahre (H)
- 1983–1991: Ola Ingar Gjertsen (H)
- 1991–2003: Roar Tandberg (Ap)
- 2003–2007: Per Hotvedt Nielsen (FrP)
- 2007–2011: Bente Kleppe Bjerke (Ap)
- 2011–2015: John Marthiniussen (H)
- 2015–2017: Bente Kleppe Bjerke (Ap)

== See also ==
- List of former municipalities of Norway
