= Færder Municipality =

Municipality in Vestfold, Norway

Færder Municipality Færder kommune
- Municipality
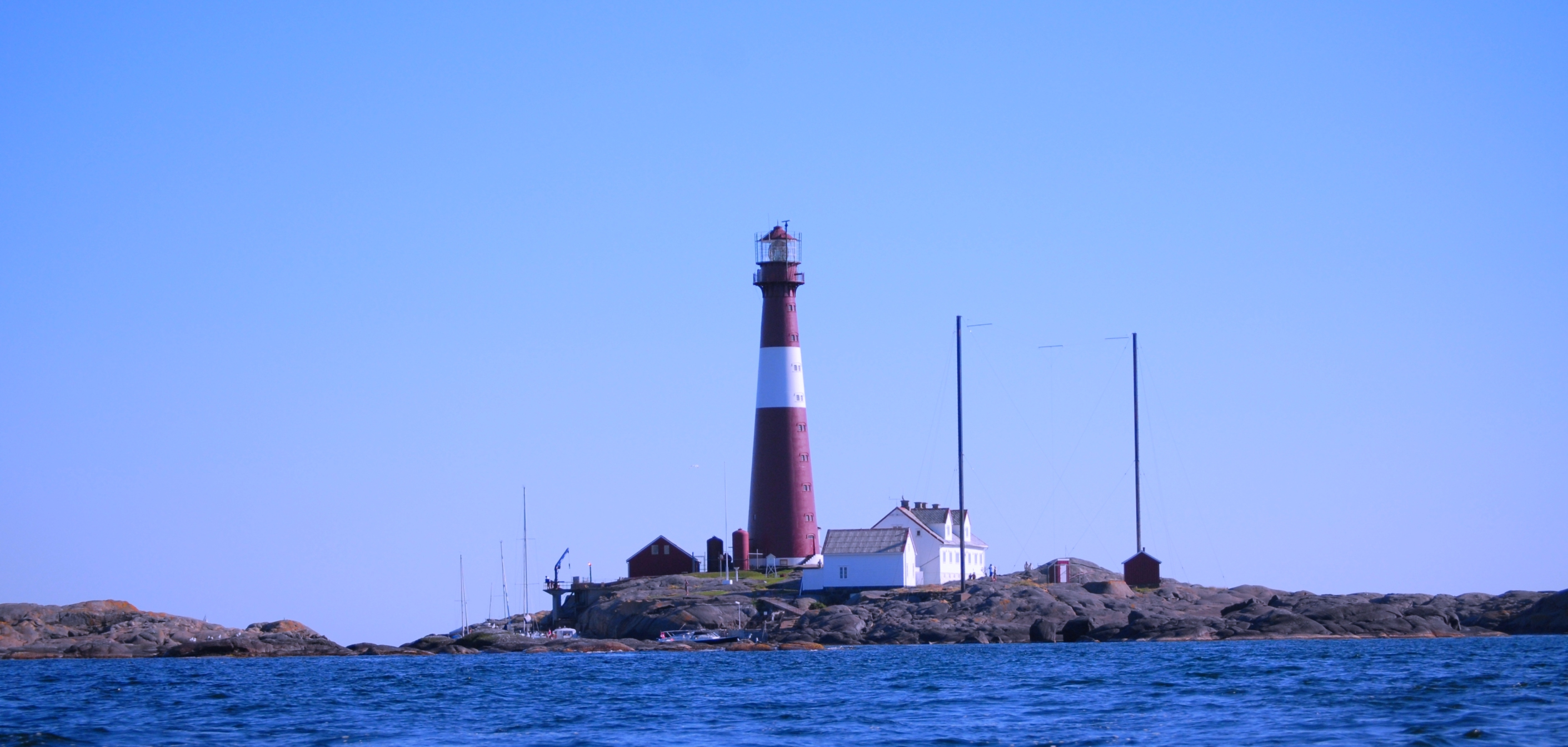
- View of the Færder Lighthouse

- Coat of arms

- Vestfold within Norway

- Færder within Vestfold
- Coordinates: 59.17°N 10.40°E
- Country: Norway
- County: Vestfold
- Established: 1 Jan 2018
  - Preceded by: Nøtterøy Municipality & Tjøme Municipality
- Administrative centre: Borgheim

Government
  - Mayor (2023): Tom Mello (H)

Area
  - Total: 99.95 km^{2} (38.59 sq mi)
  - Land: 99.72 km^{2} (38.50 sq mi)
  - Water: 0.23 km^{2} (0.089 sq mi) 0.2%
  - Rank: #330 in Norway
- Highest elevation (Vetan): 100.05 m (328.2 ft)

Population (2026)
  - Total: 27,743
  - Rank: #44 in Norway
  - Density: 278.2/km^{2} (721/sq mi)
  - Change (10 years): ▲ +4.3%
- Demonym(s): Færding; Færdermann; Færderkvinne

Official language
  - Norwegian form: Neutral
- Time zone: UTC+01:00 (CET)
  - Summer (DST): UTC+02:00 (CEST)
- ISO 3166 code: NO-3911
- Website: Official website

Færder (Norwegian pronunciation: [ˈfæːɾdəɾ]; locally [ˈfæːɽəɾ]) is a municipality in Vestfold county, Norway. It is located in the traditional district of Vestfold. The administrative centre of the municipality is the village of Borgheim. Other villages in the municipality include Årøysund, Bjørnevåg, Buerstad, Duken, Glomstein, Grimestad, Hårkollen, Hulebakk, Kjøpmannskjær, Nesbrygga, Ormelet, Oterbekk, Skallestad, Skjerve, Solvang, Strengsdal, Sundene, Svelvik, Tenvik, Tjøme, Torød, Vestskogen, and Vollen.

The 99.95-square-kilometre (38.59 sq mi) municipality is the 330th largest by area out of the 357 municipalities in Norway. Færder Municipality is the 44th most populous municipality in Norway with a population of 27,743. The municipality's population density is 278.2 inhabitants per square kilometre (721/sq mi) and its population has increased by 4.3% over the previous 10-year period.

The Færder National Park, which was established in 2013, comprises islands and sea area east of the municipality. The main visitors' centre for the park is located at Verdens Ende at the southern tip of the island of Tjøme.

== General information ==
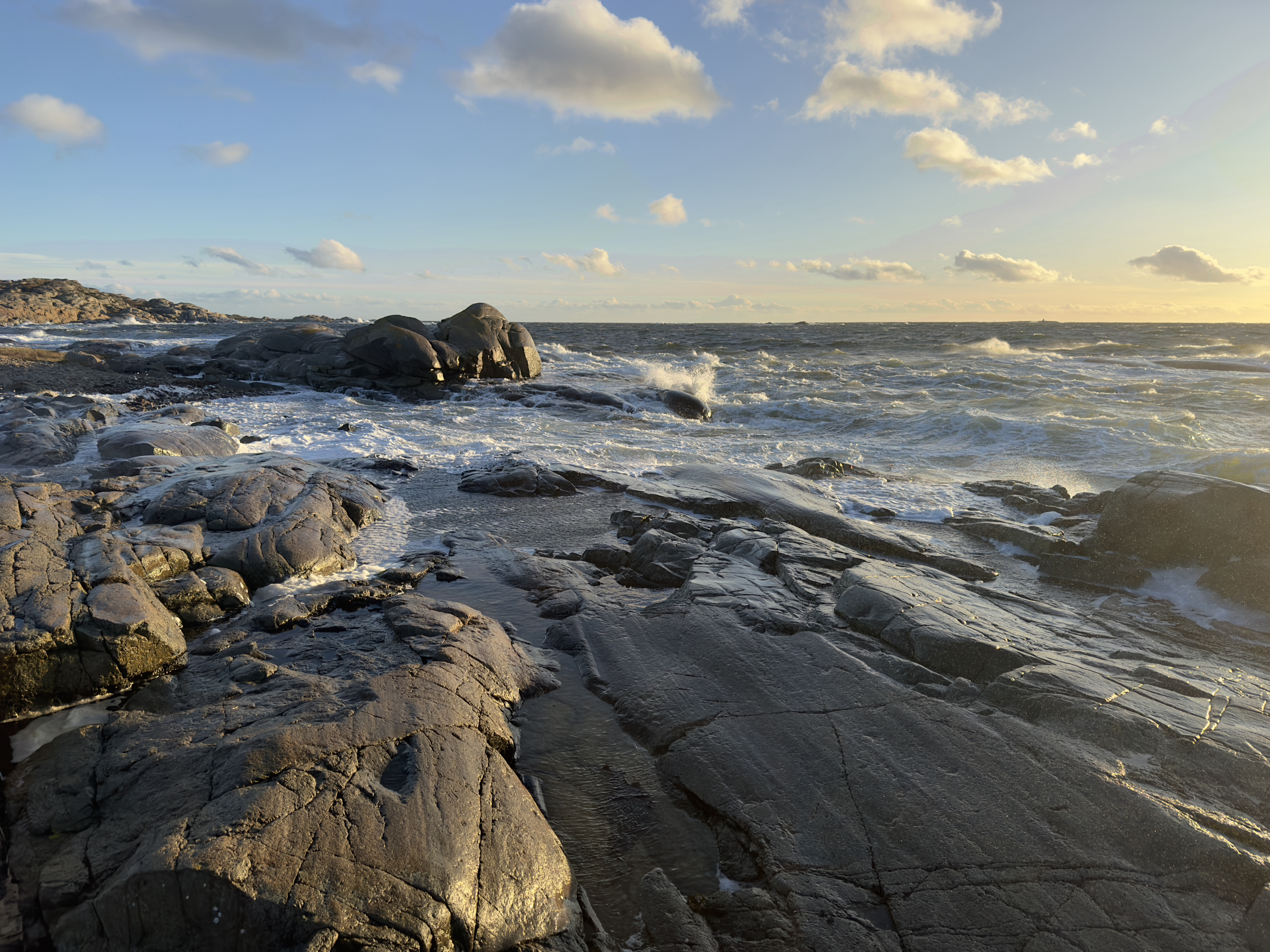
View of the Færder coastline

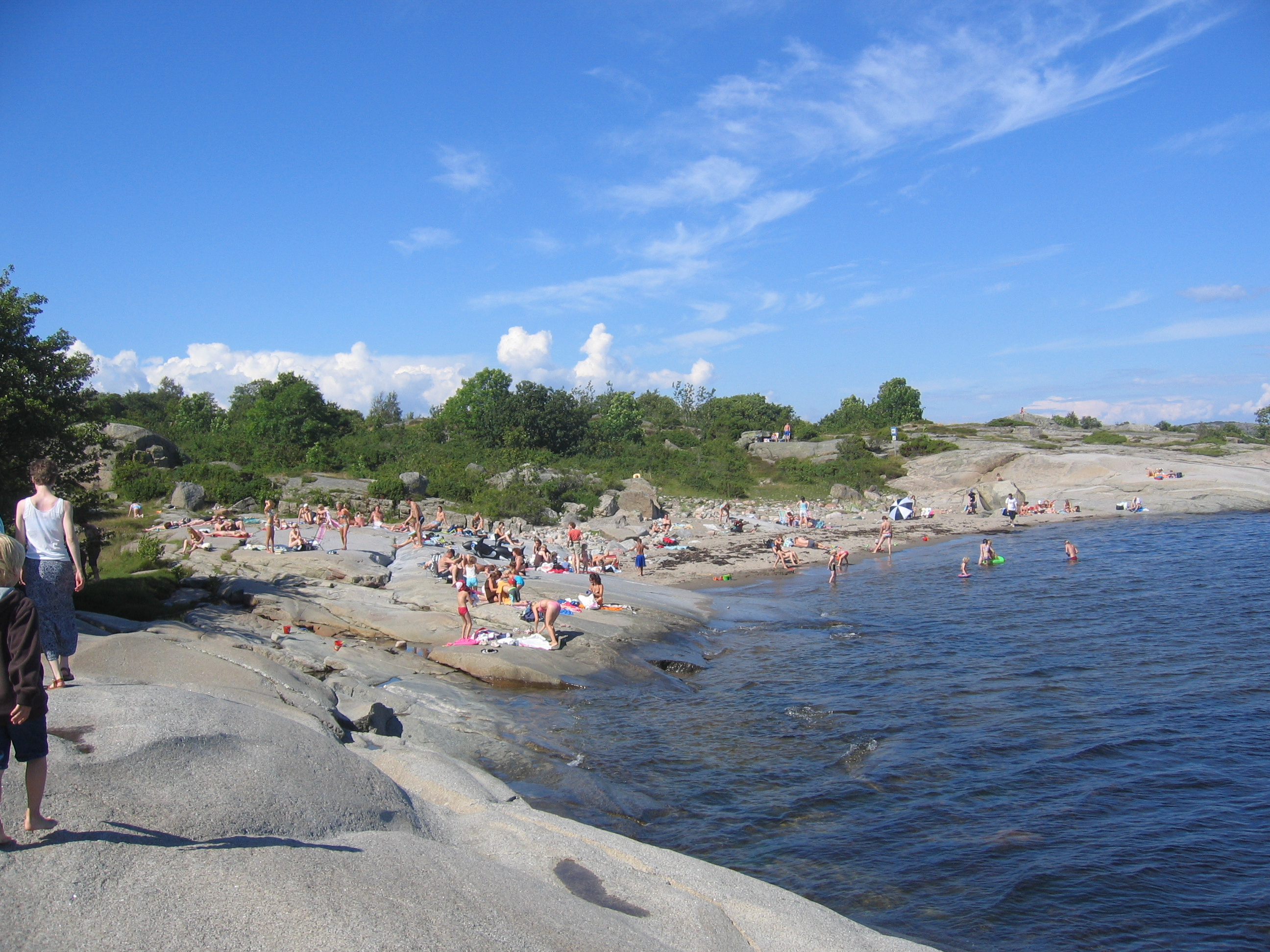
Beach area on the island of Tjøme

=== Administrative history ===
The municipality of Færder was established on 1 January 2018 when Nøtterøy Municipality (population: 21,748) and Tjøme Municipality (population: 4,928) were both dissolved and merged together to form the new Færder Municipality. The borders of the municipality have not changed since that time.

In 2020, there were many municipal and county mergers across Norway due to the work of the Solberg cabinet. Historically, this municipality was part of Vestfold county. On 1 January 2020, the municipality became a part of the newly-formed Vestfold og Telemark county (after Telemark and Vestfold counties were merged). The merger was shortlived, and on 1 January 2024, the merger was undone and this municipality became part of Vestfold county once again.

=== Name ===
The municipality is named after the small Færder island (Old Norse: Fjarðarøy) since the Store Færder Lighthouse was built there. The current spelling of the first element of the name is a corruption of the genitive case of the old word fjǫrðr which means "fjord". The last element is øy which means "island".

=== Coat of arms ===
The coat of arms was adopted for use starting on 1 January 2018 when the municipality was established. The official blazon is "Azure, a sail argent" (Norwegian: Sølv fokk på blå grunn). This means the arms have a blue field (background) and the charge is a jibsail. The sail has a tincture of argent which means it is commonly colored white, but if it is made out of metal, then silver is used. The blue color in the field and the sail were chosen to represent the maritime traditions for this island municipality. The arms were designed by the 17-year-old Jon Markus Ringøen, a student from the municipality. The municipal flag has the same design as the coat of arms.

=== Churches ===
The Church of Norway has five parishes (sokn) within Færder Municipality. It is part of the Tønsberg domprosti (deanery) in the Diocese of Tunsberg.

Churches in Færder Municipality
Parish (sokn)	Church name	Location of the church	Year built
Hvasser	Hvasser Church	Hvasser	1903
Nøtterøy	Nøtterøy Church	Borgheim	c. 1100
Nøtterøy	Veierland Church	Veierland	1905
Teie	Teie Church	Teie	1977
Tjøme	Tjøme Church	Tjøme	1866
Torød	Torød Church	Torød	1915

== Geography ==
The 100-square-kilometre (39 sq mi) municipality is entirely composed of islands between the Tønsbergfjorden and the Ytre Oslofjord. Some of the main islands include Nøtterøy, Tjøme, Hvasser, Føynland, Veierland, and Bolærne. Three lighthouses are notable in the area: Færder Lighthouse, Fulehuk Lighthouse, and Store Færder Lighthouse. The highest point in the municipality is the 100.05-metre (328.2 ft) tall mountain Vetan on the island of Nøtterøy.

Tønsberg Municipality is located to the north, the Skagerrak is located to the east and south, and Sandefjord Municipality is located to the west.

== Government ==
Færder Municipality is responsible for primary education (through 10th grade), outpatient health services, senior citizen services, welfare and other social services, zoning, economic development, and municipal roads and utilities. The municipality is governed by a municipal council of directly elected representatives. The mayor is indirectly elected by a vote of the municipal council. The municipality is under the jurisdiction of the Vestfold District Court and the Agder Court of Appeal.

=== Municipal council ===
The municipal council (Kommunestyre) of Færder Municipality is made up of 39 representatives that are elected to four year terms. The tables below show the current and historical composition of the council by political party.

Færder kommunestyre 2023–2027
Party name (in Norwegian)	Number of representatives
Labour Party (Arbeiderpartiet)	12
Progress Party (Fremskrittspartiet)	4
Green Party (Miljøpartiet De Grønne)	2
Conservative Party (Høyre)	12
Industry and Business Party (Industri‑ og Næringspartiet)	2
Christian Democratic Party (Kristelig Folkeparti)	1
Centre Party (Senterpartiet)	1
Liberal Party (Venstre)	1
Joint list of the Red Party (Rødt) and the Socialist Left Party (Sosialistisk Venstreparti)	4
Total number of members:	39

Færder kommunestyre 2019–2023
Party name (in Norwegian)	Number of representatives
Labour Party (Arbeiderpartiet)	9
Progress Party (Fremskrittspartiet)	4
Green Party (Miljøpartiet De Grønne)	4
Conservative Party (Høyre)	10
Christian Democratic Party (Kristelig Folkeparti)	1
Centre Party (Senterpartiet)	5
Socialist Left Party (Sosialistisk Venstreparti)	4
Liberal Party (Venstre)	2
Total number of members:	39

Færder kommunestyre 2018–2019
Party name (in Norwegian)	Number of representatives
Labour Party (Arbeiderpartiet)	12
Progress Party (Fremskrittspartiet)	6
Green Party (Miljøpartiet De Grønne)	2
Conservative Party (Høyre)	16
Christian Democratic Party (Kristelig Folkeparti)	2
Centre Party (Senterpartiet)	2
Liberal Party (Venstre)	3
Joint list of the Red Party (Rødt) and the Socialist Left Party (Sosialistisk Venstreparti)	4
Total number of members:	47
Note: Færder Municipality was established on 1 January 2018 when Nøtterøy Municipality and Tjøme Municipality were merged. The first municipal council was a combination of the 2 preceding municipal councils from Nøtterøy and Tjøme.

=== Mayors ===
The mayor (Norwegian: ordfører) of Færder Municipality is the political leader of the municipality and the chairperson of the municipal council. The following people have held this position:

- 2018–2019: Roar Jonstang (H)
- 2019–2023: Jon Sanness Andersen (Ap)
- 2023–present: Tom Mello (H)

== Climate ==
Færder Lighthouse has one of the longest temperature records in Norway, with recording from the same location continuously since 1885. The 1991-2020 base period shows a temperate oceanic climate (Cfb). Færder is known in Norway for warm lows in summer; from the start of recording to summer 2020 Færder recorded 191 nights with lows 20 °C (68 °F) or warmer. The all-time high temperature 28 °C (82 °F) was recorded July 1955 and August 1947; the all-time low is −23 °C (−9 °F) recorded in January 1942.

Climate data for Færder lighthouse 1991-2020 (6 m, precipitation days 1961-90, extremes 1885-2020)
Month	Jan	Feb	Mar	Apr	May	Jun	Jul	Aug	Sep	Oct	Nov	Dec	Year
Record high °C (°F)	10.7 (51.3)	11.1 (52.0)	17.9 (64.2)	17.5 (63.5)	26 (79)	27.7 (81.9)	28 (82)	28 (82)	24.3 (75.7)	19 (66)	14.5 (58.1)	12.2 (54.0)	28 (82)
Mean daily maximum °C (°F)	2.7 (36.9)	2.1 (35.8)	4.1 (39.4)	8.2 (46.8)	13.5 (56.3)	17.5 (63.5)	19.8 (67.6)	19.5 (67.1)	15.8 (60.4)	11 (52)	7 (45)	4.2 (39.6)	10.5 (50.9)
Daily mean °C (°F)	1 (34)	0.3 (32.5)	2.2 (36.0)	5.9 (42.6)	11 (52)	15 (59)	17.6 (63.7)	17.5 (63.5)	14 (57)	9.4 (48.9)	5.5 (41.9)	2.6 (36.7)	8.5 (47.3)
Mean daily minimum °C (°F)	−0.5 (31.1)	−1 (30)	0.8 (33.4)	4.4 (39.9)	9.1 (48.4)	13.2 (55.8)	15.9 (60.6)	15.8 (60.4)	12.5 (54.5)	7.9 (46.2)	4.1 (39.4)	1 (34)	6.9 (44.5)
Record low °C (°F)	−23 (−9)	−20.8 (−5.4)	−19.5 (−3.1)	−11 (12)	−1.4 (29.5)	1.4 (34.5)	6.7 (44.1)	7.4 (45.3)	1.2 (34.2)	−3.3 (26.1)	−9.5 (14.9)	−18 (0)	−23 (−9)
Average precipitation mm (inches)	60.8 (2.39)	38.9 (1.53)	38.4 (1.51)	40.2 (1.58)	53.1 (2.09)	51.9 (2.04)	53.6 (2.11)	88.6 (3.49)	73.1 (2.88)	92.7 (3.65)	83.9 (3.30)	66 (2.6)	741.2 (29.17)
Average precipitation days (≥ 1.0 mm)	9	7	8	7	8	7	7	9	10	11	11	8	102
Source 1: Norwegian Meteorological Institute
Source 2: NOAA – WMO averages 91-2020 Norway

== Notable people ==
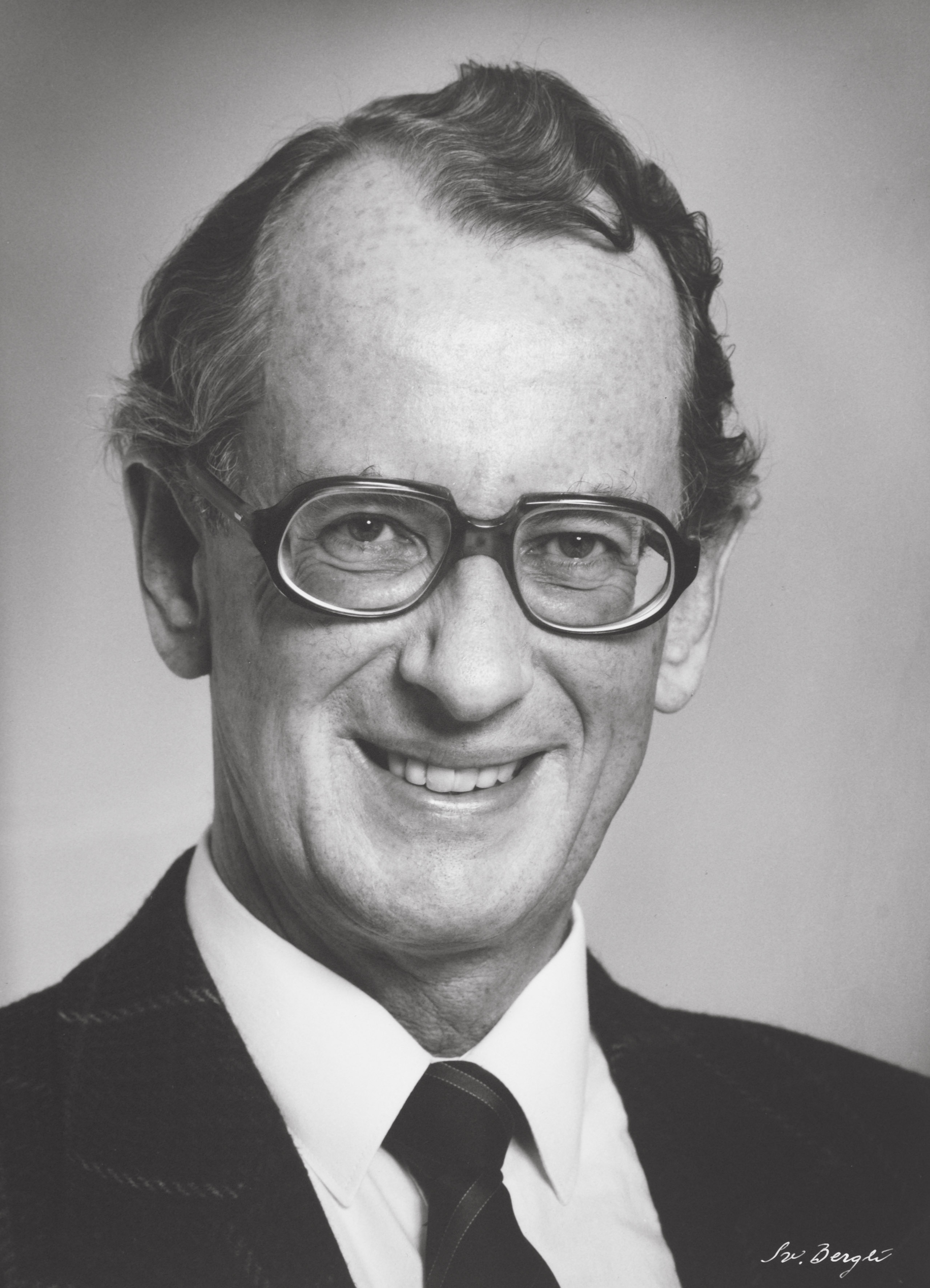
Jan P. Syse, 1989

- Marcus Jacob Monrad (1816–1897), a philosopher and academic.
- Even Tollefsen (1841–1897), a sea captain and inventor.
- Oscar Albert Johnsen (1876–1954), a historian.
- Bernhard Folkestad (1879–1933), a naturalist painter and essayist, bought a cottage on Brøtsøy.
- Anton Barth von der Lippe (1886–1960), a whaler.
- Leiv Amundsen (1898–1987), a librarian and philologist.
- Lauritz Johnson (1906–1992), a children's writer, radio and TV host, "Uncle Lauritz".
- Helge Skappel (1907–2001), an aviator, photographer and cartographer.
- Trygve Bratteli (1910–1984), a politician who served as Prime Minister of Norway from 1971 to 1972 and 1973 to 1976.
- Torgeir Andersen (1916–1991), a politician who was Mayor of Nøtterøy from 1959 to 1969.
- Aasmund Brynildsen (1917–1974), an essayist, biographer and magazine editor.
- Hanna-Marie Weydahl (1922–2016), a pianist.
- Jan P. Syse (1930–1997), a lawyer and politician who served as Prime Minister of Norway from 1989 to 1990.
- Wenche Blomberg (born 1943), an author, journalist, and criminologist who was brought up on Tjøme.
- Kjersti Holmen (born 1956), a TV and film actress.
- Tony Mills (1962–2019), an English rock singer who lived on Tjøme from 2016 until his death.
- Fredrik Kjølner (born 1970), a footballer with almost 300 club caps.
- Emma Ellingsen (born 2001), a transgender model and YouTuber.
