= Solvang, Vestfold =

Village in Færder, Norway

Solvang
- Village
- Interactive map of Solvang
- Coordinates: 59.111084°N 10.40332°E
- Country: Norway
- Region: Eastern Norway
- County: Vestfold
- Municipality: Færder Municipality
- Time zone: UTC+01:00 (CET)
  - Summer (DST): UTC+02:00 (CEST)
- Post Code: 3145 Tjøme

Solvang is a village in Færder Municipality in Vestfold county, Norway. The village is located on the island of Tjøme, about 1 kilometre (0.62 mi) to the southeast of the village of Tjøme, about 1 kilometre (0.62 mi) to the west of the village of Ormelet, about 2 kilometres (1.2 mi) to the south of the village of Hulebakk, and about 4 kilometres (2.5 mi) to the north of the village of Bjørnevåg.

The village of Solvang and the surrounding countryside had a population (in 2026) of 274. The village of Solvang is considered to be a part of the urban settlement of Tjøme, which covers the central part of the island. The 2.51-square-kilometre (620-acre) urban area has a population (2026) of 2,914 and a population density of 1,156 inhabitants per square kilometre (2,990/sq mi).
