= Fulehuk Lighthouse =

Lighthouse in Færder, Norway

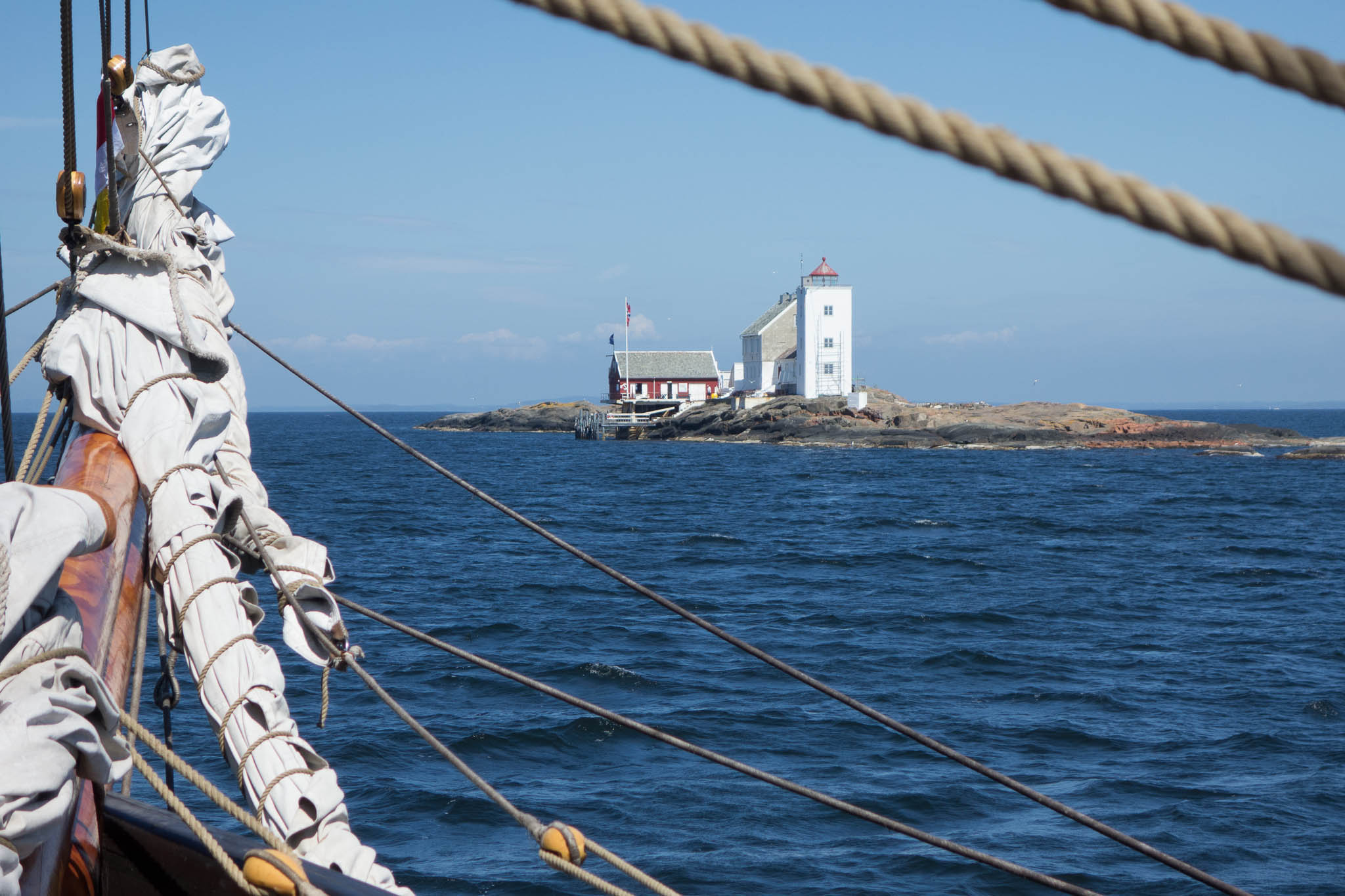
- Location: Færder Municipality; Vestfold, Norway
- Coordinates: 59°10′31″N 10°35′57″E

Tower
- Constructed: 1821 (first); 1916 (second)
- Construction: stone tower (second) metal pole
- Height: 17 metres (56 ft) (second)
- Shape: square tower with balcony and lantern (second) light pole (current)
- Markings: white tower, red lantern (second)

Light
- First lit: 1989 (current)
- Deactivated: 1989 (second)
- Focal height: 10 metres (33 ft) (current)
- Characteristic: Oc R 6s

Fulehuk Lighthouse (Norwegian: Fulehuk fyr) is a coastal lighthouse in Færder Municipality in Vestfold county, Norway. It was first lit in 1821, and replaced by a light in 1989.

== See also ==
- List of lighthouses in Norway
- Lighthouses in Norway
