= Veierland Church =

Church in Vestfold, Norway

- Veierland kirke
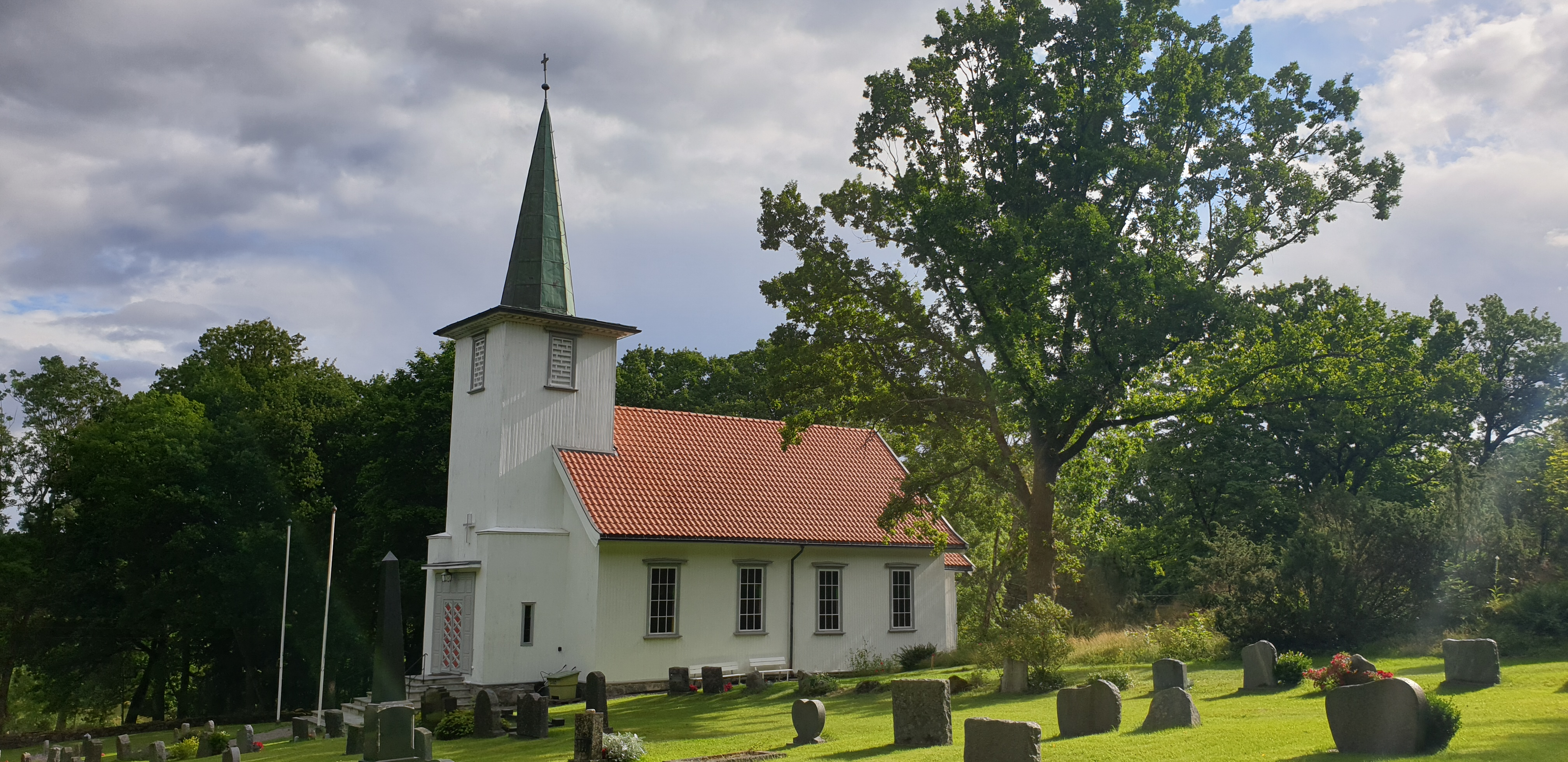
- View of the church
- Veierland Church
- 59°09′45″N 10°20′46″E
- Location: Færder Municipality, Vestfold
- Country: Norway
- Denomination: Church of Norway
- Churchmanship: Evangelical Lutheran

History
- Status: Parish church
- Founded: 1905
- Consecrated: 12 October 1905

Architecture
- Functional status: Active
- Architectural type: Long church
- Completed: 1905 (121 years ago)

Specifications
- Capacity: 150
- Materials: Wood

Administration
- Diocese: Tunsberg
- Deanery: Tønsberg domprosti
- Parish: Nøtterøy
- Norwegian Cultural Heritage Site
- Type: Church
- Status: Not protected
- ID: 85795

Veierland Church (Norwegian: Veierland kirke) is a parish church of the Church of Norway in Færder Municipality in Vestfold county, Norway. It is located in the village of Veierland (on the island of Veierland). It is one of the churches for the Nøtterøy parish which is part of the Tønsberg domprosti (deanery) in the Diocese of Tunsberg. The white, wooden church was built in a long church design in 1905 using plans drawn up by an unknown architect. The church seats about 150 people.

== History ==
The first church on Veierland was built in 1905 (it was originally called Veierland kapell, but later it was upgraded to the status of parish church). The new building was consecrated on 12 October 1905. The church has a choir inside the nave without a marked separation. A sacristy was later built on the east end of the building. For the 25th anniversary in 1930, changes were made to the west tower, the entrance, and the organ gallery. The architect for this project was Ahasverus Munthe-Kaas Vejre and the builder was Ludvig Hansen. Originally, the church was part of Stokke Municipality until 1964 when it became part of Nøtterøy Municipality. On 1 January 2018, it became part of the newly created Færder Municipality.

== Media gallery ==
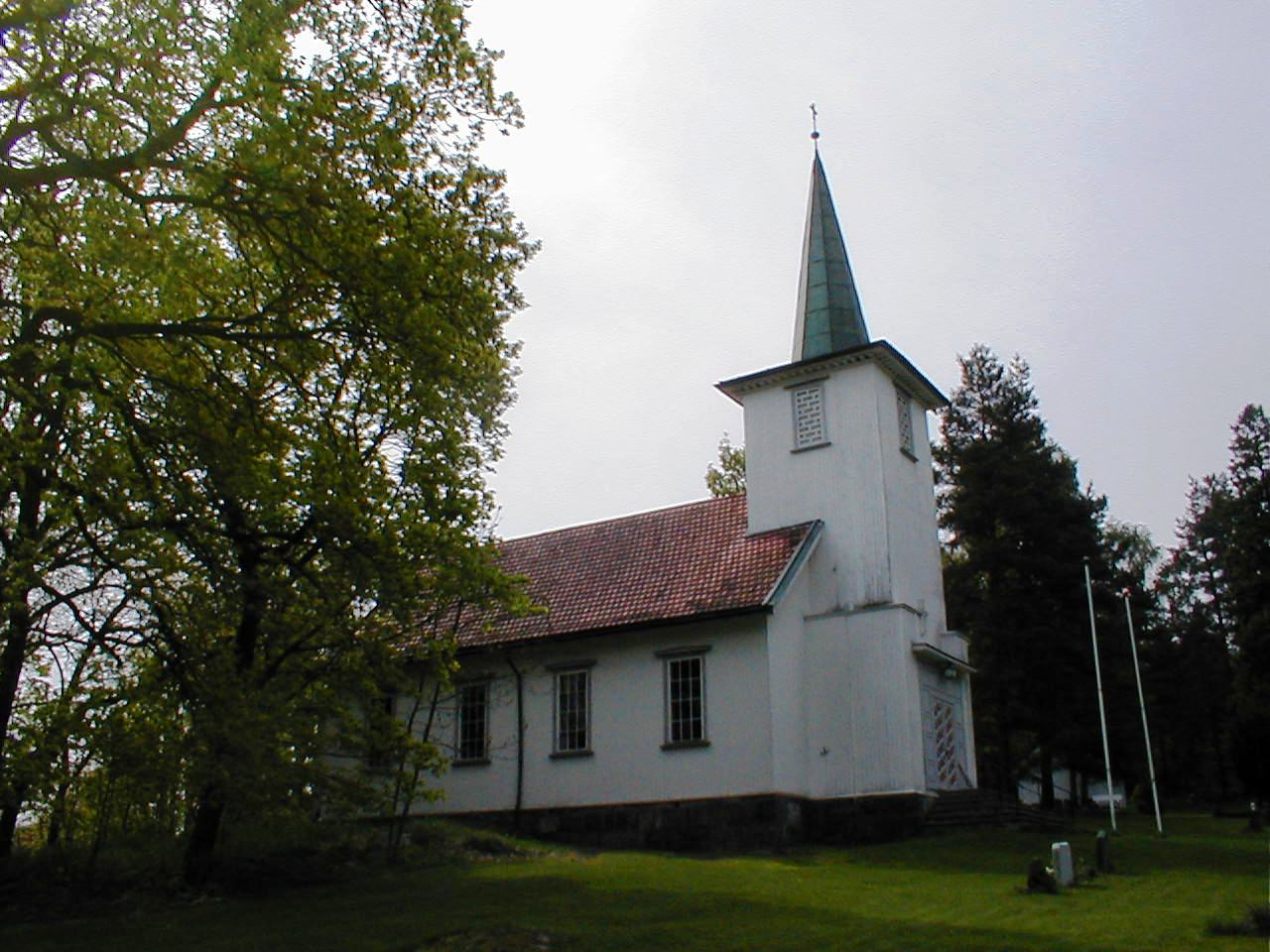

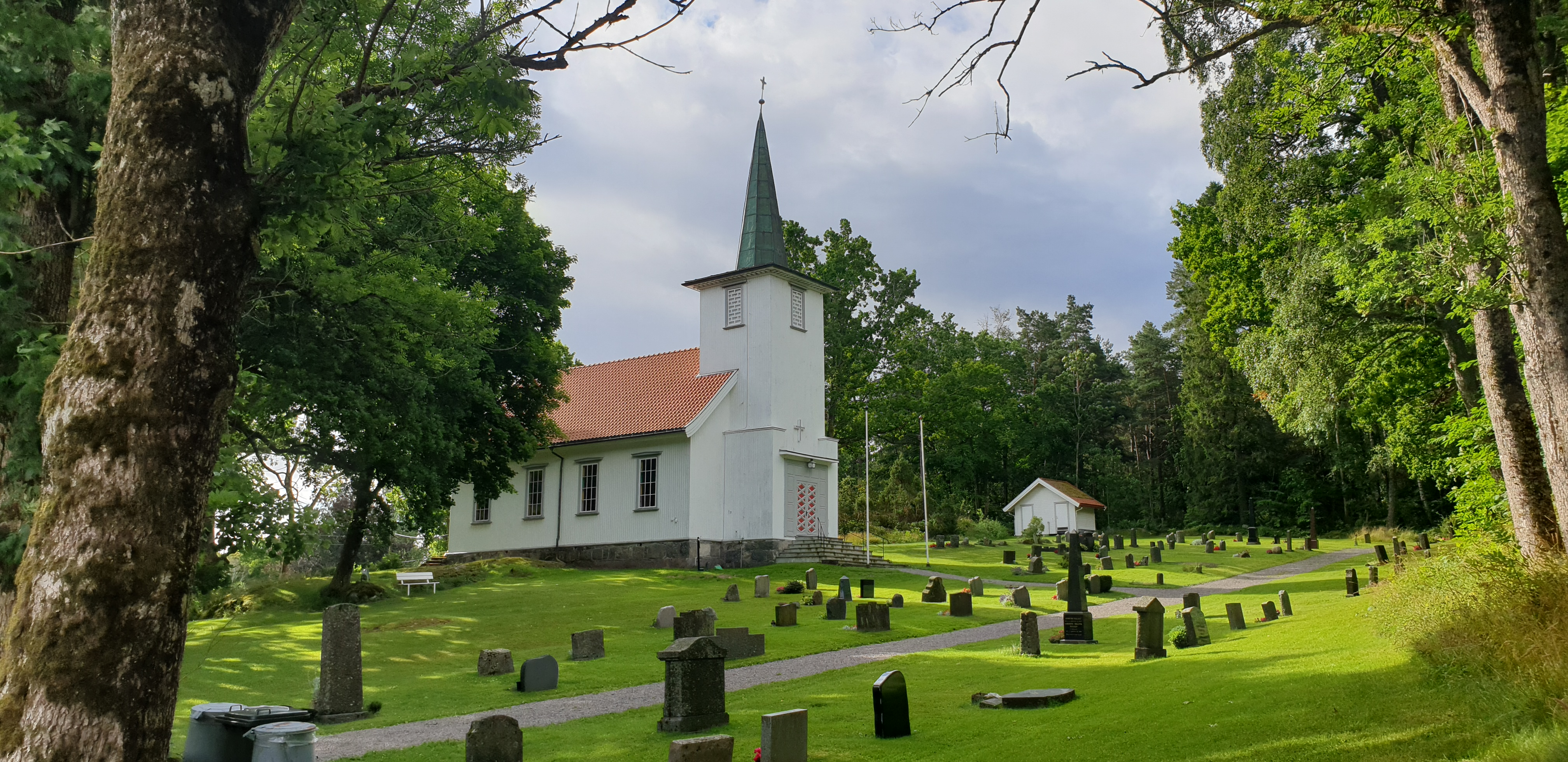

== See also ==
- List of churches in Tunsberg
