= Hanna-Marie Weydahl =

Norwegian pianist (1922–2016)

- Born: 30 June 1922; Tjøme Municipality, Norway
- Died: 5 January 2016 (aged 93); Oslo
- Occupation: Pianist

Hanna-Marie Weydahl (30 June 1922 – 5 January 2016) was a Norwegian pianist.

She was born in Tjøme Municipality, and made her concert debut in Oslo in 1940. Among her repertoire was music by Fartein Valen, Harald Sæverud, Klaus Egge, Eivind Groven, Geirr Tveitt, and Alexander Scriabin. She lectured at the Norwegian Academy of Music from 1973 to 1991. She was awarded the Harriet Cohen International Music Award in 1966, and the King's Medal of Merit in gold in 1986.
