= Tjøme Church =

Church in Vestfold, Norway

- Tjøme kirke
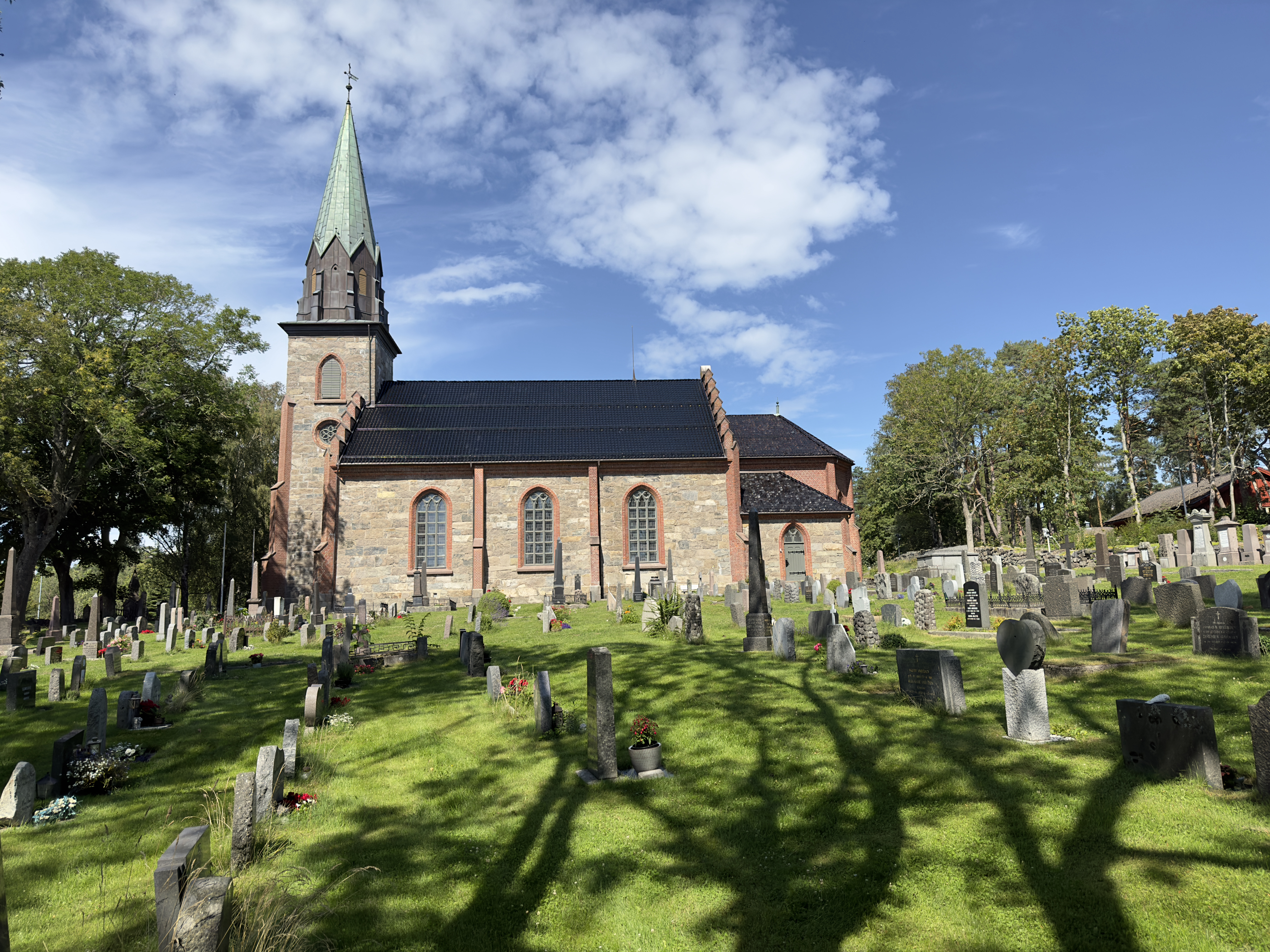
- View of the church
- Tjøme Church
- 59°06′49″N 10°23′30″E
- Location: Færder Municipality, Vestfold
- Country: Norway
- Denomination: Church of Norway
- Previous denomination: Catholic Church
- Churchmanship: Evangelical Lutheran

History
- Status: Parish church
- Founded: 13th century
- Consecrated: 12 Sept 1867

Architecture
- Functional status: Active
- Architect: Anders Thorød
- Architectural type: Long church
- Completed: 1867 (159 years ago)

Specifications
- Capacity: 320
- Materials: Stone and brick

Administration
- Diocese: Tunsberg
- Deanery: Tønsberg domprosti
- Parish: Tjøme
- Norwegian Cultural Heritage Site
- Type: Church
- Status: Listed
- ID: 85638

Tjøme Church (Norwegian: Tjøme kirke) is a parish church of the Church of Norway in Færder Municipality in Vestfold county, Norway. It is located in the village of Tjøme. It is the church for the Tjøme parish which is part of the Tønsberg domprosti (deanery) in the Diocese of Tunsberg. The stone and brick church was built in a long church design in 1867 using plans drawn up by the architect Anders Thorød. The church seats about 320 people.

== History ==
The earliest existing historical records of the church date back to the year 1398, but the church was not built that year. The church may have been built in the 13th century. It was a stone church that was dedicated to Saint Olaf. The Romanesque stone church had a rectangular nave and a smaller, narrower, rectangular choir with an internal apse at the east end of the choir.

By the mid-19th century, the church had become too small for the parish and plans for a new church on the same site were made. In 1865, the old church was torn down and construction began on the new church. Some stone from the old church was re-used in the construction of the new church. The new building was designed by Anders Thorød. It had a large rectangular nave with a smaller choir to the east and a church porch and tower on the west end. The choir was flanked by vestries. The exterior of the church was built of larvikite and brick. It was consecrated by the bishop on 12 September 1867. Inside, there is a second-floor seating gallery on the west end and along the north wall of the nave. Much of the interior furnishings were transferred from the old church building into this one. The church was extensively restored in 1949–1950, again in 1991, and again in 2004–2006.

== Inventory ==
A carved baroque altarpiece and a pulpit with figures of the evangelists were both created in the period from 1670–1676. The stained-glass windows were made in Glasgow and were consecrated in 1901. There are four church bells in the tower; two from Amsterdam dating to 1707 and 1712 and two were cast in 1937 at Olsen Nauen Bell Foundry in Tønsberg. The cemetery outside the church is the site of the grave of author Alf Larsen (1885-1967).

== Media gallery ==
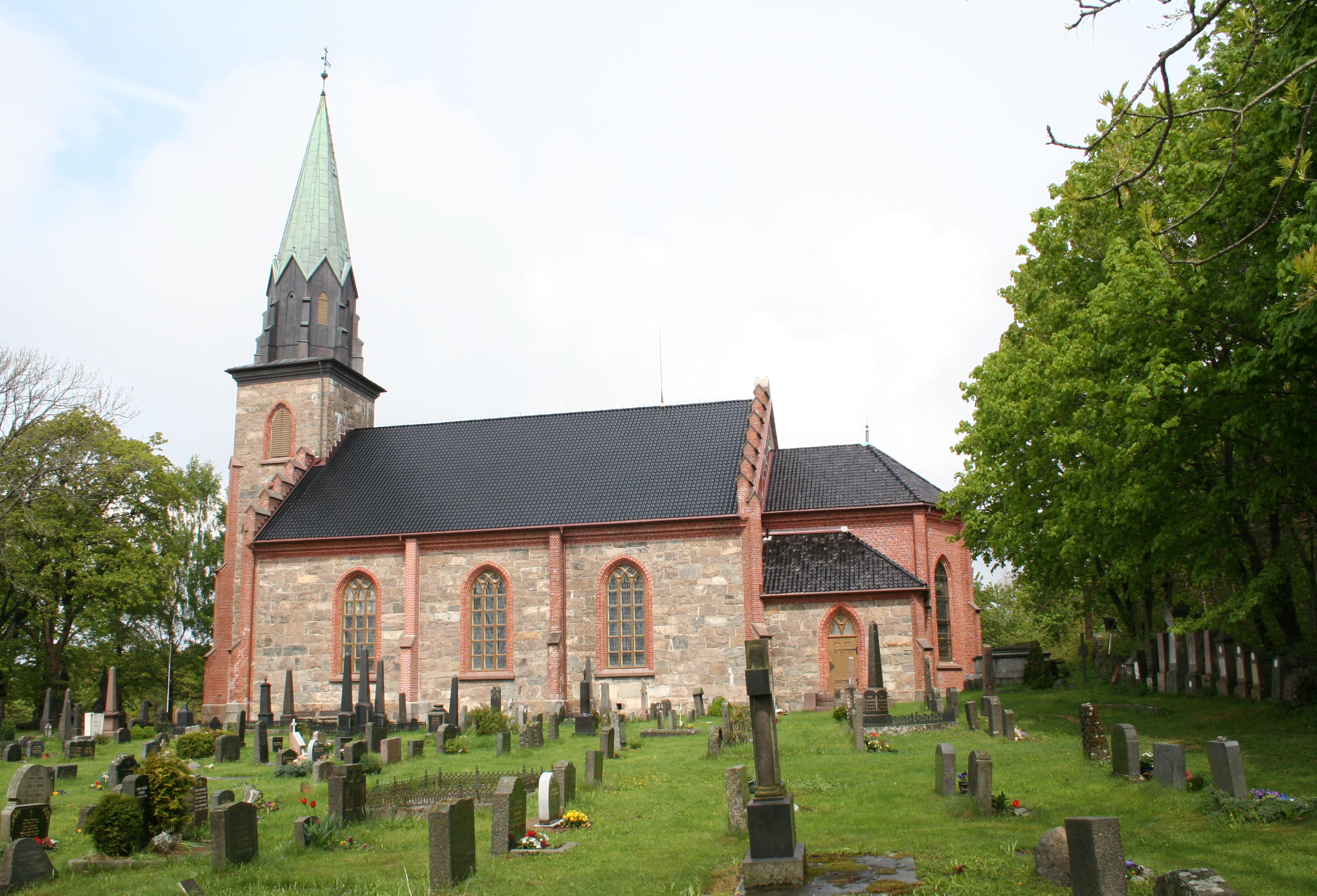

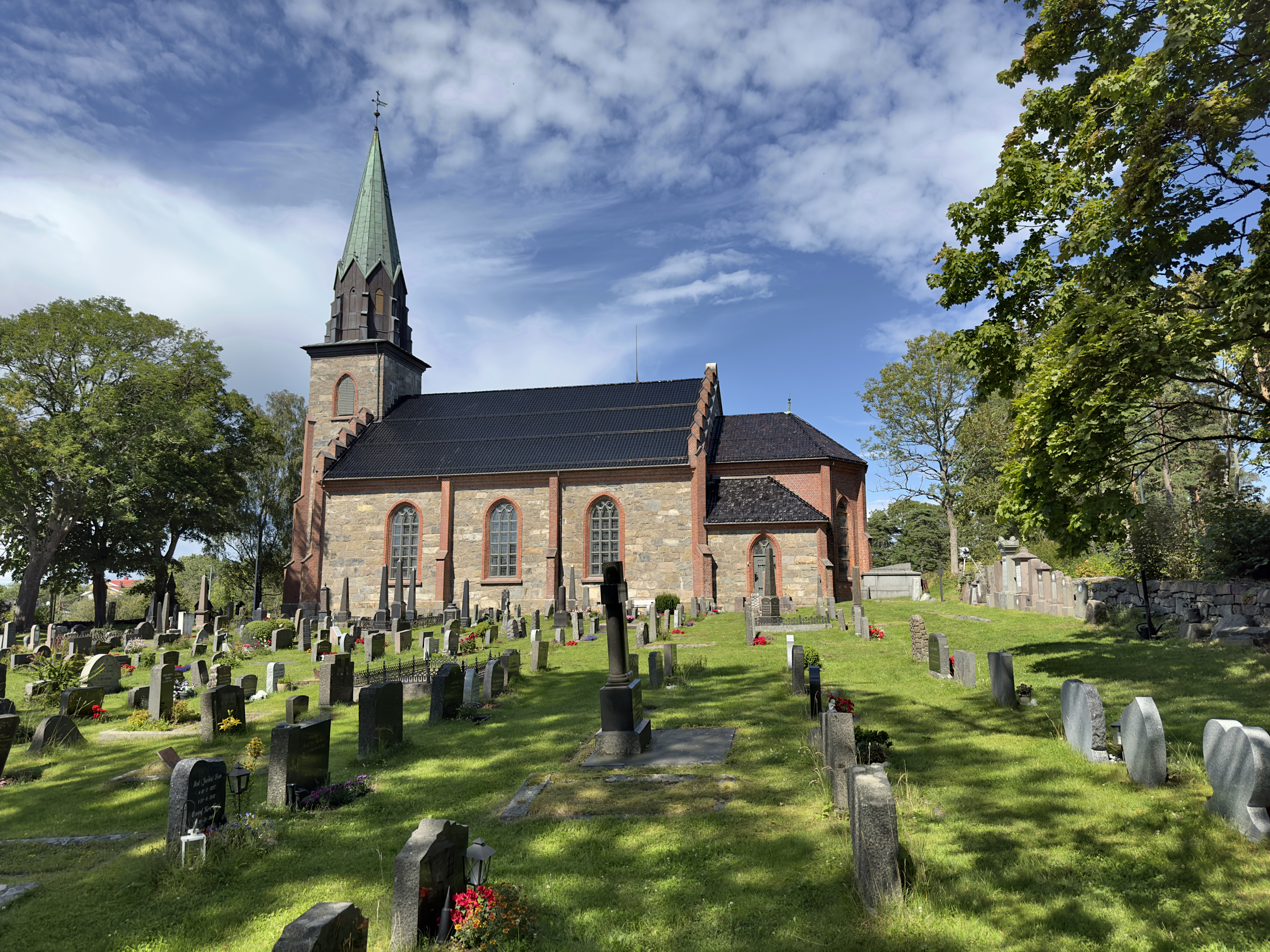

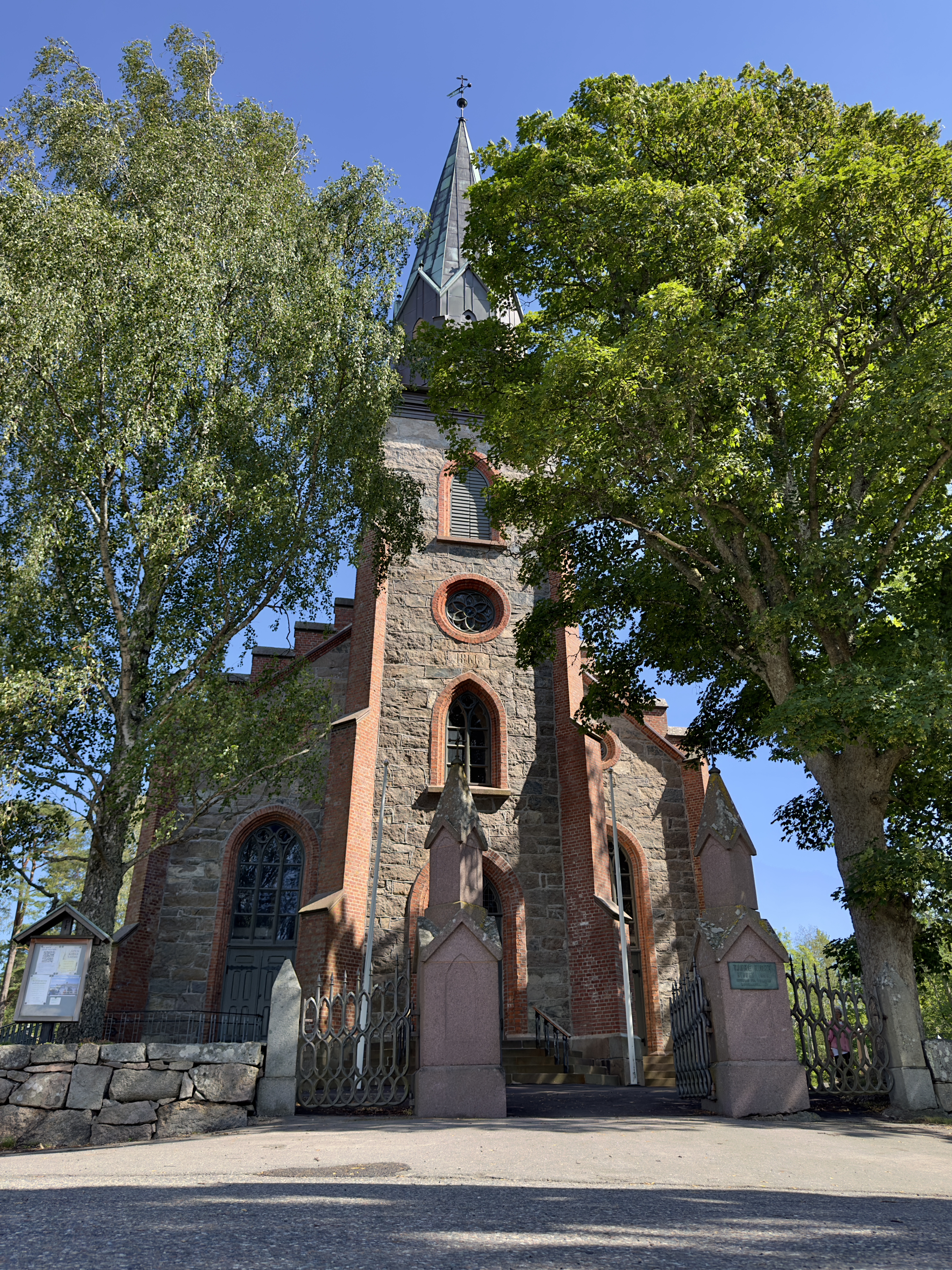

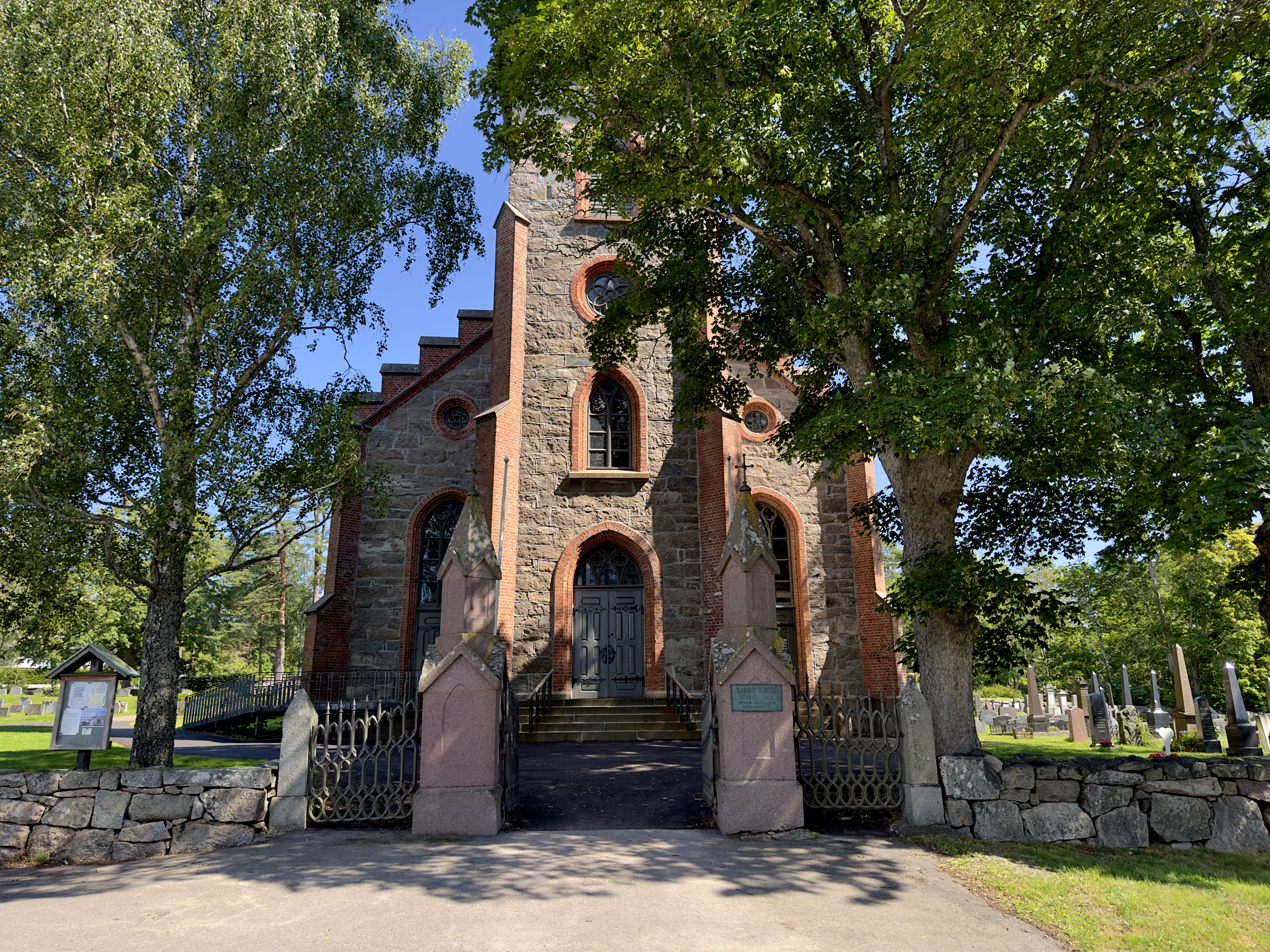

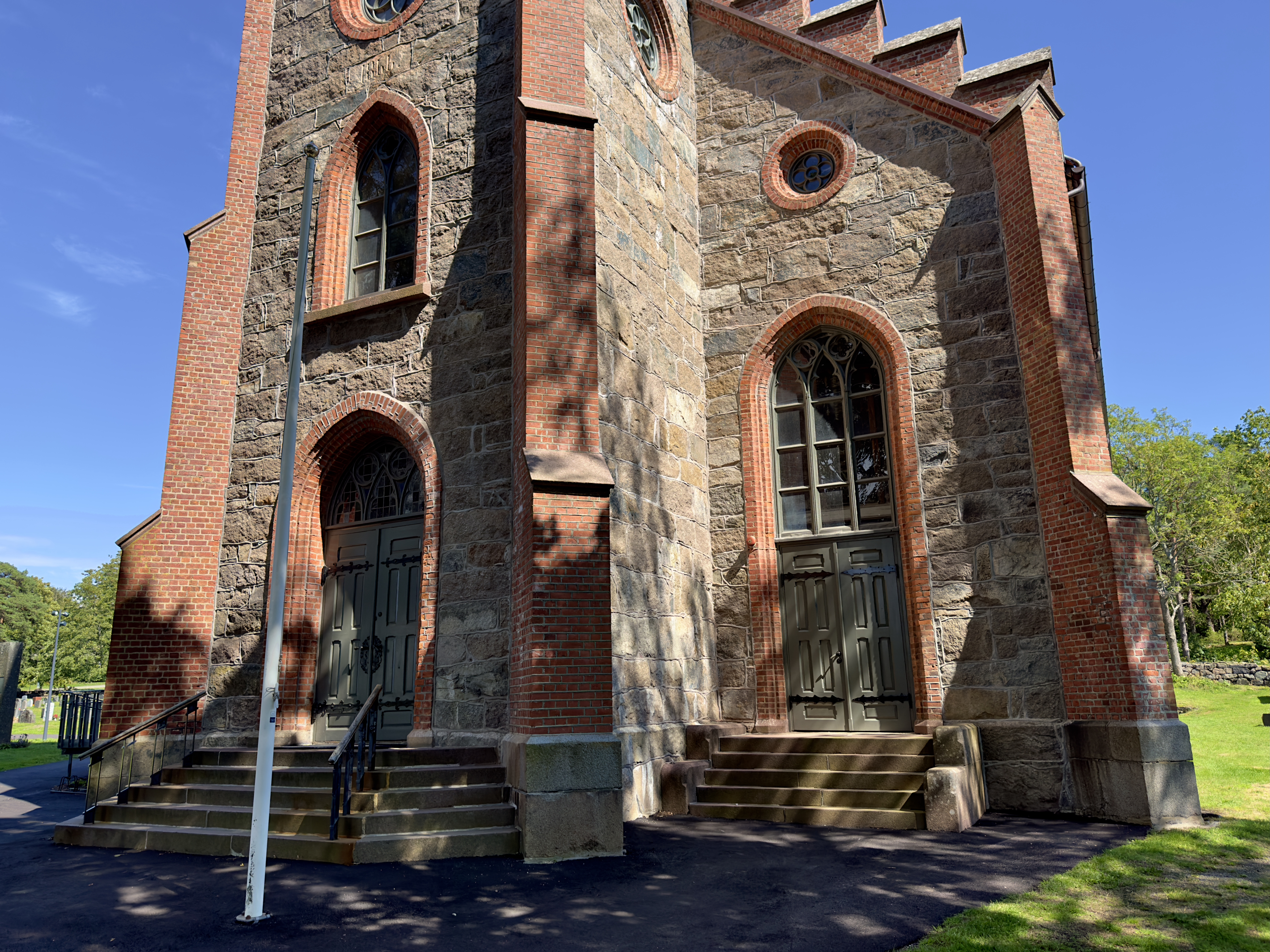

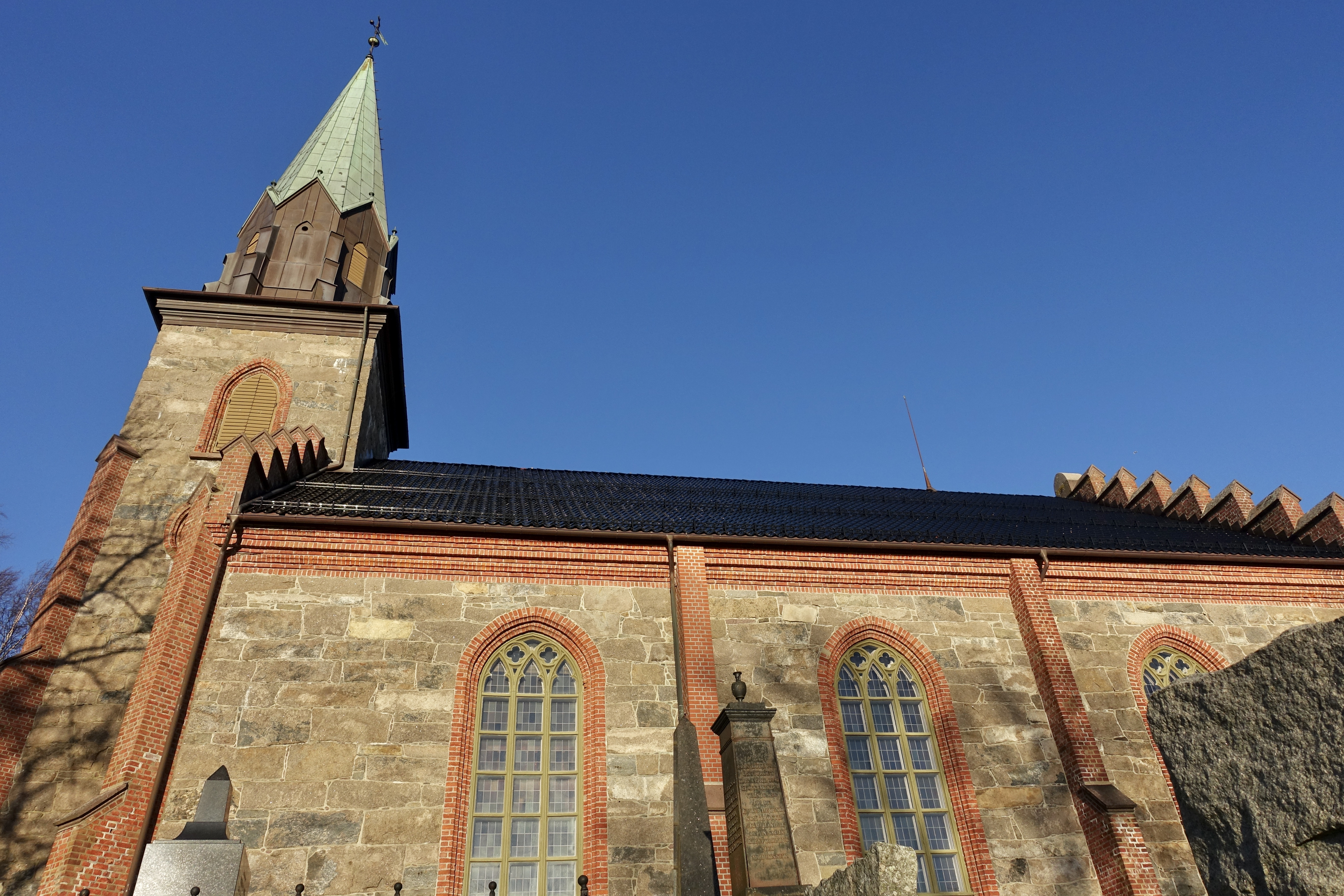

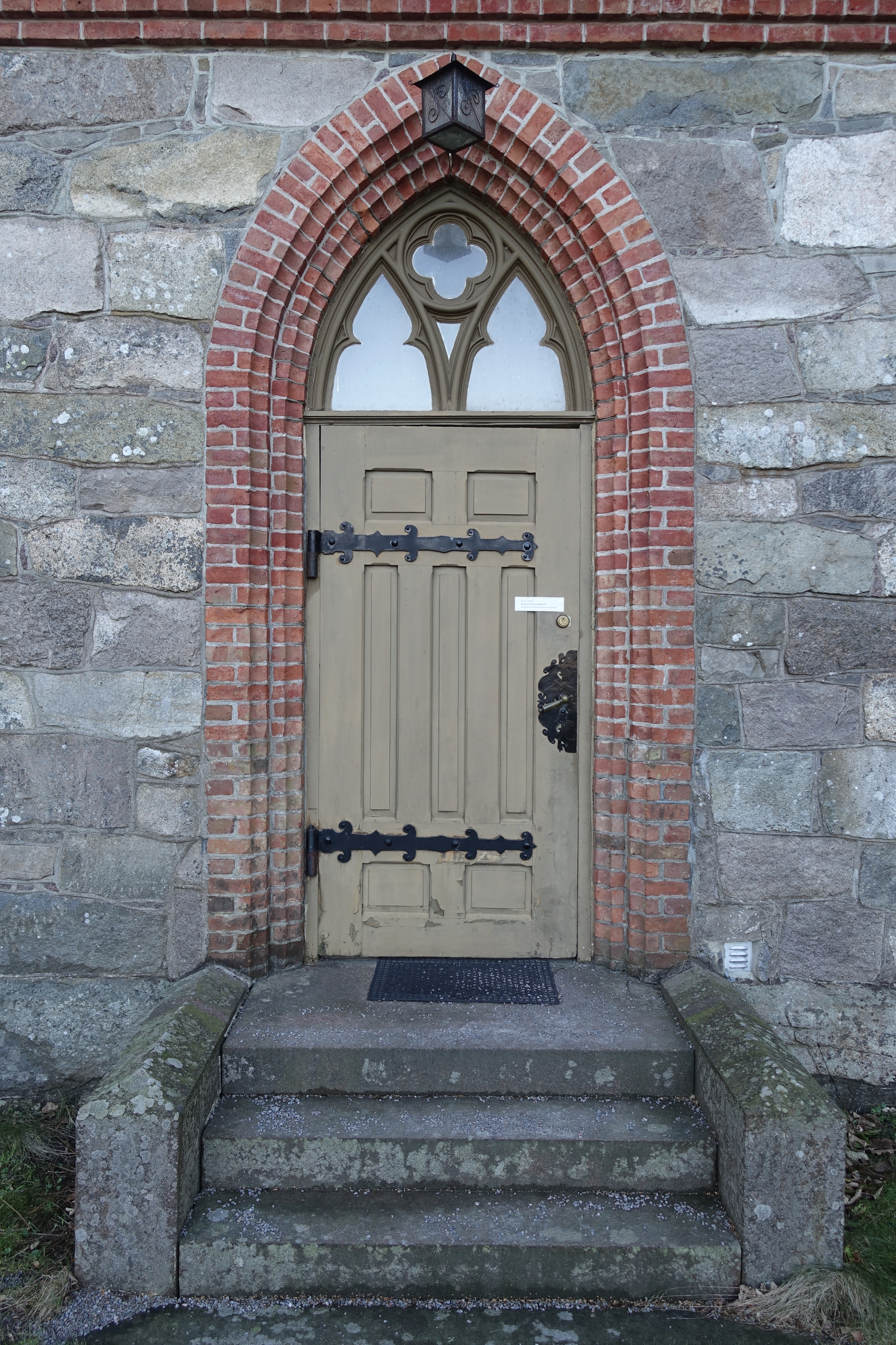

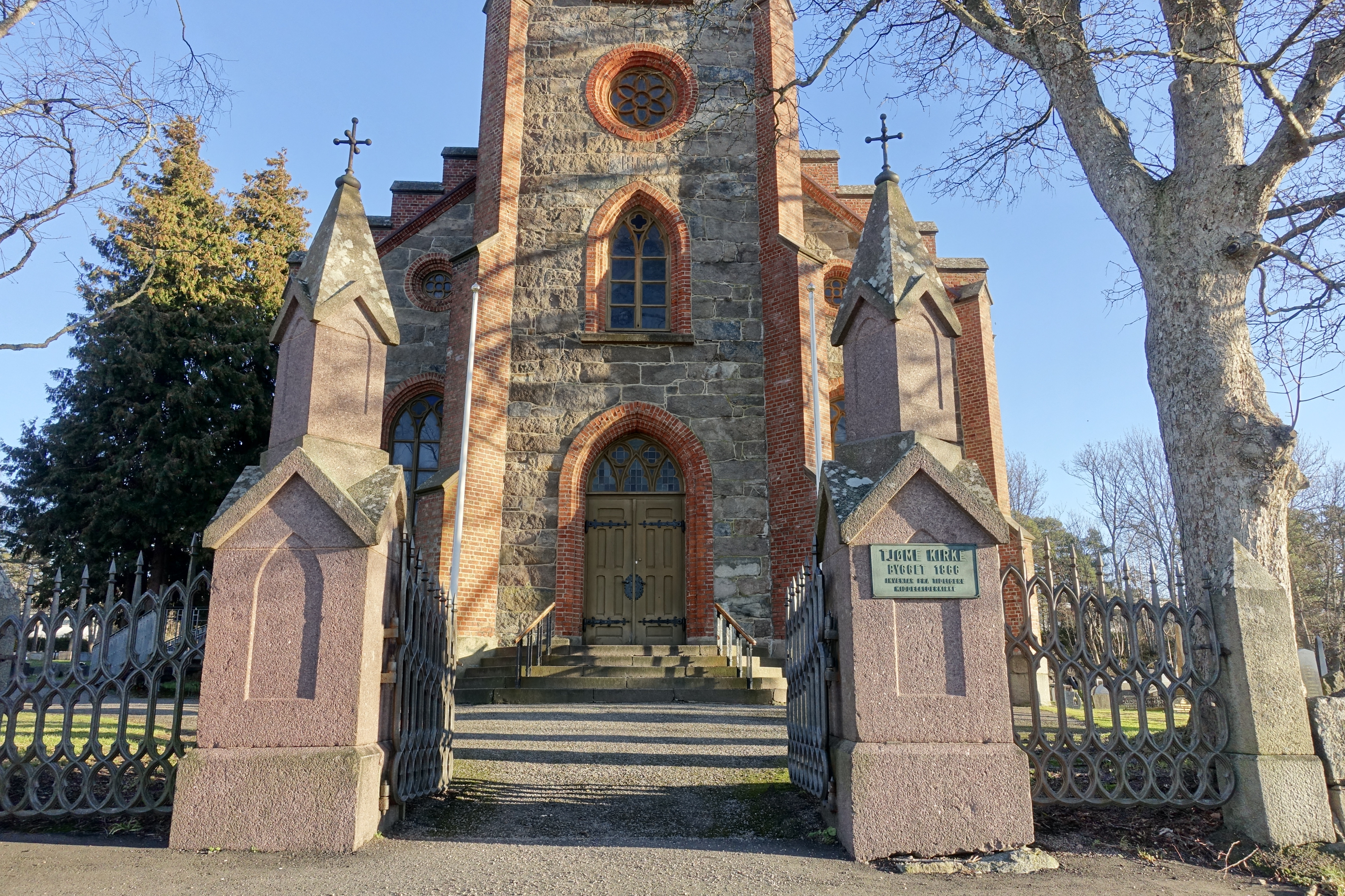

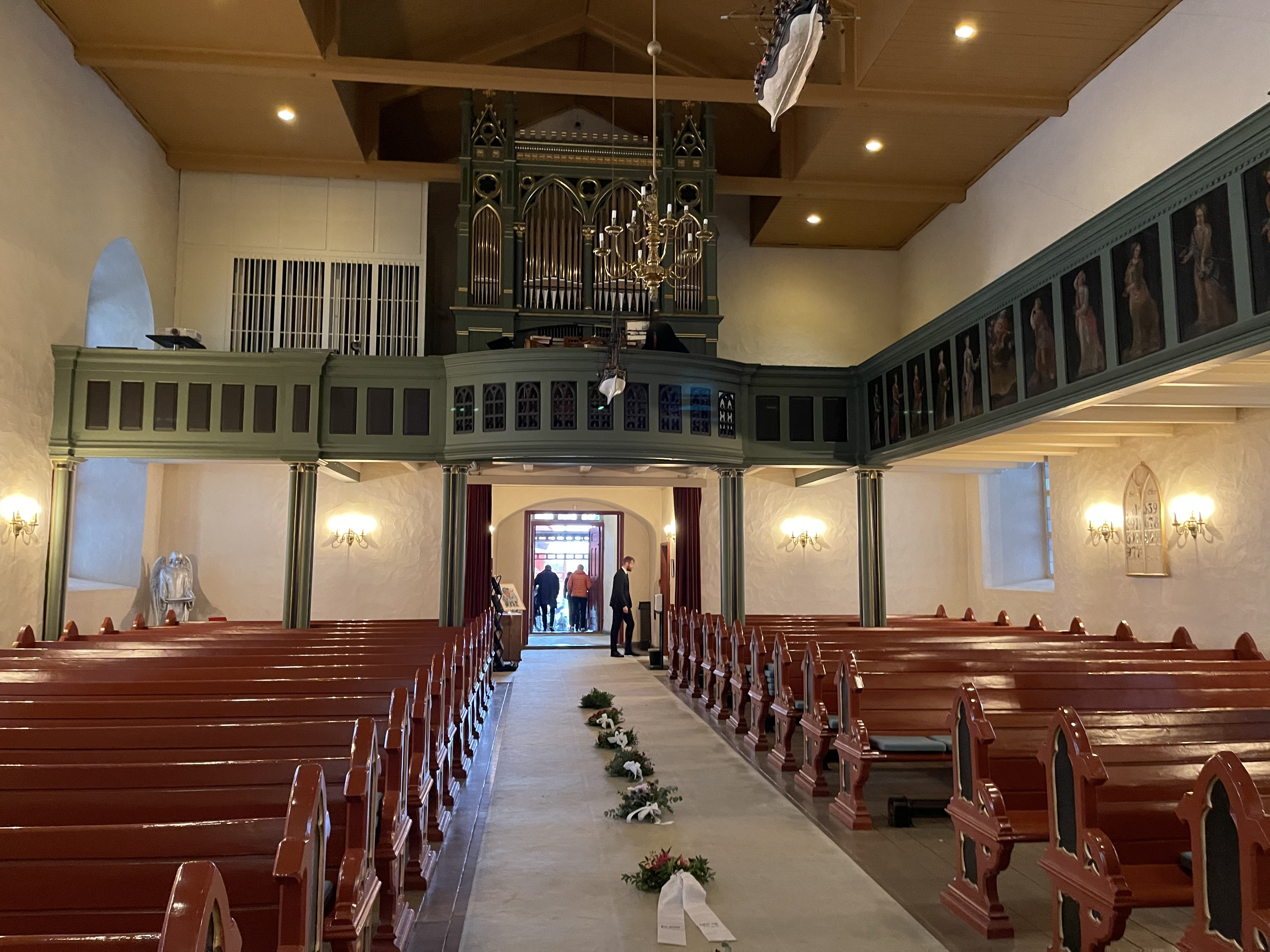

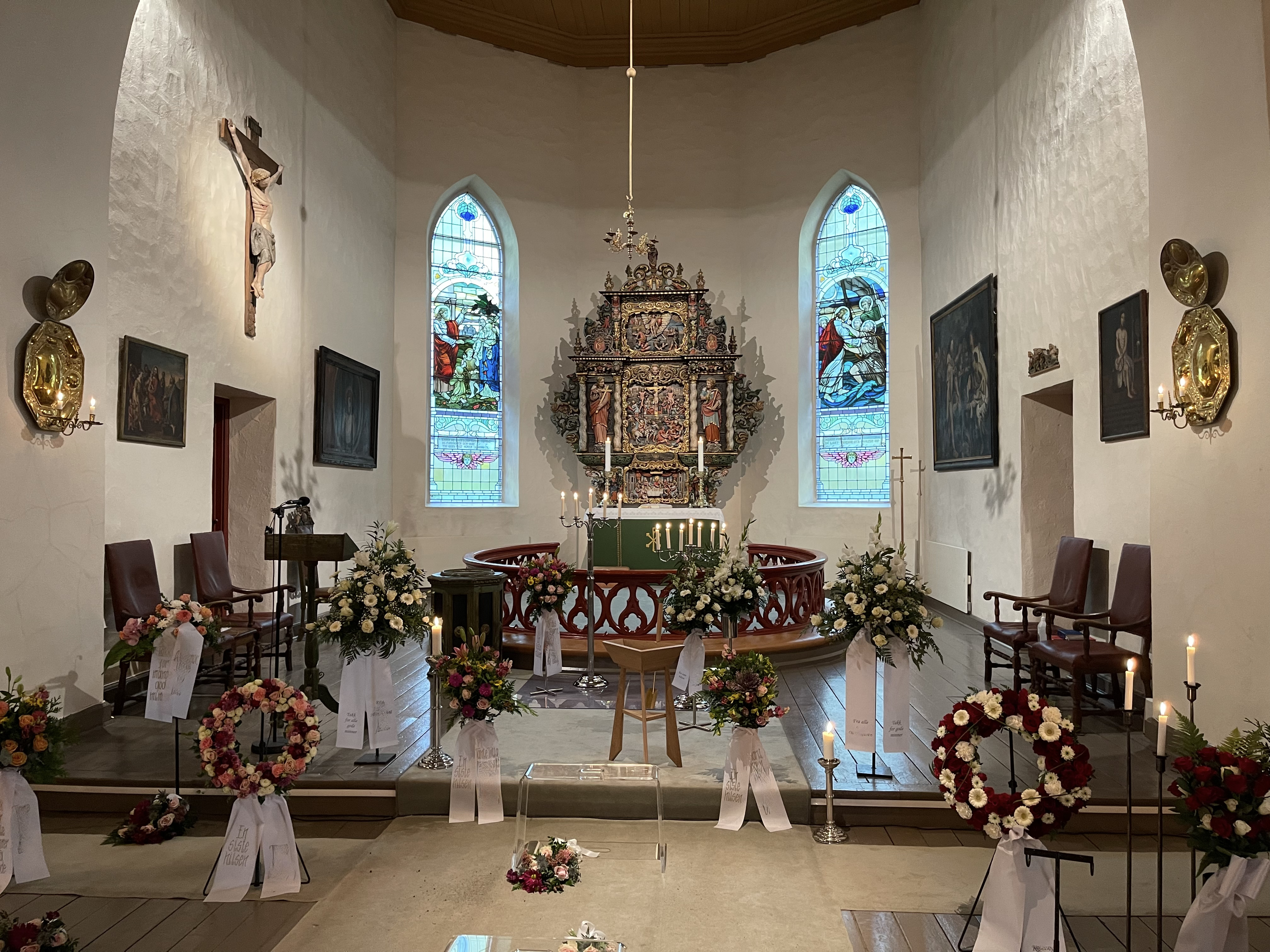

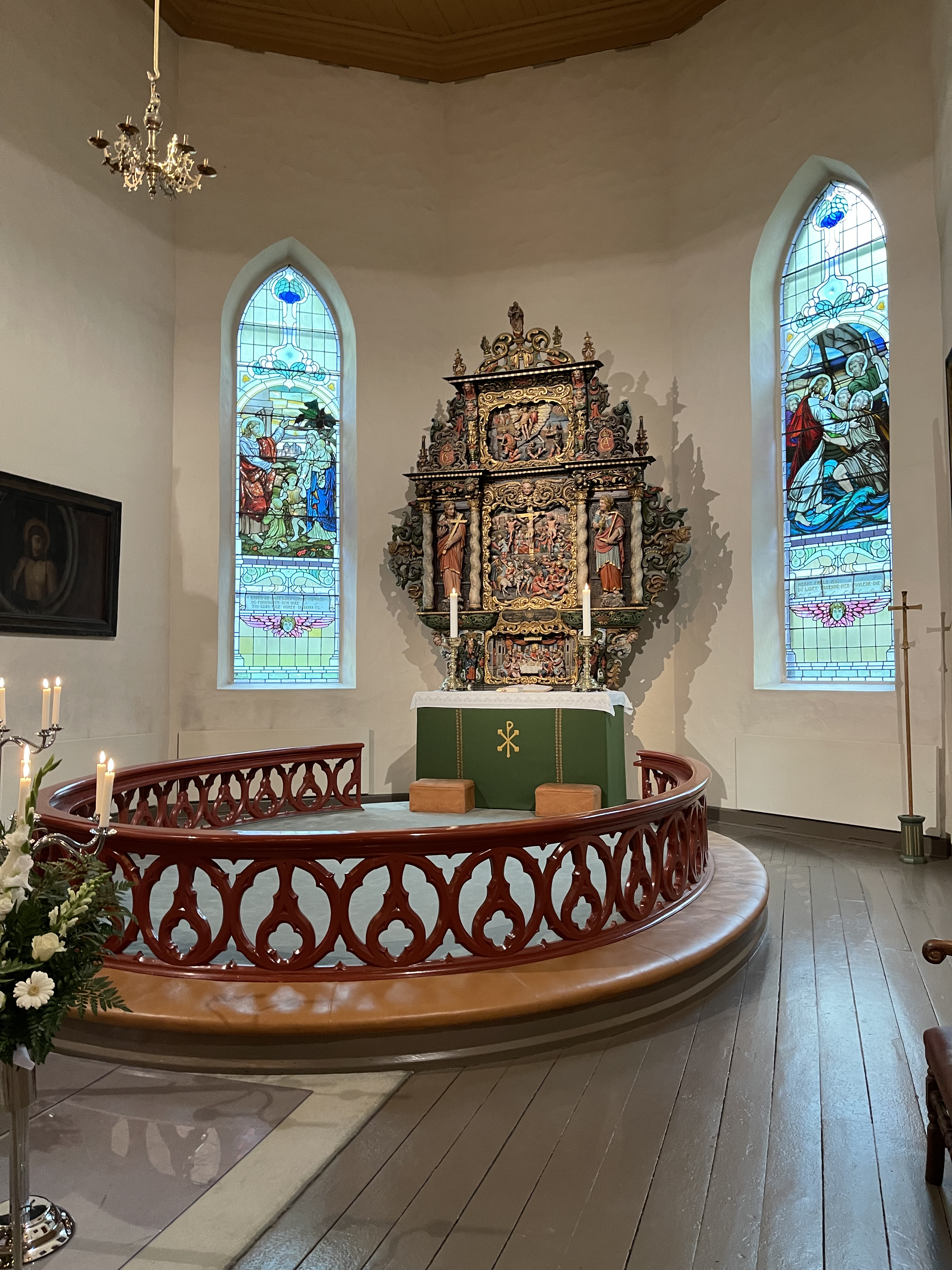

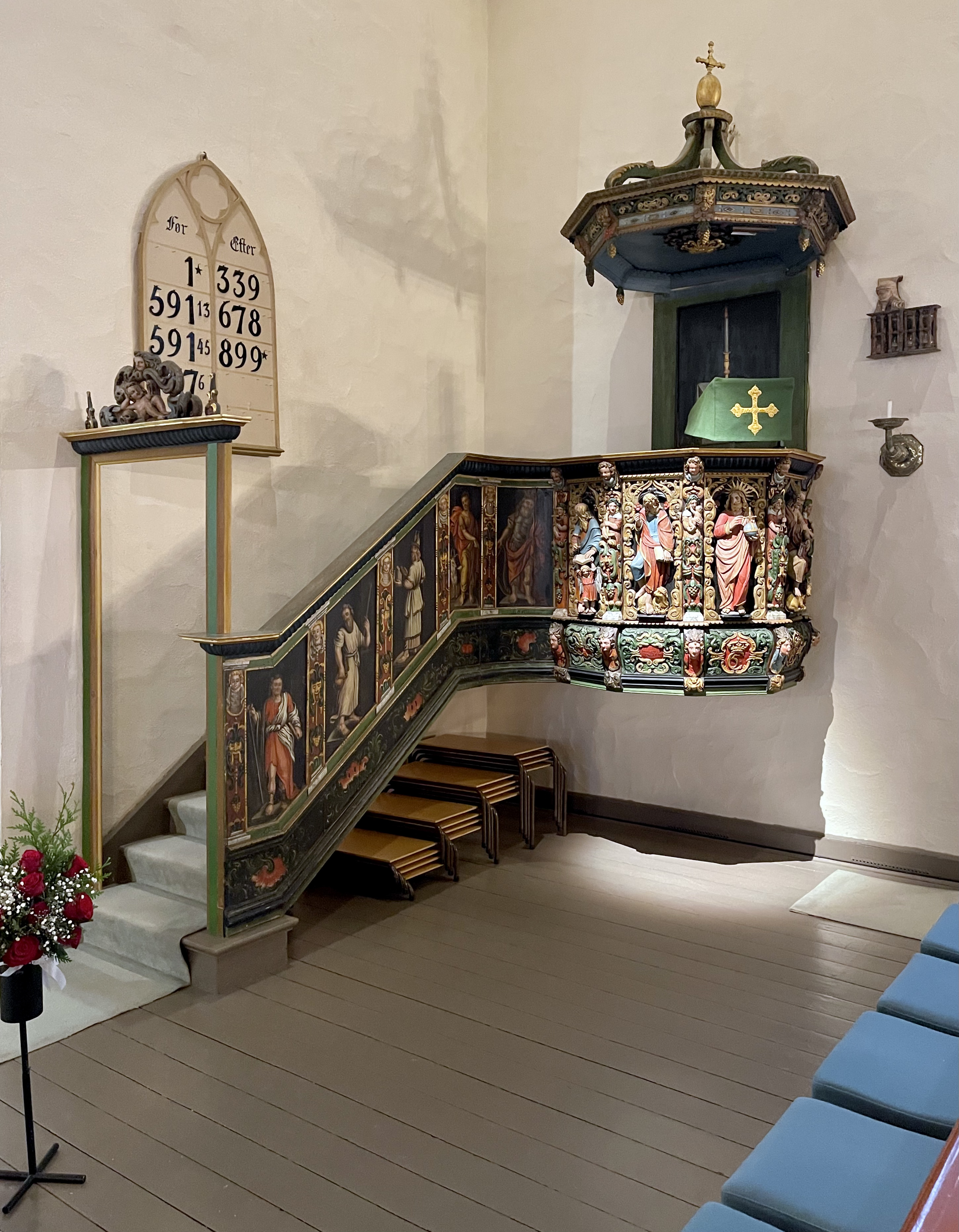

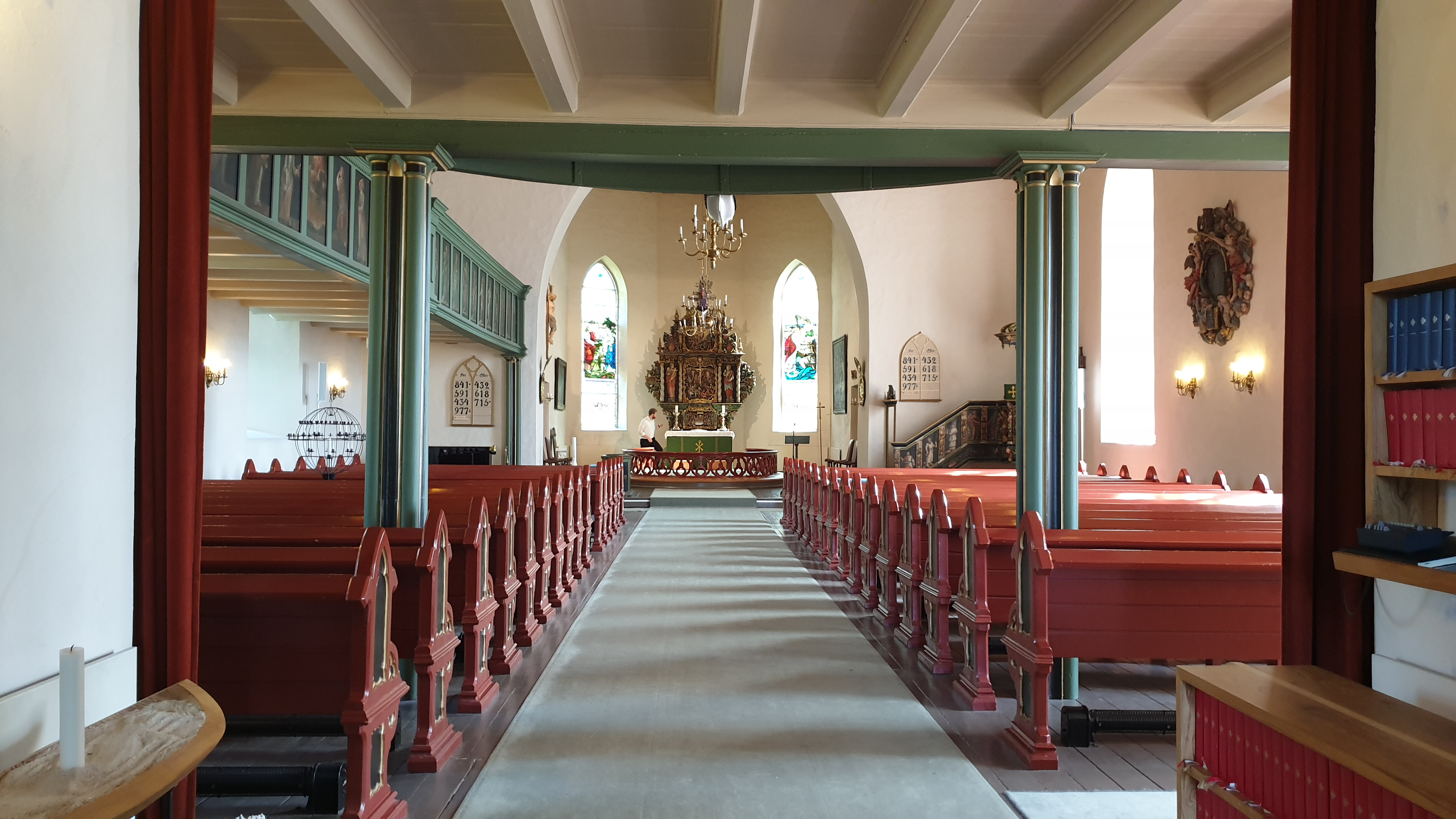

== See also ==
- List of churches in Tunsberg
