= Ormelet =

Village in Færder Municipality, Norway

- Village
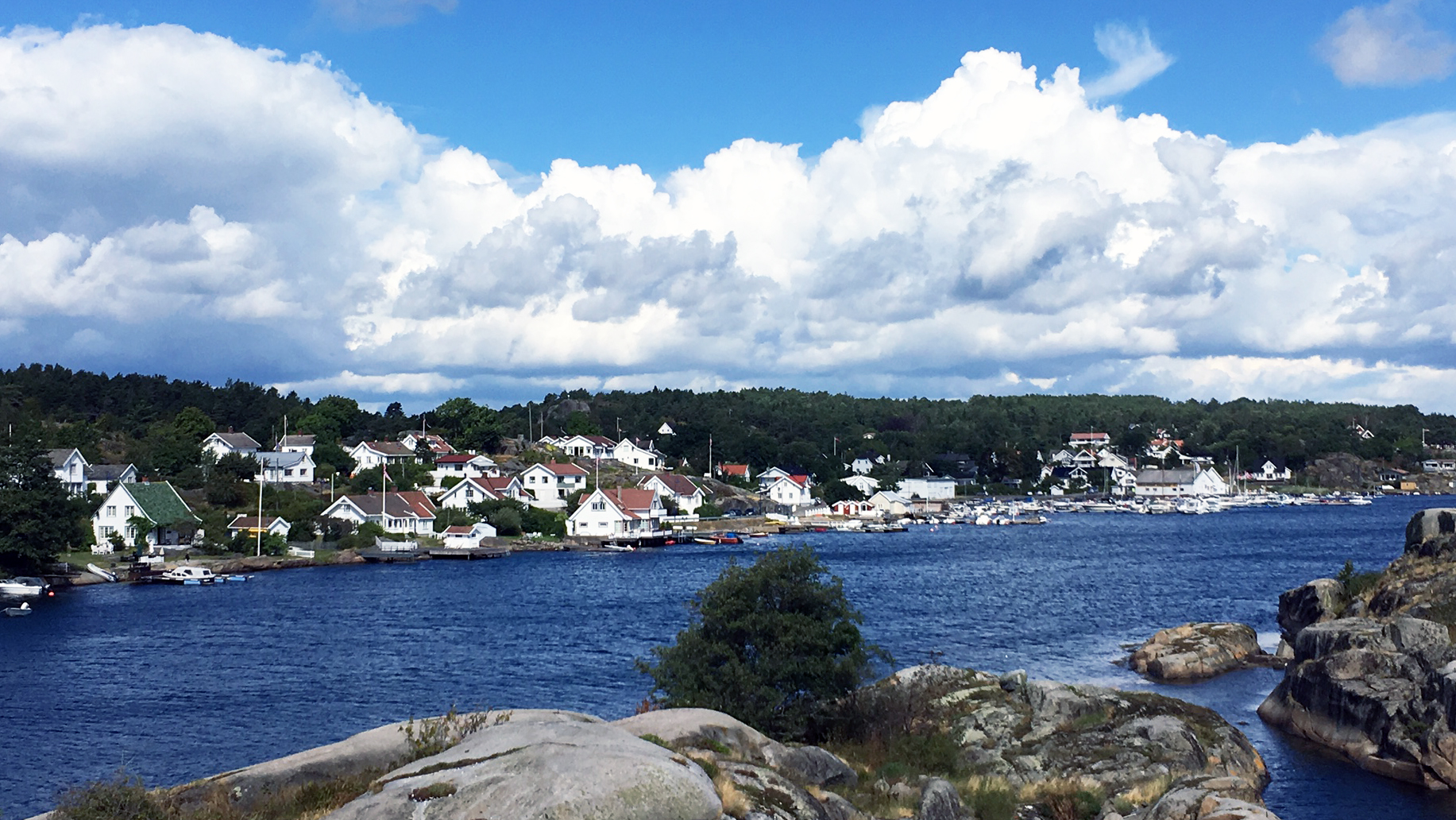
- View of the village seen from the Røssesund bridge
- Interactive map of Ormelet
- Coordinates: 59.10847°N 10.41676°E
- Country: Norway
- Region: Eastern Norway
- County: Vestfold
- Municipality: Færder Municipality
- Elevation: 4 m (13 ft)
- Time zone: UTC+01:00 (CET)
  - Summer (DST): UTC+02:00 (CEST)
- Post Code: 3145 Tjøme

Ormelet is a village in Færder Municipality in Vestfold county, Norway. The village is located on the island of Tjøme, immediately southeast of the village of Solvang, about 2 kilometres (1.2 mi) to the southeast of the village of Tjøme, about 2 kilometres (1.2 mi) to the south of the village of Hulebak, and about 4 kilometres (2.5 mi) to the north of the village of Bjørnevåg. The Røssesund Bridge is just south of the village, connecting the island of Tjøme to the islands of Brøtsø and Hvasser.

The village of Ormelet and the surrounding countryside had a population (in 2026) of 378. The village of Ormelet is considered to be a part of the urban settlement of Tjøme, which covers the central part of the island. The 2.51-square-kilometre (620-acre) urban area has a population (2026) of 2,914 and a population density of 1,152 inhabitants per square kilometre (2,980/sq mi).
