= Bjørnevåg =

Village in Færder Municipality, Norway

- Village
- Interactive map of Bjørnevåg
- Coordinates: 59.07531°N 10.40603°E
- Country: Norway
- Region: Eastern Norway
- County: Vestfold
- Municipality: Færder Municipality
- Elevation: 14 m (46 ft)
- Time zone: UTC+01:00 (CET)
  - Summer (DST): UTC+02:00 (CEST)
- Post Code: 3145 Tjøme

Bjørnevåg is a village in Færder Municipality in Vestfold county, Norway. It is located on the southern part of the island of Tjøme, about 4.5 kilometres (2.8 mi) south of the villages of Tjøme, Solvang, and Ormelet. Verdens Ende, the southern tip of the island, lies about 2 kilometres (1.2 mi) to the south of Bjørnevåg.

The village of Bjørnevåg and the surrounding countryside had a population of 347 people in 2026.
