= Grimestad =

Village in Færder Municipality, Norway

- Village
- Interactive map of Grimestad
- Coordinates: 59.13588°N 10.40479°E
- Country: Norway
- Region: Eastern Norway
- County: Vestfold
- Municipality: Færder Municipality
- Elevation: 26 m (85 ft)
- Time zone: UTC+01:00 (CET)
  - Summer (DST): UTC+02:00 (CEST)
- Post Code: 3145 Tjøme

Grimestad is a village in Færder Municipality in Vestfold county, Norway. The village is located on the island of Tjøme, about 3 kilometres (1.9 mi) to the northeast of the village of Tjøme, about 1 kilometre (0.62 mi) to the north of the village of Hulebakk, about 4 kilometres (2.5 mi) to the southeast of the village of Sundene, and about 1.5 kilometres (0.93 mi) east of the village of Svelvik.

The village of Grimestad and the surrounding countryside had a population (in 2007) of 344 people. The village of Grimestad is considered to be a part of the urban settlement of Tjøme, which covers the central part of the island. The 2.52-square-kilometre (620-acre) urban area has a population (2026) of 2,914 and a population density of 1,152 inhabitants per square kilometre (2,980/sq mi).
