= Svelvik, Tjøme =

Village in Færder, Norway

Svelvik
- Village
- Interactive map of Svelvik
- Coordinates: 59.13591°N 10.38318°E
- Country: Norway
- Region: Eastern Norway
- County: Vestfold
- Municipality: Færder Municipality
- Elevation: 8 m (26 ft)
- Time zone: UTC+01:00 (CET)
  - Summer (DST): UTC+02:00 (CEST)
- Post Code: 3145 Tjøme

Svelvik is a village in Færder Municipality in Vestfold county, Norway. The village is located on the island of Tjøme, about 3 kilometres (1.9 mi) to the north of the village of Tjøme, about 4 kilometres (2.5 mi) to the south of the village of Sundene, and about 1 kilometre (0.62 mi) to the west of the village of Grimestad.

The village of Svelvik and the surrounding countryside had a population (in 2026) of 577.
