= Tjøme (village) =

Village in Færder, Norway

Tjøme Kirkebygda
- Village
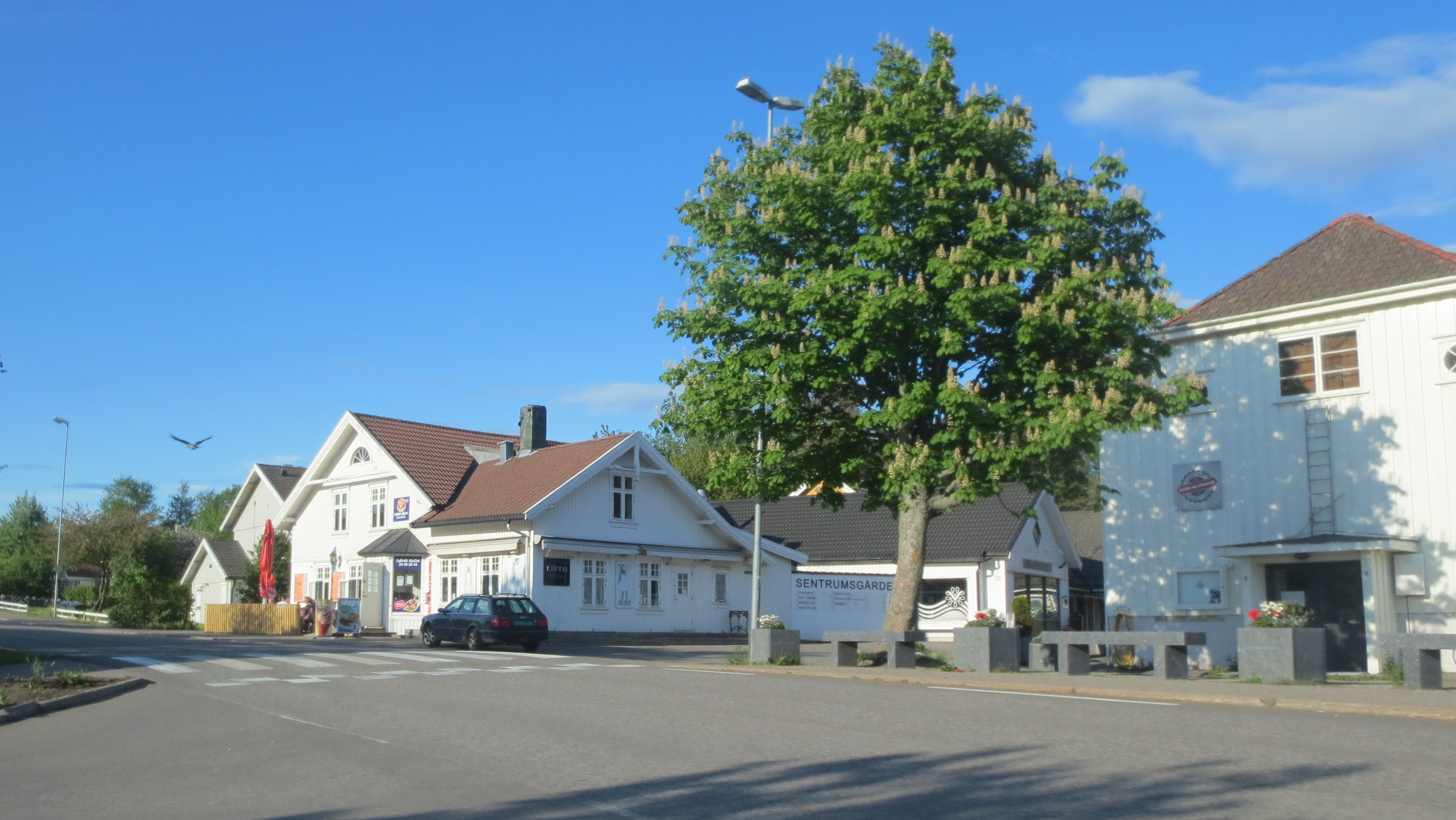
- View of the village centre
- Interactive map of Tjøme
- Coordinates: 59.11567°N 10.39281°E
- Country: Norway
- Region: Eastern Norway
- County: Vestfold
- Municipality: Færder Municipality

Area
  - Total: 2.52 km^{2} (0.97 sq mi)
- Elevation: 30 m (98 ft)

Population (2026)
  - Total: 2,914
  - Density: 1,156/km^{2} (2,990/sq mi)
- Time zone: UTC+01:00 (CET)
  - Summer (DST): UTC+02:00 (CEST)
- Post Code: 3145 Tjøme

Tjøme or Kirkebygda is a village in Færder Municipality in Vestfold county, Norway. The village is located in the central part of the island of Tjøme, about 20 kilometres (12 mi) south of the city of Tønsberg. The village of Bjørnevåg lies about 5 kilometres (3.1 mi) to the south, the village of Ormelet lies about 2 kilometres (1.2 mi) to the southeast, the village of Hulebakk lies about 1.5 kilometres (0.93 mi) to the east-northeast, the village of Grimestad lies about 2.5 kilometres (1.6 mi) to the north-northeast, and the village of Svelvik lies about 2.5 kilometres (1.6 mi) to the north.

The 2.52-square-kilometre (620-acre) village has a population (2026) of 2,914 and a population density of 1,156 inhabitants per square kilometre (2,990/sq mi).

Tjøme Church is located in the village centre. The village also has a library, grocery stores, gas station, schools, and other businesses. The village was the administrative centre of the old Tjøme Municipality which existed from 1838 until 2018 when it became part of Færder Municipality.

== Media gallery ==
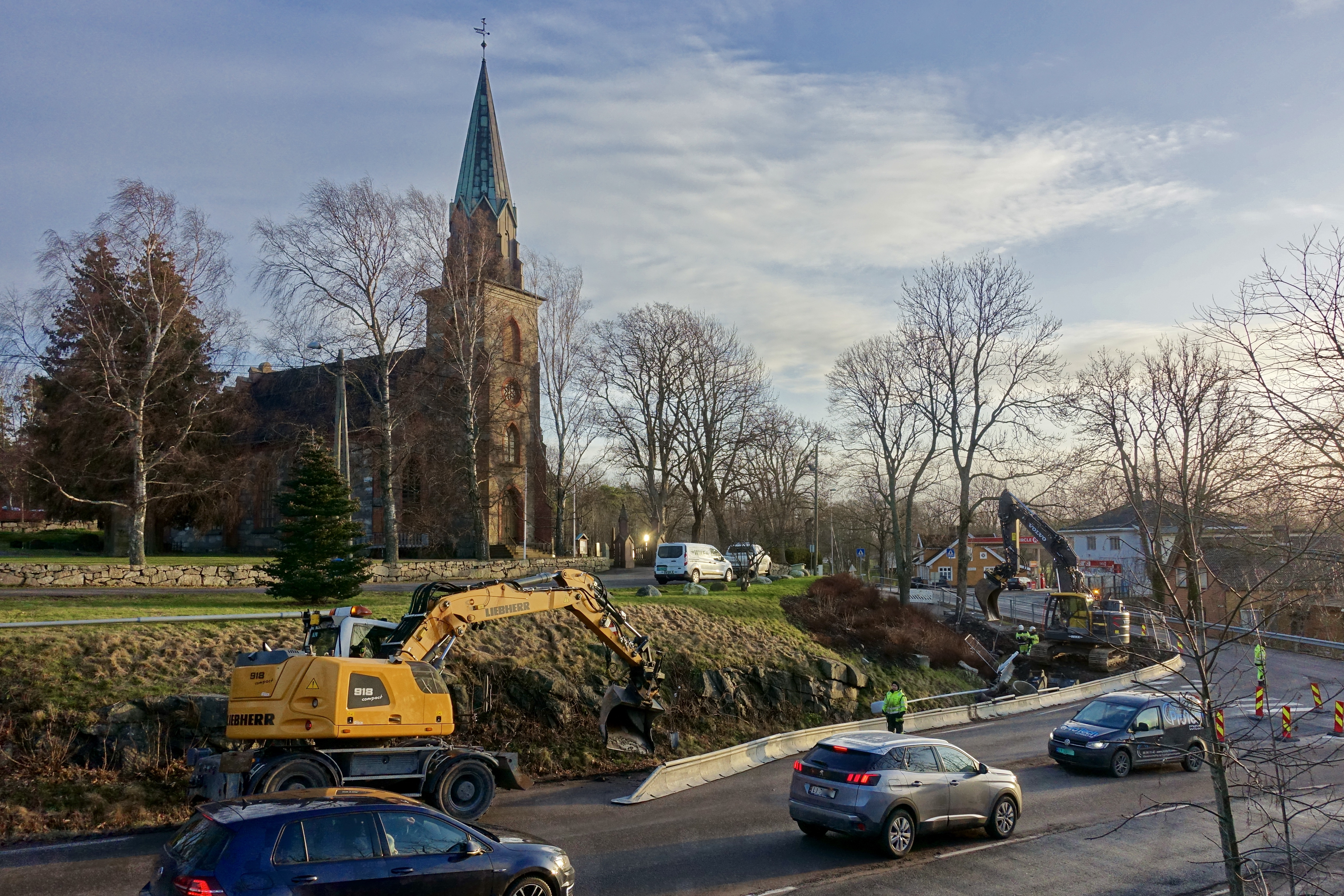
Tjøme Church

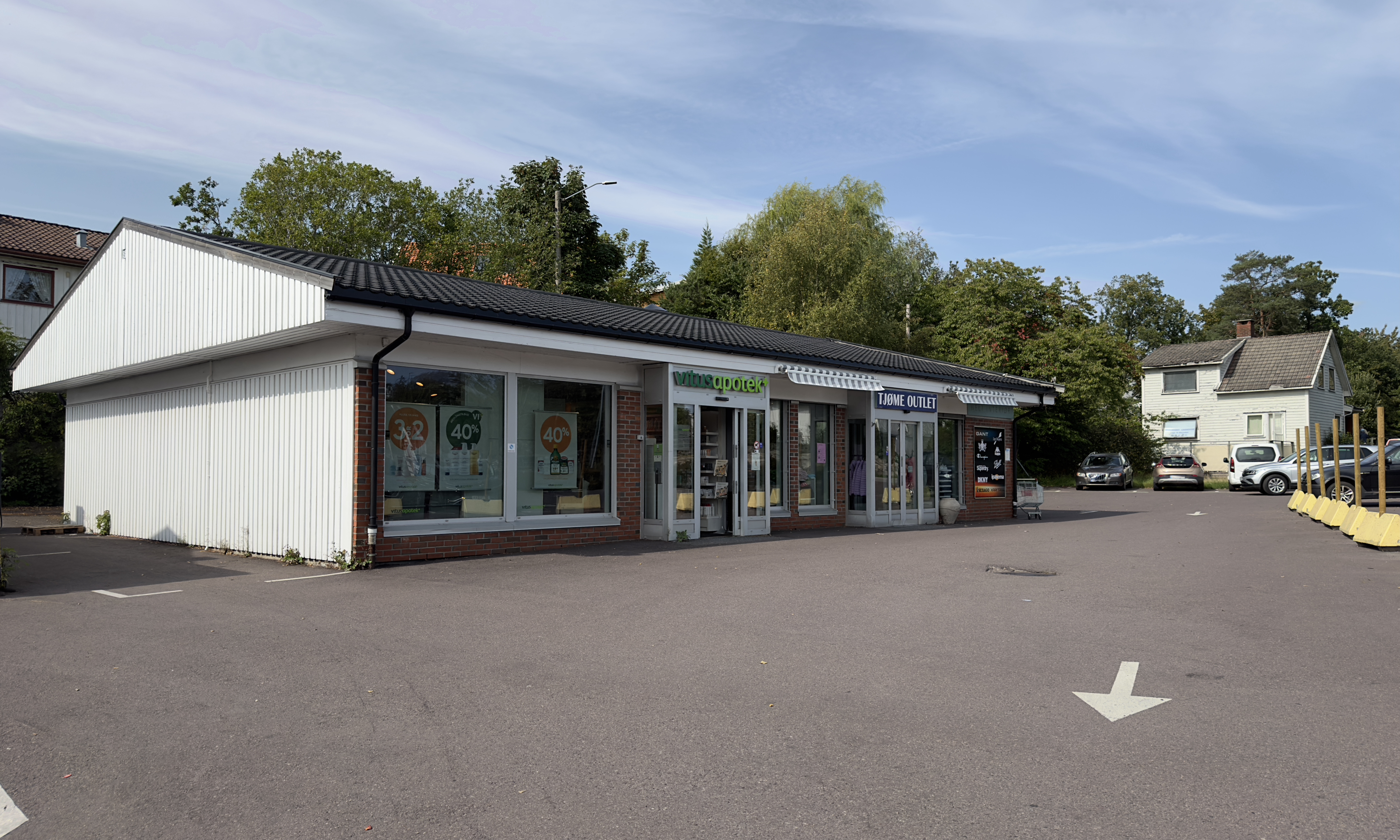

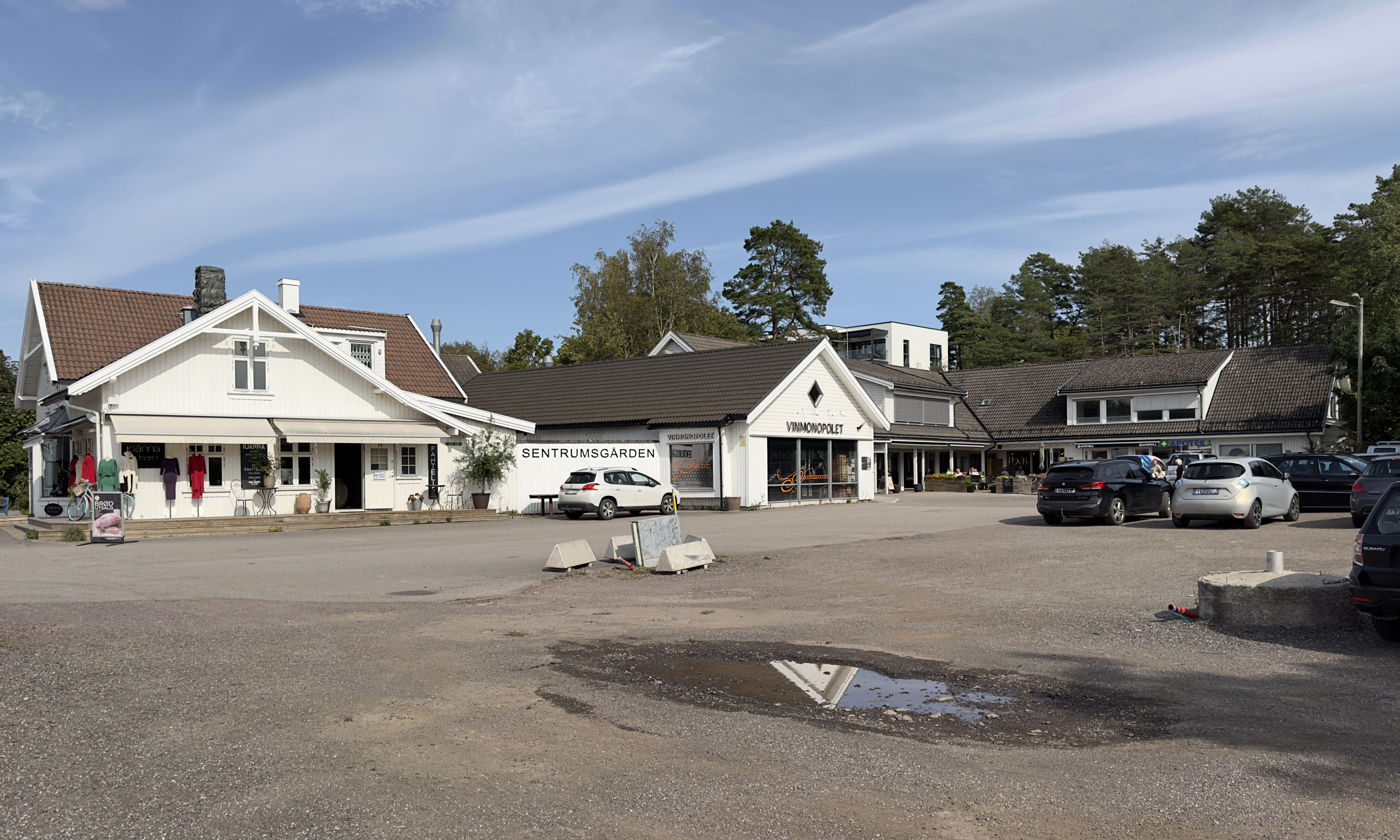

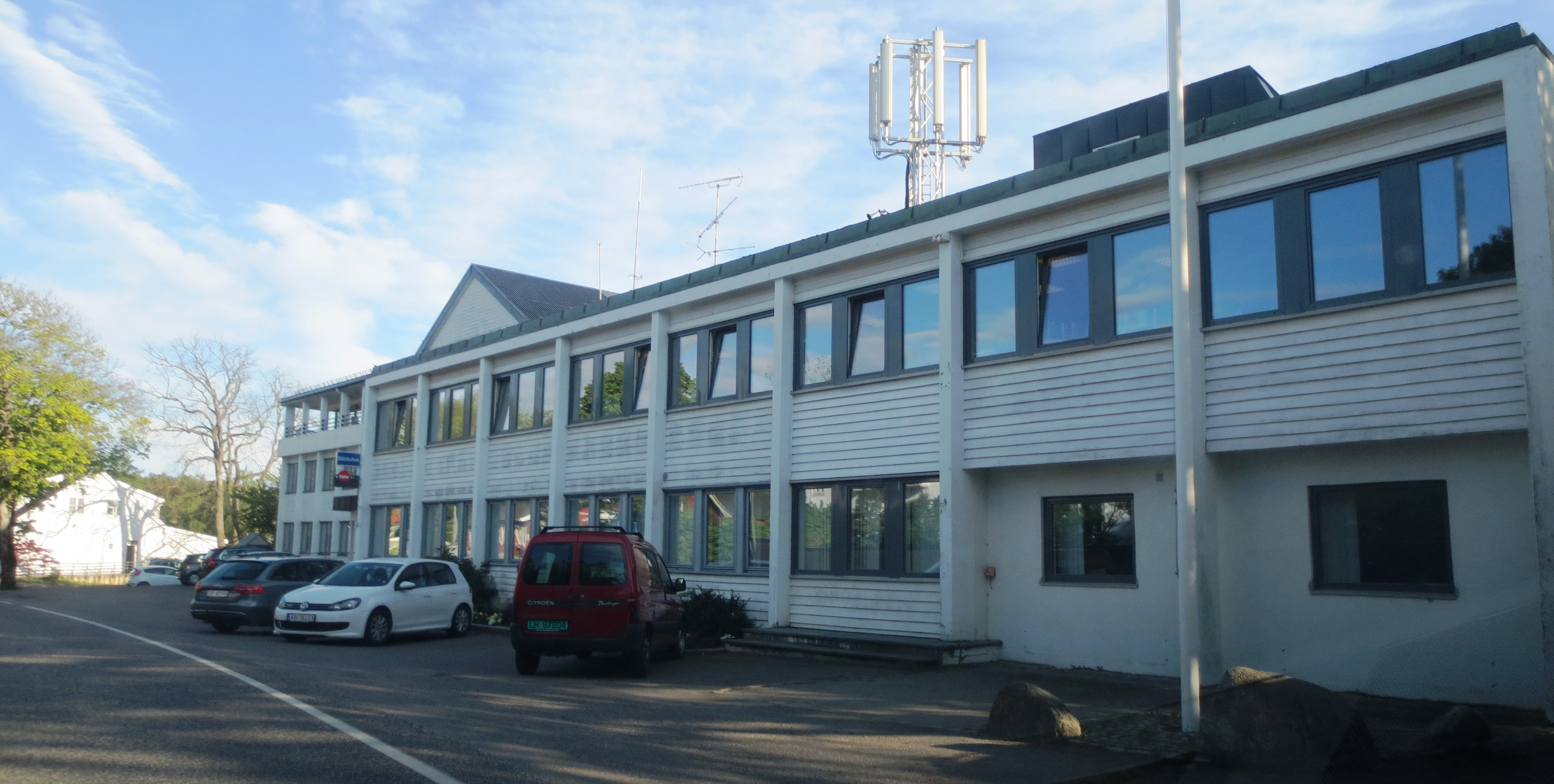
Municipal office building
