= Hulebak =

Village in Færder Municipality, Norway

Hulebak Hulebakk
- Village
- Interactive map of Hulebak
- Coordinates: 59.12399°N 10.41161°E
- Country: Norway
- Region: Eastern Norway
- County: Vestfold
- Municipality: Færder Municipality
- Elevation: 13 m (43 ft)
- Time zone: UTC+01:00 (CET)
  - Summer (DST): UTC+02:00 (CEST)
- Post Code: 3145 Tjøme

Hulebak is a village in Færder Municipality in Vestfold county, Norway. The village is located on the island of Tjøme, about 1.5 kilometres (0.93 mi) to the northeast of the village of Tjøme, about 2 kilometres (1.2 mi) to the northwest of the village of Ormelet, and about 2 kilometres (1.2 mi) to the south of the village of Grimestad.

The village of Hulebakk and the surrounding countryside had a population (in 2026) of 371. The village of Hulebakk is considered to be a part of the urban settlement of Tjøme, which covers the central part of the island. The 2.52-square-kilometre (620-acre) urban area has a population (2026) of 2,914 and a population density of 1,152 inhabitants per square kilometre (2,980/sq mi).
