= List of villages in Vestfold =

This is a list of villages in Vestfold, a county of Norway. Villages which are the administrative centers of their municipality are highlighted in blue and marked with this symbol (†) on this list. The term "villages" includes settlements, hamlets, and farm areas in Vestfold county. The list excludes cities/towns located in Vestfold. For other counties see the lists of villages in Norway.

Place	Coordinates	Postal Code	Municipality
Andebu	59°18′21″N 10°10′36″E	3158	Sandefjord
Barkåker	59°19′07″N 10°23′23″E	3157	Tønsberg
Basbergrønningen	59°17′17″N 10°29′14″E	3153	Tønsberg
Berg	58°59′28″N 9°54′55″E	3290	Larvik
Bergsåsen	59°21′50″N 10°14′51″E	3174	Tønsberg
Bjerkøya	59°35′27″N 10°03′15″E	3070	Holmestrand
Bjørnevåg	59°04′31″N 10°24′22″E	3145	Færder
Borgheim (†)	59°13′35″N 10°24′27″E	3140	Færder
Borre	59°22′55″N 10°27′23″E	3184	Horten
Brekkeåsen	59°24′47″N 10°16′49″E	3178	Tønsberg
Brøtsø	59°05′35″N 10°25′29″E	3145	Færder
Buerstad	59°10′11″N 10°25′27″E	3135	Færder
Duken	59°12′53″N 10°27′25″E	3133	Færder
Dunihagen	59°35′08″N 10°13′25″E	3070	Holmestrand
Eidsfoss	59°35′46″N 10°02′09″E	3095	Holmestrand
Eik	59°17′38″N 10°25′13″E	3122	Tønsberg
Eikeberg	59°38′18″N 10°14′17″E	3070	Holmestrand
Fevang	59°11′33″N 10°13′36″E	3239	Sandefjord
Fokserød	59°10′56″N 10°12′16″E	3241	Sandefjord
Fon	59°24′41″N 10°12′11″E	3174	Tønsberg
Fossan	59°23′12″N 10°15′22″E	3174	Tønsberg
Freberg	59°08′33″N 10°15′45″E	3228	Sandefjord
Føynland	59°14′16″N 10°26′45″E	3132	Færder
Galleberg	59°37′22″N 10°13′09″E	3070	Holmestrand
Gjone	59°10′48″N 9°59′25″E	3282	Larvik
Gon	59°05′59″N 10°23′36″E	3145	Færder
Gretteåsen	59°22′17″N 10°21′03″E	3176	Tønsberg
Grettebygd	59°27′01″N 10°20′26″E	3080	Tønsberg
Grimestad	59°08′09″N 10°24′17″E	3145	Færder
Gullhaug	59°30′10″N 10°14′58″E	3080	Holmestrand
Hafallen	59°07′11″N 10°16′21″E	3237	Sandefjord
Helgeroa	58°59′38″N 9°51′46″E	3295	Larvik
Hem	59°04′08″N 10°12′03″E	3280	Larvik
Hof	59°31′49″N 10°05′13″E	3090	Holmestrand
Hulebakk	59°07′35″N 10°24′35″E	3145	Færder
Husvik, Tønsberg	59°15′07″N 10°28′25″E	3124	Tønsberg
Husøy	59°14′17″N 10°27′50″E	3132	Tønsberg
Hvarnes	59°16′0″N 9°56′0″E	3282	Larvik
Hvasser	59°04′51″N 10°26′47″E	3148	Færder
Høyjord/Moa	59°22′0″N 10°7′0″E	3158	Sandefjord
Hårkollen	59°11′59″N 10°26′28″E	3138	Færder
Jarberg	59°19′37″N 10°16′46″E	3175	Tønsberg
Kaupang	59°02′09″N 10°06′19″E	3261	Larvik
Killingdalen	59°33′25″N 10°17′11″E	3070	Holmestrand
Kjerringvik	59°3′0″N 10°14′0″E	3280	Larvik
Kjose	59°7′0″N 9°55′0″E	3268	Larvik
Kjøpmannskjær	59°10′22″N 10°23′00″E	3143	Færder
Klever	59°39′0″N 10°12′0″E	3070	Holmestrand
Klopp	59°15′31″N 10°28′31″E	3124	Tønsberg
Kodal/Rismyr	59°12′52″N 10°08′17″E	3243	Sandefjord
Kvelde	59°11′0″N 9°59′0″E	3282	Larvik
Lahelle	59°8′0″N 10°17′0″E	3218	Sandefjord
Lauve	59°4′0″N 10°9′0″E	3280	Larvik
Linnestad	59°20′22″N 10°18′17″E	3175	Tønsberg
Melsomvik	59°13′26″N 10°20′41″E	3159	Sandefjord
Mågerø	59°8′0″N 10°26′0″E	3145	Færder
Nesbrygga	59°13′20″N 10°26′56″E	3133	Færder
Nevlunghamn	58°58′0″N 9°52′0″E	3296	Larvik
Nykirke	59°25′19″N 10°22′51″E	3180	Horten
Omsland	59°07′52″N 9°52′50″E	3268	Larvik
Ormelet	59°6′0″N 10°25′0″E	3145	Færder
Oterbekk	59°11′0″N 10°27′0″E	3135	Færder
Ramnes	59°20′52″N 10°15′25″E	3175	Tønsberg
Revetal	59°22′21″N 10°15′47″E	3174	Tønsberg
Rånerudåsen	59°25′42″N 10°17′17″E	3178	Tønsberg
Råstad	59°10′0″N 10°16′0″E	3239	Sandefjord
Sande i Vestfold	59°35′12″N 10°12′29″E	3070	Holmestrand
Selvik	59°34′8″N 10°15′30″E	3070	Holmestrand
Sem	59°17′0″N 10°20′0″E	3170	Tønsberg
Skallestad	59°12′23″N 10°26′31″E	3138	Færder
Skinmo	59°07′15″N 10°07′42″E	3270	Larvik
Skjerve	59°12′16″N 10°24′47″E	3140	Færder
Skjervik/Holm	59°33′10″N 10°14′13″E	3070	Holmestrand
Skoppum	59°23′0″N 10°25′0″E	3185	Horten
Solløkka	59°08′23″N 10°17′49″E	3233	Sandefjord
Solvang	59°06′40″N 10°24′10″E	3145	Færder
Steinsholt	59°18′33″N 9°52′47″E	3277	Larvik
Stokke	59°13′0″N 10°17′0″E	3160	Sandefjord
Storevar	59°12′19″N 10°20′14″E	3160	Sandefjord
Strand	59°06′09″N 10°17′11″E	3237	Sandefjord
Strengsdal	59°10′21″N 10°24′36″E	3135	Færder
Sukke	59°18′57″N 10°09′25″E	3158	Sandefjord
Sundbyfoss	59°30′43″N 10°07′32″E	3092	Holmestrand
Sundene	59°09′58″N 10°23′32″E	3145	Færder
Svarstad	59°24′06″N 9°57′41″E	3275	Larvik
Svelvik	59°08′09″N 10°22′59″E	3145	Færder
Svinevoll	59°24′56″N 10°14′19″E	3178	Tønsberg
Sørby	59°25′11″N 10°16′36″E	3178	Tønsberg
Teie	59°15′05″N 10°24′52″E	3106	Tønsberg
Tenvik	59°11′0″N 10°22′0″E	3140	Færder
Tjøllingvollen	59°03′21″N 10°07′37″E	3280	Larvik
Tjøme	59°7′0″N 10°24′0″E	3145	Færder
Torød	59°11′0″N 10°27′0″E	3135	Færder
Tveteneåsen	59°02′08″N 9°59′39″E	3265	Larvik
Tømmerholt/Glomstein	59°11′47″N 10°22′28″E	3140	Færder
Ula	59°1′0″N 10°12′0″E	3280	Larvik
Undrumsdal	59°22′25″N 10°22′00″E	3178	Tønsberg
Unneberg	59°09′16″N 10°15′03″E	3239	Sandefjord
Valberg/Fossnes	59°16′49″N 10°15′31″E	3171	Sandefjord
Vallø	59°15′45″N 10°29′55″E	3150	Tønsberg
Vassås	59°29′06″N 10°05′27″E	3090	Holmestrand
Vear	59°15′34″N 10°21′39″E	3173	Sandefjord
Veierland	59°08′55″N 10°20′14″E	3144	Færder
Verdens Ende	59°03′30″N 10°24′26″E	3147	Færder
Verningen	59°05′32″N 10°06′07″E	3270	Larvik
Vestskogen	59°14′42″N 10°23′57″E	3142	Færder
Vidaråsen	59°17′04″N 10°04′57″E	3158	Sandefjord
Vivestad	59°25′49″N 10°08′02″E	3175	Tønsberg
Vollen	59°12′51″N 10°25′38″E	3140	Færder
Årøysund	59°10′50″N 10°27′18″E	3135	Færder
Ås	59°23′45″N 10°14′18″E	3170	Tønsberg
Åsgårdstrand	59°20′56″N 10°28′3″E	3179	Horten
