= Skallestad =

Village in Færder, Norway

- Village
- Interactive map of Skallestad
- Coordinates: 59.20582°N 10.44469°E
- Country: Norway
- Region: Eastern Norway
- County: Vestfold
- Municipality: Færder Municipality
- Elevation: 16 m (52 ft)
- Time zone: UTC+01:00 (CET)
  - Summer (DST): UTC+02:00 (CEST)
- Post Code: 3138 Skallestad

Skallestad is a village in Færder Municipality in Vestfold county, Norway. The village is located on the eastern coast of the island of Nøtterøy. The village lies about 1 kilometre (0.62 mi) to the northwest of Oterbekk and Hårkollen, about 1.5 kilometres (0.93 mi) southeast of the village of Vollen, and about 1.5 kilometres (0.93 mi) south of the villages of Duken and Nesbrygga.

The village of Skallestad and the surrounding countryside has a population (in 2026) of 720. It is considered to be part of the urban city of Tønsberg metropolitan area which includes the central city area plus the northern and eastern parts of the island of Nøtterøy.
