= Skjerve =

Village in Færder, Norway

- Village
- Interactive map of Skjerve
- Coordinates: 59.20436°N 10.41313°E
- Country: Norway
- Region: Eastern Norway
- County: Vestfold
- Municipality: Færder Municipality
- Elevation: 13 m (43 ft)
- Time zone: UTC+01:00 (CET)
  - Summer (DST): UTC+02:00 (CEST)
- Post Code: 3140 Nøtterøy

Skjerve is a village in Færder Municipality in Vestfold county, Norway. The village is located in the central part of the island of Nøtterøy. Skjerve is located about 2 kilometres (1.2 mi) east of the village of Glomstein, about 3 kilometres (1.9 mi) south of the village of Borgheim, about 2 kilometres (1.2 mi) west of the villages of Hårkollen and Skallestad, and about 3 kilometres (1.9 mi) north of the villages of Kjøpmannskjær and Strengsdal.

The village of Skjerve and the surrounding countryside has a population (in 2026) of 182.
