= Himberg (disambiguation) =

Himberg may refer to:

== People ==
- Timo Himberg, a Finnish ringette coach

== Places ==
- Himberg, a municipality in the district of Bruck an der Leitha in Austria
- Himberg, Norway, an exclave and village in Sandefjord Municipality in Vestfold county, Norway
- Himberg (Swabian Jura), a mountain in Baden-Württemberg, Germany
