= Unneberg =

Village in Sandefjord, Norway

- Village
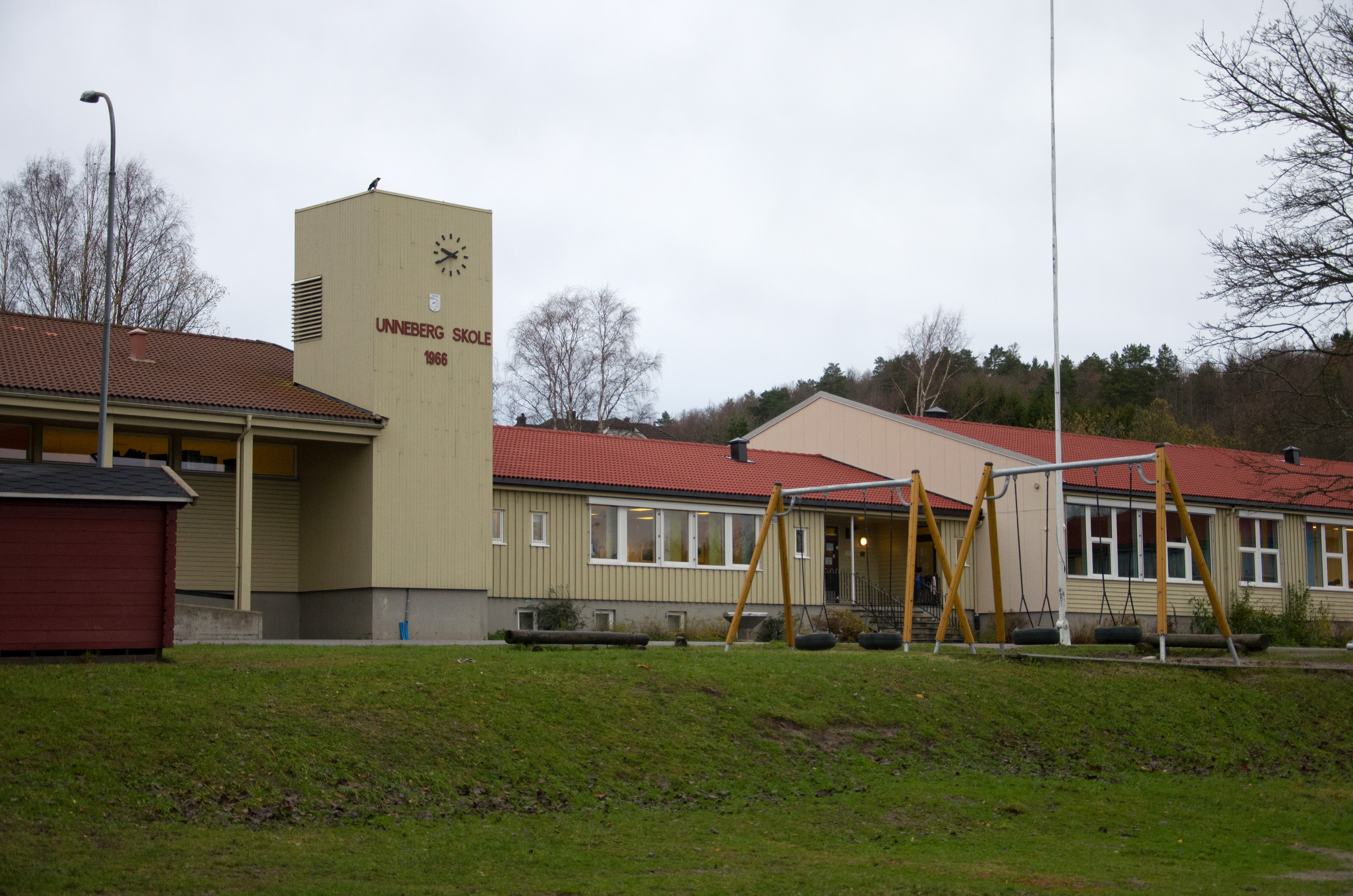
- View of the village school
- Interactive map of Unneberg
- Coordinates: 59.15531°N 10.24272°E
- Country: Norway
- Region: Eastern Norway
- County: Vestfold
- Municipality: Sandefjord Municipality
- Elevation: 35 m (115 ft)
- Time zone: UTC+01:00 (CET)
  - Summer (DST): UTC+02:00 (CEST)
- Post Code: 3228 Sandefjord

Unneberg is a village in Sandefjord Municipality in Vestfold county, Norway. The village is located between the village of Gokstad to the south and the village of Råstad to the north. The villages of Helgerød, Lahelle, and Solløkka are located to the southeast.

Unneberg is considered to be one of the outer neighborhoods in the eastern part of the city of Sandefjord which has an area of 26.14 square kilometres (10.09 sq mi) and a population (in 2026) of 49,186. The statistical area Unneberg, which also can include the peripheral parts of the village as well as the surrounding countryside, has a population of 616.

From being primarily an agricultural area throughout the 1950s and early 1960s, Unneberg changed drastically in the late 1960s and early 1970s. It is now home to small neighborhoods, grocery stores, and playgrounds. The street names in Unneberg are named for plant species, including Common hyacinth (Svibelveien), Anemone (Anemoneveien), Crocus (Krokusveien), Common Snowdrop (Sneklokkeveien), Tulip (Tuplianveien), Lily (Liljeveien), and others.
