= Buerstad =

Village in Færder Municipality, Norway

- Village
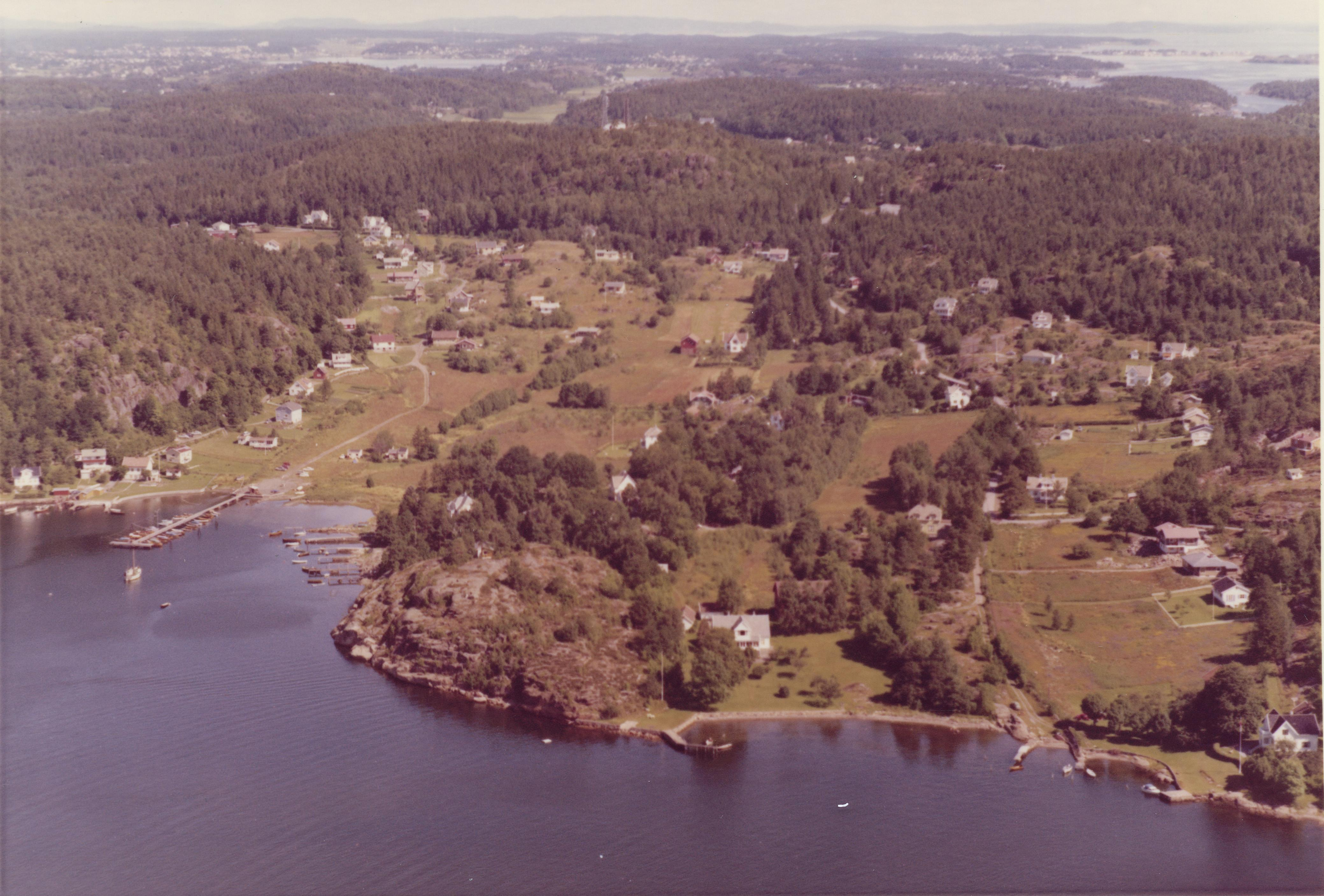
- View of the village area
- Interactive map of Buerstad
- Coordinates: 59.16969°N 10.42415°E
- Country: Norway
- Region: Eastern Norway
- County: Vestfold
- Municipality: Færder Municipality
- Elevation: 3 m (9.8 ft)
- Time zone: UTC+01:00 (CET)
  - Summer (DST): UTC+02:00 (CEST)
- Post Code: 3135 Torød

Buerstad is a village in Færder Municipality in Vestfold county, Norway. The village is located on the southern coast of the island of Nøtterøy. The village of Buerstad is located about 2 kilometres (1.2 mi) to the east of the village of Strengsdal and about 2 kilometres (1.2 mi) to the southwest of the village of Torød where the Torød Church is located.

The village of Buerstad and the surrounding countryside has a population (in 2026) of 524.
