= Vollen, Vestfold =

Village in Færder, Norway

Vollen
- Village
- Interactive map of Vollen
- Coordinates: 59.21411°N 10.42716°E
- Country: Norway
- Region: Eastern Norway
- County: Vestfold
- Municipality: Færder Municipality
- Elevation: 17 m (56 ft)
- Time zone: UTC+01:00 (CET)
  - Summer (DST): UTC+02:00 (CEST)
- Post Code: 3140 Nøtterøy

Vollen is a village in Færder Municipality in Vestfold county, Norway. The village is located on the island of Nøtterøy. The village lies about 2–3 kilometres (1.2–1.9 mi) to the northwest of the villages of Oterbekk and Hårkollen, about 1.5 kilometres (0.93 mi) west of the villages of Duken and Nesbrygga, and about 2 kilometres (1.2 mi) to the southeast of the village of Borgheim (the municipal centre of Færder).

The village of Vollen and the surrounding countryside has a population (in 2026) of 693. It is considered to be part of the urban city of Tønsberg metropolitan area which includes the central city area plus the northern and eastern parts of the island of Nøtterøy.
