= Tenvik =

Village in Færder, Norway

Tenvik Tennvik
- Village
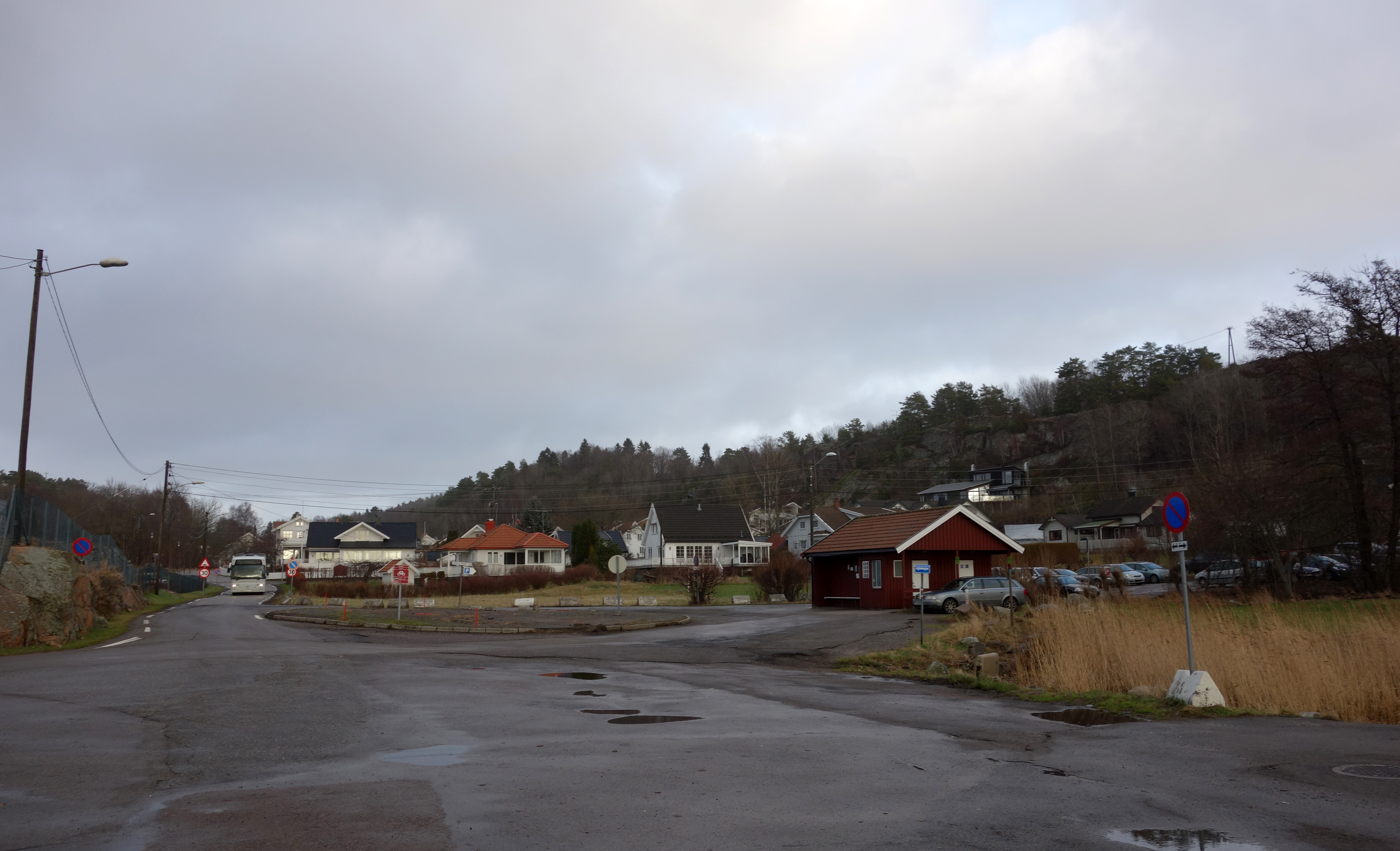
- View of the village
- Interactive map of Tenvik
- Coordinates: 59.17481°N 10.36547°E
- Country: Norway
- Region: Eastern Norway
- County: Vestfold
- Municipality: Færder Municipality
- Elevation: 2 m (6.6 ft)
- Time zone: UTC+01:00 (CET)
  - Summer (DST): UTC+02:00 (CEST)
- Post Code: 3140 Nøtterøy

Tenvik is a village in Færder Municipality in Vestfold county, Norway. The village is located on the coast of the island of Nøtterøy, along the Tønsbergfjorden. It is located about 1 kilometre (0.62 mi) west of the village of Kjøpmannskjær, about 2 kilometres (1.2 mi) to the northwest of the village of Sundene, and about 2 kilometres (1.2 mi) south of the village of Glomstein.

The island of Veierland is located in the fjord about 1.5 kilometres (0.93 mi) to the southwest of the village. There is a ferry from Tenvik to Veierland.

The village of Tenvik and the surrounding countryside had a population in 2026 of 172 people.
