= Skinmo =

Village in Larvik, Norway

Skinmo Skinnmo
- Village
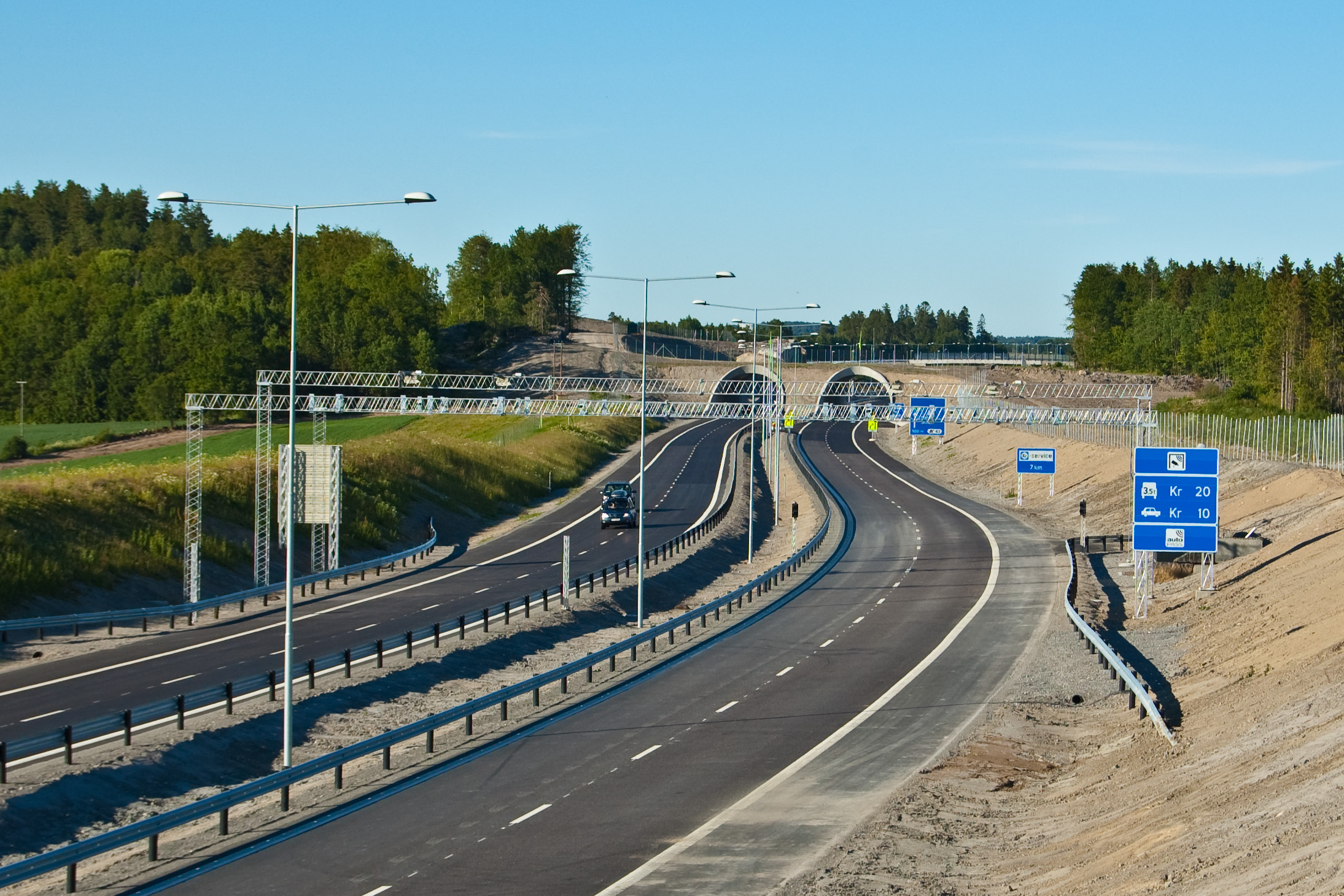
- View of the E18 highway passing through Skinmo
- Interactive map of Skinmo
- Coordinates: 59.12072°N 10.1284°E
- Country: Norway
- Region: Eastern Norway
- County: Vestfold
- Municipality: Larvik Municipality
- Elevation: 67 m (220 ft)
- Time zone: UTC+01:00 (CET)
  - Summer (DST): UTC+02:00 (CEST)
- Post Code: 3270 Larvik

Skinmo is a village in Larvik Municipality in Vestfold county, Norway. The village is located on the eastern edge of the municipality, along the European route E18 highway, just west of the border with Sandefjord Municipality.

The village of Verningen lies about 2.5 kilometres (1.6 mi) to the southwest, the village of Himberg lies about 2 kilometres (1.2 mi) to the south, and the town of Sandefjord lies about 5 kilometres (3.1 mi) to the east.

== History ==
The village was part of the old Hedrum Municipality until 1988 when it became part of Larvik Municipality.
