= Strengsdal =

Village in Færder, Norway

- Village
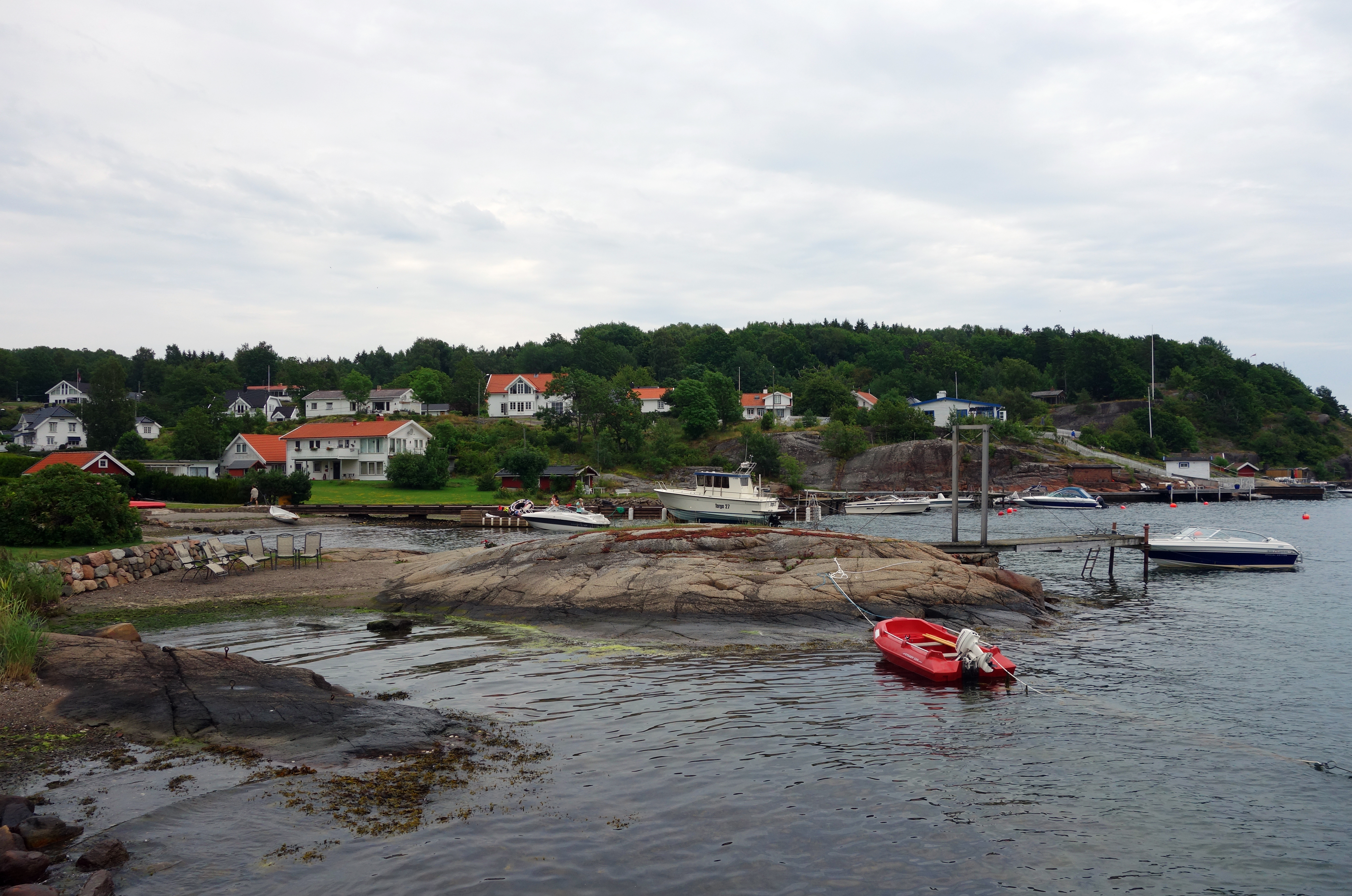
- View of the village harbor
- Interactive map of Strengsdal
- Coordinates: 59.17237°N 10.41011°E
- Country: Norway
- Region: Eastern Norway
- County: Vestfold
- Municipality: Færder Municipality
- Elevation: 12 m (39 ft)
- Time zone: UTC+01:00 (CET)
  - Summer (DST): UTC+02:00 (CEST)
- Post Code: 3135 Torød

Strengsdal is a village in Færder Municipality in Vestfold county, Norway. The village is located on the southern coast of the island of Nøtterøy. It lies about 2 kilometres (1.2 mi) east of the village of Kjøpmannskjær and about 1 kilometre (0.62 mi) west of the village of Buerstad. The village of Torød and the Torød Church lie about 2 kilometres (1.2 mi) to the northeast.

The village of Strengsdal and the surrounding countryside has a population (in 2026) of 184.
