= Freberg =

Village in Sandefjord Municipality, Norway

- Village
- Interactive map of Freberg
- Coordinates: 59.14259°N 10.26238°E
- Country: Norway
- Region: Eastern Norway
- County: Vestfold
- Municipality: Sandefjord Municipality
- Elevation: 19 m (62 ft)
- Time zone: UTC+01:00 (CET)
  - Summer (DST): UTC+02:00 (CEST)
- Post Code: 3228 Sandefjord

Freberg is a small, rural village in Sandefjord Municipality in Vestfold county, Norway. The village is located between the villages of Gokstad to the west, Helgerød to the northeast, and Lahelle to the southeast.

Freberg is considered to be one of the outer neighborhoods in the eastern part of the city of Sandefjord which has an area of 26.14 square kilometres (10.09 sq mi) and a population (in 2026) of 49,186. The statistical area of Freberg, which also can include the peripheral parts of the village as well as the surrounding countryside, has a population of 119.
