= Hafallen =

Village in Sandefjord Municipality, Norway

- Village
- Interactive map of Hafallen
- Coordinates: 59.1196°N 10.27246°E
- Country: Norway
- Region: Eastern Norway
- County: Vestfold
- Municipality: Sandefjord Municipality
- Elevation: 34 m (112 ft)
- Time zone: UTC+01:00 (CET)
  - Summer (DST): UTC+02:00 (CEST)
- Post Code: 3237 Sandefjord

Hafallen is a village in Sandefjord Municipality in Vestfold county, Norway. The village is located along the Mefjorden in the northern part of Østerøya peninsula. It is located about 5 kilometres (3.1 mi) to the southeast of the centre of the city of Sandefjord, about 1 kilometre (0.62 mi) north of the village of Strand, and about 2 kilometres (1.2 mi) south of the village of Lahelle.

Hafallen is considered to be one of the outer neighborhoods in the eastern part of the city of Sandefjord which has an area of 26.14 square kilometres (10.09 sq mi) and a population (in 2026) of 49,186. The statistical area of Hafallen, which also can include the peripheral parts of the village as well as the surrounding countryside, has a population of 143.
