= Duken =

Village in Færder Municipality, Norway

- Village
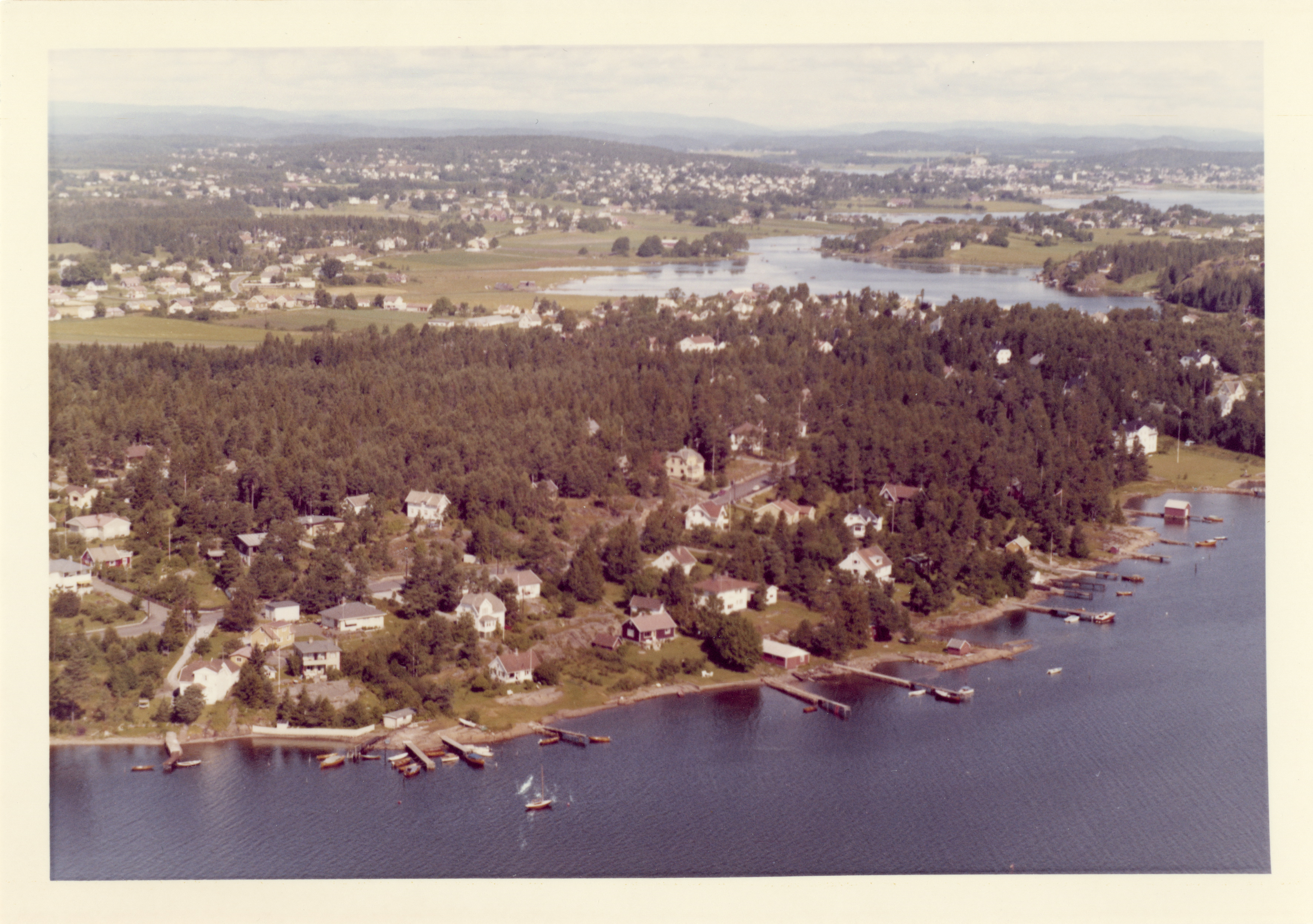
- View of the village (in 1968)
- Interactive map of Duken
- Coordinates: 59.21484°N 10.45685°E
- Country: Norway
- Region: Eastern Norway
- County: Vestfold
- Municipality: Færder Municipality
- Elevation: 10 m (33 ft)
- Time zone: UTC+01:00 (CET)
  - Summer (DST): UTC+02:00 (CEST)
- Post Code: 3133 Duken

Duken is a village in Færder Municipality in Vestfold county, Norway. The village is located on the eastern coast of the island of Nøtterøy. The village lies about 1 kilometre (0.62 mi) south of the village of Nesbrygga, about 2 kilometres (1.2 mi) east of the village of Vollen, and about 1 kilometre (0.62 mi) north of the villages of Skallestad and Hårkollen.

The village of Duken and the surrounding countryside has a population (in 2026) of 738. It is considered to be part of the urban city of Tønsberg metropolitan area which includes the central city area plus the northern and eastern parts of the island of Nøtterøy.
