= Strand, Vestfold =

Village in Sandefjord, Norway

Strand
- Village
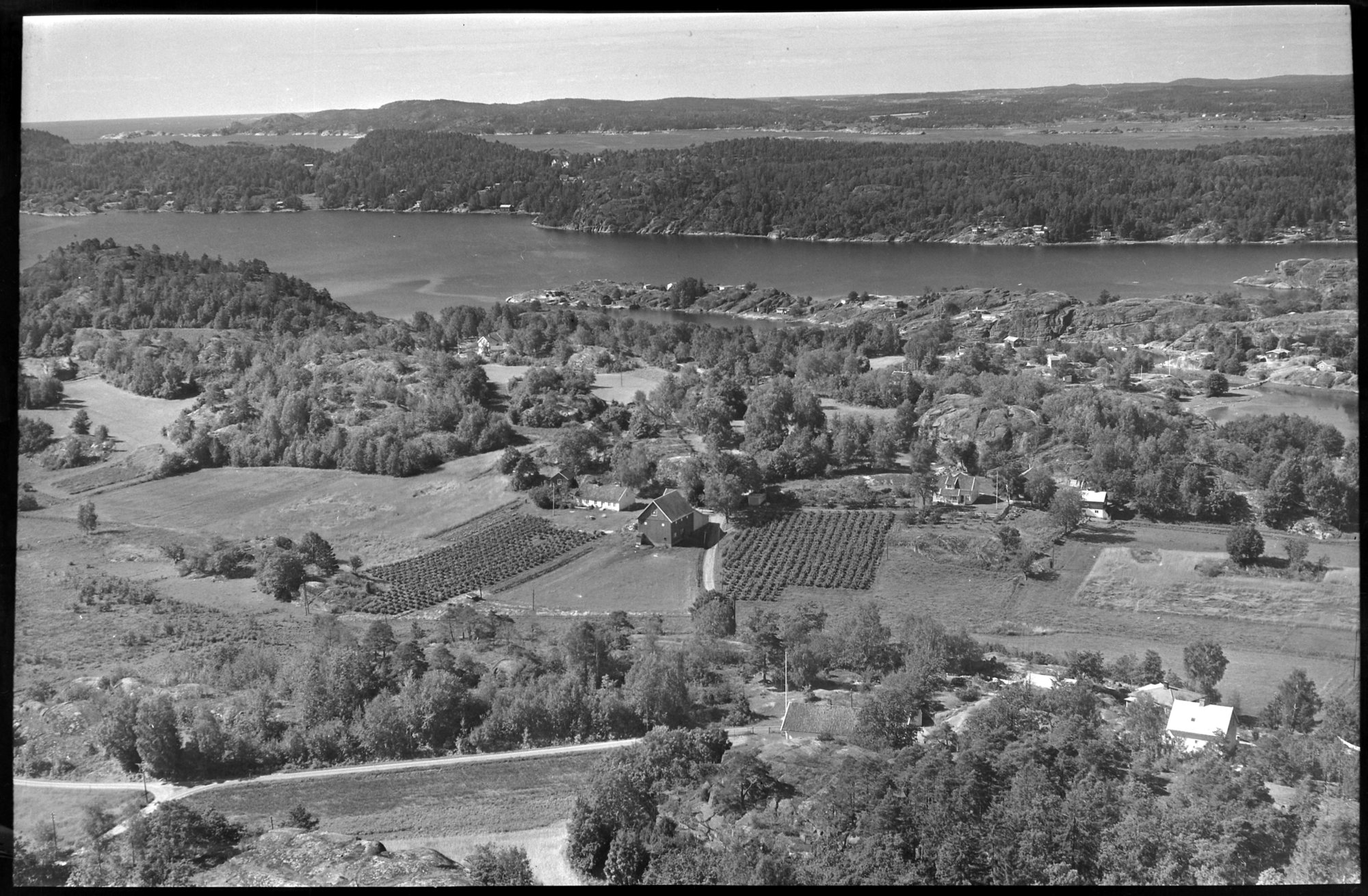
- View of the village
- Interactive map of Strand
- Coordinates: 59.10244°N 10.28647°E
- Country: Norway
- Region: Eastern Norway
- County: Vestfold
- Municipality: Sandefjord Municipality
- Elevation: 6 m (20 ft)
- Time zone: UTC+01:00 (CET)
  - Summer (DST): UTC+02:00 (CEST)
- Post Code: 3237 Sandefjord

Strand is a village in Sandefjord Municipality in Vestfold county, Norway. The village is located along the Mefjorden in the middle part of Østerøya peninsula, about 6 kilometres (3.7 mi) to the southeast of the centre of the city of Sandefjord, about 1 kilometre (0.62 mi) south of the village of Hafallen, and about 3 kilometres (1.9 mi) south of the village of Lahelle.

Strand is considered to be one of the outer neighborhoods in the eastern part of the city of Sandefjord which has an area of 26.14 square kilometres (10.09 sq mi) and a population (in 2026) of 49,186. The statistical area Strand, which also can include the peripheral parts of the village as well as the surrounding countryside, has a population of 184.
