= Storevar =

Village in Sandefjord, Norway

- Village
- Interactive map of Storevar
- Coordinates: 59.20282°N 10.32489°E
- Country: Norway
- Region: Eastern Norway
- County: Vestfold
- Municipality: Sandefjord Municipality
- Elevation: 36 m (118 ft)
- Time zone: UTC+01:00 (CET)
  - Summer (DST): UTC+02:00 (CEST)
- Post Code: 3160 Stokke

Storevar is a village in Sandefjord Municipality in Vestfold county, Norway. The village is located along the Tønsbergfjorden, just south of the village of Melsomvik, about 4 kilometres (2.5 mi) to the southeast of the large village of Stokke, and about 5 kilometres (3.1 mi) to the north of the village of Råstad.

The 0.2-square-kilometre (49-acre) village had a population (2014) of 339 and a population density of 1,695 inhabitants per square kilometre (4,390/sq mi). Since 2015, the population and area data for this village area has not been separately tracked by Statistics Norway, but instead it has been considered part of the Melsomvik urban area.

There are three islands in the fjord just outside Storevar: Gåsøykalven, Gåsøy, and Ravnø. During winters, the ocean occasionally freezes and makes it possible to hike to the islands from the village.

== Climate ==
Climate data for Melsom 1991-2020 (26 m, avg high/low 2003–2025)
Month	Jan	Feb	Mar	Apr	May	Jun	Jul	Aug	Sep	Oct	Nov	Dec	Year
Mean daily maximum °C (°F)	1.1 (34.0)	2.0 (35.6)	6.1 (43.0)	11.3 (52.3)	16.4 (61.5)	20.4 (68.7)	22.3 (72.1)	21 (70)	17.1 (62.8)	11 (52)	6 (43)	2.4 (36.3)	11.4 (52.6)
Daily mean °C (°F)	−1.6 (29.1)	−1.5 (29.3)	1.4 (34.5)	5.9 (42.6)	11.1 (52.0)	14.9 (58.8)	17.1 (62.8)	16.1 (61.0)	12.1 (53.8)	7.0 (44.6)	2.9 (37.2)	−0.8 (30.6)	7.1 (44.7)
Mean daily minimum °C (°F)	−4.5 (23.9)	−4.2 (24.4)	−2 (28)	1.9 (35.4)	6.6 (43.9)	10.7 (51.3)	12.9 (55.2)	12.0 (53.6)	9.1 (48.4)	4.5 (40.1)	0.8 (33.4)	−3.1 (26.4)	3.7 (38.7)
Average precipitation mm (inches)	93 (3.7)	66 (2.6)	65 (2.6)	61 (2.4)	72 (2.8)	81 (3.2)	75 (3.0)	108 (4.3)	114 (4.5)	136 (5.4)	125 (4.9)	101 (4.0)	1,097 (43.2)
Source: yr.no (mean, precipitation)
