= Glomstein =

Village in Færder Municipality, Norway

- Village
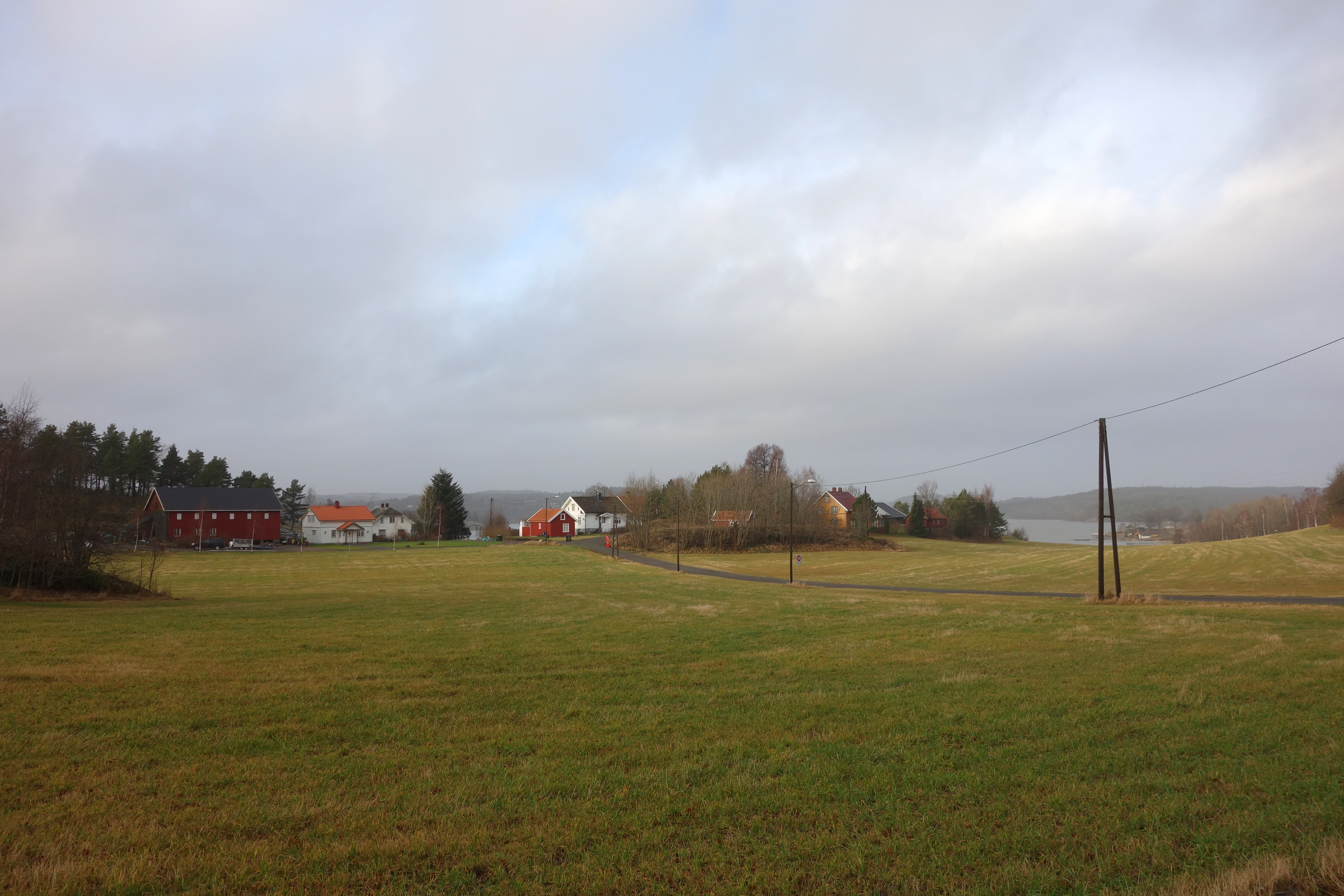
- View of the village area
- Interactive map of Glomstein
- Coordinates: 59.19818°N 10.36746°E
- Country: Norway
- Region: Eastern Norway
- County: Vestfold
- Municipality: Færder Municipality

Area
  - Total: 0.4 km^{2} (0.15 sq mi)
- Elevation: 19 m (62 ft)

Population (2026)
  - Total: 518
  - Density: 1,295/km^{2} (3,350/sq mi)
- Time zone: UTC+01:00 (CET)
  - Summer (DST): UTC+02:00 (CEST)
- Post Code: 3140 Nøtterøy

Glomstein is a village in Færder Municipality in Vestfold county, Norway. The village is located on the western shore of the island of Nøtterøy, along the Tønsbergfjorden. The village lies about 2.5 kilometres (1.6 mi) north of the village of Tenvik, about 3 kilometres (1.9 mi) to the northwest of the village o Kjøpmannskjær, about 2 kilometres (1.2 mi) east of the village of Skjerve, and about 4.5 kilometres (2.8 mi) south of the village of Borgheim.

The 0.4-square-kilometre (99-acre) village has a population (2026) of 518 and a population density of 1,295 inhabitants per square kilometre (3,350/sq mi). The village is mainly a residential area.
