= Sundene =

Village in Færder, Norway

- Village
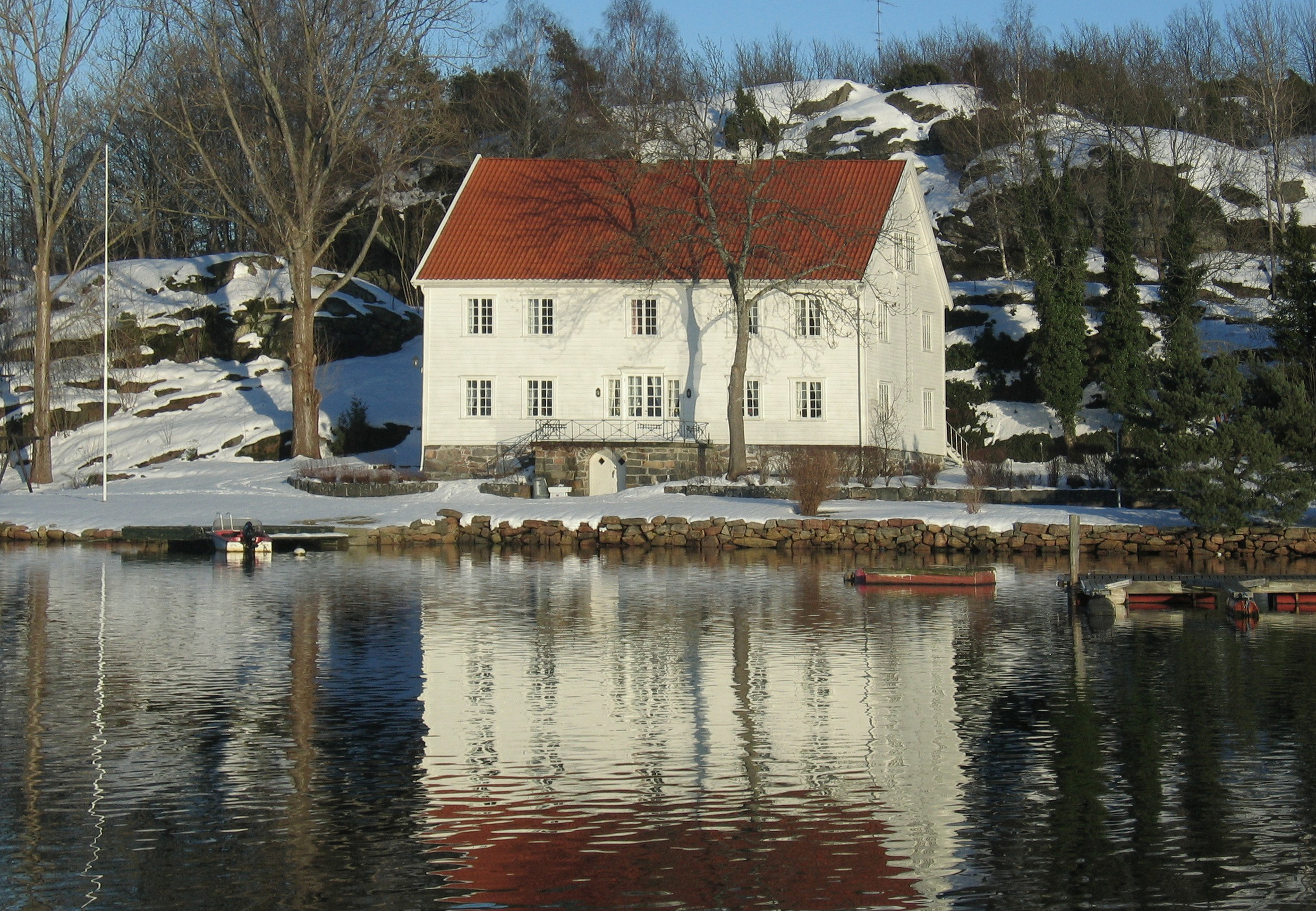
- View of a coastal house at Sundene
- Interactive map of Sundene
- Coordinates: 59.16598°N 10.39234°E
- Country: Norway
- Region: Eastern Norway
- County: Vestfold
- Municipality: Færder Municipality
- Elevation: 23 m (75 ft)
- Time zone: UTC+01:00 (CET)
  - Summer (DST): UTC+02:00 (CEST)
- Post Code: 3145 Tjøme

Sundene is a village in Færder Municipality in Vestfold county, Norway. The village is located on the island of Tjøme, about 6 kilometres (3.7 mi) to the north of the village of Tjøme, about 4 kilometres (2.5 mi) to the north of the village of Svelvik, and about 3 kilometres (1.9 mi) to the northwest of the village of Grimestad. A bridge connects Sundene with the village of Kjøpmannskjær which lies about 1 kilometre (0.62 mi) to the northwest on the island of Nøtterøy.

The village of Sundene and the surrounding countryside had a population (in 2026) of 479.
