= Helgerød =

Village in Sandefjord Municipality, Norway

- Village
- Interactive map of Helgerød
- Coordinates: 59.14856°N 10.2836°E
- Country: Norway
- Region: Eastern Norway
- County: Vestfold
- Municipality: Sandefjord Municipality
- Elevation: 14 m (46 ft)
- Time zone: UTC+01:00 (CET)
  - Summer (DST): UTC+02:00 (CEST)
- Post Code: 3233 Sandefjord

Helgerød is a village in Sandefjord Municipality in Vestfold county, Norway. The village is located about 1 kilometre (0.62 mi) to the north of the villages of Solløkka and Lahelle, about 2 kilometres (1.2 mi) to the northeast of the village of Freberg, and about 5 kilometres (3.1 mi) to the east of the city of Sandefjord.

Helgerød is considered to be one of the outer neighborhoods in the eastern part of the city of Sandefjord which has an area of 26.14 square kilometres (10.09 sq mi) and a population (in 2026) of 49,186. The statistical area of Helgerød, which also can include the peripheral parts of the village as well as the surrounding countryside, has a population of 368.

Helgerød was originally the name of a farm. The name derives from either Helgaruð (from the male name Helgi) or Helguruð (from the female name Helga). A sports hall known as Helgerødhallen was established by Helgerød elementary school in 1986. A nearby park was constructed in 2007 and includes a BMX bike trail, ball pond, and skatepark. Two handball fields were built here in 2008.
