= Torød =

Village in Færder, Norway

- Village
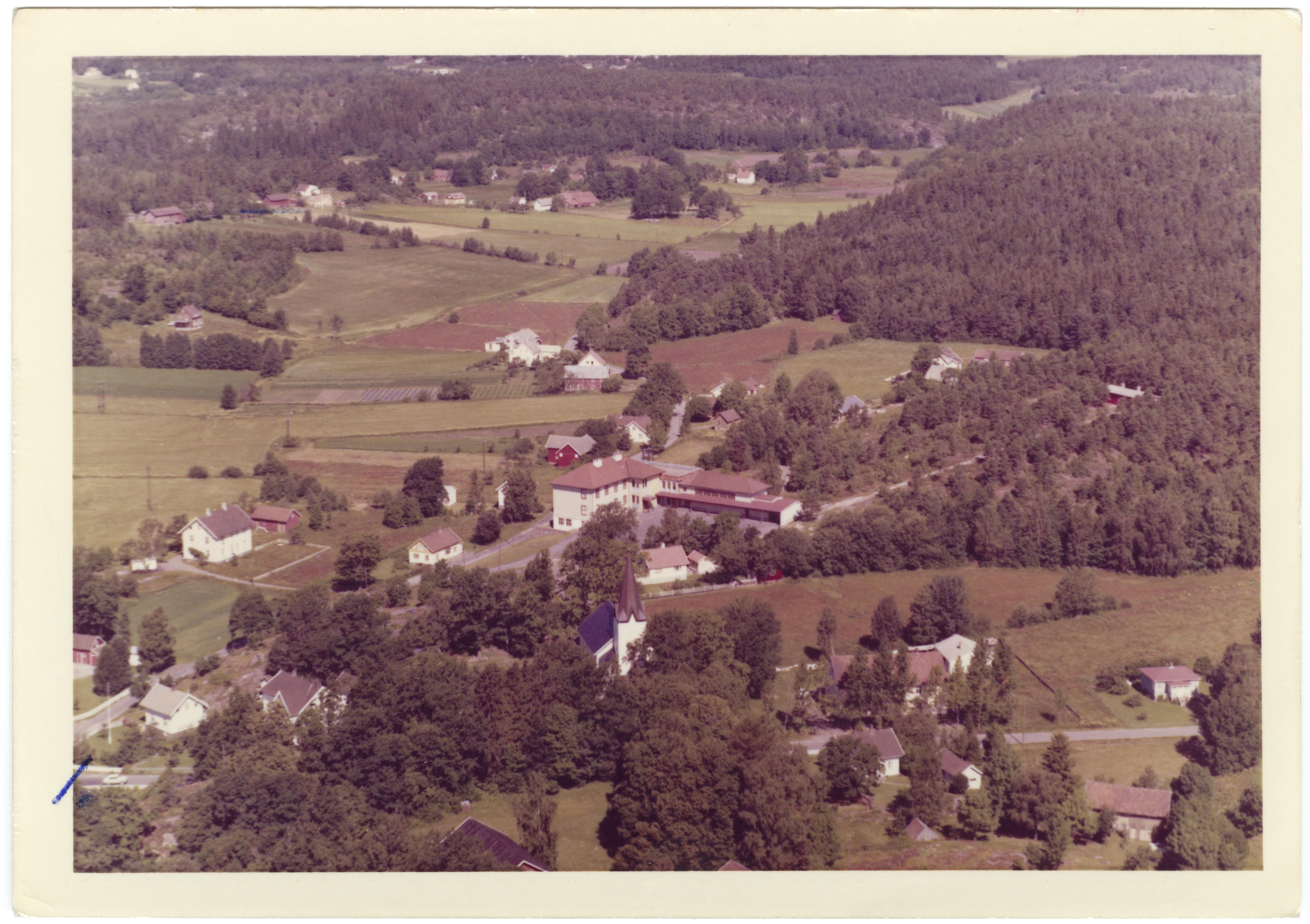
- Aerial view of the village
- Interactive map of Torød
- Coordinates: 59.18028°N 10.44045°E
- Country: Norway
- Region: Eastern Norway
- County: Vestfold
- Municipality: Færder Municipality
- Elevation: 28 m (92 ft)
- Time zone: UTC+01:00 (CET)
  - Summer (DST): UTC+02:00 (CEST)
- Post Code: 3135 Torød

Torød is a village in Færder Municipality in Vestfold county, Norway. The village is located near the southern coast of the island of Nøtterøy. The village lies about 2 kilometres (1.2 mi) to the northeast of the village of Buerstad, about 1.5 kilometres (0.93 mi) to the southwest of the village of Årøysund, and about 2 kilometres (1.2 mi) to the south of the village of Oterbekk.

The village of Torød and the surrounding countryside has a population (in 2026) of 735. The village is the site of the Torød Church which serves the southern part of the island.
