= Årøysund =

Village in Færder Municipality, Norway

Årøysund Aarøysund (historic name)
- Village
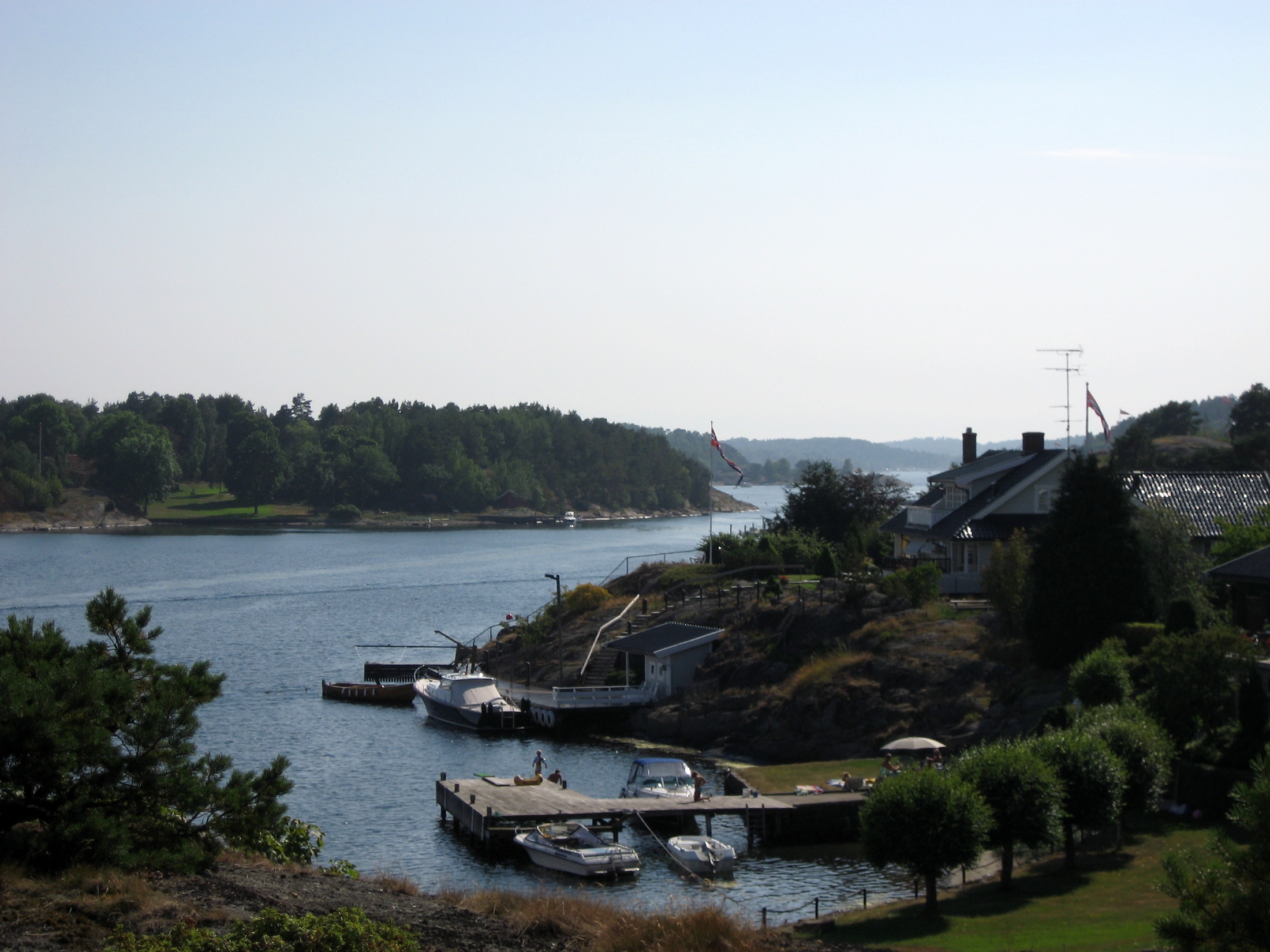
- View of the village
- Interactive map of Årøysund
- Coordinates: 59.18321°N 10.45743°E
- Country: Norway
- Region: Eastern Norway
- County: Vestfold
- Municipality: Færder Municipality

Area
  - Total: 1.29 km^{2} (0.50 sq mi)
- Elevation: 8 m (26 ft)

Population (2026)
  - Total: 1,582
  - Density: 1,226/km^{2} (3,180/sq mi)
- Time zone: UTC+01:00 (CET)
  - Summer (DST): UTC+02:00 (CEST)
- Post Code: 3135 Torød

Årøysund is a village in Færder Municipality in Vestfold county, Norway. The village is located on the southeastern coast of the island of Nøtterøy. The village lies about 1.5 kilometres (0.93 mi) to the northeast of the village of Torød and about 2 kilometres (1.2 mi) to the southeast of the village of Oterbekk.

The 1.29-square-kilometre (320-acre) village has a population (2026) of 1,582 and a population density of 1,226 inhabitants per square kilometre (3,180/sq mi).
