= Fokserød =

Village in Sandefjord Municipality, Norway

- Village
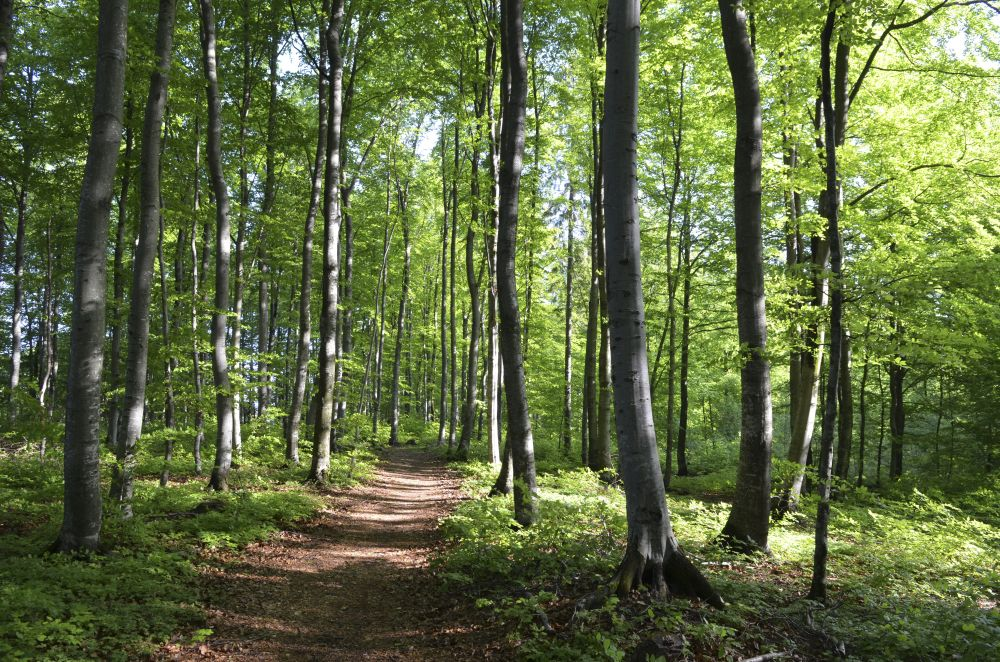
- View of the beech forest at Fokserød
- Interactive map of Fokserød
- Coordinates: 59.18214°N 10.20455°E
- Country: Norway
- Region: Eastern Norway
- County: Vestfold
- Municipality: Sandefjord Municipality
- Elevation: 103 m (338 ft)
- Time zone: UTC+01:00 (CET)
  - Summer (DST): UTC+02:00 (CEST)
- Post Code: 3241 Sandefjord

Fokserød is a village in Sandefjord Municipality in Vestfold county, Norway. The village is located along the European route E18 highway, just west of the Sandefjord Airport, Torp. The village lies about 5 kilometres (3.1 mi) to the north of the city of Sandefjord. Fokserød is located between the Haukerød borough to the south and the village of Fevang to the north. Due to its proximity to the city of Sandefjord, Fokserød is considered a part of the city of statistical purposes by Statistics Norway. The statistical area Fokserød, which also can include the peripheral parts of the village as well as the surrounding countryside, had a population of 1,288 in 2026.

== History ==
Fokserød was originally the name of three former farms located near the current Coop Obs! megastore, relatively near Sandefjord Airport Torp. Former written forms were Foxarôyru (1346), Faxerrudt (1575), Fuxáeröd (1625), and Foxeröed (1664).

== Nature ==
The Fokserød Nature Preserve, a preserved beech tree forest, is located in the village. In the 1960s, it was one of the first places in Norway where nesting Hawfinch were recorded. The nature preserve was established on 13 June 1980. The preserve occupies 38 decares (0.038 km^{2}; 0.015 sq mi) of land in the village. The nature preserve is divided in two by the road Torpveien that leads to Torp Airport and Kullerød.
