= Himberg (Swabian Jura) =

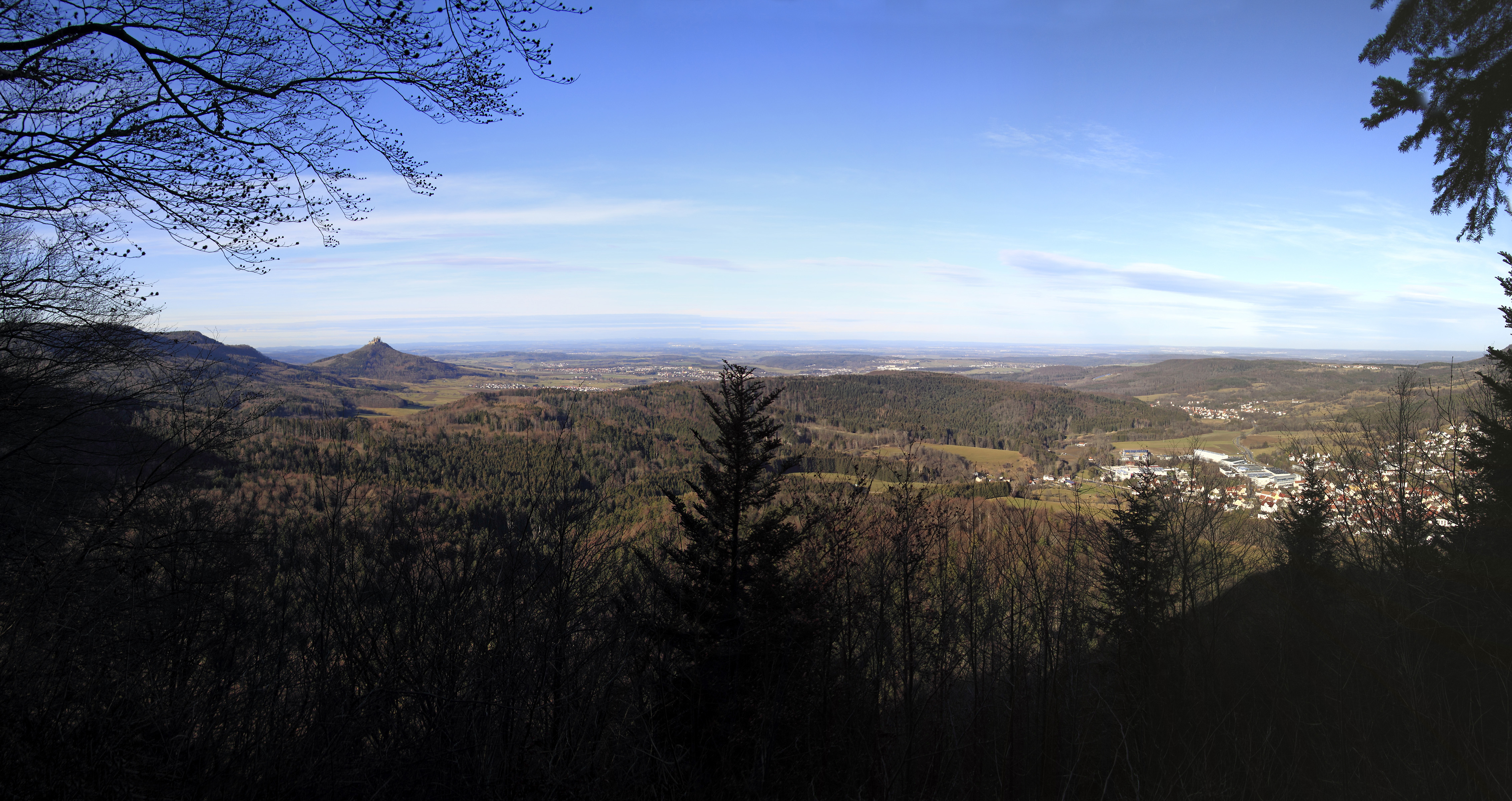
- view from Himberg with Hohenzollern castle

Highest point
- Elevation: 854 m (2,802 ft)
- Coordinates: 48°18′45″N 09°02′42″E

Geography
- Location within Baden-Württemberg
- Location: Zollernalbkreis, Baden-Württemberg, Germany

The Himberg is a mountain in Baden-Württemberg, Germany. It is located in the county of Zollernalbkreis.
