= Torød Church =

Church in Vestfold, Norway

- Torød kirke
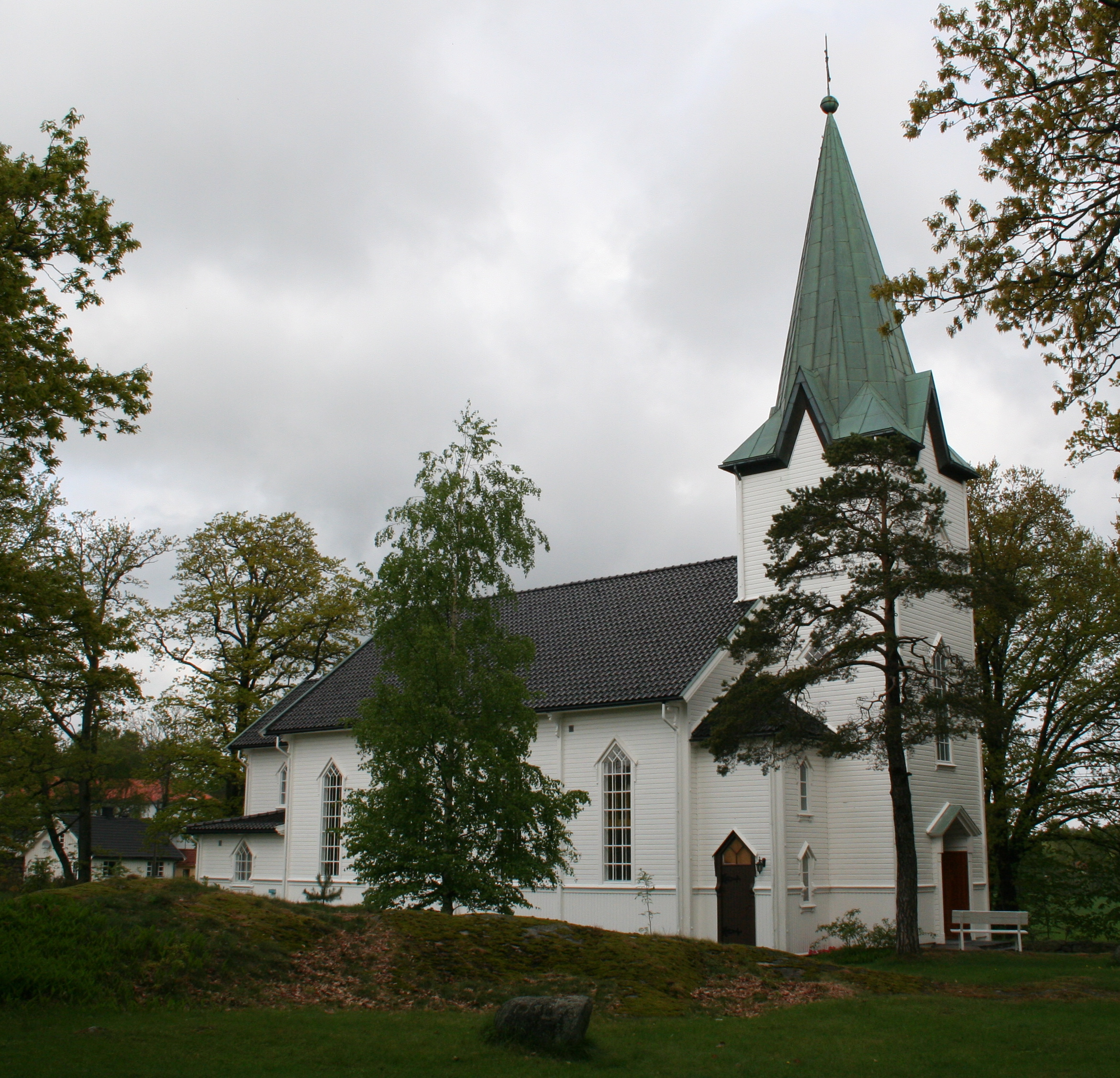
- View of the church
- Torød Church
- 59°10′52″N 10°26′29″E
- Location: Færder Municipality, Vestfold
- Country: Norway
- Denomination: Church of Norway
- Churchmanship: Evangelical Lutheran

History
- Status: Parish church
- Founded: 1915
- Consecrated: 1915

Architecture
- Functional status: Active
- Architect: Ludvig Karlsen
- Architectural type: Long church
- Completed: 1915 (111 years ago)

Specifications
- Capacity: 200
- Materials: Wood

Administration
- Diocese: Tunsberg
- Deanery: Tønsberg domprosti
- Parish: Torød
- Norwegian Cultural Heritage Site
- Type: Church
- Status: Not protected
- ID: 85656

Torød Church (Norwegian: Torød kirke) is a parish church of the Church of Norway in Færder Municipality in Vestfold county, Norway. It is located in the village of Torød on the southern part of the island of Nøtterøy. It is the church for the Torød parish which is part of the Tønsberg domprosti (deanery) in the Diocese of Tunsberg. The white, wooden church was built in a long church design in 1915 using plans drawn up by Ludvig Karlsen from Kragerø. The church seats about 200 people.

== History ==
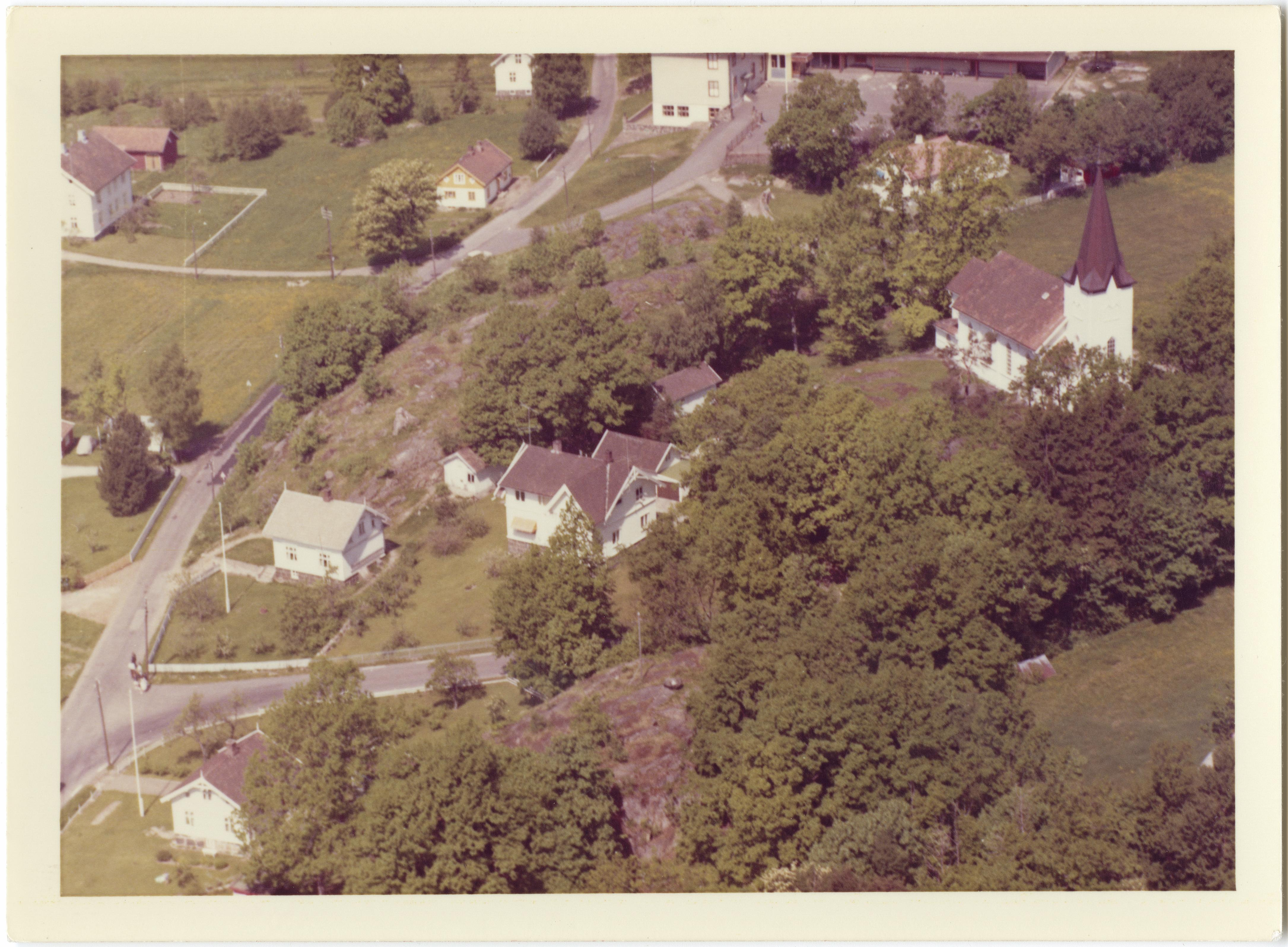
Aerial view of the church

Talk of building a chapel in Torød first started as early as the 1880s, but it wasn't until 1904 that planning for the new building began in earnest. In 1907, land was purchased. In 1910, the builder Ludvig Karlsen from Kragerø was hired to make architectural drawings. After some fundraising, the chapel was built in 1914–1915. The foundation wall was built by the bricklayer J. Gulberg from Tjøme and the builder for the actual church building was Y.A. Bodin from Tønsberg. The new building had a rectangular nave and rectangular choir surrounded by vestries. Torød Chapel (its original name) was consecrated on 11 May 1915 by Bishop Jens Frølich Tandberg. Later, the chapel was upgraded to parish church status and was renamed Torød Church.

== See also ==
- List of churches in Tunsberg
