= Fevang =

Village in Sandefjord Municipality, Norway

- Village
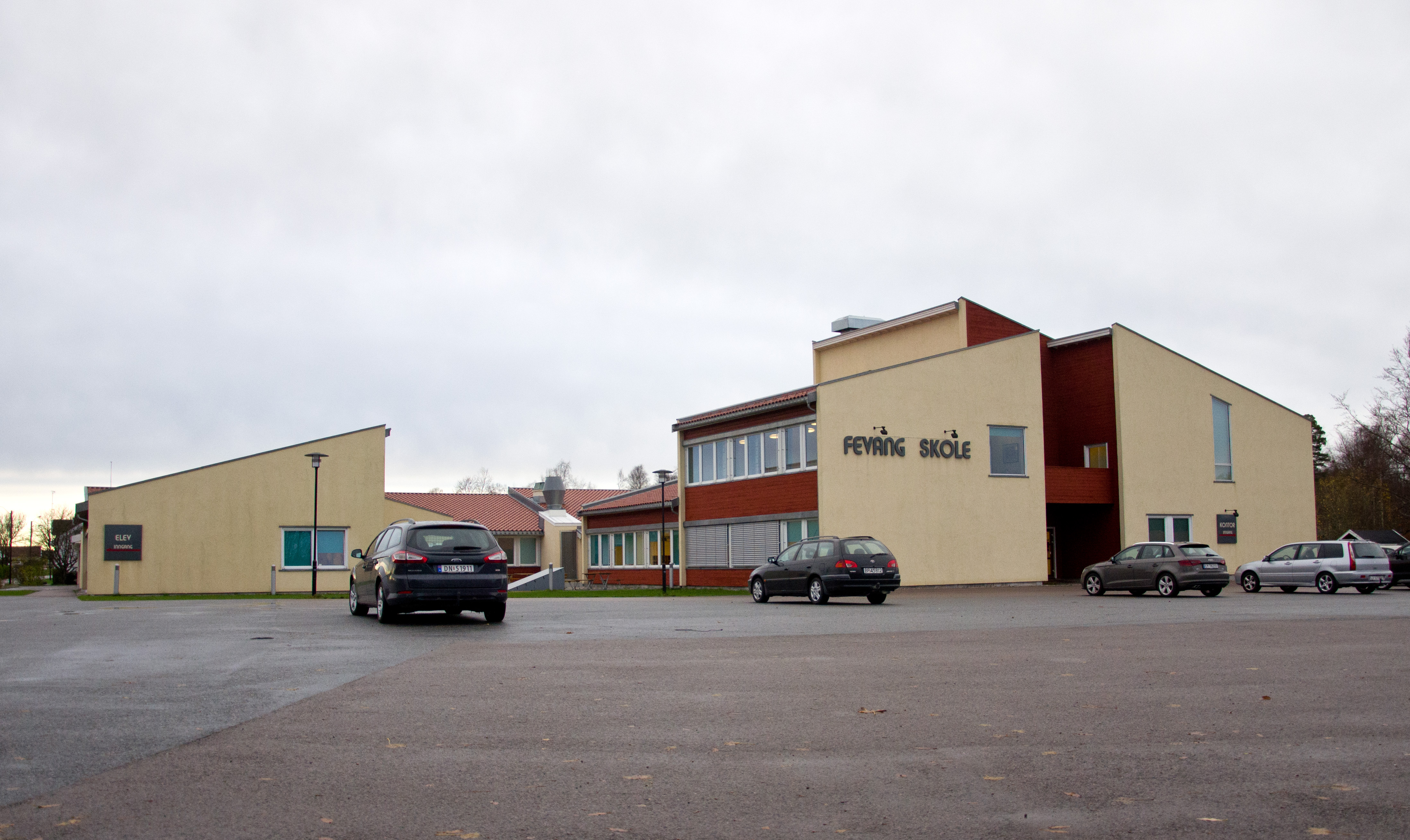
- View of the Fevang school
- Interactive map of Fevang
- Coordinates: 59.19241°N 10.22668°E
- Country: Norway
- Region: Eastern Norway
- County: Vestfold
- Municipality: Sandefjord Municipality
- Elevation: 106 m (348 ft)
- Time zone: UTC+01:00 (CET)
  - Summer (DST): UTC+02:00 (CEST)
- Post Code: 3239 Sandefjord

Fevang is a village in Sandefjord Municipality in Vestfold county, Norway. The village is located about 7 kilometres (4.3 mi) to the north of the centre of the city of Sandefjord and about 5 kilometres (3.1 mi) to the southwest of the village of Stokke. It is located along the European route E18 highway, just west of the Sandefjord Airport, Torp.

The village of Fevang is located between the village of Fokserød in the south and the village of Rørkoll in the north. Due to its proximity to the city of Sandefjord, Fevang is considered to be the northernmost part of the city's metropolitan area. The statistical area of Fevang, which also can include the peripheral parts of the village as well as the surrounding countryside, had a population of 400 in 2026.
