= Melsomvik =

Village in Sandefjord Municipality, Norway

- Village
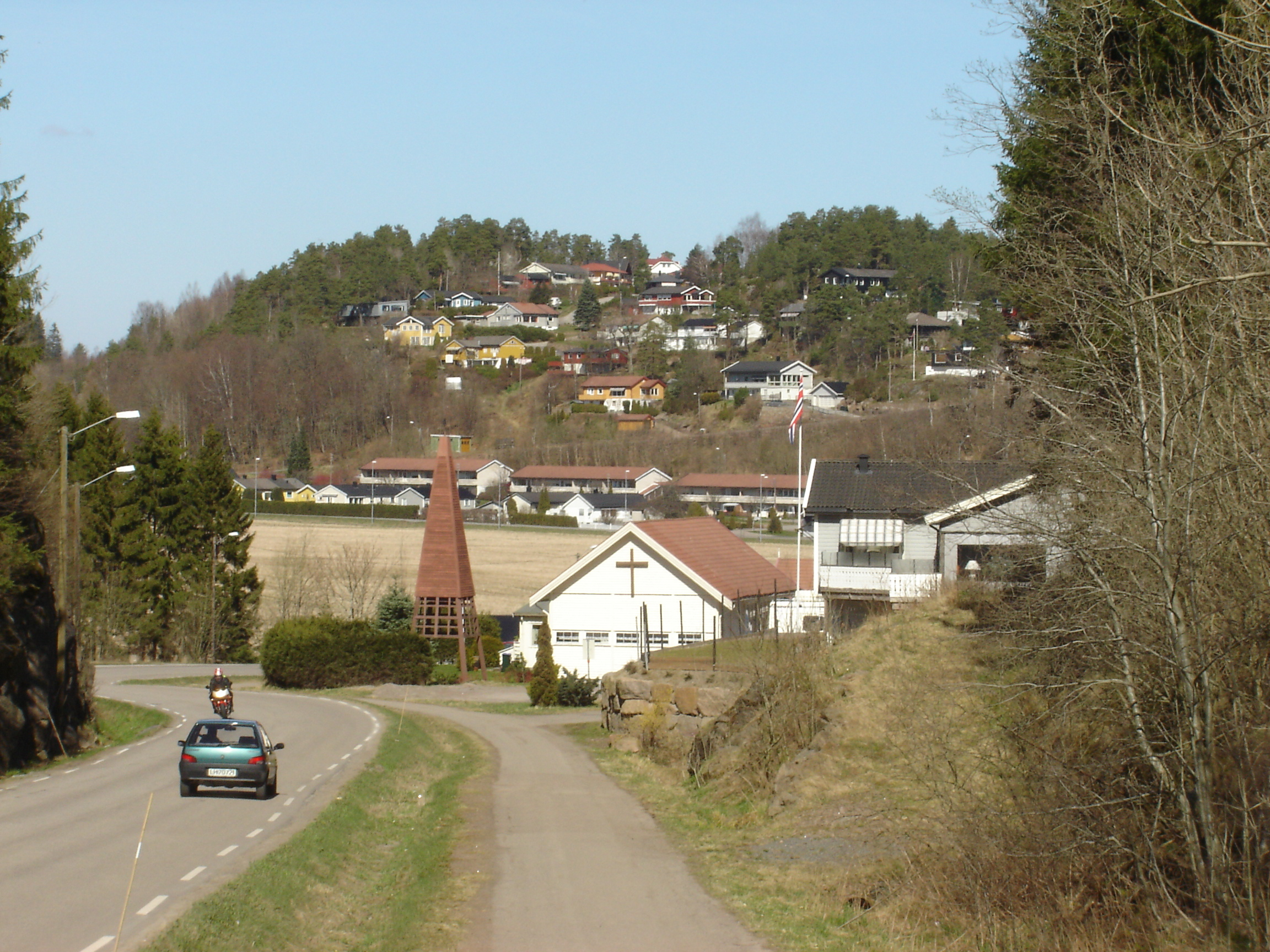
- View of the village
- Interactive map of Melsomvik
- Coordinates: 59.22394°N 10.33616°E
- Country: Norway
- Region: Eastern Norway
- County: Vestfold
- Municipality: Sandefjord Municipality

Area
  - Total: 1.39 km^{2} (0.54 sq mi)
- Elevation: 5 m (16 ft)

Population (2026)
  - Total: 2,117
  - Density: 1,523/km^{2} (3,940/sq mi)
- Time zone: UTC+01:00 (CET)
  - Summer (DST): UTC+02:00 (CEST)
- Post Code: 3159 Melsomvik

Melsomvik is a village in Sandefjord Municipality in Vestfold county, Norway. The village is located along the Tønsbergfjorden, about 2.5 kilometres (1.6 mi) to the east of the village of Stokke. The small village of Storevar lies immediately to the south of Melsomvik.

The 1.39-square-kilometre (340-acre) village has a population (2026) of 2,117 and a population density of 1,523 inhabitants per square kilometre (3,940/sq mi). Since 2015, the neighboring village of Storevar has been considered part of the urban area of Melsomvik.

Melsomvik is known for its architecture which resembles that of Southern Norway. It has been an active harbor since the Middle Ages. The Norwegian Armed Forces maintained in control of its harbor until 1964. A coastal hiking trail can be found along the coast from Brunstad to Storevar. Melsomvik experiences significant summer tourism and is home to many vacation homes.

== History ==
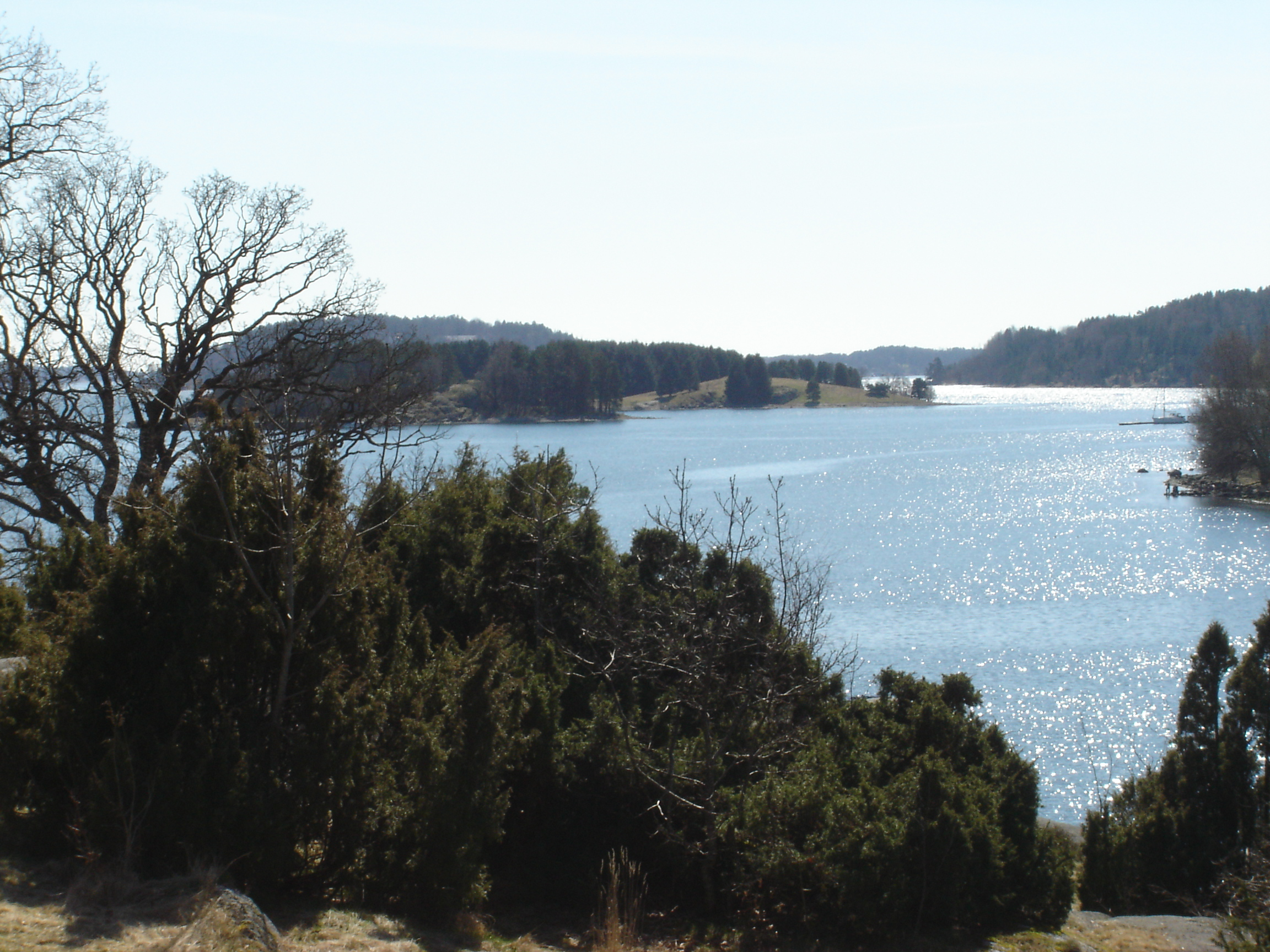
The fjord in Melsomvik.

Melsomvik has been a boat harbor since medieval times when the Leidang fleet was located in Melsomvik. Historically, when the conflict with Sweden escalated and fears of war were imminent, the Royal Norwegian Navy was relocated from Horten to Melsomvik as Melsomvik was a better-protected location. Melsomvik remained an important harbour for the Norwegian Armed Forces until the 1960s. The Norwegian Navy controlled the harbour and based many of its ships in this harbour during the period from 1898 until 1964 when it relinquished control of the harbour. Whale-catchers were also harbored in Melsomvik.

An agricultural school was established at Melsom on 30 April 1957, known as Vestfold Landbruksskole. This school changed names to Melsom Secondary School in 1994. Melsomvik is also home to Oslofjord Convention Center, formerly known as Brunstad Conference Center, which was established in 2003. It is owned and operated by Brunstad Christian Church ("Smith’s Friends") and has a capacity of 9,000 guests in its 2,400 rooms. The large convention center has also been home to Arctic Equestrian Games, the largest horse show in Norway. It has an overnight capacity of 800 and is also the home of a separate campground. Brunstad in northern Melsomvik is also home to a municipal beach, and various convenience stores and a seafood restaurant are open during summers near the beach at Brunstad.

Melsomvik was previously a part of Stokke Municipality, but on 1 January 2017 all of Stokke Municipality was merged into Sandefjord Municipality. Remains from German fortifications can be seen along the coast, and burial mounds dated to the Iron Age can be found at Trælsodden.

== Sundås Fort ==
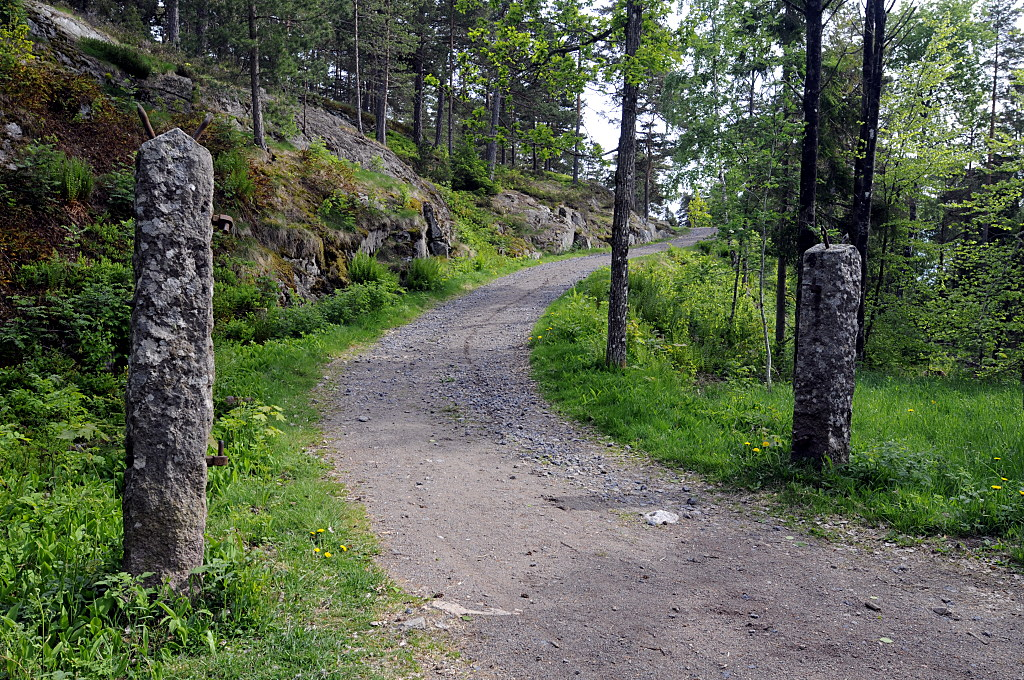
Hiking trail to Sundås Fort.

A defunct fort can be seen at the 87-metre (285 ft) tall hill Sundåsen, south of Melsomvik. The fort lies by Bogen and offers panoramic surrounding views of the Swedish coastline to the southeast and the Skrim mountains in the west. Forts were constructed at both Sundåsen and Håøya, meant to protect the former marine harbor found in Melsomvik. Melsomvik became a marine harbor in the late 1800s and was home to modern fortifications equipped with canons for protection. The fort at Sundåsen was constructed during turbulent times with Sweden, during the Union between Sweden and Norway, and the fort was erected to prevent a potential Swedish invasion. Most of the fort at Sundåsen has been removed, but remains can still be seen, including three concrete gun pits overlooking the Tønsbergfjorden.

== Recreation ==
Melsomvik is located along the coastline and it has varied landscape. Much of the area's coastal trails can be found near Melsomvik and are parts of the international North Sea Trail, a network of 5,000 kilometres (3,100 mi) of international hiking trails surrounding the North Sea. In the inner parts of Melsomvik Bay is a wildlife refuge. This 39-hectare (96-acre) reserve was established in 2006 and is home to a variety of oak and broad-leaved tree species along with vulnerable wildlife species.

Grave mounds dating to the Iron Age can be seen at Trælsodden. At this time, the ocean levels were 4–5 metres (13–16 ft) higher and the mounds were situated closer to the sea. At Trælsodden, remains from battlements and trenches may also be found, constructed by the Germans during World War II.

== Climate ==
Climate data for Melsom 1991-2020 (26 m, avg high/low 2003–2025)
| Month | Jan | Feb | Mar | Apr | May | Jun | Jul | Aug | Sep | Oct | Nov | Dec | Year |
|---|---|---|---|---|---|---|---|---|---|---|---|---|---|
| Mean daily maximum °C (°F) | 1.1 (34.0) | 2.0 (35.6) | 6.1 (43.0) | 11.3 (52.3) | 16.4 (61.5) | 20.4 (68.7) | 22.3 (72.1) | 21 (70) | 17.1 (62.8) | 11 (52) | 6 (43) | 2.4 (36.3) | 11.4 (52.6) |
| Daily mean °C (°F) | −1.6 (29.1) | −1.5 (29.3) | 1.4 (34.5) | 5.9 (42.6) | 11.1 (52.0) | 14.9 (58.8) | 17.1 (62.8) | 16.1 (61.0) | 12.1 (53.8) | 7.0 (44.6) | 2.9 (37.2) | −0.8 (30.6) | 7.1 (44.7) |
| Mean daily minimum °C (°F) | −4.5 (23.9) | −4.2 (24.4) | −2 (28) | 1.9 (35.4) | 6.6 (43.9) | 10.7 (51.3) | 12.9 (55.2) | 12.0 (53.6) | 9.1 (48.4) | 4.5 (40.1) | 0.8 (33.4) | −3.1 (26.4) | 3.7 (38.7) |
| Average precipitation mm (inches) | 93 (3.7) | 66 (2.6) | 65 (2.6) | 61 (2.4) | 72 (2.8) | 81 (3.2) | 75 (3.0) | 108 (4.3) | 114 (4.5) | 136 (5.4) | 125 (4.9) | 101 (4.0) | 1,097 (43.2) |
Source: yr.no (mean, precipitation)
