= Verningen =

Village in Larvik, Norway

- Village
- Interactive map of Verningen
- Coordinates: 59.09212°N 10.10208°E
- Country: Norway
- Region: Eastern Norway
- County: Vestfold
- District: Vestfold
- Municipality: Larvik Municipality

Area
  - Total: 0.91 km^{2} (0.35 sq mi)
- Elevation: 77 m (253 ft)

Population (2022)
  - Total: 1,003
  - Density: 1,098/km^{2} (2,840/sq mi)
- Time zone: UTC+01:00 (CET)
  - Summer (DST): UTC+02:00 (CEST)
- Post Code: 3270 Larvik

Verningen is a village in Larvik Municipality in Vestfold county, Norway. The village is located along the European route E18 highway, about 6 kilometres (3.7 mi) to the northeast of the town of Larvik. The village of Himberg (an exclave of Sandefjord Municipality) lies just northeast of Verningen.

The 1.43-square-kilometre (350-acre) village had a population (2024) of 1,353 and a population density of 946 inhabitants per square kilometre (2,450/sq mi). Since 2024, the population and area data for this village area has not been separately tracked by Statistics Norway because it has been considered part of the urban area of the town of Larvik. It is primarily a residential village, but there is some industry in the north, along the highway.
