= Råstad =

Village in Sandefjord, Norway

- Village
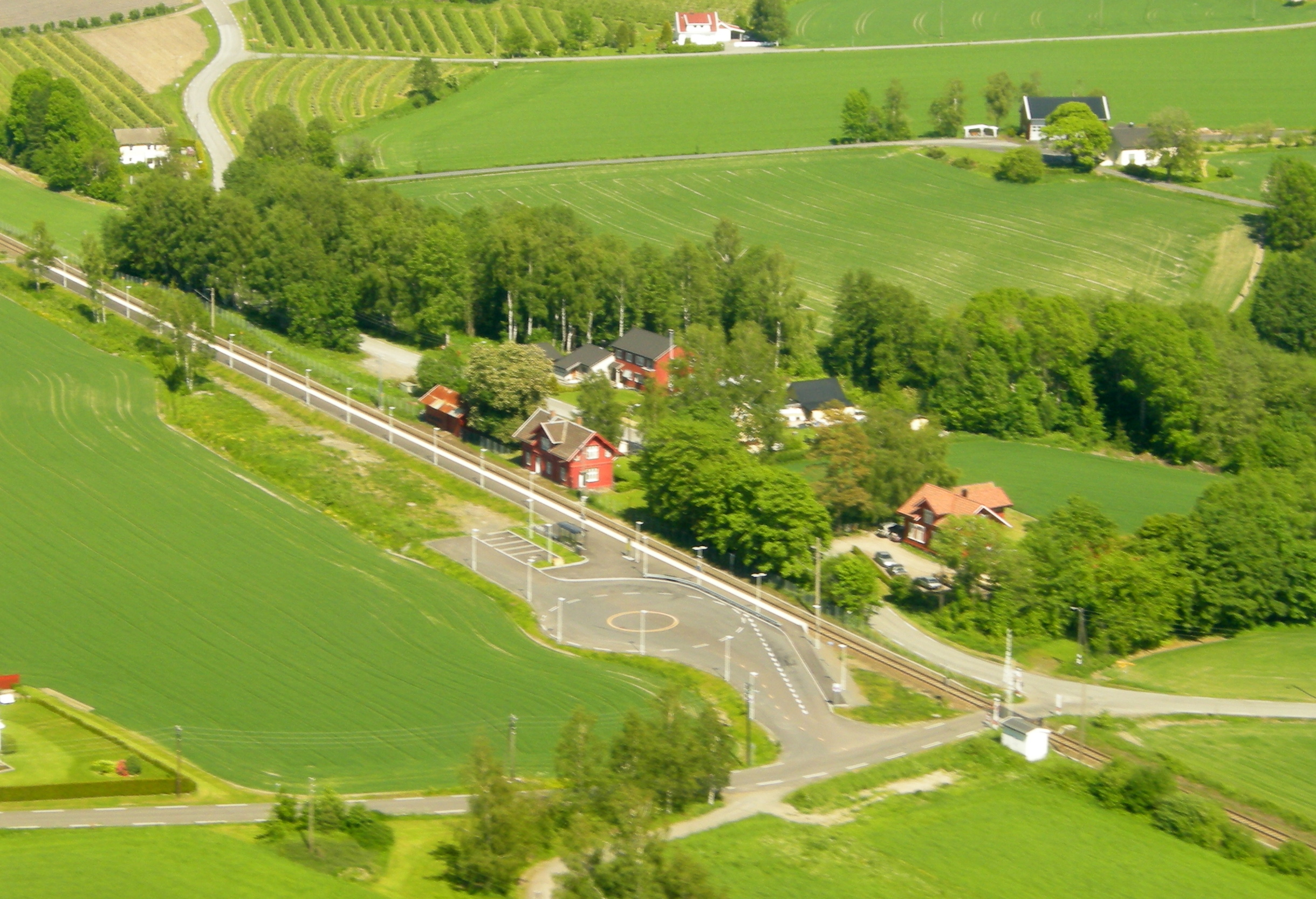
- View of the village
- Interactive map of Råstad
- Coordinates: 59.14019°N 10.24436°E
- Country: Norway
- Region: Eastern Norway
- County: Vestfold
- Municipality: Sandefjord Municipality
- Elevation: 14 m (46 ft)
- Time zone: UTC+01:00 (CET)
  - Summer (DST): UTC+02:00 (CEST)
- Post Code: 3239 Sandefjord

Råstad is a village area in Sandefjord Municipality in Vestfold county, Norway. The village is located just south of Sandefjord Airport, Torp, about 8 kilometres (5.0 mi) south of the village of Stokke, and about 5 kilometres (3.1 mi) northeast of the city of Sandefjord. It is home to Råstad Station which dates to 1885. The railway station has been known as Torp Station since 2008, and is the main railway station for Sandefjord Airport Torp.

Råstad is located between the village of Unneberg to the south and Sandefjord Airport, Torp to the north. Råstad is considered to be one of the outer neighborhoods in the northeastern part of the city of Sandefjord which has an area of 26.14 square kilometres (10.09 sq mi) and a population (in 2026) of 49,186. The statistical area Råstad, which also can include the peripheral parts of the village as well as the surrounding countryside, has a population of 189.

== History ==
The farm name Råstad derives from Roaldsstaðir, from the male name Roald and staðir (place), translating to "the farm which belongs to Roald." Former written forms of the name have been Roaldstadum (in 1322), Roaldstad (1498), Raastad (1539), and Rolstadt (1575). It was first mentioned in a letter dated to 1322. Only six out of a total of eight Råstad farms are still left today.
