= Oterbekk =

Village in Færder Municipality, Norway

- Village
- Interactive map of Oterbekk
- Coordinates: 59.19463°N 10.44898°E
- Country: Norway
- Region: Eastern Norway
- County: Vestfold
- Municipality: Færder Municipality
- Elevation: 11 m (36 ft)
- Time zone: UTC+01:00 (CET)
  - Summer (DST): UTC+02:00 (CEST)
- Post Code: 3138 Skallestad

Oterbekk is a village in Færder Municipality in Vestfold county, Norway. The village is located on the southeastern coast of the island of Nøtterøy. The village is located about 2 kilometres (1.2 mi) to the northwest of the village of Årøysund, about 1.5 kilometres (0.93 mi) to the north of the village of Torød, and about 1 kilometre (0.62 mi) to the southeast of the village of Hårkollen.

The village of Oterbekk and the surrounding countryside has a population (in 2026) of 719. It is considered to be part of the urban city of Tønsberg metropolitan area which includes the central city area plus the northern and eastern parts of the island of Nøtterøy.
