= Kjøpmannskjær =

Village in Færder Municipality, Norway

- Village
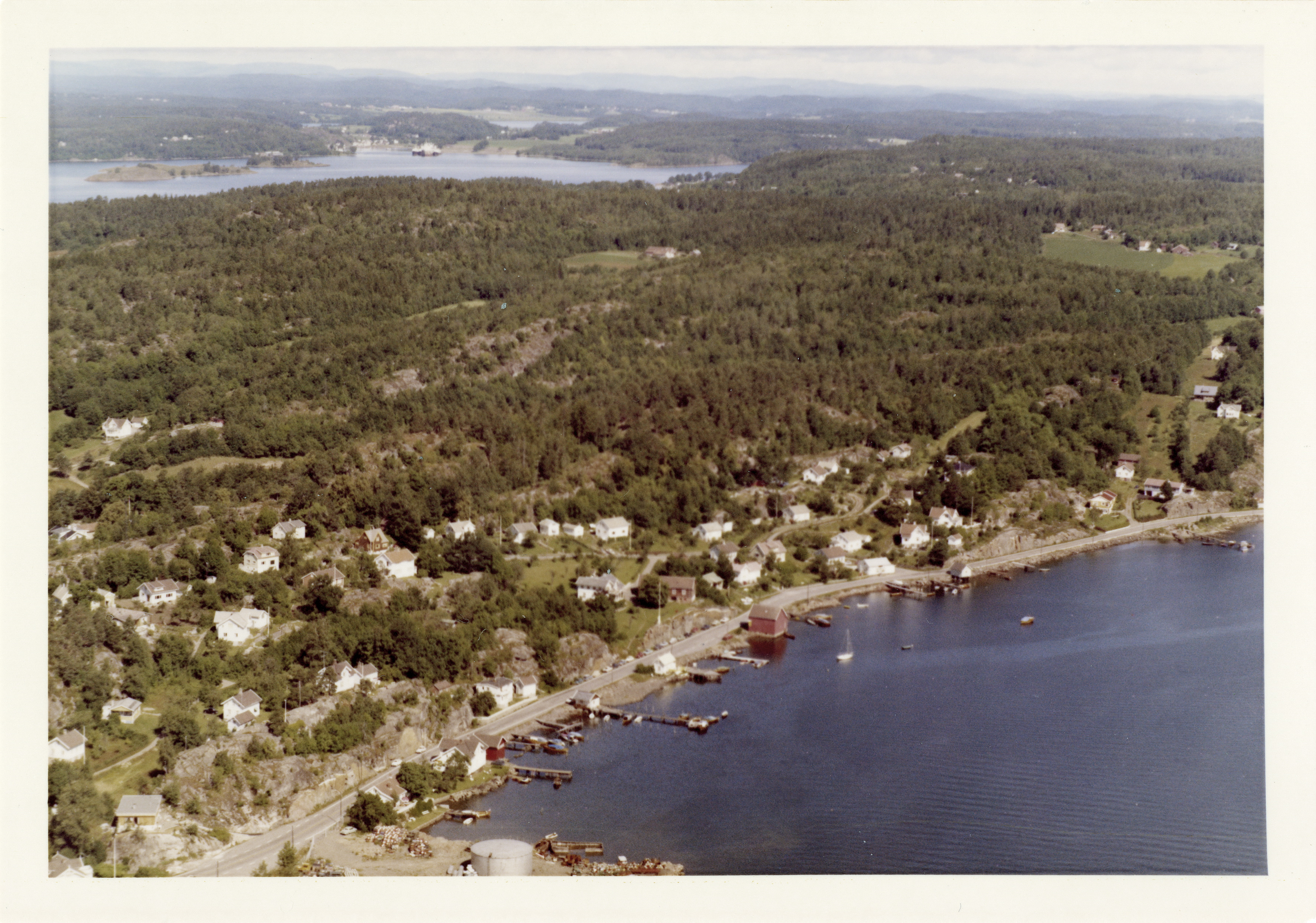
- View of the village
- Interactive map of Kjøpmannskjær
- Coordinates: 59.17287°N 10.3833°E
- Country: Norway
- Region: Eastern Norway
- County: Vestfold
- Municipality: Færder Municipality

Area
  - Total: 0.46 km^{2} (0.18 sq mi)
- Elevation: 2 m (6.6 ft)

Population (2026)
  - Total: 437
  - Density: 950/km^{2} (2,500/sq mi)
- Time zone: UTC+01:00 (CET)
  - Summer (DST): UTC+02:00 (CEST)
- Post Code: 3143 Kjøpmannskjær

Kjøpmannskjær is a village in Færder Municipality in Vestfold county, Norway. The village is located on the southern shore of the island of Nøtterøy, about 1 kilometre (0.62 mi) east of the village of Tenvik, about 1 kilometre (0.62 mi) north of the village of Sundene (on Tjøme island), and about 3.5 kilometres (2.2 mi) south of the village of Skjerve. The village of Strengsdal lies about 2 kilometres (1.2 mi) to the east along the southern shore of the island.

The 0.46-square-kilometre (110-acre) village has a population (2026) of 437 and a population density of 950 inhabitants per square kilometre (2,500/sq mi).
