= Hårkollen =

Village in Færder Municipality, Norway

Hårkollen Haarkollen (historic name)
- Village
- Interactive map of Hårkollen
- Coordinates: 59.19983°N 10.44121°E
- Country: Norway
- Region: Eastern Norway
- County: Vestfold
- Municipality: Færder Municipality
- Elevation: 24 m (79 ft)
- Time zone: UTC+01:00 (CET)
  - Summer (DST): UTC+02:00 (CEST)
- Post Code: 3138 Skallestad

Hårkollen is a village in Færder Municipality in Vestfold county, Norway. The village is located on the southeastern coast of the island of Nøtterøy. The village lies about 1 kilometre (0.62 mi) to the northwest of the village of Oterbekk, about 2 kilometres (1.2 mi) to the south of the village of Duken, and about 2.5 kilometres (1.6 mi) to the southeast of the village of Vollen.

The village of Hårkollen and the surrounding countryside has a population (in 2026) of 980. It is considered to be part of the urban city of Tønsberg metropolitan area which includes the central city area plus the northern and eastern parts of the island of Nøtterøy.
