= Nesbrygga =

Village in Færder Municipality, Norway

Nesbrygga Nesbryggen
- Village
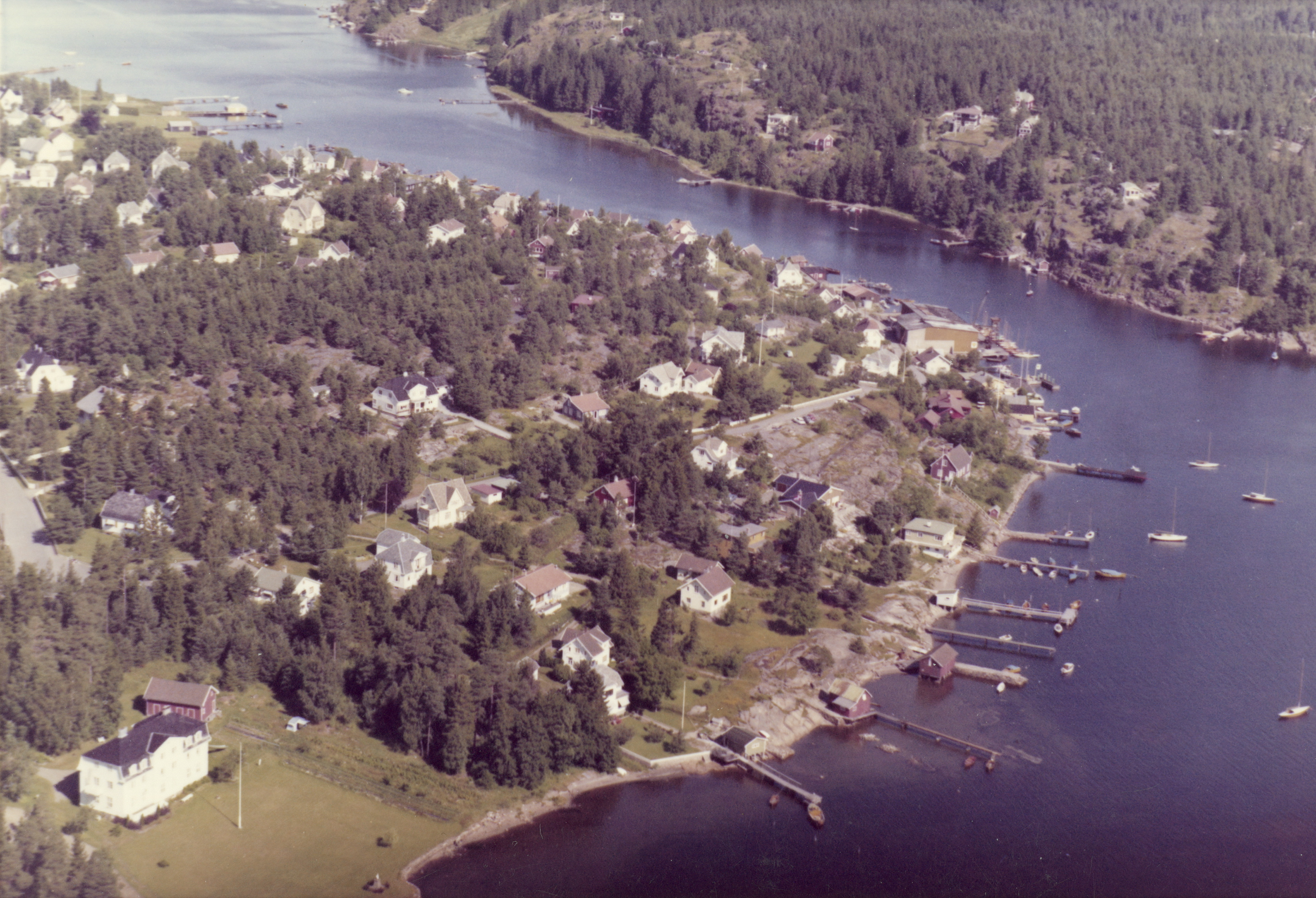
- View of the village area
- Interactive map of Nesbrygga
- Coordinates: 59.22018°N 10.45361°E
- Country: Norway
- Region: Eastern Norway
- County: Vestfold
- Municipality: Færder Municipality
- Elevation: 16 m (52 ft)
- Time zone: UTC+01:00 (CET)
  - Summer (DST): UTC+02:00 (CEST)
- Post Code: 3133 Duken

Nesbrygga or Nesbryggen is a village in Færder Municipality in Vestfold county, Norway. The village is located on the eastern coast of the island of Nøtterøy. The village lies about 1 kilometre (0.62 mi) to the north of the village of Duken, about 2.5 kilometres (1.6 mi) to the east of the village of Borgheim, and just across the narrow strait to the island of Føynland.

The village of Nesbrygga and the surrounding countryside has a population (in 2026) of 1,025. It is considered to be part of the urban city of Tønsberg metropolitan area which includes the central city area plus the northern and eastern parts of the island of Nøtterøy.
