= Solløkka =

Village in Sandefjord, Norway

- Village
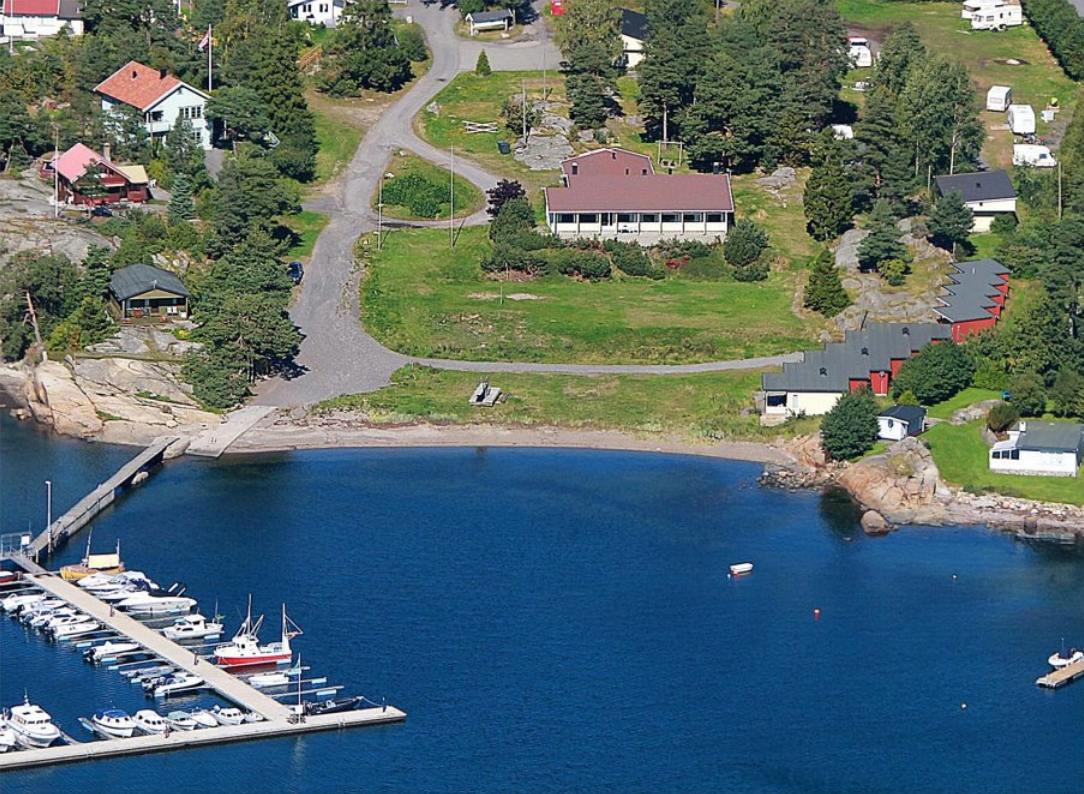
- View of the village
- Interactive map of Solløkka
- Coordinates: 59.13977°N 10.29683°E
- Country: Norway
- Region: Eastern Norway
- County: Vestfold
- Municipality: Sandefjord Municipality
- Elevation: 20 m (66 ft)
- Time zone: UTC+01:00 (CET)
  - Summer (DST): UTC+02:00 (CEST)
- Post Code: 3233 Sandefjord

Solløkka is a village in Sandefjord Municipality in Vestfold county, Norway. The village is located at the north end of the Lahellefjorden, just across the fjord from the village of Lahelle. The village sits about 1 kilometre (0.62 mi) to the southeast of the village of Helgerød and about 5 kilometres (3.1 mi) east of the city of Sandefjord.

Solløkka is considered to be one of the outer neighborhoods in the eastern part of the city of Sandefjord which has an area of 26.14 square kilometres (10.09 sq mi) and a population (in 2026) of 49,186. The statistical area Solløkka, which also can include the peripheral parts of the village as well as the surrounding countryside, has a population of 314.

Solløkka has a boat harbor and a 70-metre (230 ft) long sandy beach area plus it also has a number of cabins and vacation homes and a campground (Solløkka camping og leirsted).
