= Himberg, Norway =

Village in Sandefjord Municipality, Norway

Himberg
- Village
- Interactive map of Himberg
- Coordinates: 59.1028°N 10.13988°E
- Country: Norway
- Region: Eastern Norway
- County: Vestfold
- Municipality: Sandefjord Municipality
- Elevation: 43 m (141 ft)
- Time zone: UTC+01:00 (CET)
  - Summer (DST): UTC+02:00 (CEST)
- Post Code: 3232 Sandefjord

Himberg is an exclave village that is part of Sandefjord Municipality in Vestfold county, Norway. The rural agricultural village is located entirely within Larvik Municipality (historically it was within Tjølling Municipality until 1988). It sits a little less than 1 kilometre (0.62 mi) west of the border with the rest of Sandefjord Municipality, thus making it an exclave. It is located about 6 kilometres (3.7 mi) to the southwest of the city of Sandefjord and about 1 kilometre (0.62 mi) east of the village of Verningen (in Larvik Municipality). The European route E18 highway runs just north of the village.

== Exclave ==
Himberg is a rural agricultural community which consists of about ten households. It has a population of about 33 as of 2026, and has a total area of 1.4 square kilometres (0.54 sq mi). There are only four similar type exclaves in Norway, and Himberg is the most populous of Norway's exclaves.

There have been numerous efforts to fix the borders over the years. Several efforts to merge Himberg into Larvik Municipality have failed. The Schei Committee in 1960 tried to trade the nearby Vannøya area which belonged to Tjølling Municipality for Himberg, but the attempt proved unsuccessful due to local opposition. A new annexation attempt took place in 1995, but was ultimately canceled due to opposition from "patriotic" Sandefjord residents in Himberg.
