= Lahelle =

Village in Sandefjord Municipality, Norway

- Village
- Interactive map of Lahelle
- Coordinates: 59.1345°N 10.28339°E
- Country: Norway
- Region: Eastern Norway
- County: Vestfold
- Municipality: Sandefjord Municipality
- Elevation: 2 m (6.6 ft)
- Time zone: UTC+01:00 (CET)
  - Summer (DST): UTC+02:00 (CEST)
- Post Code: 3218 Sandefjord

Lahelle is a village in Sandefjord Municipality in Vestfold county, Norway. The village is located at the innermost part of the 5-kilometre (3.1 mi) long Lahellefjorden. It is also located at the northern end of the Østerøya peninsula. The village is about 4 kilometres (2.5 mi) to the east of the centre of the city of Sandefjord, about 1 kilometre (0.62 mi) southwest of the village of Solløkka, about 2 kilometres (1.2 mi) south of the village of Helgerød, and about 2 kilometres (1.2 mi) east of the village of Gokstad.

Lahelle is considered to be one of the outer neighborhoods in the eastern part of the city of Sandefjord which has an area of 26.14 square kilometres (10.09 sq mi) and a population (in 2026) of 49,186. The statistical area of Lahelle, which also can include the peripheral parts of the village as well as the surrounding countryside, has a population of 260.

The oldest remaining house at Lahelle is dated to 1853. The area is now made up of a mixture of homes and vacation homes. There are several piers here along with sandy beaches.

== History ==
The village name was formerly spelled Ladhella, which includes the word lada, translating to loading or unloading vessels. The last section, -hella, most likely referred to the flat mountains. Lahelle first gained importance in the 1800s when shipyards were established at Lahelle. The shipyard was utilized primarily for repair and construction of sailing ships. For a limited time, it also became a regular port of call for steamships. Lahelle is also where the Gokstad Ship was moved onto barges in 1880 and transported to Kristiania.
