= Nøtterøy (island) =

Island in Vestfold, Norway

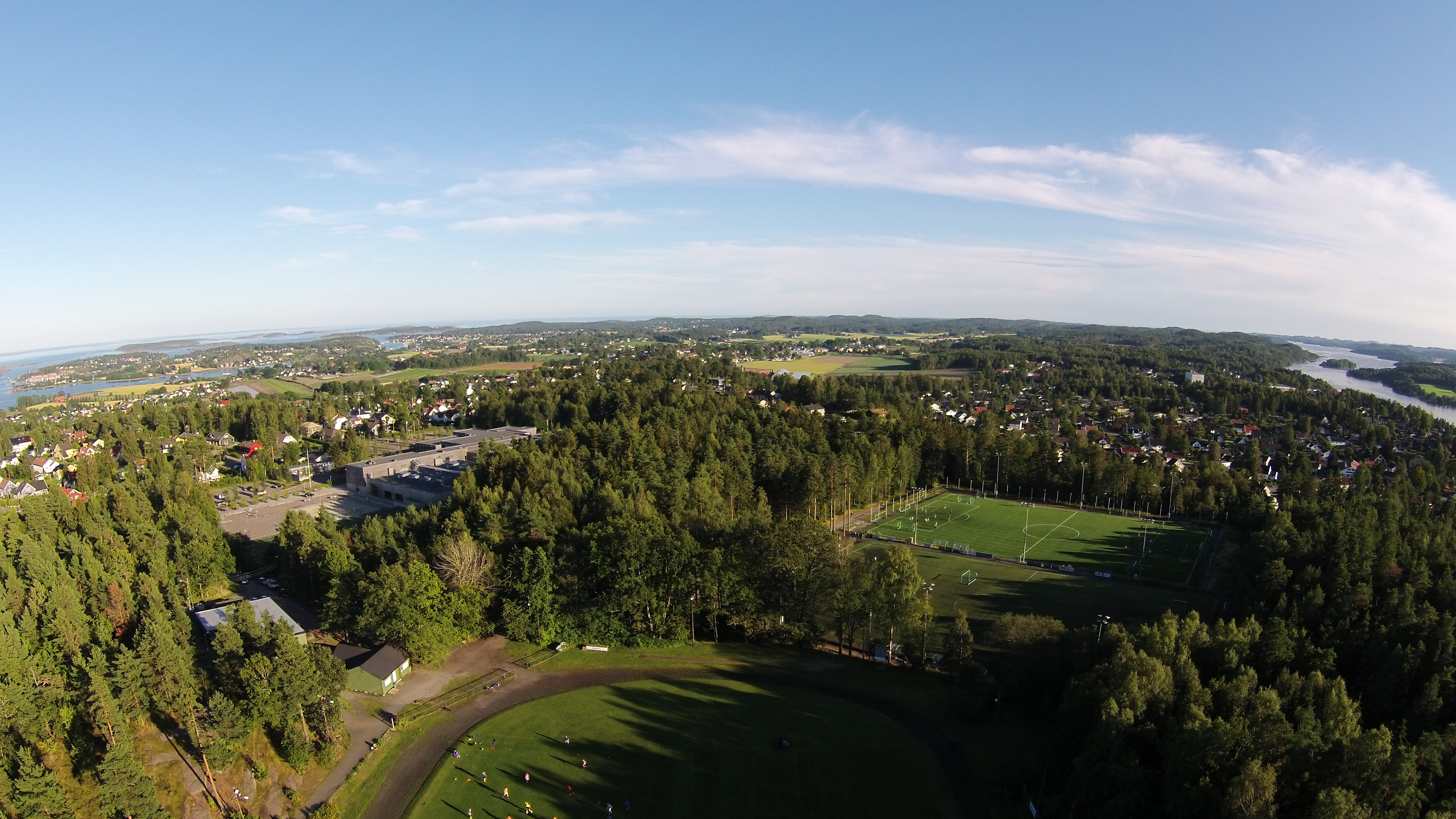
- Aerial view of the northern part of the island
- Interactive map of the island

Geography
- Location: Vestfold, Norway
- Coordinates: 59.18725°N 10.40915°E
- Area: 44.07 km^{2} (17.02 sq mi)
- Length: 11.5 km (7.15 mi)
- Width: 6 km (3.7 mi)
- Highest elevation: 99.7 m (327.1 ft)
- Highest point: Veten

Administration
- Norway
- County: Vestfold
- Municipality: Færder Municipality and Tønsberg Municipality

Nøtterøy is the largest island in Vestfold county, Norway. The 44-square-kilometre (17 sq mi) island is mostly located in Færder Municipality, but a small area on the far northern shore belongs to Tønsberg Municipality. The island is between the Ytre Oslofjord (to the east) and the Tønsbergfjorden (to the west). Most of the northern part of the island is considered part of the city of Tønsberg metropolitan area which spans parts of Tønsberg and Færder municipalities. In the southern part of the island, there are three larger urban villages: Glomstein on the west coast, Kjøpmannskjær on the south coast, and Årøysund on the east coast. Historically, the island was part of the old Nøtterøy Municipality which existed from 1838 until 1 January 2018 when it became part of Færder Municipality.

== Transportation ==
The island is connected to the mainland by the Tønsberg Canal Bridge. The Vrengensund Bridge connects Nøtterøy to the island of Tjøme to the south. There is also a ferry between the village of Tenvik on the southwestern coast of Nøtterøy and the island of Veierland in the Tønsbergfjorden. In the summer, there is also a ferry between Tenvik and Engø in Sandefjord Municipality on the mainland to the southwest of Nøtterøy. Nøtterøy is also connected to the islands of Føynland and Husøy to the northeast by a bridge.

== History ==
The island of Nøtterøy has been inhabited for thousands of years. The areas along the sea were first populated and many burial mounds have been found, especially in the Årøysund areas. Søndre Hella on the western coast of the island has one of the largest burial mounds on the island, likely with more than 20 graves from the Early Iron Age.

Nøtterøy was an important location for telegraphy during the Gunboat War between Sweden and Great Britain from 1807 to 1814, when two telegraph stations were on the island at its two highest points: Vardås and Vetan. During World War II, the Germans planned three gun emplacements on Vardås, which were to have a range of 48 kilometres (30 mi). Only one of the cannons was completed before liberation in 1945.

=== Name ===
The original name of the island was the Old Norse name Njótarøy or simply Njót. The first element is the verb njóta which means "to enjoy" or "to receive benefit from". The last element is øy which means "island".

Historically, the name of the municipality was spelled Nøtterø, using the Riksmal spelling. On 3 November 1917, a royal resolution changed the spelling of the name of the municipality to Nøtterøy. The letter y was added to the end of the word to "Norwegianize" the name (ø is the Danish word for "island" and øy is the Norwegian word).

== Nature ==
The bedrock of the island consists of monzonite rocks: gray to blue-gray larvikite and reddish-brown tønsbergite. It also includes some smaller parts of pegmatite (which may have gem-developed feldspar or moonstone) and diabase. The landscape is slightly hilly, especially in the south and west, reaching its highest point at Veten which reaches 99.7 metres (327 ft) above sea level. Along the sea and other places where the rocky hills have little vegetation, there are large, clear scour marks from the last ice age. The flora on the island is very rich and diverse.

== Media gallery ==
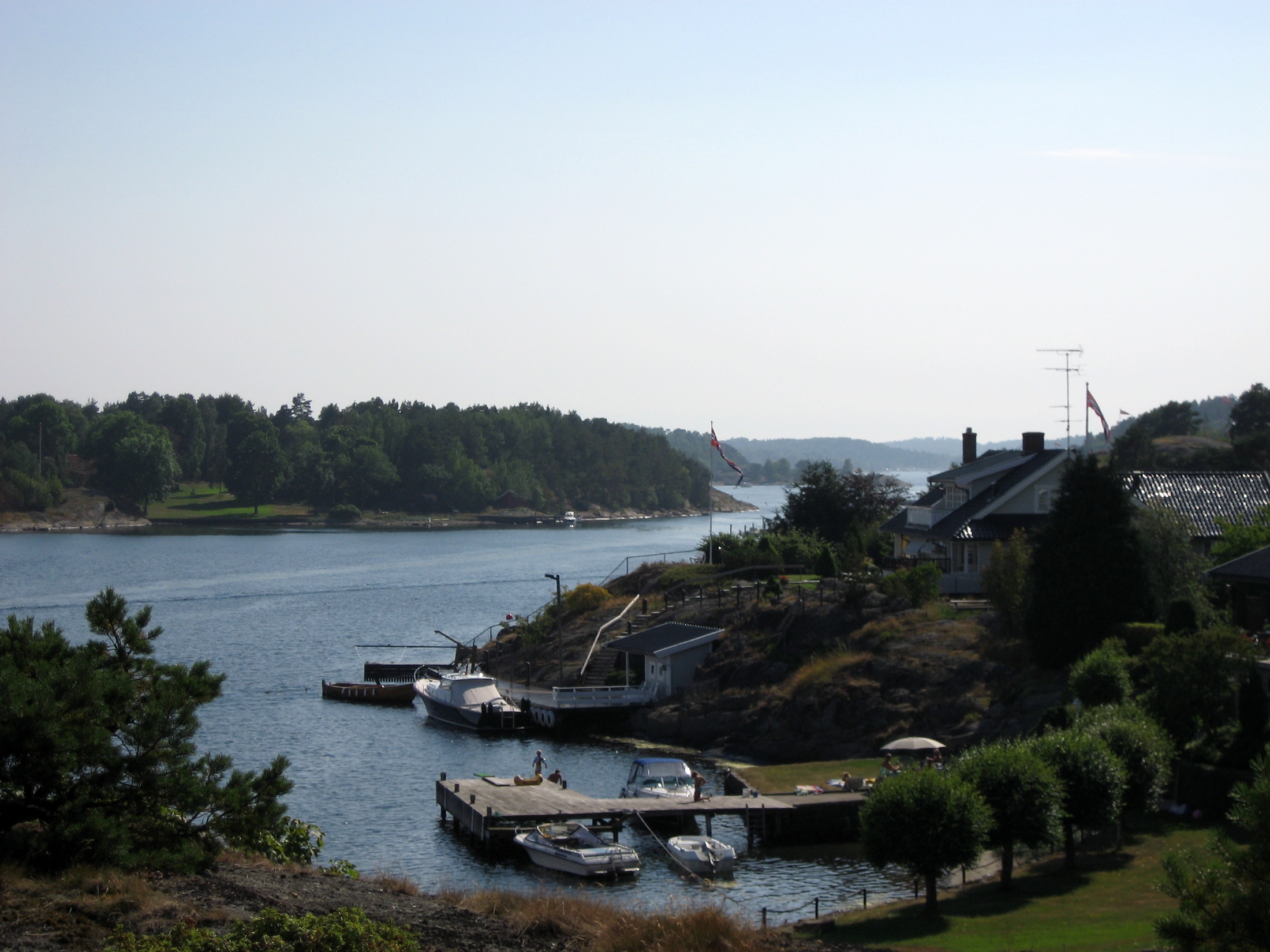
Årøysund area

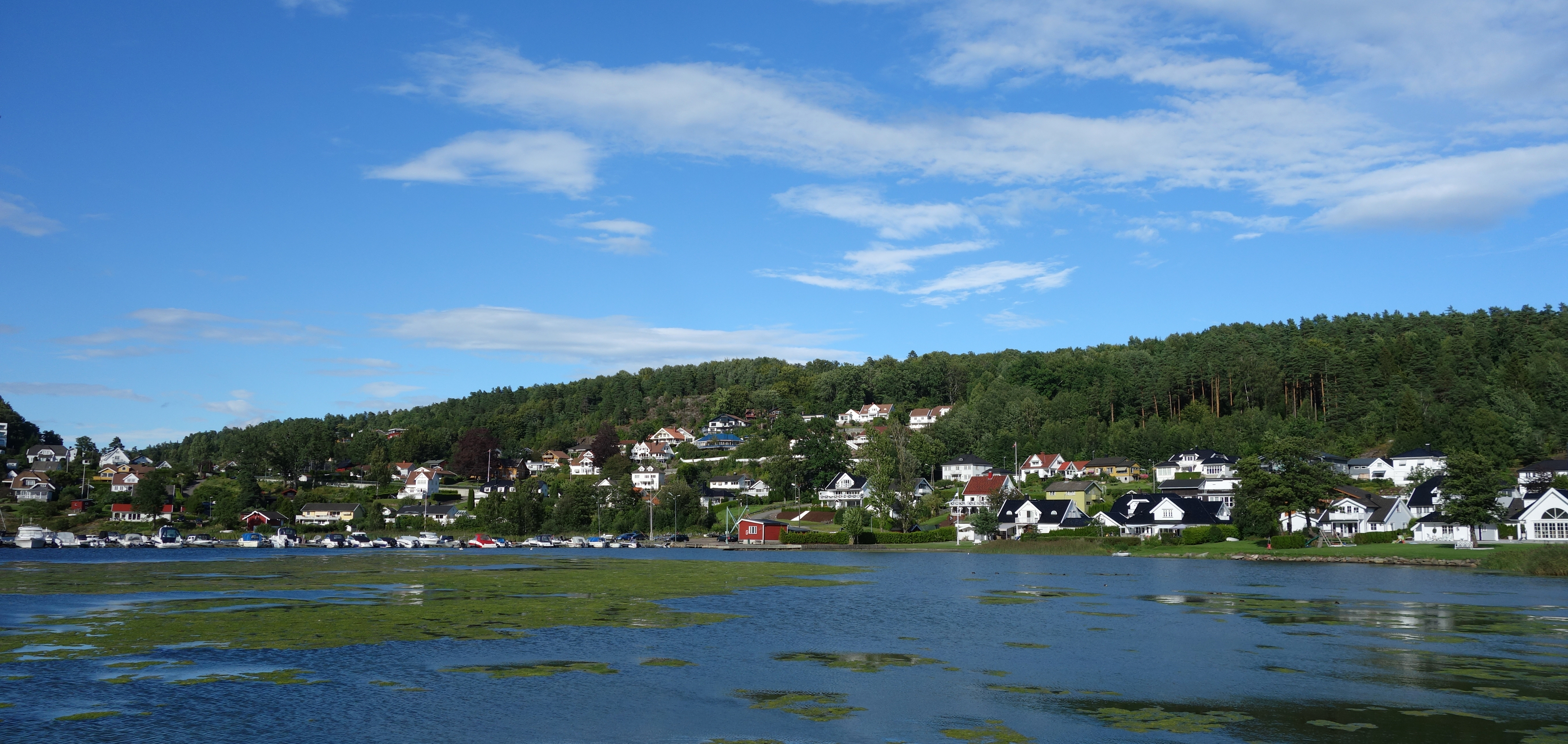
Munkerekka

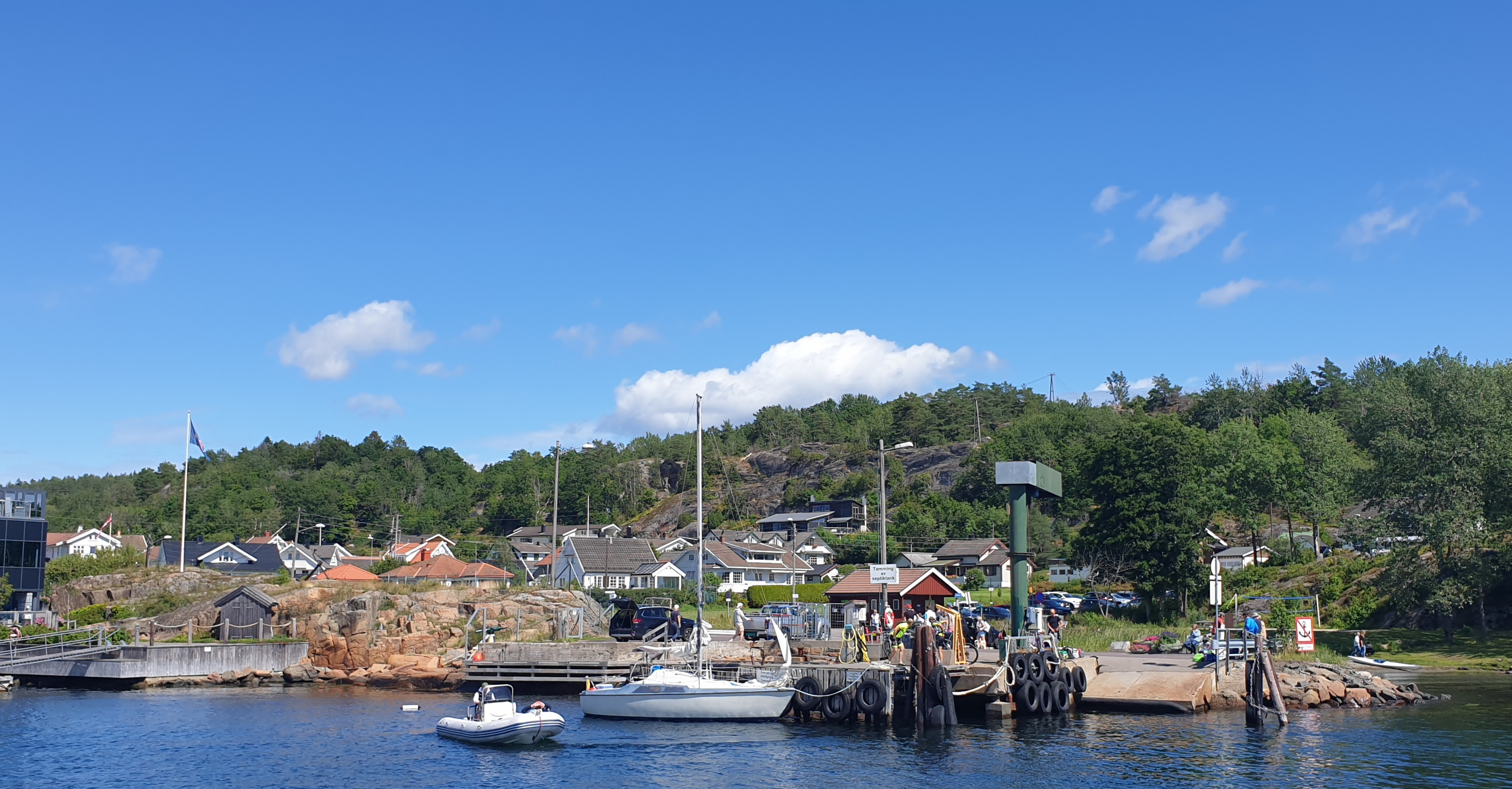
Tenvik harbour

== See also ==
- List of islands of Norway
