= Raet =

Largest terminal moraine in Scandinavia

Coordinates: 58°28′27″N 8°54′42″E

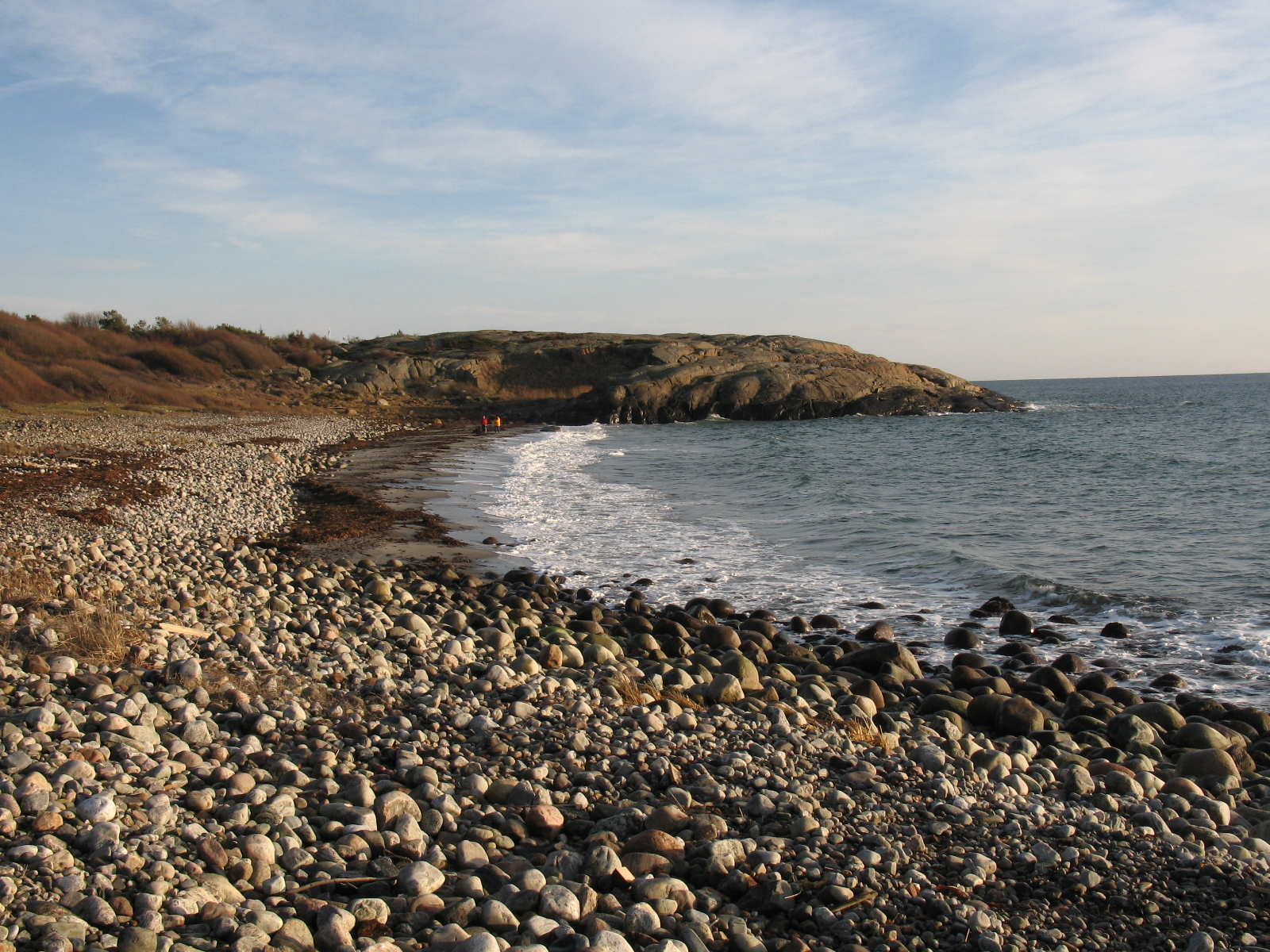
The moraine running along the edge of the Skagerrak in Raet National Park in Norway

Raet is the largest terminal moraine in Scandinavia. It was formed during the end of the last glacial period, 12,800–11,500 years ago, in one of the latest advances of the glaciers. The moraine system extends from Finland, where it is known as Salpausselkä, through Sweden into Østfold in southeast Norway, across the Oslofjord and around the tip of southern Norway, where Raet National Park is located in Agder, then north to northern Norway and the Kola Peninsula in northwest Russia. In several regions there is more than one moraine, an older on the coast or underwater and a younger further inland. The moraines have created numerous lakes by damming watercourses, and several stretches have been used as roads since ancient times. In Norway, both Raet National Park and Jomfruland National Park are along the moraine.

== Formation and name ==
The moraines were left by the retreat of the Fenno-Scandian ice sheet at the end of the Weichselian glaciation, 12,800–11,500 years ago. As the ice retreated, its furthest extent was marked by a deposit of rocks in a variety of sizes, which formed a ridge. Weathering causes the smaller material to sink, leaving large rocks on the surface. The retreating ice sheet left productive agricultural land in many places; the moraine dammed watercourses, creating lakes.

In Norway, the term ra, from rǫð, an Old West Norse word for a gravel ridge, is the name of several farms located along the course of the moraine, notably Ra in Horten Municipality, and has come to be the general term for a terminal moraine. The relative ages of the moraines in Østlandet have been studied.

== Locations ==
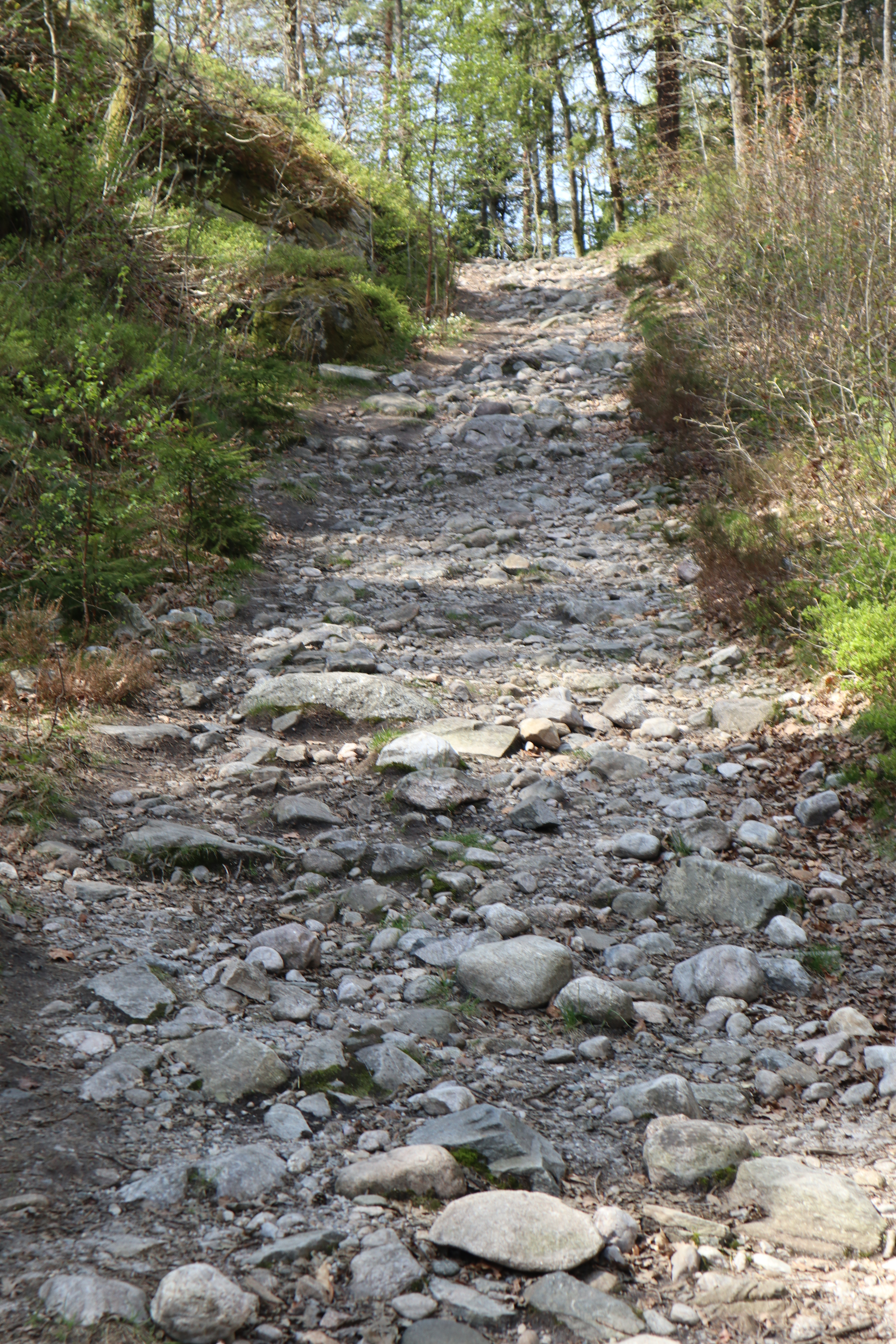
Path along the moraine at Grimstad, Norway

In south Finland, the two parallel moraines are known as Salpausselkä. In Sweden, they form the Central Swedish ice-edge zone; the moraine is particularly noticeable at Hindens Rev, where it forms a peninsula jutting out into the western part of Lake Vänern. The moraine crosses into Østfold in southeast Norway at Halden, crosses under the Oslofjord from Moss Municipality to Horten Municipality, then runs across Vestfold, where Riksvei 19 and the old E18 follow its course. After Brunlanes it runs offshore, where it forms a series of islands; it then passes back on-shore east of Fevik in Agder, at what is now Raet National Park. From there it runs west and then north through Rogaland, Vestland, Trøndelag (where it is called Tautratrinnet because its crossing the Trondheimsfjord forms the island of Tautra), and northern Norway, terminating on the Kola Peninsula in far northwest Russia.

In Norway, the parallel outer moraine seen in some places, which predates the primary moraine by approximately 250 years, is called Ytre Raet (lit. 'outer raet'). The distance between the two is greatest between Sandefjord, Nøtterøy, and Tønsberg, where the outer moraine has contributed to forming excellent agricultural land.

The moraine system has given rise to lakes including Lake Ladoga and Saimaa in Finland, Femsjøen and Vansjø in Østfold, Borrevannet, Goksjø, and Farris in Vestfold, and Rore in Aust-Agder.

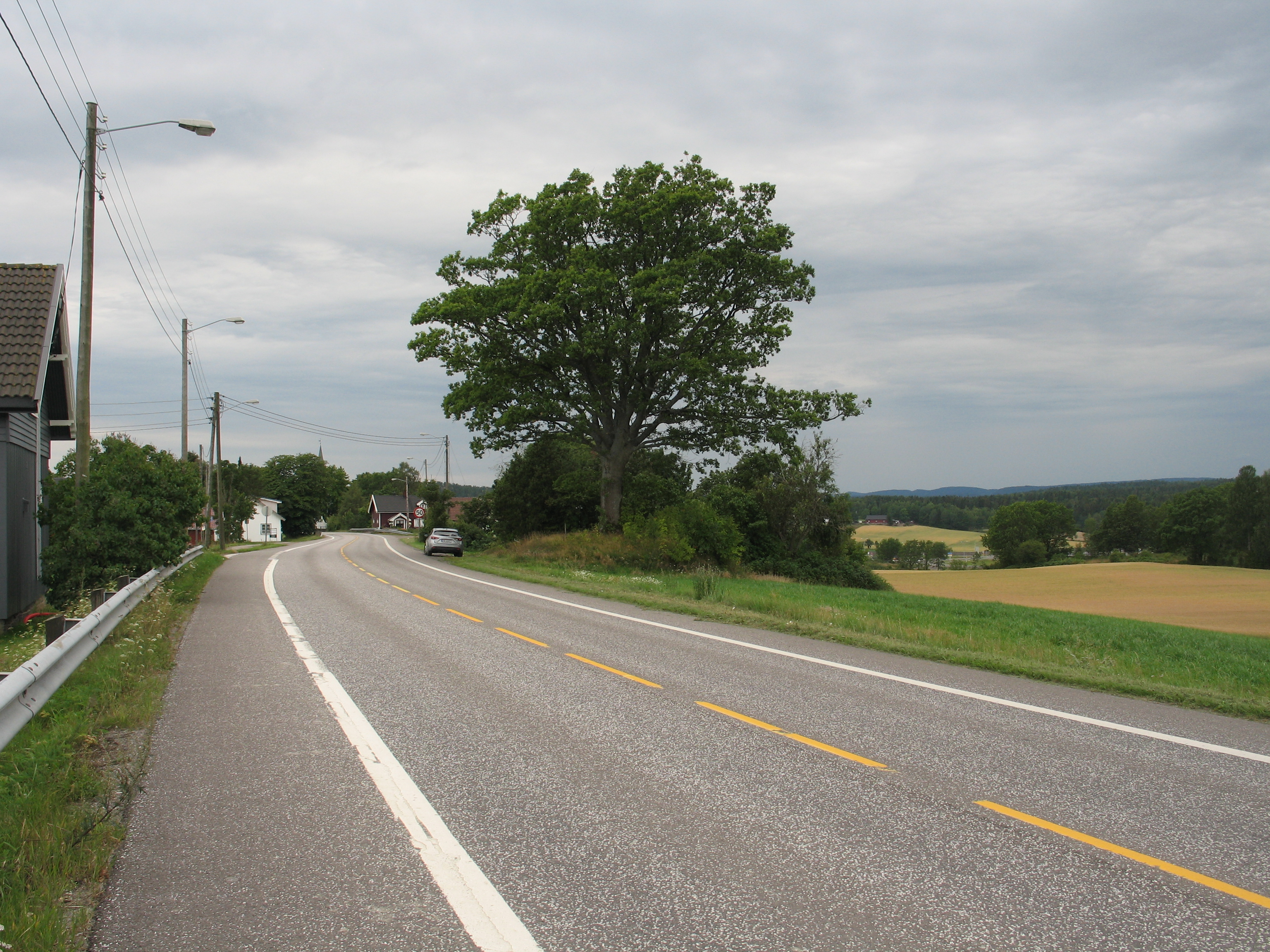
Grave mound in Sandefjord Municipality beside an ancient road following the moraine ridge

== Roads and settlements ==
Particularly in Vestfold and Østfold, where the ridge formed by the moraine is prominent, ancient roads often ran along it. E6 from Halden to Moss in Østfold and E18 in Vestfold follow Raet for long distances; stretches of the latter still bear the name Raveien ('Ra way') for it. In addition to farms, settlements formed along the road, such as at Helgeroa, a natural transshipment point where it met the sea. In the Iron Age, burial mounds were often located near it.

== Protection ==
In Norway, several areas of Raet are protected as national parks, protected landscapes and nature reserves. Two national parks are on the Raet: Jomfruland National Park in Telemark and Raet National Park in Agder; parts of the latter are nature reserves. In Vestfold, Mølen and Bøkeskogen in Larvik Municipality and Bokemoa in Sandefjord Municipality are all protected areas. The UNESCO Gea Norvegica Geopark has as one of its purposes increasing knowledge about the importance of geology, and displays information boards concerning Raet at Mølen in Larvik Municipality.

In 1998, the Nordic Council of Ministers announced that several locations along Raet should be protected for future study of climate change.

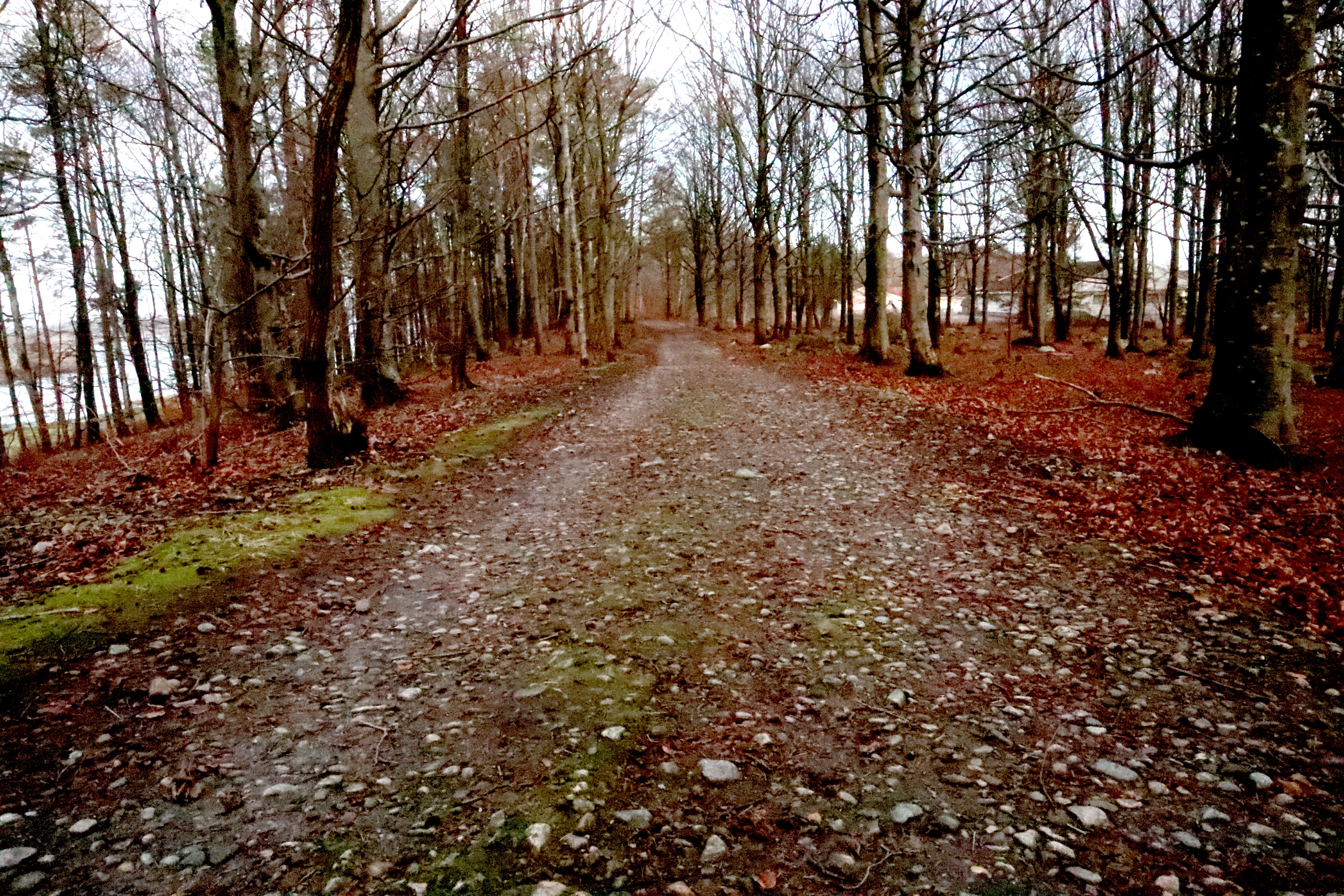
Road along the moraine at Haslatangen in Raet National Park

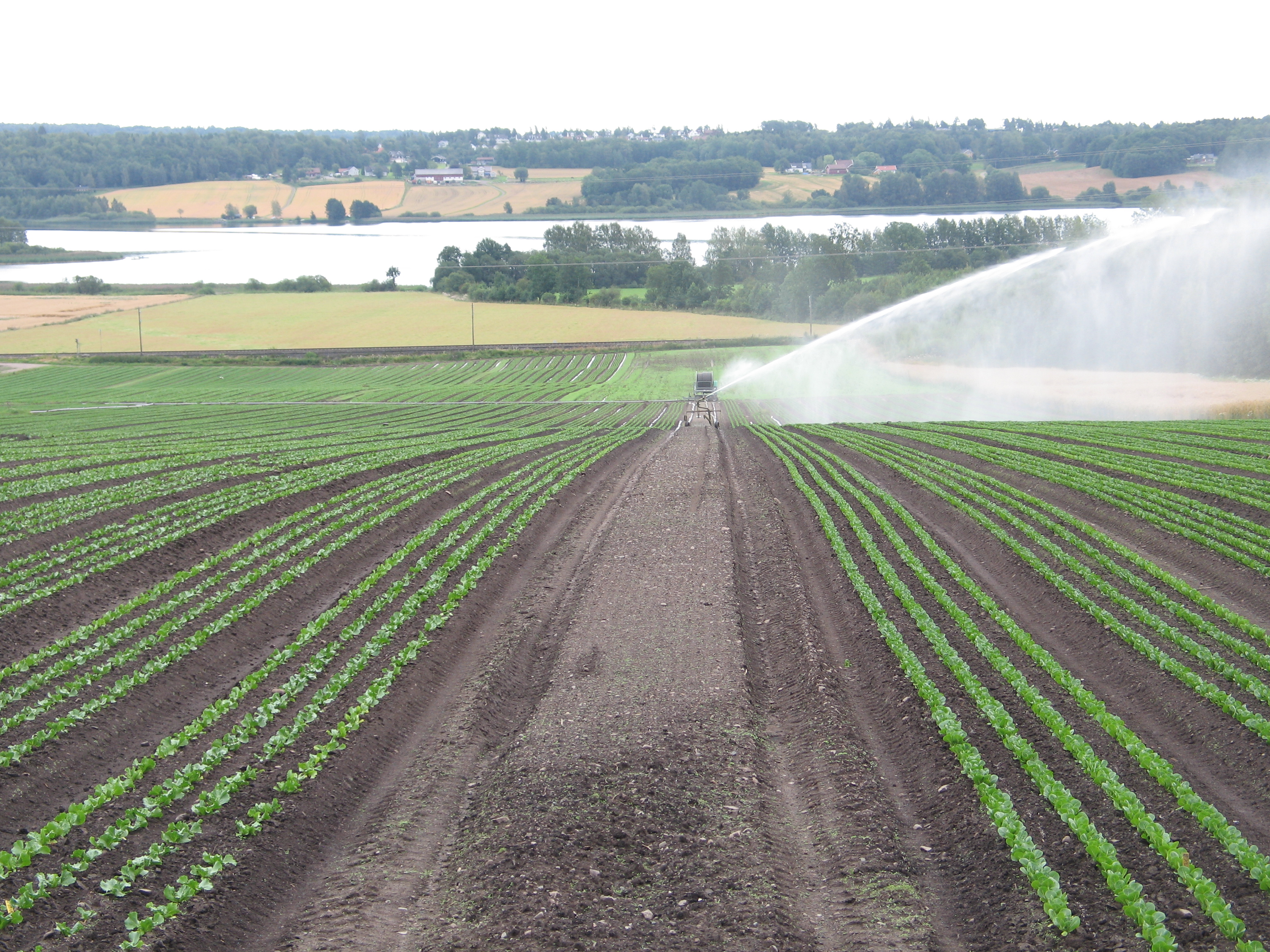
Lettuce cultivation in Stokke Municipality, near Ytre Raet

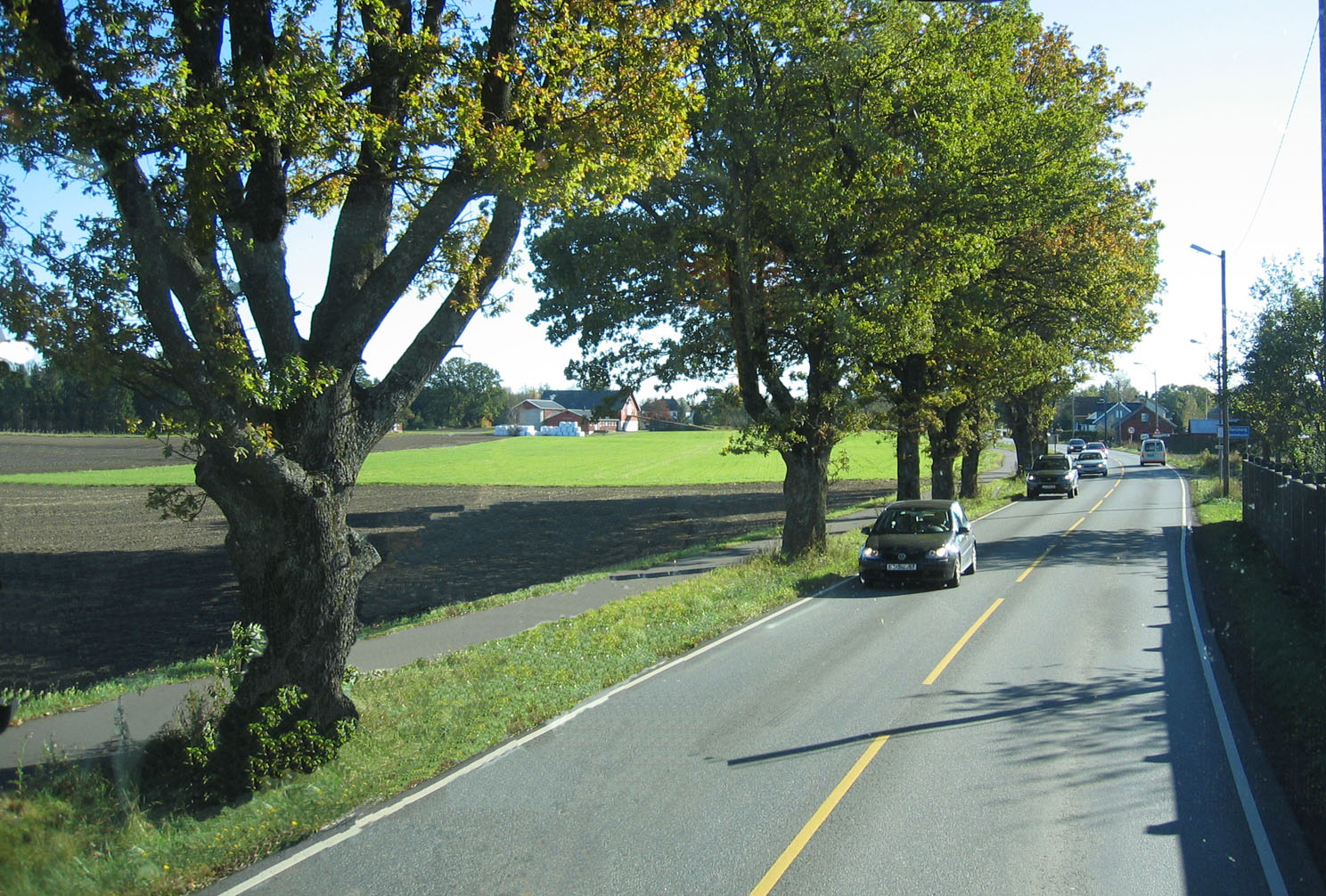
Riksvei 19 between Horten and Tønsberg, on the ancient road near the farm Ra
