= Larvik (town) =

Town in Vestfold, Norway

Larvik Laurvig (historic)
- Town/City
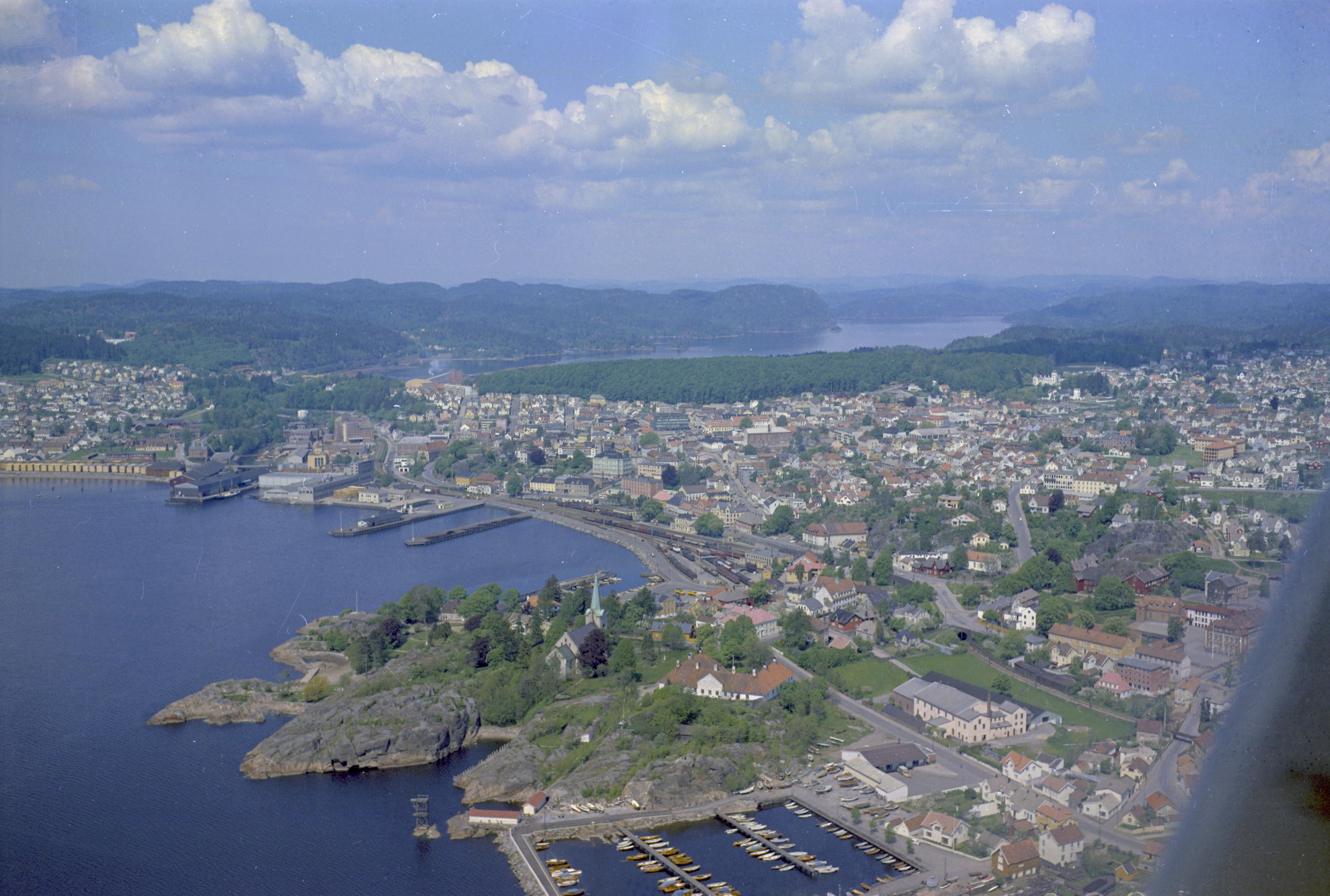
- View of the town harbour, c. 1964
- Nickname: Bakkebyen (lit. 'Town of Hills')
- Interactive map of Larvik
- Coordinates: 59.05328°N 10.03518°E
- Country: Norway
- Region: Eastern Norway
- County: Vestfold
- Municipality: Larvik Municipality
- Established as
- Kjøpstad: 1671

Area
  - Total: 14.89 km^{2} (5.75 sq mi)
- Elevation: 44 m (144 ft)

Population (2026)
  - Total: 27,826
  - Density: 1,869/km^{2} (4,840/sq mi)
- Demonym(s): Larvikar; Larviker; Larviking
- Time zone: UTC+01:00 (CET)
  - Summer (DST): UTC+02:00 (CEST)
- Post Code: 3256 Larvik

Larvik (pronounced [²lɑrviːk]; locally [²lærviːk]) is a town/city in Larvik Municipality in Vestfold county, Norway. The town is the administrative centre of the large municipality which stretches inland for over 50 kilometres (31 mi) from the coast. The town is located near the Skagerrak coast, wedged between the Larviksfjorden to the south, the lake Farris to the north, and the river Lågen along the east side of the town. The town was established in 1671. The town became a self-governing municipality on 1 January 1838 under the formannskapsdistrikt law. The town remained self-governing until 1 January 1988 when it was merged with the neighboring town of Stavern and three neighboring rural municipalities to form a much larger Larvik Municipality.

The 14.89-square-kilometre (3,680-acre) town has a population (2026) of 27,826 and a population density of 1,869 inhabitants per square kilometre (4,840/sq mi). This means over half of the population of Larvik Municipality lives in the city, the rest live in the much more rural areas of the municipality.

The town originally was built in the Tollerodden area where the Larvik Church is located. The town is one of the largest ports in Vestfold county. It has car ferry connections across the Skagerrak to Hirtshals in Denmark. The Vestfoldbanen railway line runs through the town, stopping at Larvik Station. The European route E18 highway passes through the north side of the town, connecting the capital of Oslo with Southern Norway.

== History ==
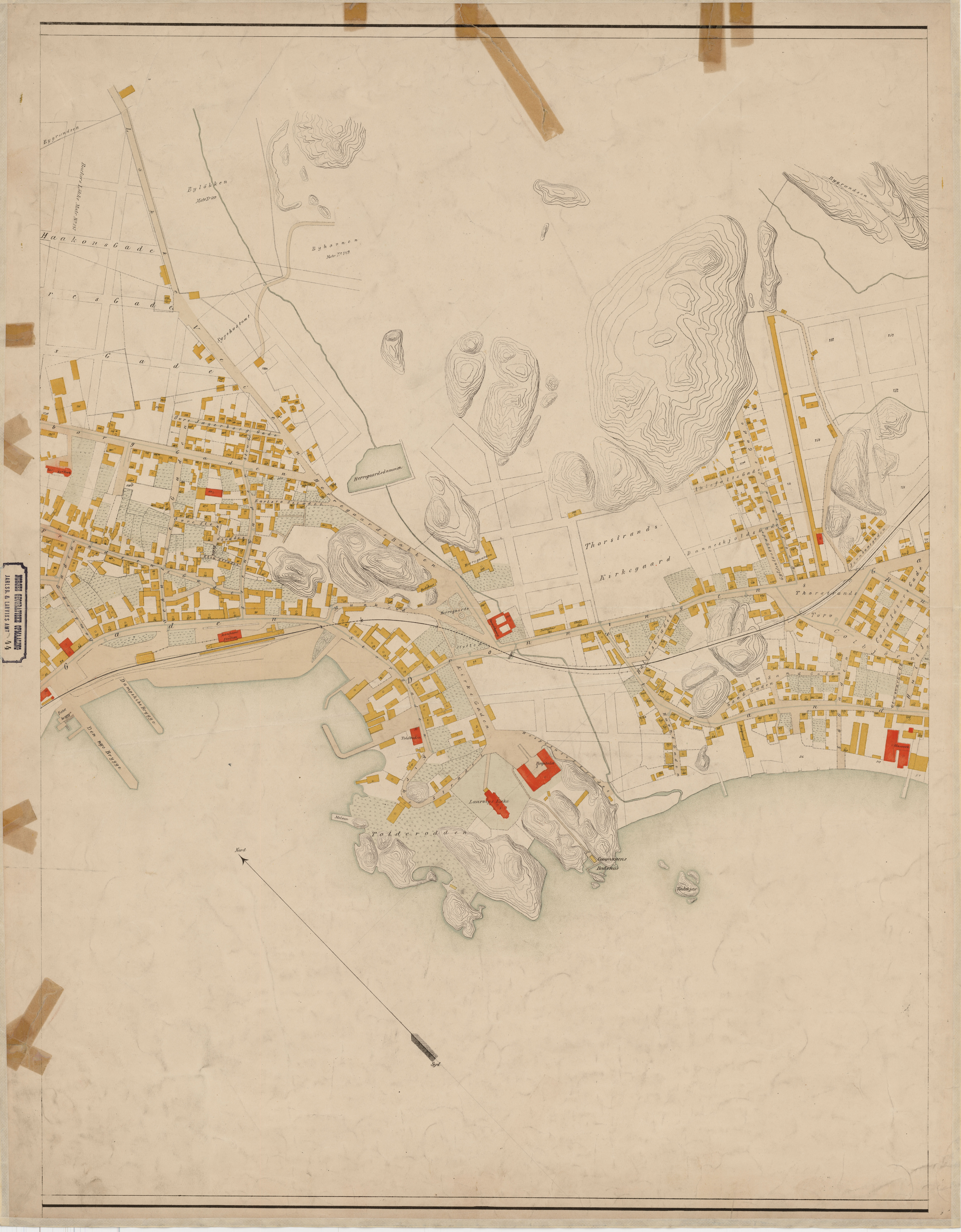
Old map of Laurvig (c. 1884)

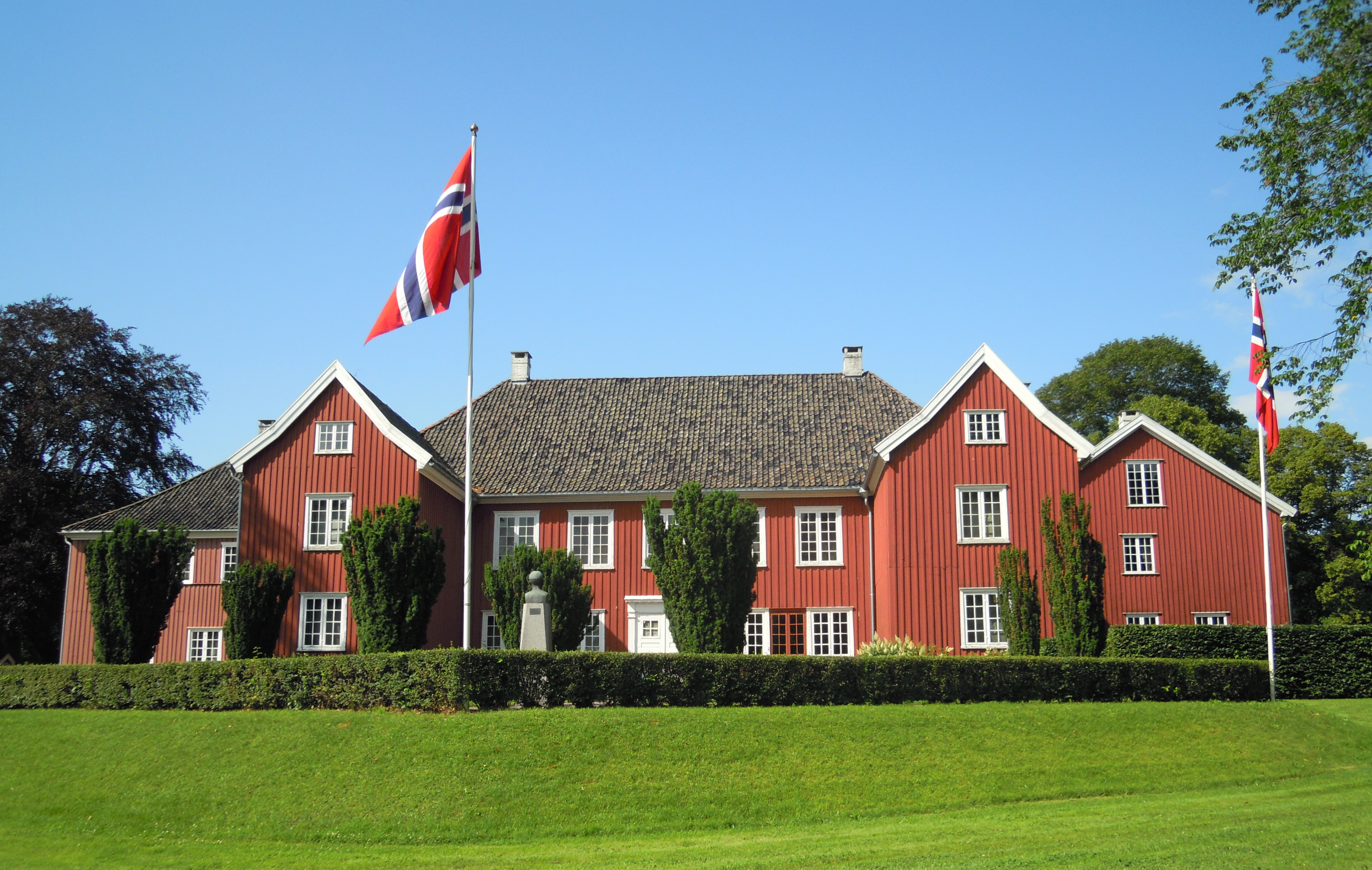
Herregården estate in Larvik

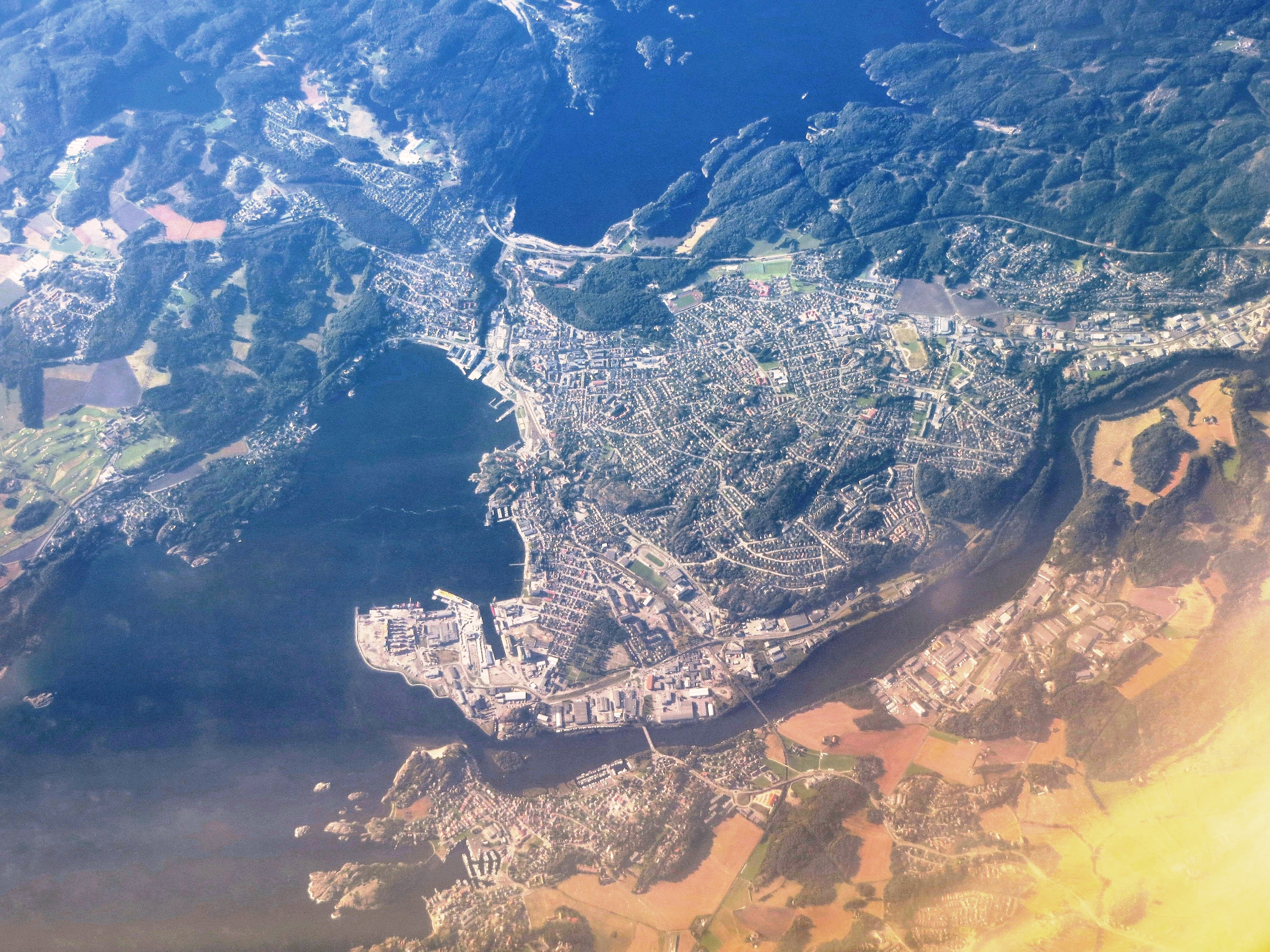
Aerial view of the city in 2012

Various remains from the Stone Age have been discovered in the Larvik area, for instance by Torpevannet by Helgeroa village. Raet goes through all of Vestfold County before peaking out of the ocean in Mølen. Ancient peoples have carried rocks from Raet and constructed vast numbers of burial mounds at Mølen. During the Roman Iron Age, ancient peoples erected a stone monument resembling a ship at Istrehågan, one of Norway's greatest remains from prehistoric times.

About 4 kilometres (2.5 mi) southeast of the town is Skiringssal, an archaeological site where archaeologists first discovered burial mounds and an ancient Viking hall, and later uncovered the nearby remains of an ancient town, Kaupang. This is now known as the oldest known merchant town in Norway. There was international trade from this area, over 1,200 years ago. Skiringssal has remains from the oldest town yet discovered in the Nordic countries, and it was one of Scandinavia's earliest urban sites.

Larvik (which historically used the Danish spelling: Laurvig) was an old coastal village. In 1671, the village received kjøpstad (market town) status in 1671 when Ulrik Fredrik Gyldenløvebought the Fritsø estate. He later became the first Count of Laurvig. The count built a new residence in 1674, "Herregården", which can still be visited today.

The town survived from the timber trade, boat building, and shipping. A major industry in the town was the Fritsø Ironworks, which was operated until 1868.

The whole Larvik area was owned by a Danish Count (grevskap) until 1817. Since the rest of Norway had come under Swedish rule in 1814, the county was purchased by four local businessmen in 1817. Then in 1821, it became part of the newly created Jarslberg og Laurvigs amt (county).

Larvik is also the site of the Treschow estate, "Fritzøehus", which is currently owned by the heirs of Mille-Marie Treschow, reportedly "Norway's richest woman". The Treschow estate was created in 1835 when Willum Frederik Treschow bought the county from the Danish crown, who in turn had bought the county from the local consortium "grevlingene", four local entrepreneurs who proved unable to manage the ownership financially (the consortium had bought the county from the Danish crown in 1817 originally, the crown taking over the county when the last of the counts had to sell it because of debt).

Larvik, along with neighbouring cities of Sandefjord and Tønsberg, were the three dominant whaling cities of Norway in the late 19th and early 20th centuries.

The city of Larvik was a 19th-century spa community, home of Larvik Bath. The spa welcomed several members of government and also Russian oligarchs. The royal family, King Haakon VII and Queen Maud, vacationed at the bath in 1906. The spa also welcomed Bjørnstjerne Bjørnson in 1909, who wrote some of his lasts poems in Larvik, and Knut Hamsun in 1917. Hamsun wrote his novel Growth of the Soil in Larvik, which later earned him the 1920 Nobel Prize for Literature.

== Government ==
In Norway, municipalities are the unit of local government. This means that cities and towns are simply designations for urban areas, but under current Norwegian law, they have no actual government authority. The town of Larvik lies within Larvik Municipality and is therefore governed by the municipal council of Larvik Municipality.

== See also ==
- List of towns and cities in Norway
