= Mølen =

Geopark in Larvik, Norway

Coordinates: 59°29′07″N 10°29′56″E

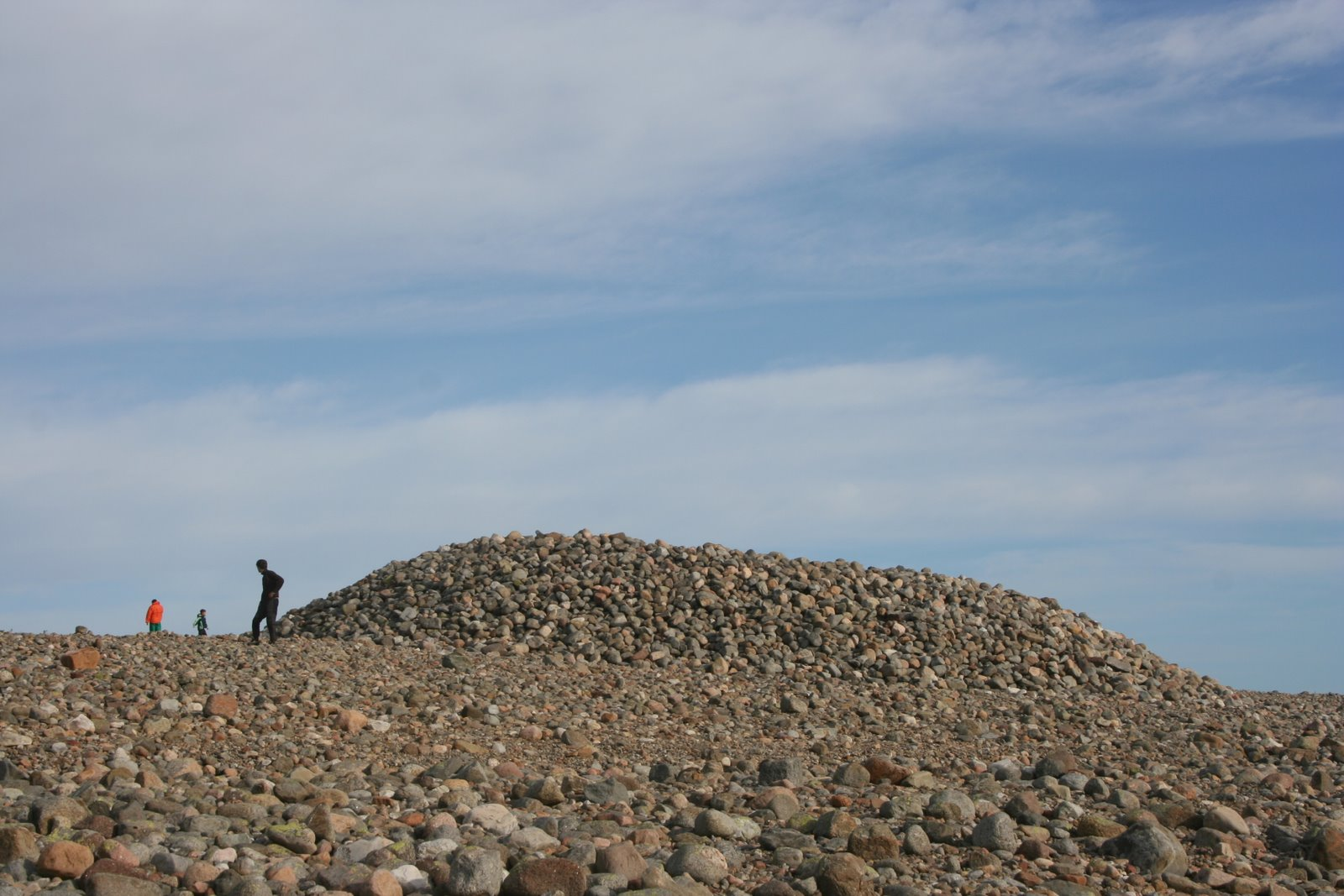
A cairn at Mølen, with a human for scale.

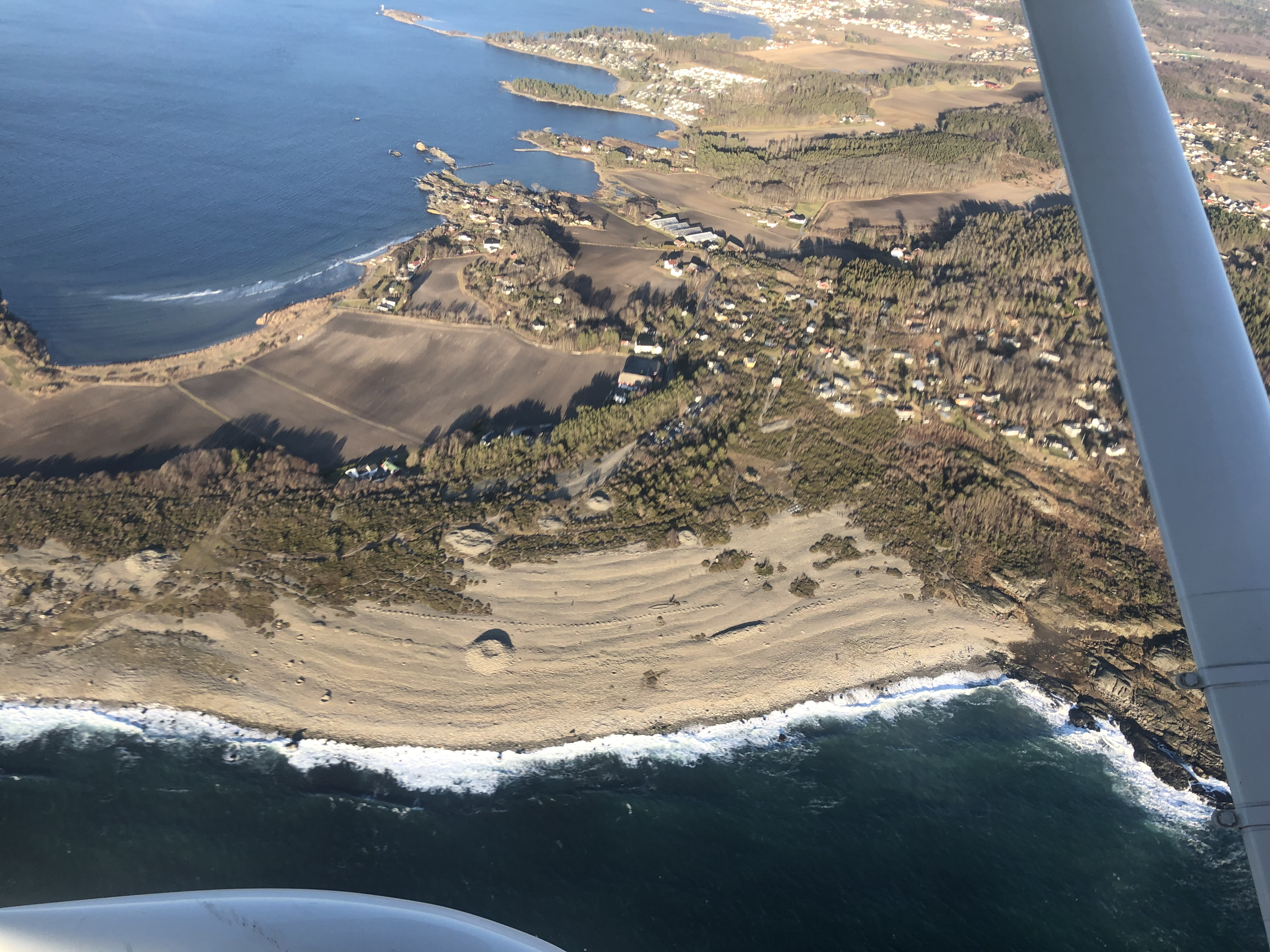
Mølen as seen from the air with the cairns visible

Mølen is a coastal geopark in the southwestern part of Larvik Municipality in Vestfold county, Norway. It is located along the sea, southwest of the village of Helgeroa and northwest of the village of Nevlunghavn. The park is Norway's largest beach made up of rolling stones. It is a part of Vestfoldraet, the terrain left behind after the end of the most recent ice age around 10,000 years ago. Mølen is one of Larvik's most popular tourist attractions. It is home to over a hundred types of rock, including Norway's national stone, Larvikite, which is named from the area.

The wind and sea have lashed the landscape of Mølen for thousands of years, and the place takes its name from the Old Norse word "mol", meaning a stone mound or bank of stones.

Mølen first received protected status in 1939 due to its ancient burial mounds. Mølen is home to over 230 cairns, some exceeding 35 metres (115 ft) in diameter. Excavations have dated the cairns to the Bronze Age 900-600 BCE. The cairns have been purchased and acquired by the University Museum of National Antiquities.

Mølen received a new protection status in 1970 due its rich and unusual avifauna. Mølen is a habitat for a variety of rare bird species. Between 316 and 320 species of birds have been recorded at Mølen, more species than at any other site in Norway.

It became the first UNESCO Global Geopark in the Nordics in 2008.

== Cultural history ==
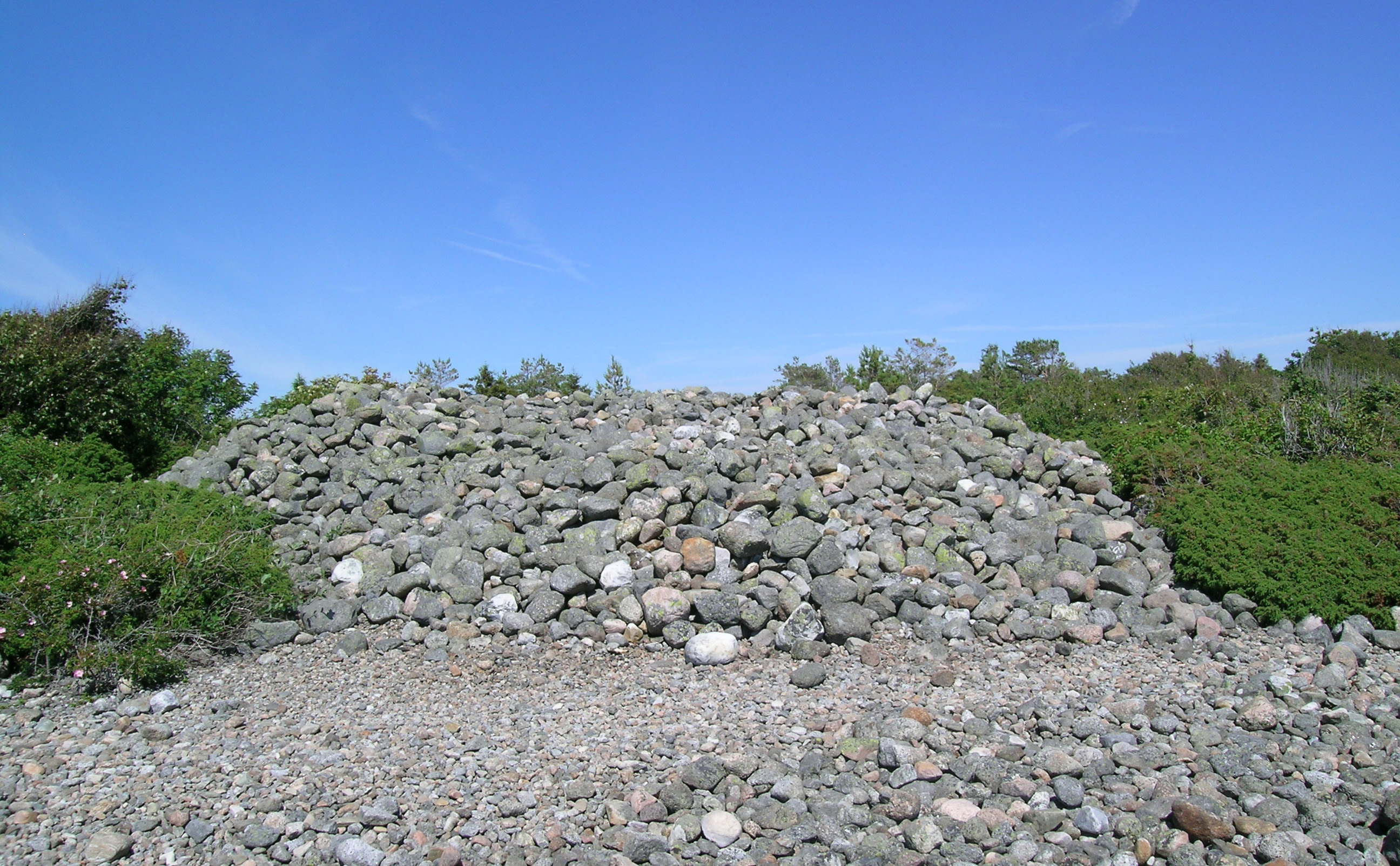
Burial mound at Mølen.

The cultural landscape of Mølen, with its total of 230 cairns, is one of the most notable in Norway. The area has 16 large cairns, many up to 35 metres (115 ft) in diameter, with almost 200 small cairns in rows parallel to the shoreline. In one of the cairns, burnt stones were found; this could be the result of a cremation dating back to the 5th century A.D. The small cairns may symbolize warriors who fell in battle or were shipwrecked together with their captain.

The first archeological records of Mølen date to 1838 when twelve cairns were mentioned. Historians and archeologists have debated whether Eysteinn Hálfdansson, former king of Vestfold, is buried at Mølen.

The cairns, which were clearly visible to shipping, not only signaled prosperity but probably also served as "sea markers" along the shipping lanes between different trading centres. Mølen and its bay could have been one of several transit sites in Eastern Norway, with goods from here being exchanged and conveyed to the surrounding settlements.

It is not clear why some graves are mounded, while others are of simpler form. It is unknown what ceremonies were linked to the burials, but it is likely that the most powerful members of society were given the most impressive grave sites, while ordinary people received simpler types of graves or were buried without any mound, cairn or bauta stones as grave markers.

=== Plundering ===
The cairns closest to the sea are from the late Iron Age and Viking times, while those on higher ground are probably older; theoretically, they could be from the late Bronze Age, as was previously assumed. However, recent research shows that all the cairns of Mølen are probably from the Iron Age. Almost all the cairns have one or more depressions from plundering or so-called "haugbrot". "Haugbrot" refers to ritual removal of the dead; the reason why this was done is not clear. The low boat-shaped stone setting was excavated in the 1970s. It is a grave where a ship had probably been burnt. Iron nails and carbon were found, and these have been dated to approximately 250 A.D.

== Geology ==
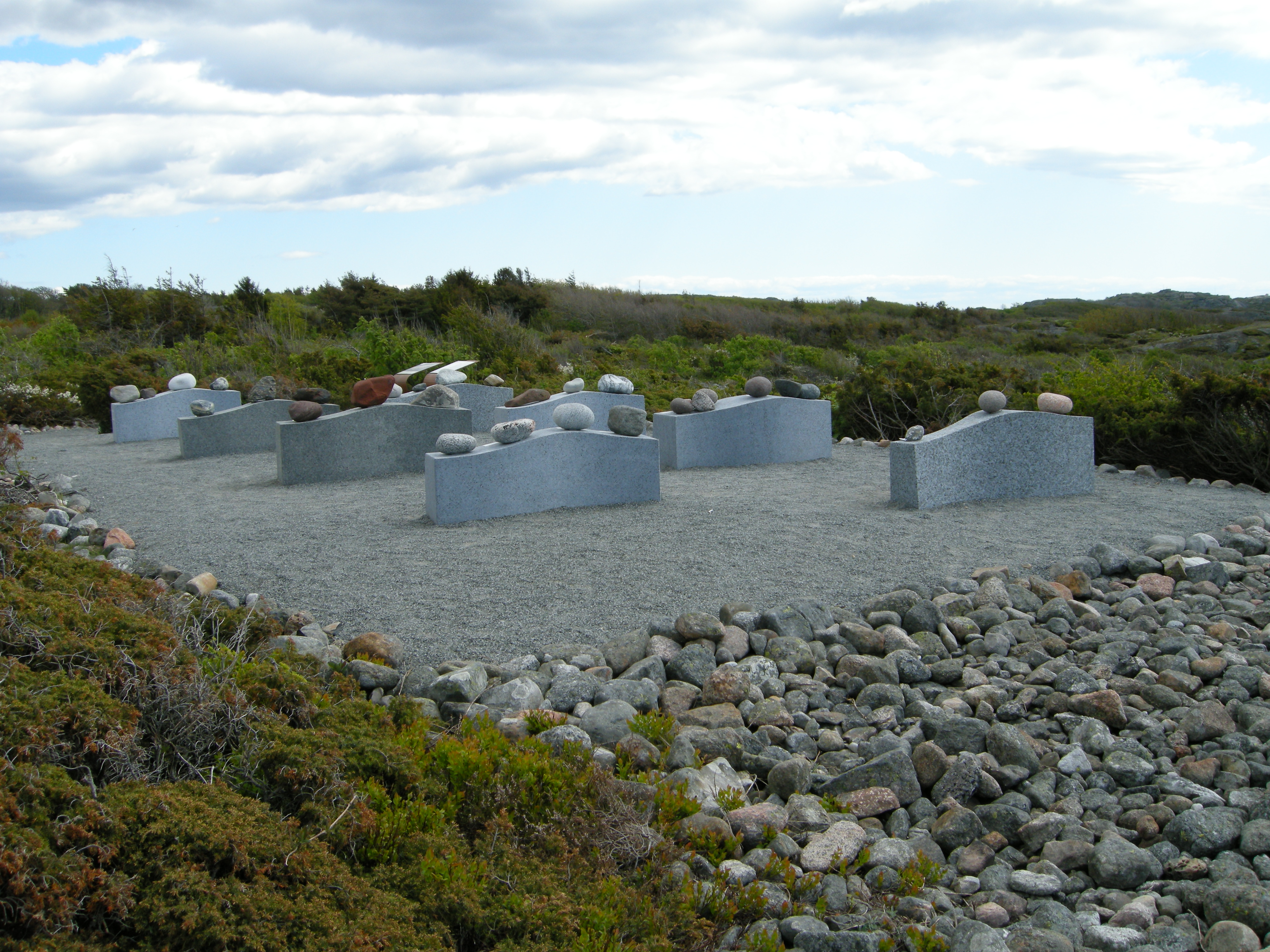
Display of local types of rocks.

There are traces of volcanic activity from the Brunlanes volcano on Saltstein, a southerly headland with a beach composed almost entirely of pebbles. The volcano itself (~280 Ma) has eroded, but the dark types of rock on Saltstein (called larvikites, unique syenite location of this type in the world, but for a minor occurrence in central Canada.) are remnants of the defunct shield volcano. Relics have also been found on Oddane Fort, on the skerries between Oddane, and other places further south.

=== Volcanic activity ===
The long headland of Saltstein comprises alternating layers of lava and volcanic ash. The lava is in the form of dark types of rock with white flecks. The white flecks were originally gas-filled bubbles. Volcanic ash can be seen in layers between individual layers of lava; it is often very stratified and green or brownish in colour. The ash resulted from volcanic eruptions. In the far west of Saltstein, there is an approximately 4-metre (13 ft) thick layer of fragments of rock of various sizes. This layer was created in a massive volcanic eruption. Molten basalt and rhomb porphyry forced its way up through the volcano after the lava had overflowed. These substances can be seen as east-west corridors on Saltstein.

Later in the carbon time series, there was basaltic volcanic activity near Skien, Holmestrand, Jeløya, and on Krokskogen and Kolsås, south of Oslo. This was the earliest volcanic activity in the Oslo area. The lava flows were similar to those on basal volcanoes such as on Iceland, Mount Etna and Hawaii. The Brunlanes volcano has a very particular composition found today in eastern Congo near the town of Goma.

== Glaciation ==
The smooth, sloping rock of Saltstein was ground by the glacier during the last ice age. Abraded strips show that the glacier moved from north to south. The North Sea Trail from Nevlunghavn or Helgeroa passes through the area. It is part of a 5,000-kilometre (3,100 mi) coastal walk in Norway, Sweden, Denmark, Germany, Netherlands, England and Scotland.

== Flora and fauna ==
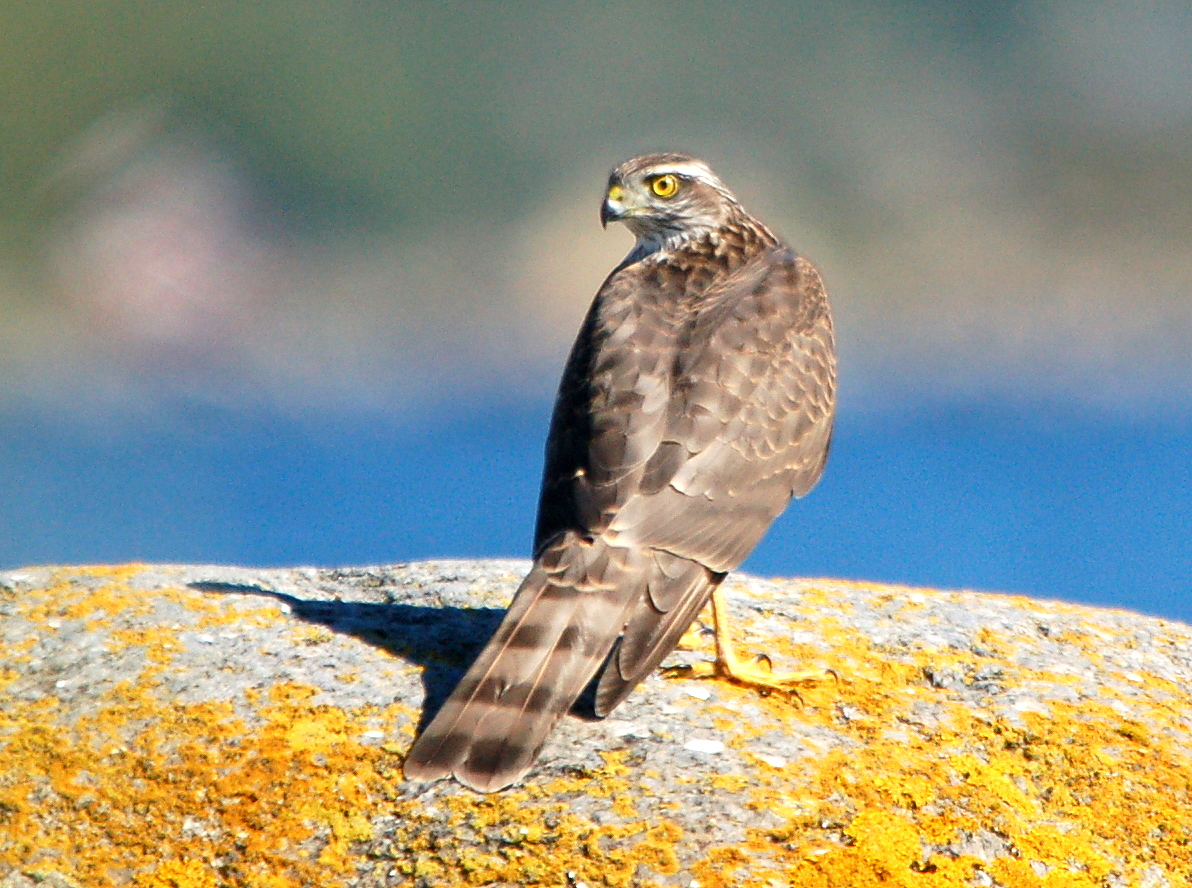
Eurasian sparrowhawk at Mølen

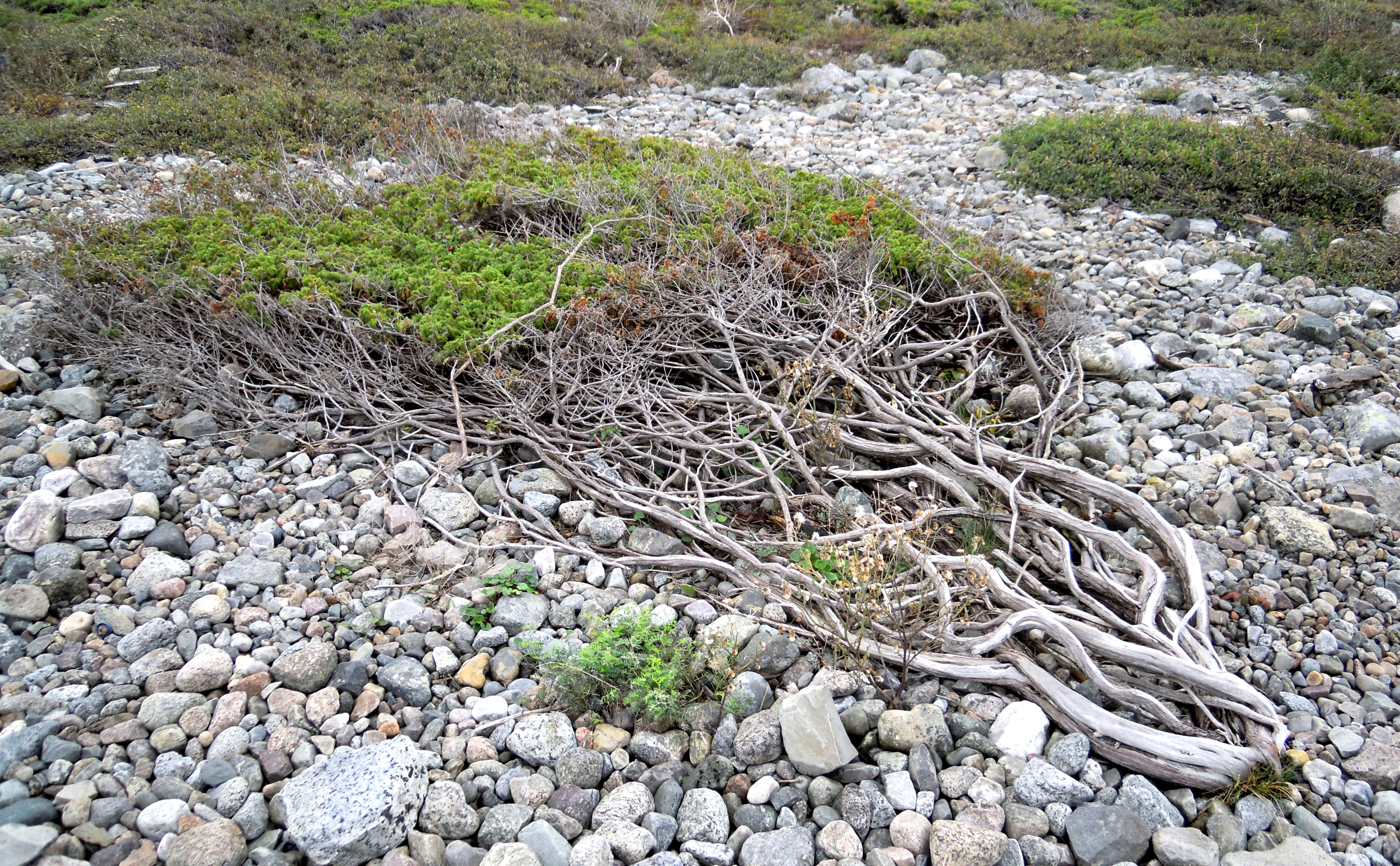
Common juniper tree at Mølen.

310 bird species were observed at Mølen from 1976-1990. As of 1995, 320 bird species have been observed at Mølen. 1.5 million birds pass through Mølen every year on their way south for the winter. Some of the rare species that have been observed here are the Magnificent frigatebird, Booted eagle, Olive-backed pipit, Scaly thrush, Black-winged pratincole, Pine bunting, Western black-eared wheatear, Red-tailed shrike, Marsh sandpiper, Pallas's gull, Franklin's gull, and Ring-billed gull. The Mølen Bird Sanctuary (Norwegian: Mølen fuglefredningsområde) was established in 1981 and stretches from Oddane towards Store Arøya, and further to Lamøya and to Rogn outside Omlidstranda.

A number of rare plant species have been recorded at Mølen. Some common species here are the Common juniper, Sloe, Common cotoneaster, Nordic currant, Black crowberry, Goldmoss stonecrop, Bird's-foot trefoil, Common kidneyvetch, Bloody crane's-bill, Common milkwort, Lady's bedstraw, Calluna, and Sheep's-fescue.

== Environmental disasters ==
In the summer of 2009, Mølen was covered in oil by the Full City oil spill. A subsequent study found that the marine and fish life suffered no significant changes.

== Gallery ==
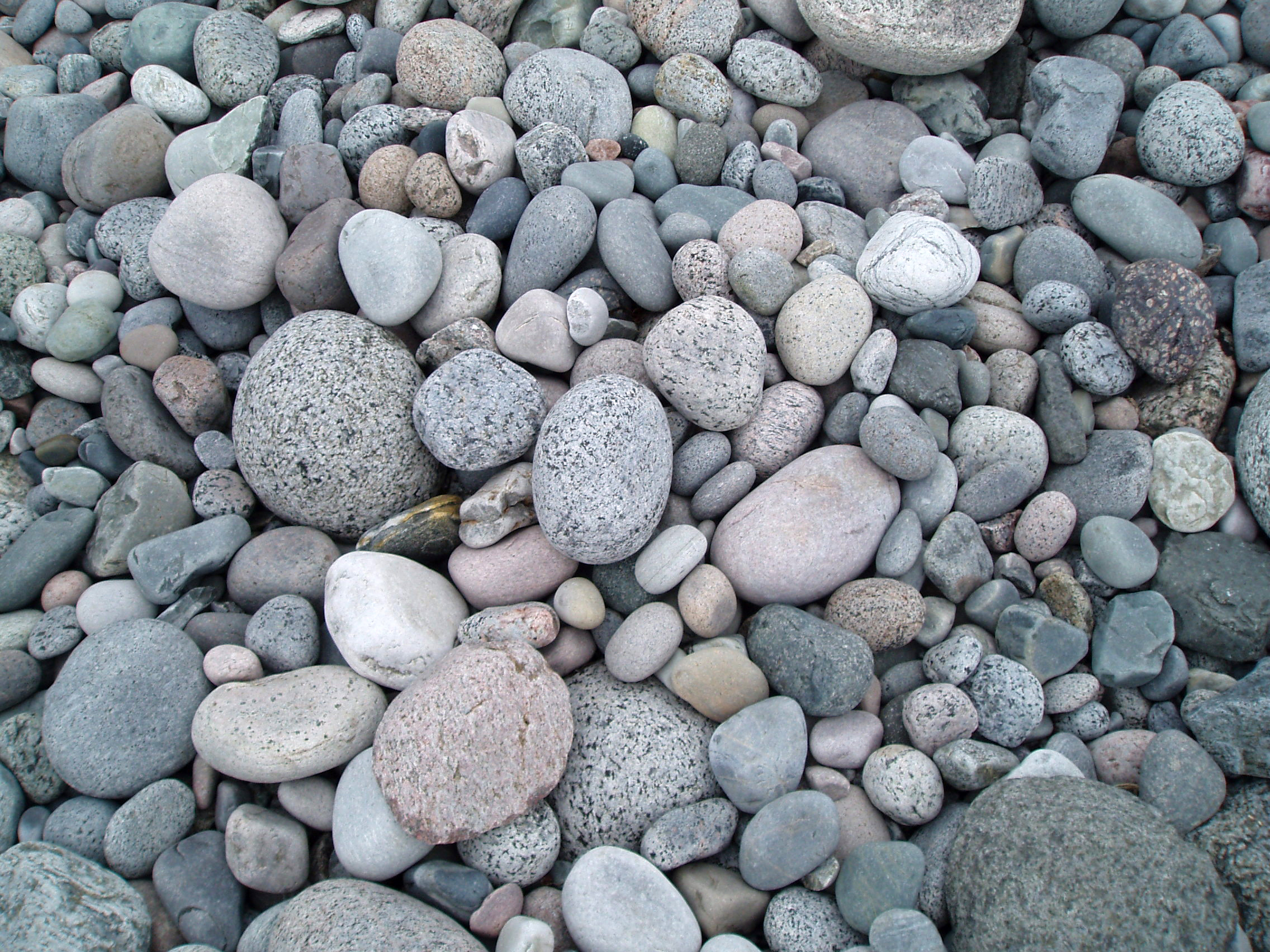

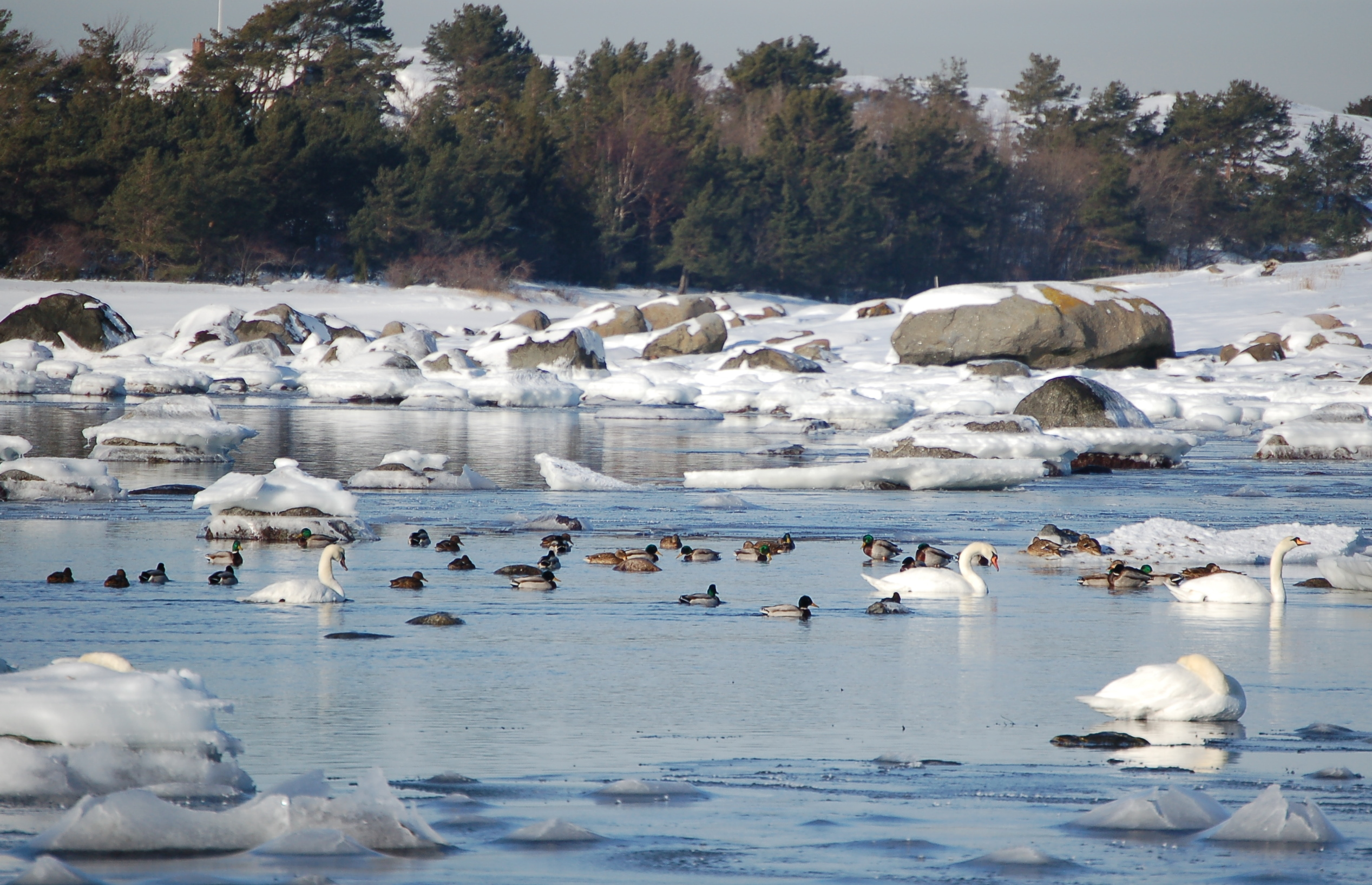

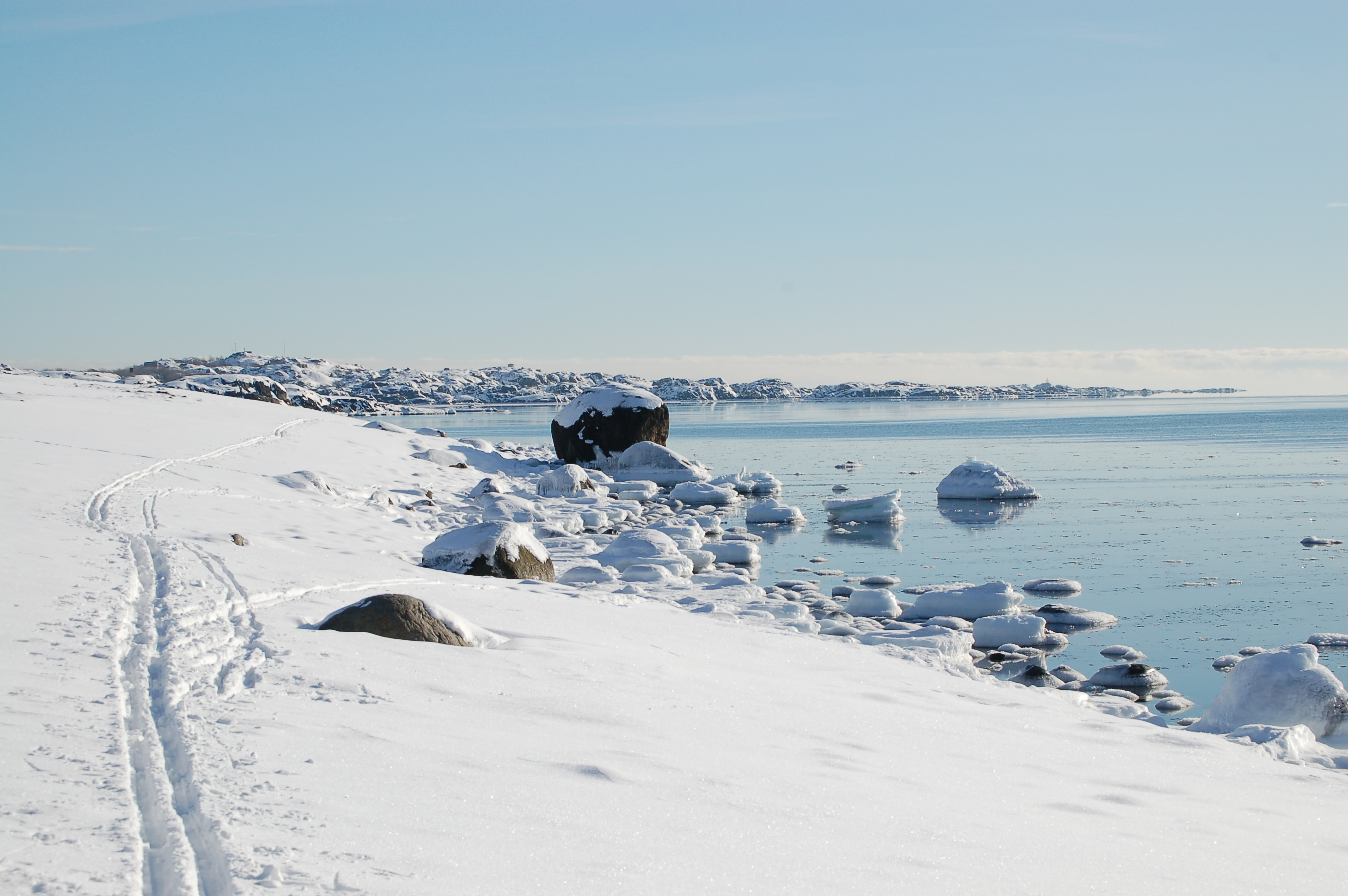

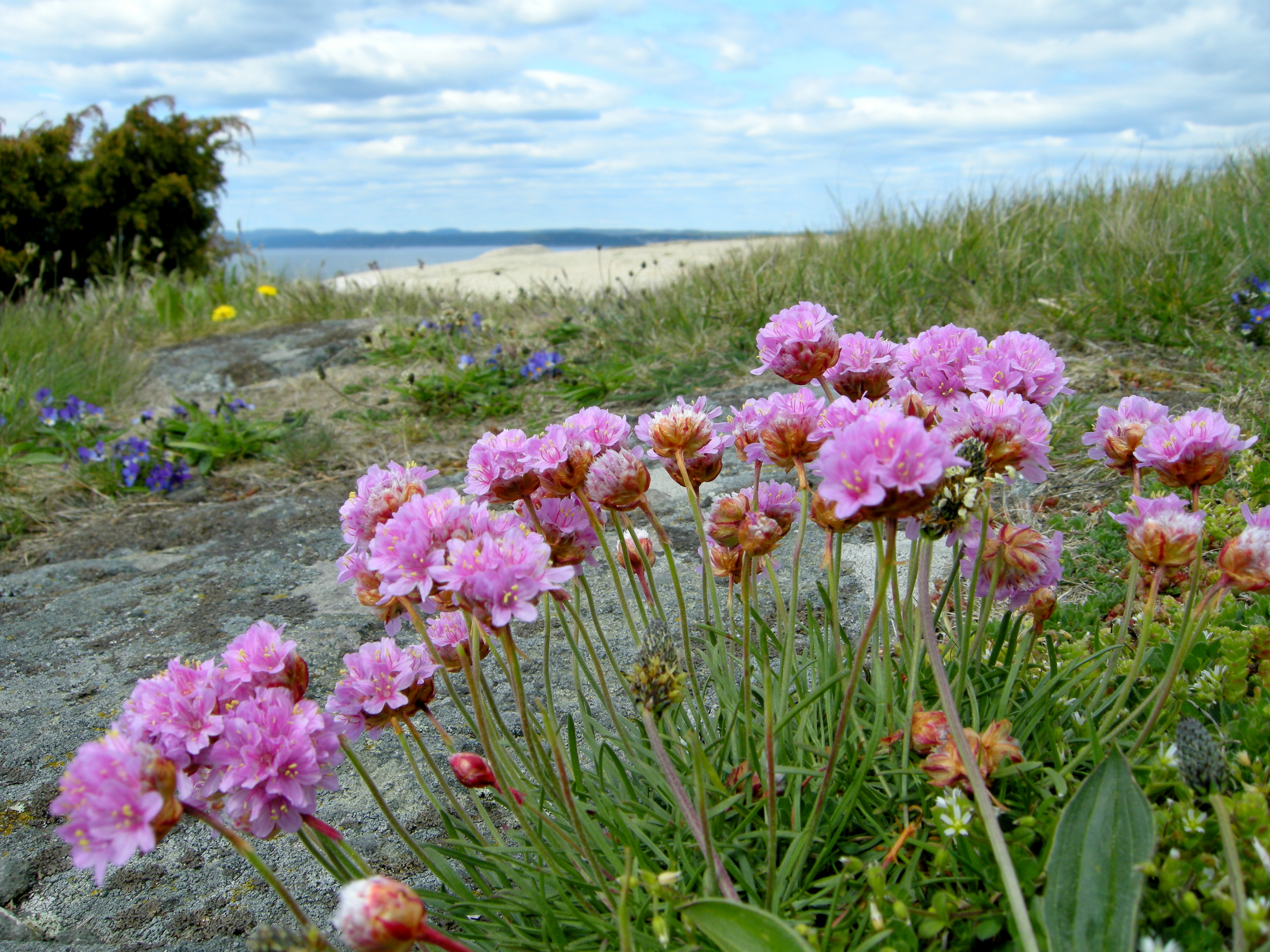

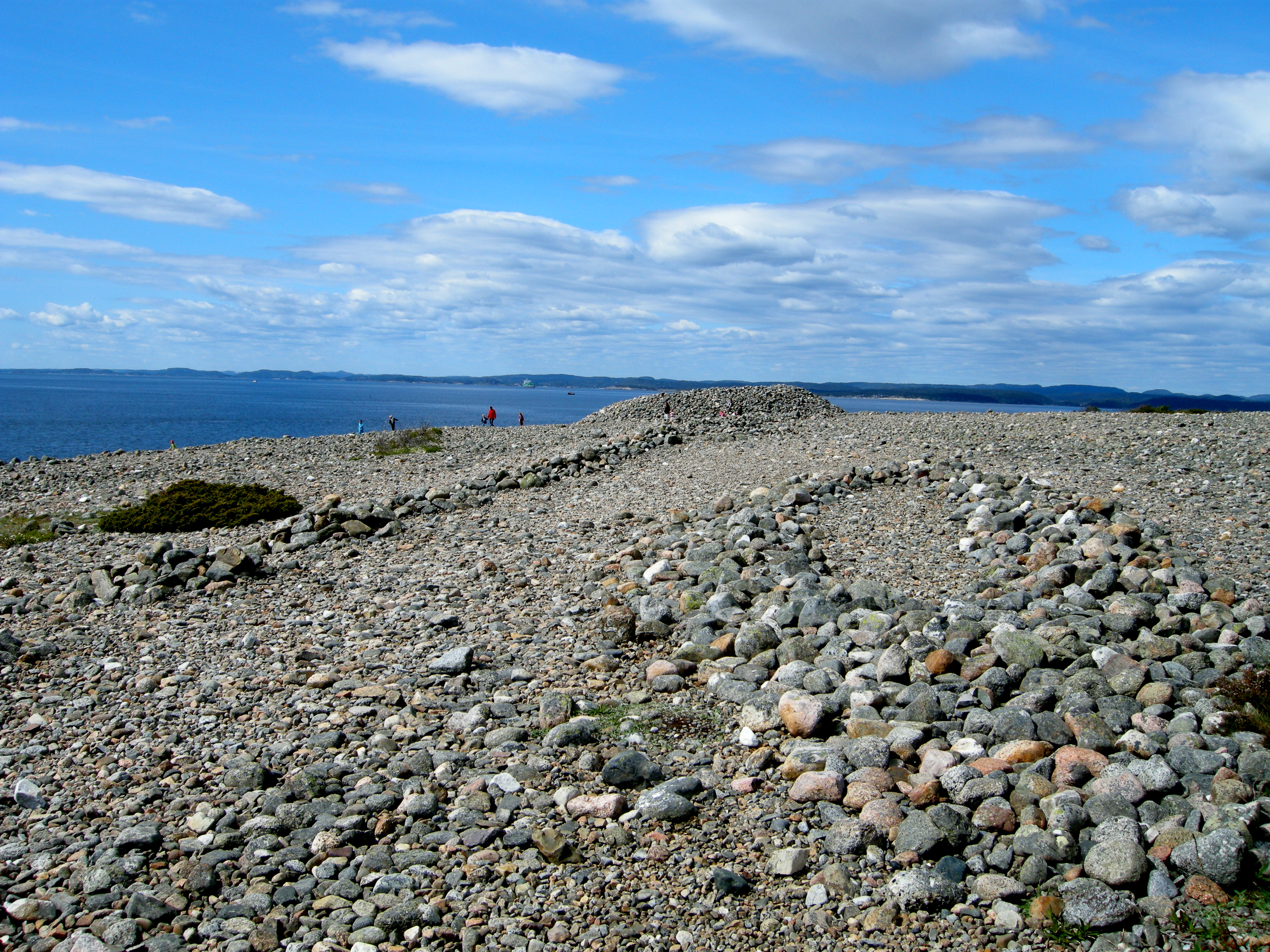
