= Merdø =

Lake in Agder, Norway

- Interactive map of the island

Geography
- Location: Agder, Norway
- Coordinates: 58.42468°N 8.8007°E
- Area: 0.3 km^{2} (0.12 sq mi)
- Length: 1.3 km (0.81 mi)
- Width: 500 m (1600 ft)

Administration
- Norway
- County: Agder
- Municipality: Arendal Municipality

Demographics
- Population: 0 (permanent) (2017)
- Pop. density: 0/km^{2} (0/sq mi)

Merdø is an island in Arendal Municipality in Agder county, Norway. The 0.3-square-kilometre (74-acre) island lies along the Skagerrak coast, near the entrance to the Galtesundet, the main shipping channel leading to the town of Arendal on the mainland. The islands of Tromøya and Hisøy lie to the north and northwest. The small islands of Ærøya and Havsøya lie to the southwest. A part of the island is included in Raet National Park.

== History ==
Graves from the Iron Age exist in two places on the island: Lakseberget and Støttavla. Historical records show a permanent settlement on Merdø dating back to at least the 1300s, and that the settlement occurred in close association with the ever increasing shipping traffic on the Skagerrak. Merdø is marked as an outport on every old Dutch maritime map since 1580, and it was one of the most important ports along the Skagerrak. Merdø harbor is located on the northern shore of the island of Merdø, facing the village of Revesand on the island of Tromøya, about 1 kilometre (0.62 mi) to the north. The inn, customs station, and shipyard on Merdø are mentioned in writings from the 16th century. Later, a school and shops were established on the island.

There is a well-preserved old house which is now the Merdøgaard museum, which belongs to the Agder museum in Arendal. There are two compass designs cut into the mountains with the date 1654. There are also two cannons that were placed on the island in the 1700s for the defense of the town of Arendal that still can be seen.

In the 19th century, fishermen and their families lived on the island along the sea. In 1900, there were 26 inhabited houses with a total of 144 residents. At the beginning of the 20th century, the sailing season ended and there was no longer the same need for the ports. The customs station was closed in 1960, the unloading station was closed in 1971, and the post office was closed in 1975.

== Recreation ==
In the 20th century, Merdø became more and more a holiday and tourist destination. The island gradually depopulated completely, but the houses are still used as summer homes for vacationing families. Merdø also has a large number of cabins that were built during the 20th century. Merdø has several nice swimming areas with good sandy beaches, and it is a popular destination for people in the Arendal area. There are ferries to and from the car-free island every half hour during the summer season. During the low season and all year round, both ferry companies offer taxi boat services.

== Media gallery ==
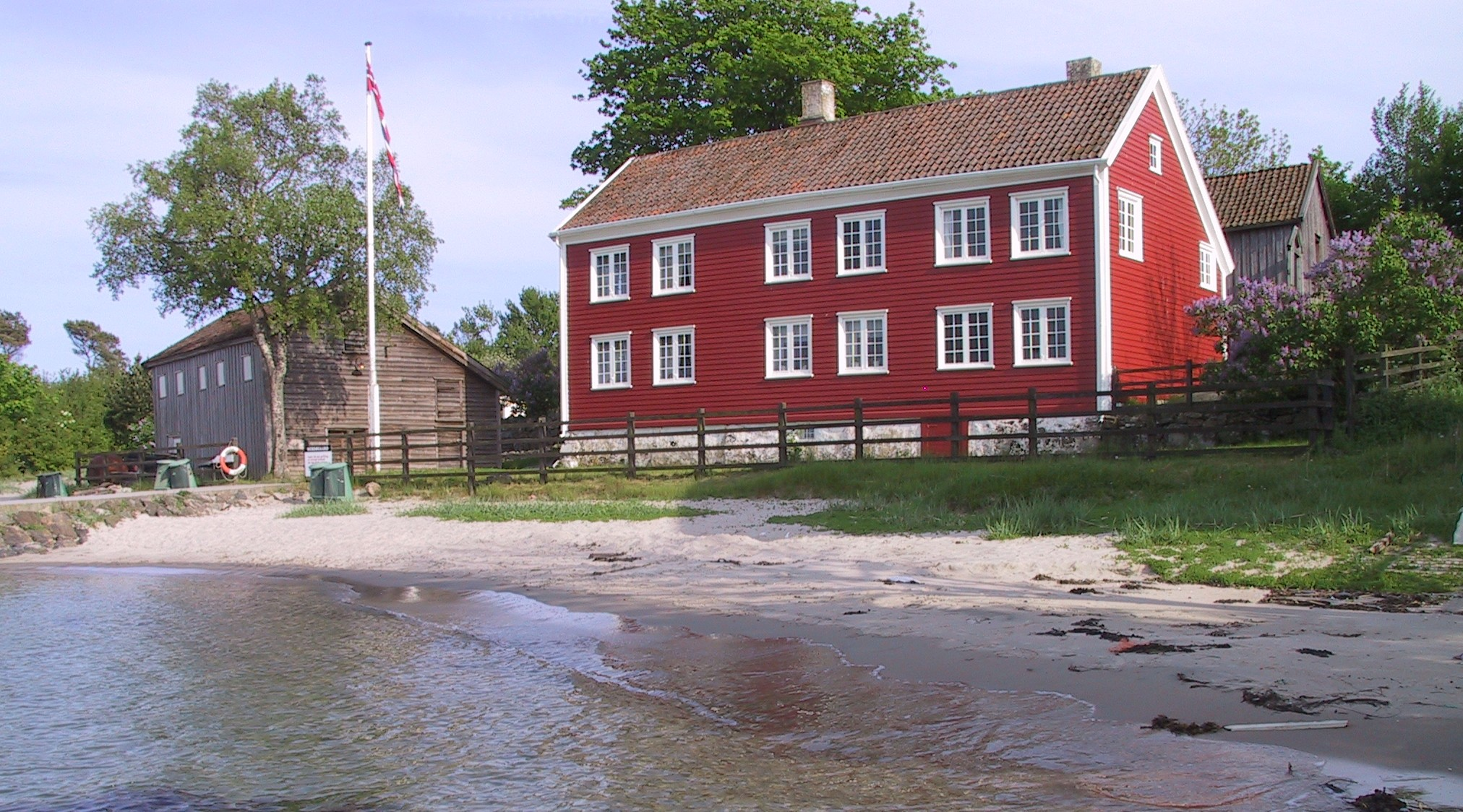
Merdøgaard museum

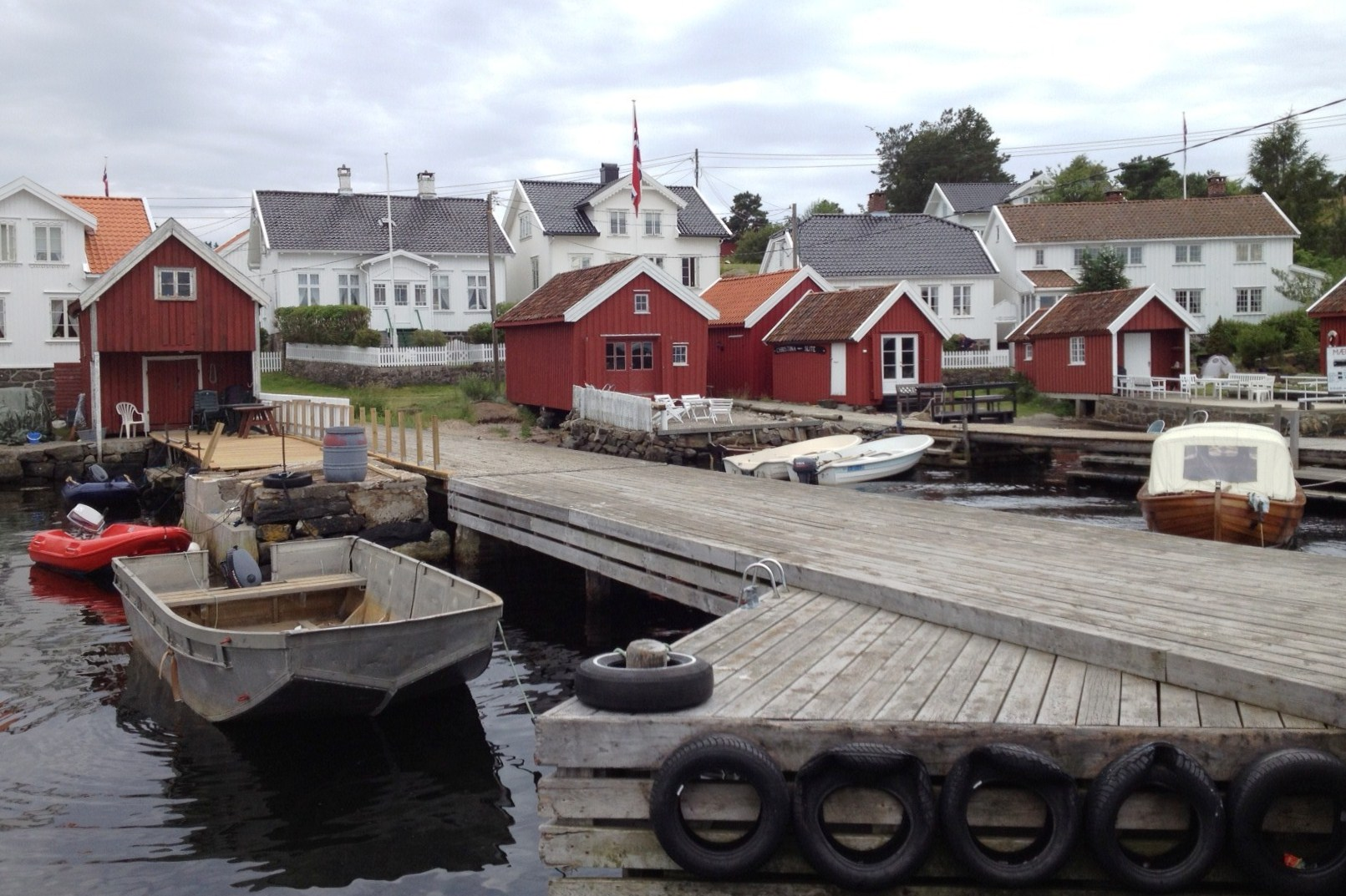
View of the village area on Merdø

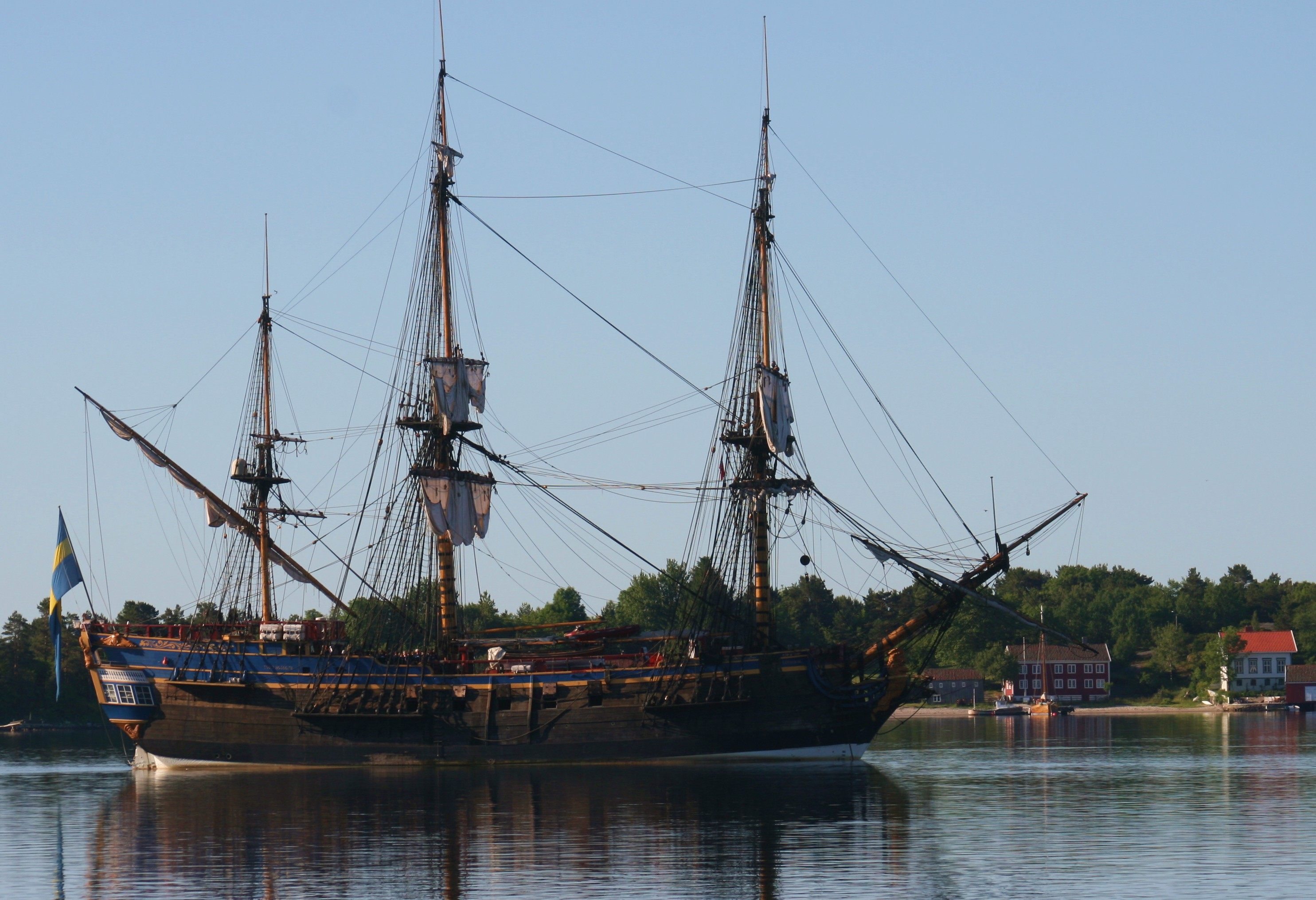
Old sailing ship moored by Merdø

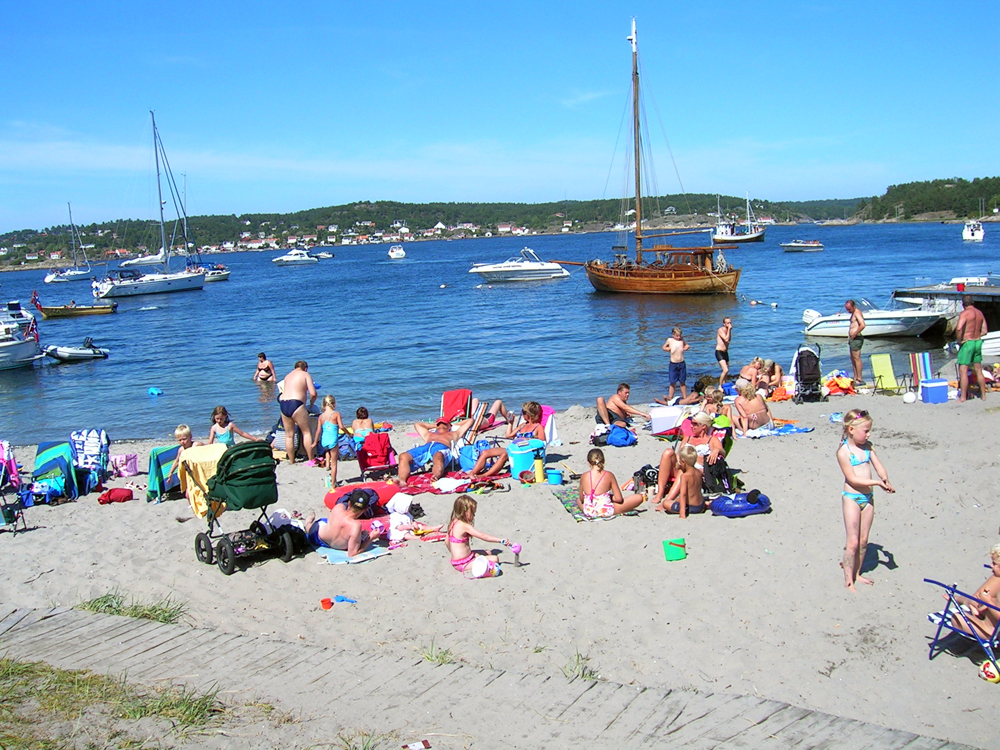
Merdø beach

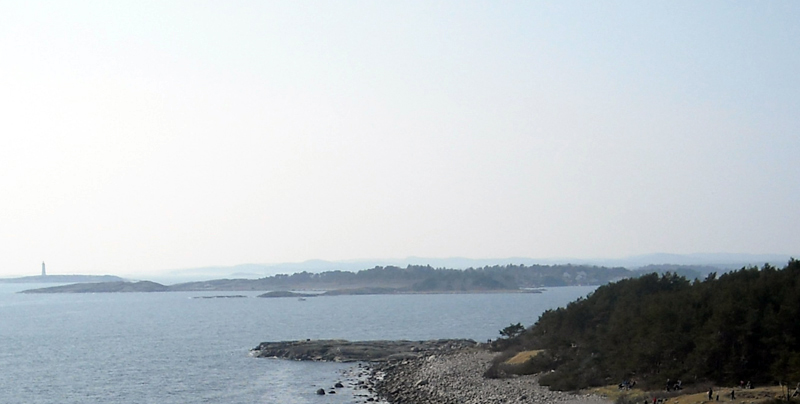
Merdø seen from a nearby island

== See also ==
- List of islands of Norway
- Ferry to Merdø MF Trau
- Ferry to Merdø MF Merdø
