= Nevlunghavn =

Village in Larvik, Norway

Nevlunghavn Nevlunghamn
- Village
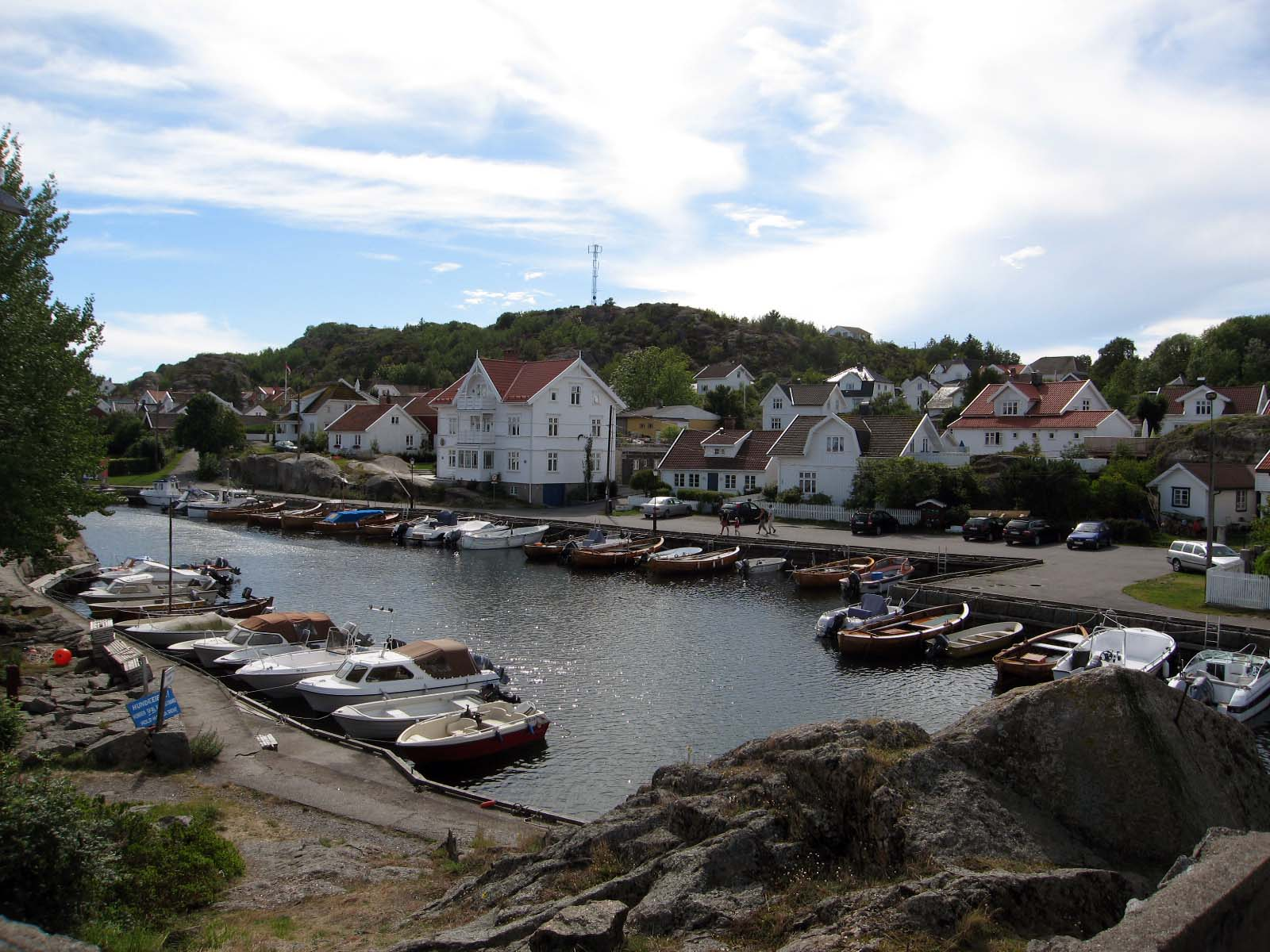
- Nevlunghavn in 2008
- Interactive map of Nevlunghavn
- Coordinates: 58.96741°N 9.86748°E
- Country: Norway
- Region: Eastern Norway
- County: Vestfold
- District: Vestfold
- Municipality: Larvik Municipality
- Elevation: 4 m (13 ft)
- Time zone: UTC+01:00 (CET)
  - Summer (DST): UTC+02:00 (CEST)
- Post Code: 3296 Nevlunghavn

Nevlunghavn is a village in Larvik Municipality in Vestfold county, Norway. The village is located along the Skagerrak coast, about 3 kilometres (1.9 mi) to the south of the village of Helgeroa and about 12 kilometres (7.5 mi) west of the town of Stavern.

Nevlunghavn and neighboring Helgeroa have grown together through conurbation so that Statistics Norway considers them to form one urban area. The statistics about the two villages are no longer tracked separately. The 1.77-square-kilometre (440-acre) urban area has a population (2026) of 2,004 and a population density of 1,132 inhabitants per square kilometre (2,930/sq mi).

Nevlunghavn is the southernmost point in Vestfold County, excluding islands, islets, and skerries. Historically, the village was located in southern Brunlanes Municipality until 1988 when it became part of Larvik Municipality.

== Tourism ==
Nevlunghavn is located in a harbor which lies about 3 kilometres (1.9 mi) south of Helgeroa. As a former pilot station, Nevlunghavn is now a fishing village characterized by its many fishing boats and fishers bringing their catch ashore. It has managed to preserve its original character. The harbor also houses several oceanside seafood restaurants and bars, a yachting harbor, a fishing harbor, and numerous restaurants serving freshly caught seafood such as crab, fish, and shrimp.

The village experiences significant summer tourism. Nearby is Oddanesand, a beach used for swimming, camping and other recreational activities. Gurvika, Oddanesand, and Mølen lie immediately west of Nevlunghavn. While campsites are found at Gurvika and Oddanesand, Mølen is one of Larvik's most popular tourist attractions. From the campsite it is a 90-minute hike to the Bronze Age graves at Mølen. Nevlunghavn has been placed on the United Nations' list of places worthy of preservation.

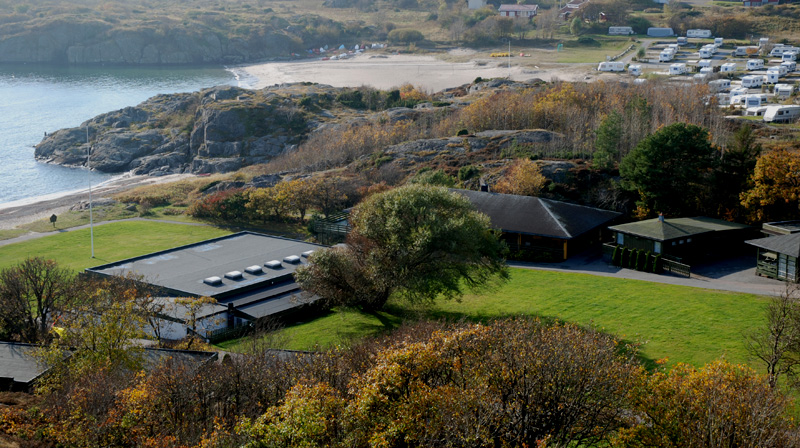
Gurvika and Oddane Sand

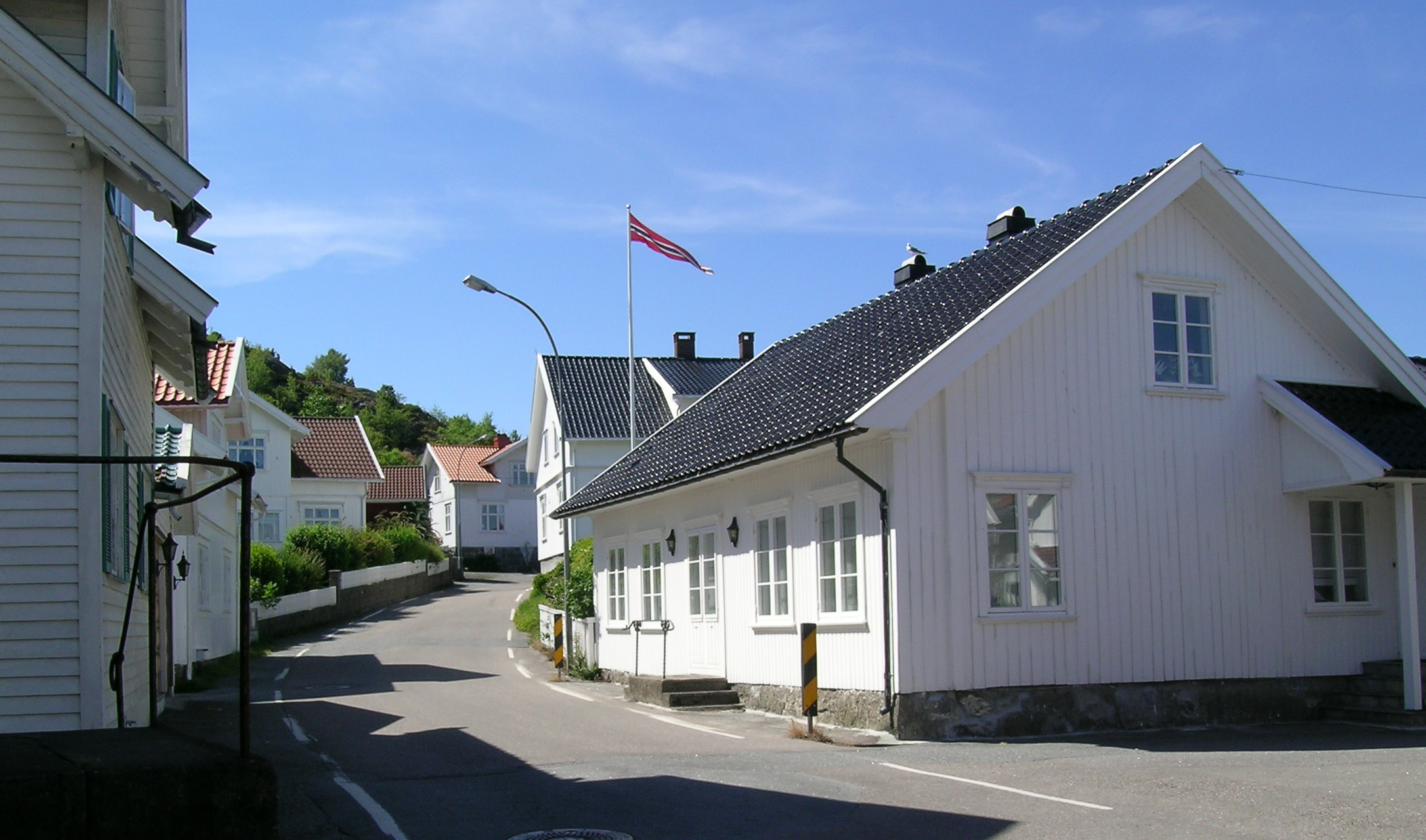
Road through Nevlunghavn

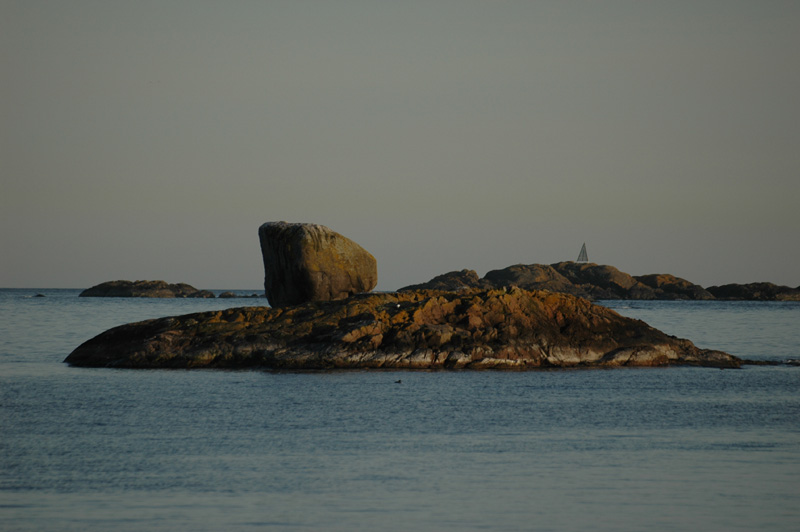
Humlesekken

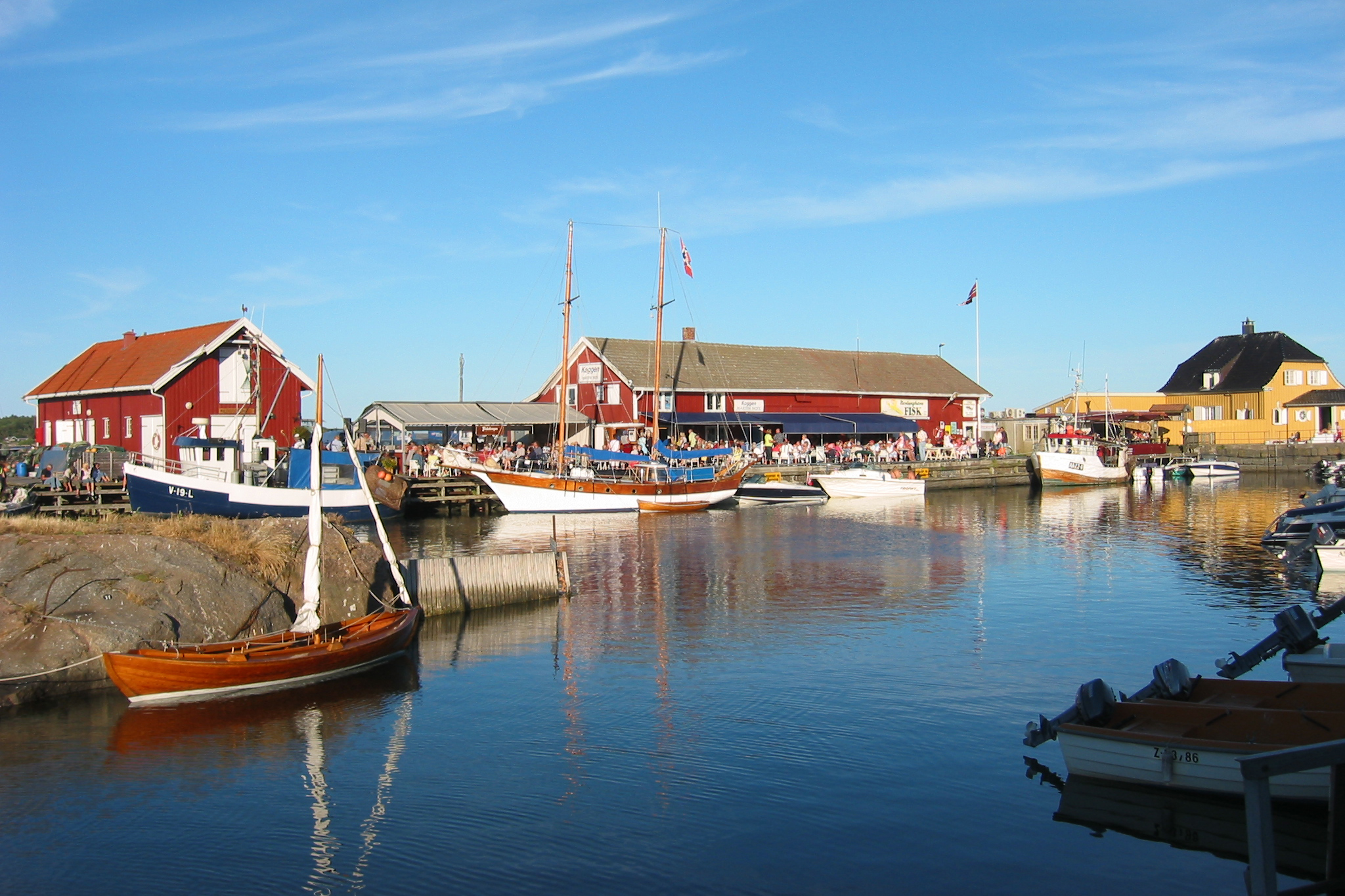
Nevlunghavn harbor

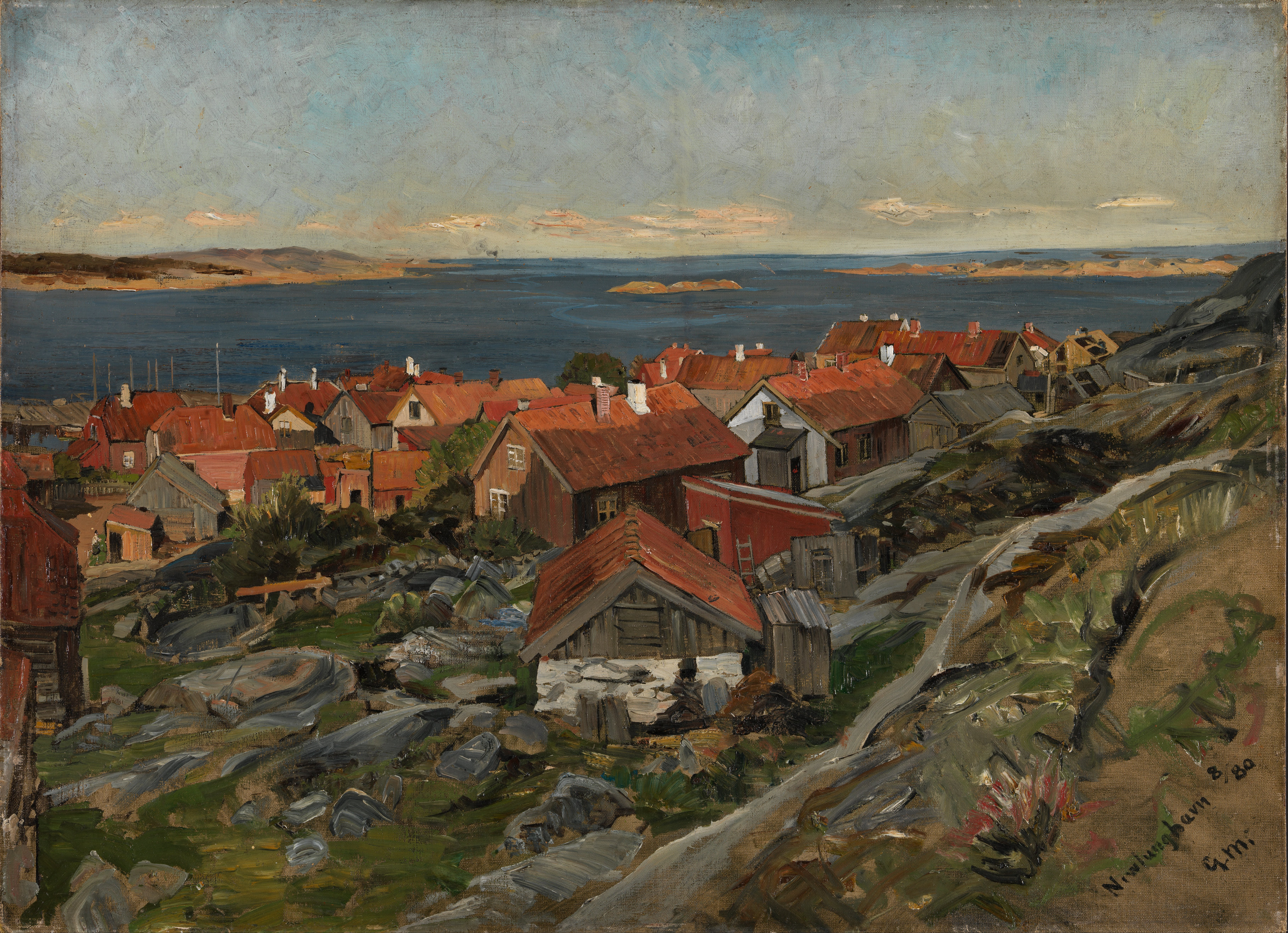
Gerhard Munthe - View of Nevlunghavn (1880)
