= Raet National Park =

National park in Norway

- IUCN category II (national park)
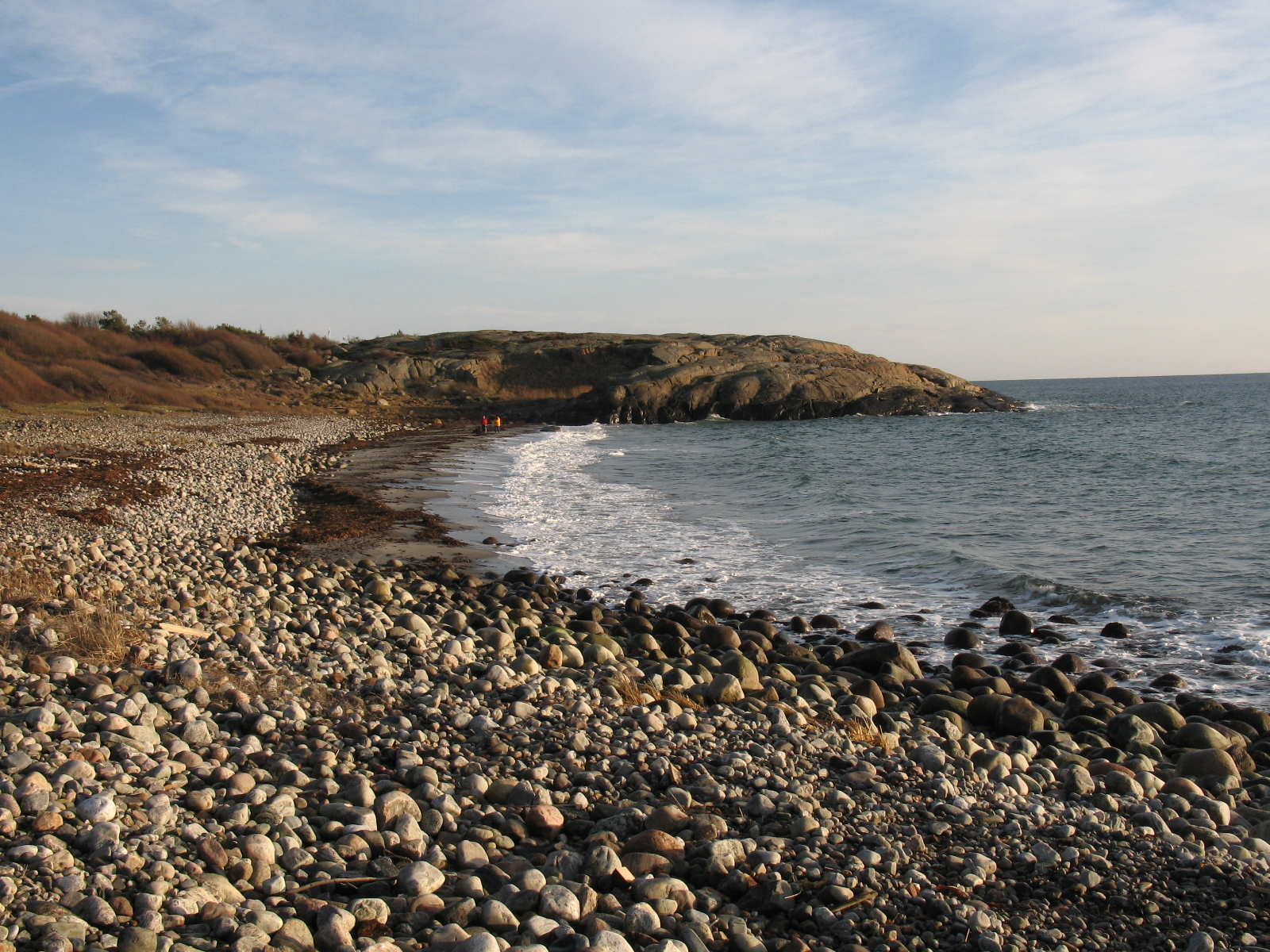
- Interactive map of Raet National Park
- Location: Arendal, Tvedestrand and Grimstad, Norway
- Nearest city: Arendal
- Coordinates: 58.43°N 9.00°E
- Area: 607 km^{2} (234 sq mi), of which 8 km^{2} (3.1 sq mi) is land 599 km^{2} (231 sq mi) is water
- Established: 16 December 2016
- Governing body: Norwegian Environment Agency

Raet National Park (Norwegian: Raet nasjonalpark) is a national park in Arendal Municipality, Tvedestrand Municipality and Grimstad Municipality in Agder county in southeastern Norway. It is mostly a marine park, and includes some islands and coastal areas. Raet covers an area of 607 km^{2} (234 sq mi), of which 599 km^{2} (231 sq mi) is sea and 8 km^{2} (3 sq mi) is land. The park was established on 16 December 2016.

== Raet ==
Raet National Park is named for the long moraine formed by the retreat of a huge glacier about 12,000 years ago, which dumped an enormous quantity of boulders, pebbles, gravel, sand and clay that it had picked up over the centuries. This quaternary geological formation can be traced all over Scandinavia; in Raet National Park it is partly on land and partly under the sea. Pebble beaches are characteristic in areas where the material is graded by heavy seas, but in more protected areas, the moraine forms fine sandy beaches that are attractive to bathers, as occur at Hove on Tromøya and on the island of Merdø. Further inland there is farmland in many places, but these areas are outside the park's boundaries. The coastal towns of Grimstad, Arendal and Tvedestrand offer accommodation and facilities to visitors to the park.

Jerkholmen is a small island in the national park that mainly consists of moraine material. A very special place in Raet National Park is the small pebble island of Måen (130 m long) east of Tromøy. Here the top of the ridge is so far up above the sea surface that it forms a small, unstable island of pebbles. Many ships have sunk in this area, which is known as a ships' graveyard. Raet continues east from Raet National Park to Jomfruland National Park in Telemark and on to Mølen in Vestfold.

== Marine area ==
The sea in this area is shallow and exposed to currents which move westwards along the coast. The seabed has areas of rock and others of sand and gravel, particularly in the more sheltered areas. In rocky areas there are forests of kelp and a wide variety of fish and invertebrates but in more protected locations, eelgrasses dominate.

== Land area ==
The coastal land area included in the park includes rocky, shingly and sandy shores and a number of wetland habitats, including the brackish water of the Nidelva delta. There is rich bird life in the park, including both resident species and migratory birds travelling between their winter quarters and their breeding grounds.
