= Bøkeskogen =

Protected area in Norway

Coordinates: 59°03′30″N 10°01′26″E

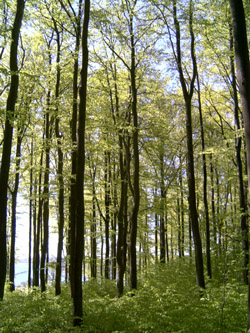
Bøkeskogen in May.

Bøkeskogen (lit. 'The Beech Tree Forest') stretches inwards along Farris Lake in Larvik Municipality in Vestfold county, Norway. It is an archeological area which is home to between 83, 90, and 100 burial mounds. It contains Vestfold County's largest burial grounds from the Pre-Roman Iron Age. Besides being Vestfold's largest grave site, Bøkeskogen is considered one of Norway's most accessible remains from the Viking Age.

Bøkeskogen is 0.3 square kilometres (74 acres) and it is home to miles of hiking trails. Bøkeskogen is home to one of Norway's largest burial mounds from the Iron Age. The highest point is known as “The Bellevue”, which offers panoramic views of Farris Lake.

It was Norway's first public area, given in 1884 by manor house owner Treschow-Fritzøe to the residents of Larvik. The area was protected by the Norwegian Nature Diversity Act in 1980.
