= Helgeroa =

Village in Larvik, Norway

- Village
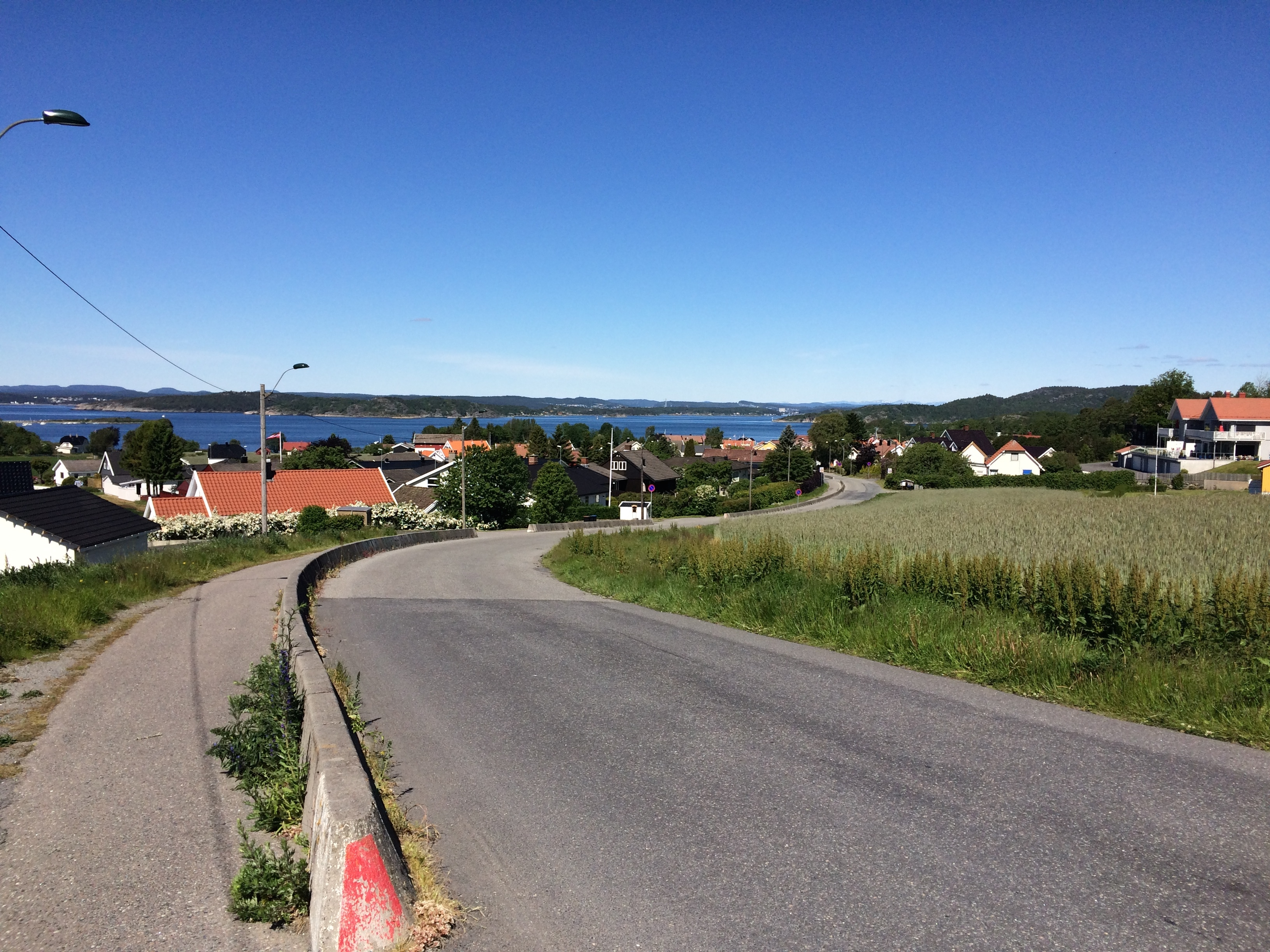
- View of the village
- Interactive map of Helgeroa
- Coordinates: 58.99389°N 9.86279°E
- Country: Norway
- Region: Eastern Norway
- County: Vestfold
- District: Vestfold
- Municipality: Larvik Municipality
- Elevation: 14 m (46 ft)
- Time zone: UTC+01:00 (CET)
  - Summer (DST): UTC+02:00 (CEST)
- Post Code: 3295 Helgeroa

Helgeroa is a village in Larvik Municipality in Vestfold county, Norway. The village is located along the Helgerofjorden at the Skagerrak coast in southwestern Vestfold. It is located about 3 kilometres (1.9 mi) to the north of the village of Nevlunghavn and about 12 kilometres (7.5 mi) southwest of the town of Larvik.

Nevlunghavn and neighboring Helgeroa have grown together through conurbation so that Statistics Norway considers them to form one urban area. The statistics about the two villages are no longer tracked separately. The 1.77-square-kilometre (440-acre) urban area has a population (2026) of 2,004 and a population density of 1,132 inhabitants per square kilometre (2,930/sq mi).

== History ==
Helgeroa functioned as a traffic point between Eastern Norway and Southern Norway for hundreds of years. A toll was charged at Helgeroa since 1639. The need for lodging increased with the surging ship traffic, and Helgeroa's first inn was established in the 1660s. King Christian V stayed at the inn during a visit to Helgeroa in year 1685. Helgeroa is now a popular tourist destination, and large numbers of campgrounds can be found in the immediate nearby area. It is home to a marina, guest harbor, and a harbor for ferries operating on the Langesundsfjord. At the tip of the pier is the 8-metre (26 ft) tall Nesjar Monument.

Helgeroa was the main settlement in the old Brunlanes Municipality which existed from 1838 until 1988. The village was important, but it was not the administrative centre of Brunlanes, as this was located at Tanum and later in the town of Larvik. Despite being permanent home to just a few hundred households, Helgeroa receives thousands of visitors every summer. The Nesjar Monument is located in the village and was erected on the 1000th anniversary for the Battle of Nesjar, which took place by Helgeroa in year 1026.

== Geography ==
Helgeroa lies in a sheltered harbor on the western shore of the Oslofjord. Helgeroa was formerly a centre for local commercial traffic across the Langesundsfjord. Today, it is mostly a summer community where tourists often arrive by yachts. All traffic to the islands in the Langesundsfjord, of which some are populated throughout the year, departs from Helgeroa Harbor. The harbor was previously a pilot station, but is now housing a large and well-equipped yachting harbor, as well as oceanside seafood restaurants and bars. It has a shopping center located on the main road.
