= Sandefjord Municipality =

Municipality in Vestfold, Norway

Sandefjord Municipality Sandefjord kommune
- Municipality
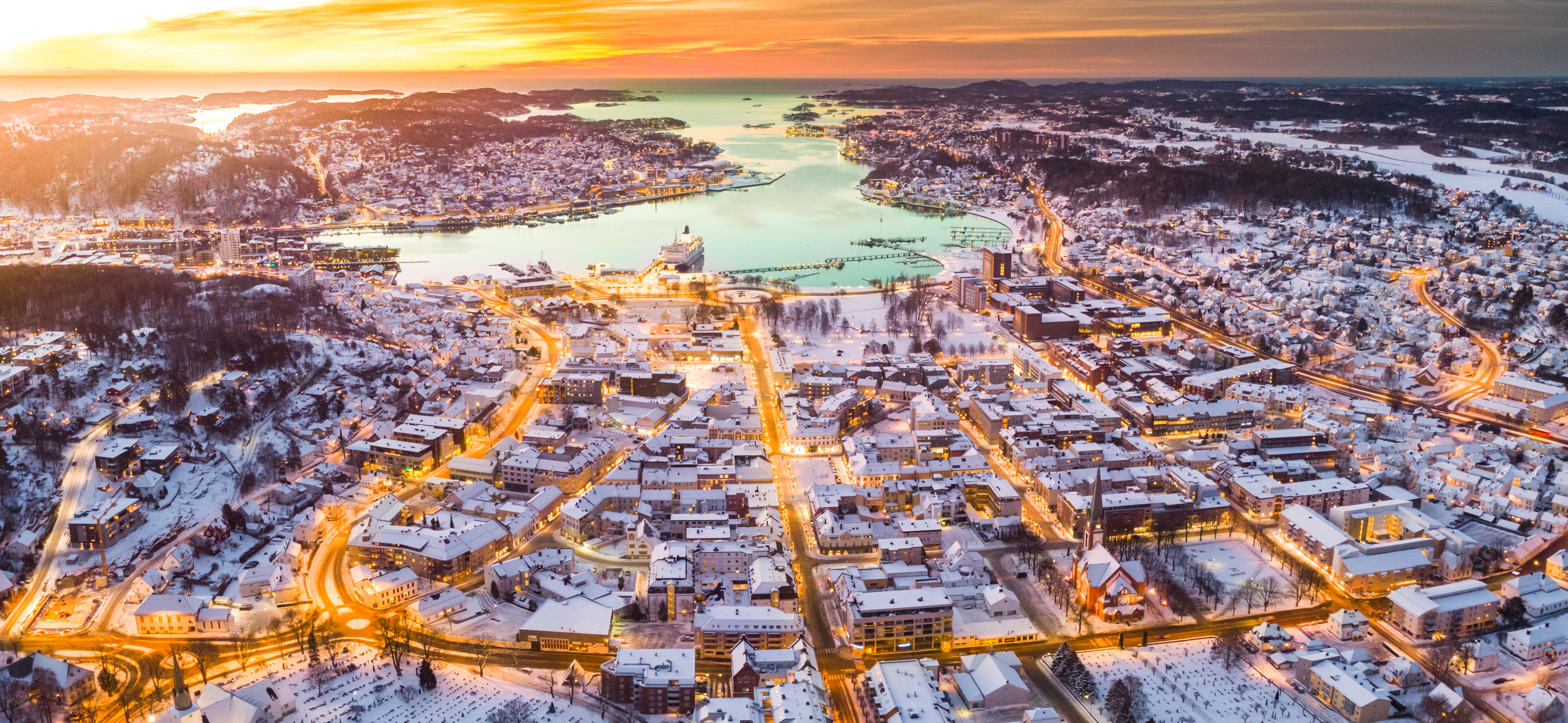
- Sandefjord town centre during winter, 2019

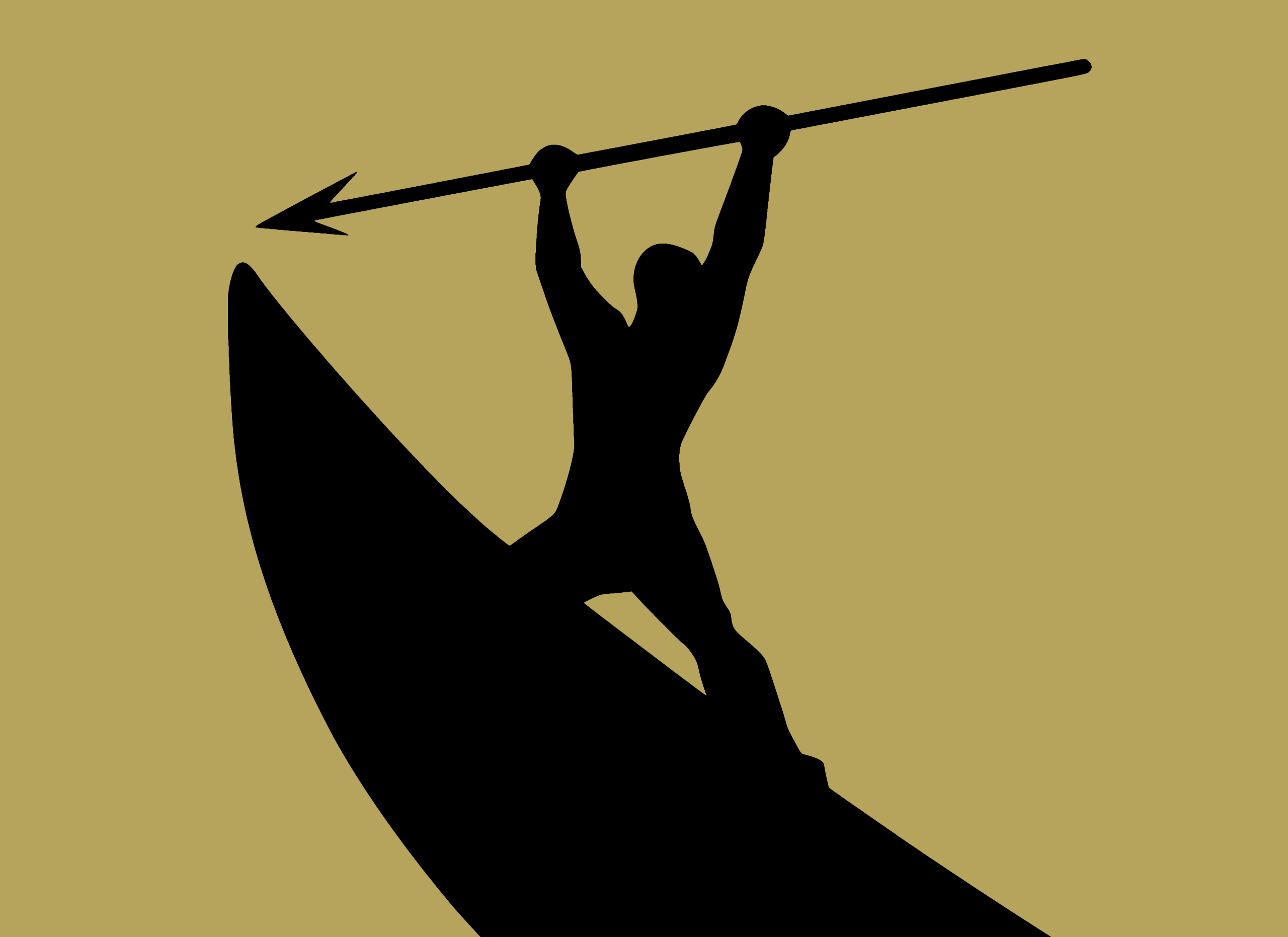
- Flag Coat of arms

- Vestfold within Norway

- Sandefjord within Vestfold
- Coordinates: 59°7′50″N 10°13′00″E
- Country: Norway
- County: Vestfold
- Established: 1 Jan 1838
  - Created as: Formannskapsdistrikt
- Administrative centre: Sandefjord

Government
  - Mayor (2003): Bjørn Ole Gleditsch (H)

Area
  - Total: 422.25 km^{2} (163.03 sq mi)
  - Land: 414.26 km^{2} (159.95 sq mi)
  - Water: 7.99 km^{2} (3.08 sq mi) 1.9%
  - Rank: #232 in Norway
- Highest elevation (Brånafjell): 399.34 m (1,310.2 ft)

Population (2026)
  - Total: 67,062
  - Rank: #13 in Norway
  - Density: 161.9/km^{2} (419/sq mi)
  - Change (10 years): ▲ +5.8%
- Demonym: Sandefjording

Official language
  - Norwegian form: Bokmål
- Time zone: UTC+01:00 (CET)
  - Summer (DST): UTC+02:00 (CEST)
- ISO 3166 code: NO-3907
- Website: Official website

Sandefjord (Norwegian pronunciation: [ˈsɑ̂nːəfjuːr]; locally [ˈsɑ̂nːəfjøːɽ]) is a municipality in Vestfold county, Norway. It is located in the traditional district of Vestfold. The administrative centre of the municipality is the city of Sandefjord. Other population centres in Sandefjord include Andebu, Fevang, Fokserød, Fossnes, Freberg, Hafallen, Helgerød, Himberg, Høyjord, Kodal, Lahelle, Melsomvik, Råstad, Solløkka, Stokke, Storevar, Strand, and Unneberg.

The 422.25-square-kilometre (163.03 sq mi) municipality is the 232nd largest by area out of the 357 municipalities in Norway. Sandefjord Municipality is the most populous municipality in Vestfold county and the 13th most populous municipality in Norway, with a population (2026) of 67,062. The municipality's population density is 161.9 inhabitants per square kilometre (419/sq mi) and its population has increased by 5.8% over the previous 10-year period.

Sandefjord Municipality is known for its rich Viking history and the prosperous whaling industry, which made the city of Sandefjord the richest city in Norway. Today, it has built up the third-largest merchant fleet in Norway. Sandefjord Museum is the only museum in Europe dedicated to whaling, and is home to Gokstad Mound where the 9th-century Gokstad Ship was discovered.

Sandefjord has numerous nicknames, including the whaling "capital" of Norway or as the undisputed summer city of Norway. Sandefjord is also known as the "whaling capital of the world". It has also been dubbed the "Bathing City" (Badebyen), due to its many beaches and former resort spas. It is still considered a resort town, due to high numbers of visitors during summer months.

Sandefjord has become a transportation hub, home of Torp Airport, one of Norway's largest airports. Daily ferry connections to Sweden are provided by Color Line from the city harbor. European Route E18, one of Norway's main north–south highways, traverses the municipality.

Sandefjord is a stronghold for the Conservative Party; the Conservative coalition received over 70 percent of votes cast in 2011. Current mayor is Bjørn Ole Gleditsch from the Conservative Party, who has been mayor since 2004.

== General information ==
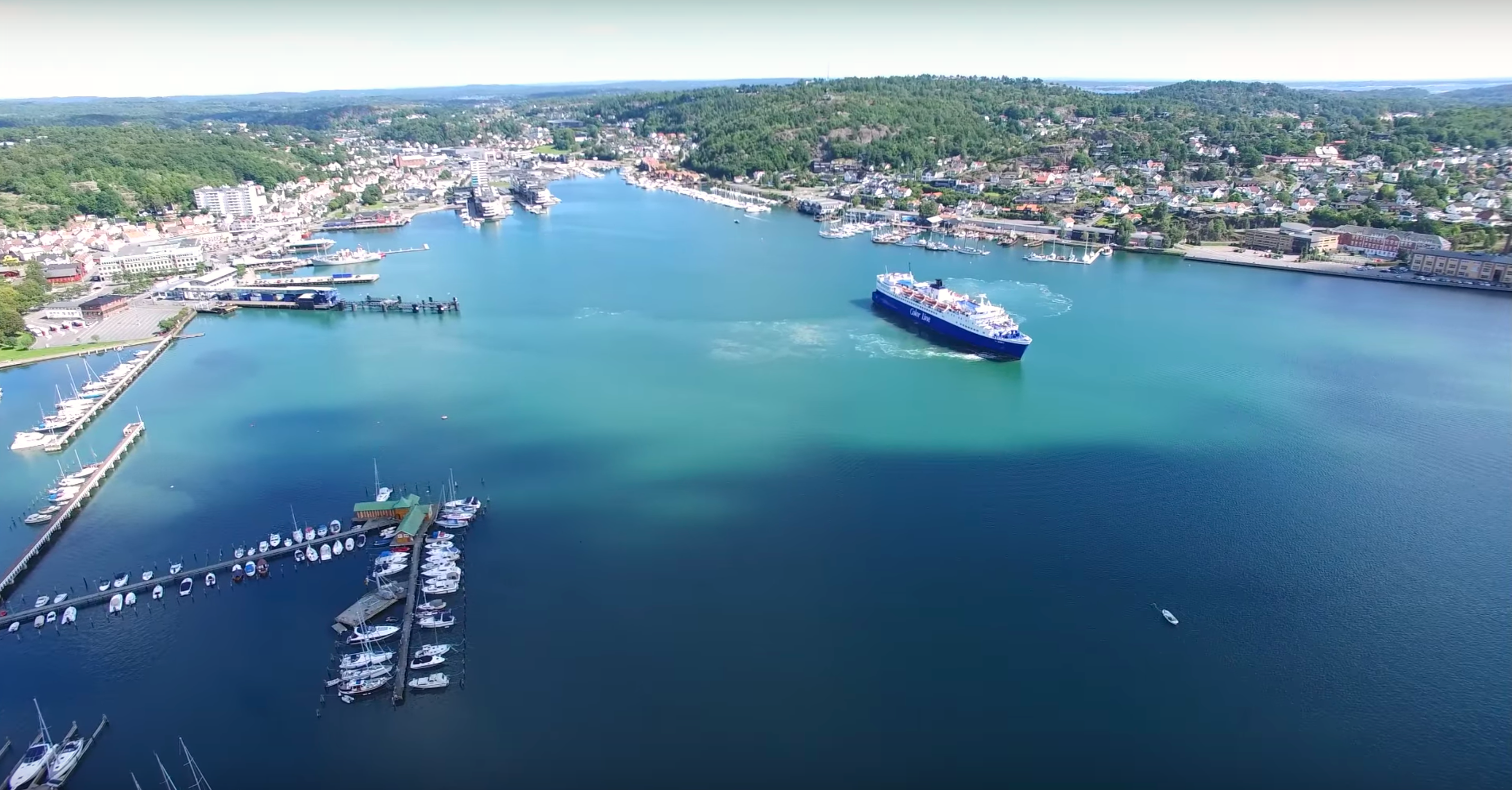
The name originally belonged to the main fjord, now called the Sandefjordsfjord.

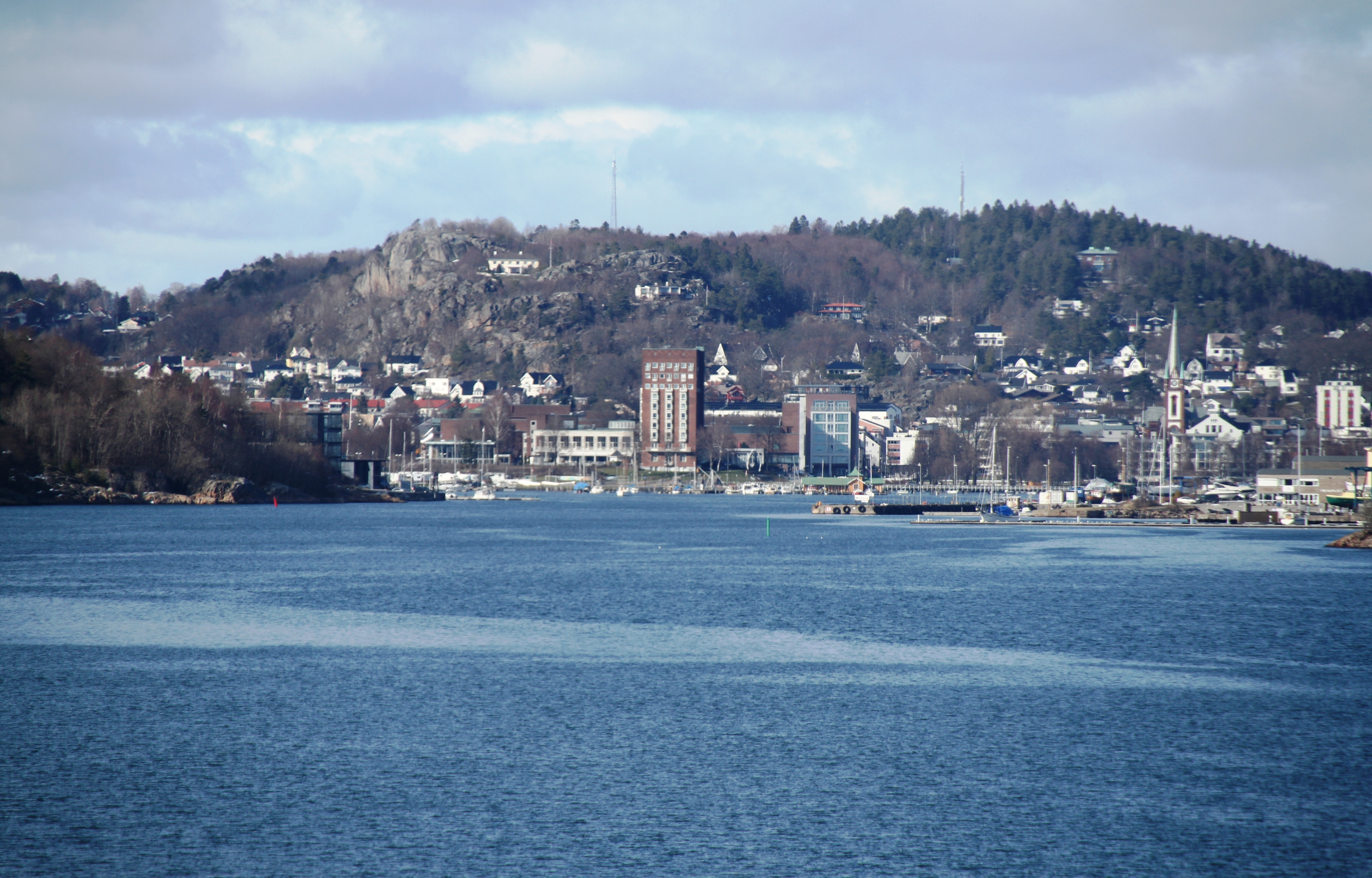
Seaside entry to Sandefjord

=== Administrative history ===
The formannskapsdistrikt law of 1837 created a system of local government in Norway by establishing each town (ladested or kjøpstad) and each Church of Norway prestegjeld as a civil municipality. On 1 January 1838, the ladested of Sandefjord was established as Sandefjord Municipality. In 1845, the ladested of Sandefjord was designated as a kjøpstad (giving it full market town rights).

On 1 January 1889, a part of the neighboring Sandeherred Municipality (population: 318) was transferred into Sandefjord Municipality. In 1931, an area of the neighboring Sandar Municipality (population: 66) was transferred into Sandefjord Municipality. In 1950, another area of the neighboring Sandar Municipality (population: 226) was transferred into Sandefjord Municipality.

During the 1960s, there were many municipal mergers across Norway due to the work of the Schei Committee. On 1 January 1968, Sandar Municipality (population: 24,898) was dissolved and merged with Sandefjord Municipality (population: 6,242) to form a much larger Sandefjord Municipality.

From 2017-2020, there were many municipal and county mergers across Norway due to the work of the Solberg cabinet. The first of these mergers took place on 1 January 2017 when the following areas were merged to form an enlarged Sandefjord Municipality:

- all of Sandefjord Municipality (population: 45,820)
- all of Andebu Municipality (population: 5,937)
- all of Stokke Municipality (population: 11,657)

Historically, this municipality was part of Vestfold county. On 1 January 2020, the municipality became a part of the newly-formed Vestfold og Telemark county (after Telemark and Vestfold counties were merged). The merger was shortlived, and on 1 January 2024, the merger was undone and this municipality became part of Vestfold county once again.

=== Etymology ===
The name Sandefjord was first mentioned in chapter 169 of Sverris saga from the year 1200. It was then referring to the fjord which is now known as Sandefjordsfjord. The municipality (originally the city of Sandefjord) is named after the local fjord, now called Sandefjordsfjorden since the city of Sandefjord grew up at the head of the fjord. The first element of the name comes from the old Sande farm (Old Norse: Sandar). The old farm name is the plural form of sandr which means "sand" or "sandbanks". The last element comes from the word fjǫrðr which means "fjord".

=== Coat of arms ===
Sandefjord Municipality has had two coats of arms over the course of its history.

The original coat of arms was granted on 9 May 1914 and they were in use until 1 January 2017. The official blazon is "Or, a Viking ship sable with a sail paly gules and argent under a whale embowed". This means the arms have a field (background) has a tincture of Or which means it is commonly colored yellow, but if it is made out of metal, then gold is used. The arms usually showed a mural crown over the shield. The charge is a Viking ship with a red and white striped sail with an arched whale over the top. The Viking ship symbolizes the famous Gokstad ship, which was found in Sandefjord in 1880, one of the best preserved Viking ships known. The whale symbolizes that in the late 19th and early 20th century, Sandefjord was a main home port for whalers operating in the southern oceans. The arms were designed by Andreas Bloch. The municipal flag has the same design as the coat of arms.

The current coat of arms was approved for use starting on 1 January 2017, after the merger of Andebu Municipality, Stokke Municipality, and Sandefjord Municipality. The official blazon is "Or, a whaler with raised harpoon on a boat issuant from the base sable" (Norwegian: I gull i en oppvoksende båt en hvalfanger med hevet harpun, alt i svart). This means the arms have a field (background) has a tincture of Or which means it is commonly colored yellow, but if it is made out of metal, then gold is used. The charge is a whaler with a harpoon standing on a boat that is coming out of the base of the shield. The arms show part of a local whale hunting monument to symbolize the historical importance of whaling. The arms were designed by Erik Raastad from Sandefjord who called the design "courage and strength". There were also minor modification done by the heraldic expert Jan Eide from Oslo. The municipal flag has the same design as the coat of arms.

Coats of arms of Sandefjord

Current coat of arms
(1 Jan 2017–present)

Former coat of arms
(9 May 1914–31 Dec 2016)

== History ==
=== Viking history ===
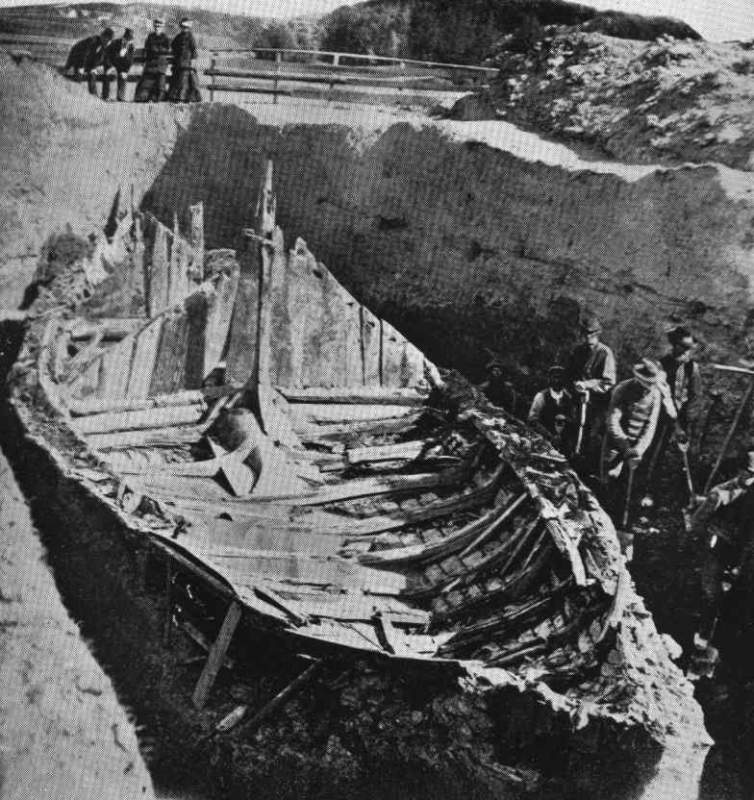
The 9th century Gokstad Ship was discovered in Sandefjord.

Sandefjord has been inhabited for thousands of years. Excavations indicate that people have inhabited Sandefjord for around 3,000 years. Rock carvings at Haugen farm by Istrehågan in Jåberg are dated to 1,500–500 BCE. Haugen farm is home to Vestfold county's largest petroglyph site. In 1961–1962, 78 rock carvings were discovered at the site. They consist of ships, spiral figures, circular hollows, and much more.

The Vikings lived in Sandefjord and surrounding areas about 1,000 years ago, and numerous Viking artifacts and monuments can be found in Sandefjord. One of the most important remains from the Viking Age was found at the grave site Gokstadhaugen (Gokstad Mound) in Sandefjord. The Gokstad ship was excavated by Nicolay Nicolaysen and is now in the Viking Ship Museum in Oslo. The Viking, an exact replica of the Gokstad ship, crossed the Atlantic Ocean from Bergen to be exhibited at the World's Columbian Exposition in Chicago in 1893. A replica of the Gokstad ship, called Gaia, currently has Sandefjord as home port. Other known replicas include the Munin, (a half scale replica) located in Vancouver, Canada.

The Gokstad Ship, Norway's largest preserved Viking ship, was discovered during an excavation at Gokstad Mound in 1880. The Vikings first settled here due to its speedy route from Sandefjord and along the coast. Viking settlements and grave sites have been discovered in Sandefjord.

Sandefjord functioned as a seaport defined by the twin industries of shipping and shipbuilding throughout the 1600s and 1700s. It was formally recognized as a market town (kjøpstad) by King Oscar in 1845. Its population at the time was 749 residents.

=== Health resort ===
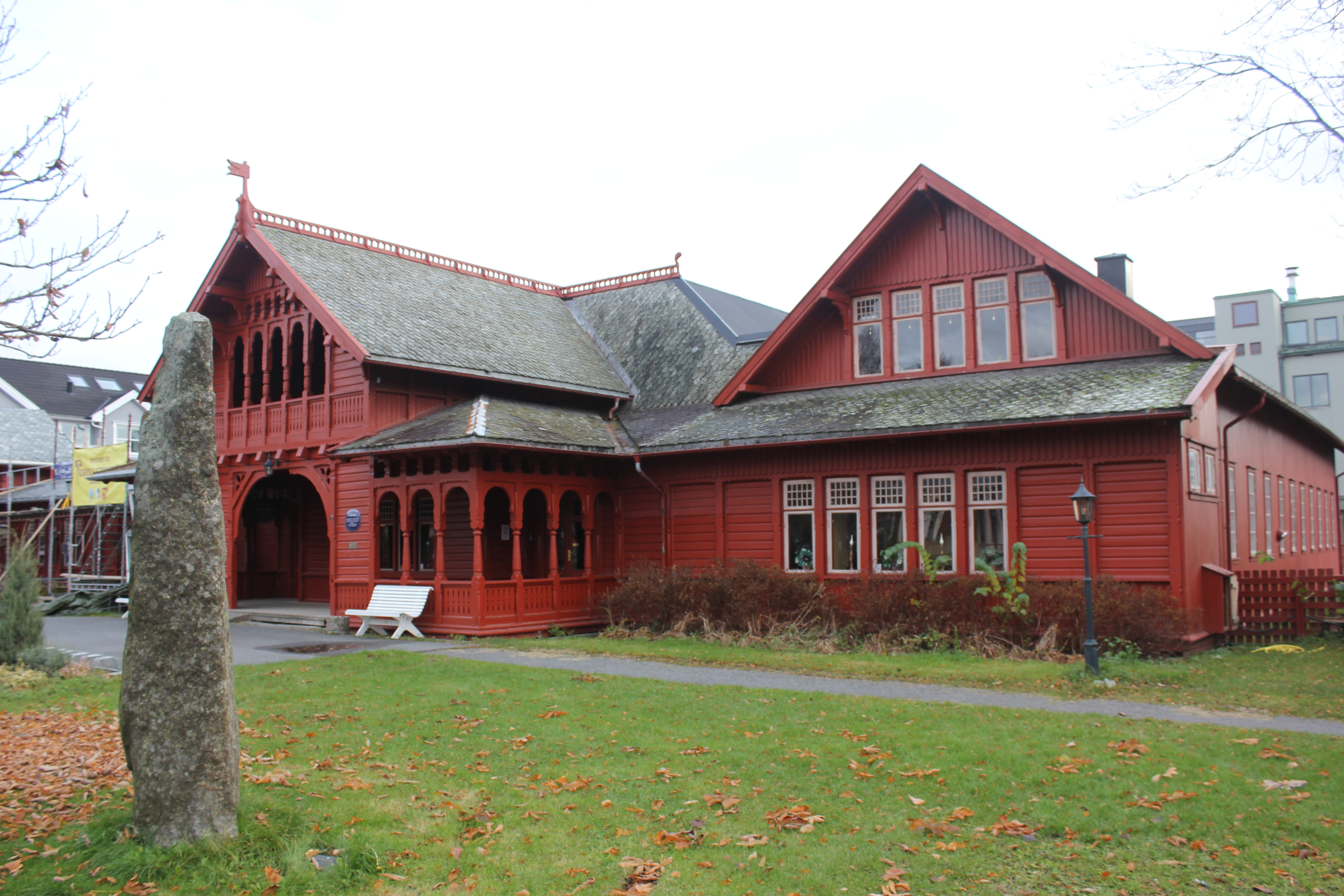
Kurbadet is housed in one of the largest wooden buildings in the Nordics.

The city of Sandefjord became known as a world-renowned health resort destination between 1837 and 1939. Royalty and Prime Ministers from throughout Europe visited the town for its spas in the late 1800s. It gained its reputation as a health and pleasure community when Sandefjord sulfur spa and resort (Sandefjord Kurbad) was established in 1837. It was the first spa in town and functioned as a medical institution focusing on the treatment of symptoms for rheumatic diseases. The original bathhouse has been restored and is now a culture house by the city center. It was one of Europe's most visited baths until its closure in 1939.

Around 50,000 people, mostly Norwegians, visited the bath from 1837 to 1939. A majority of spa visitors were from Norway, but international guests from Germany, Britain, and the United States also visited the spas of Sandefjord. Today the bath's building, Kurbadet, has been restored and hosts cultural events and various annual activities.

=== Town fires ===
Sandefjord has experienced numerous town fires, including a town fire in 1800 which led to most of the town burning down and subsequently having to be rebuilt. An additional fire in 1900 destroyed 56 houses and caused major damage. Sandefjord's ships and the shipping industry remained untouched from the major fire of March 1900. The fire, which started on the night before 16 March 1900, led to the entire city center burning down, including important business offices. Both newspapers in town, Sandefjords Blad and Vestfold, saw their offices burnt down. Six jewelry stores, three watchmakers, eight grocery stores, and a variety of other shops were destroyed. The fire started in the factory Nordmannen. The fire caused the loss of 51 buildings for a total value of 1.5 million kr in addition to 1 million kr in loss of store items. Sandefjord Church (built in 1872) also burnt down during the town fire of 1900.

A new town fire on 27–28 March 1915 led to the death of two people and destroyed seven farms. Large parts of the street Storgata were also destroyed.

=== Whaling and ships ===
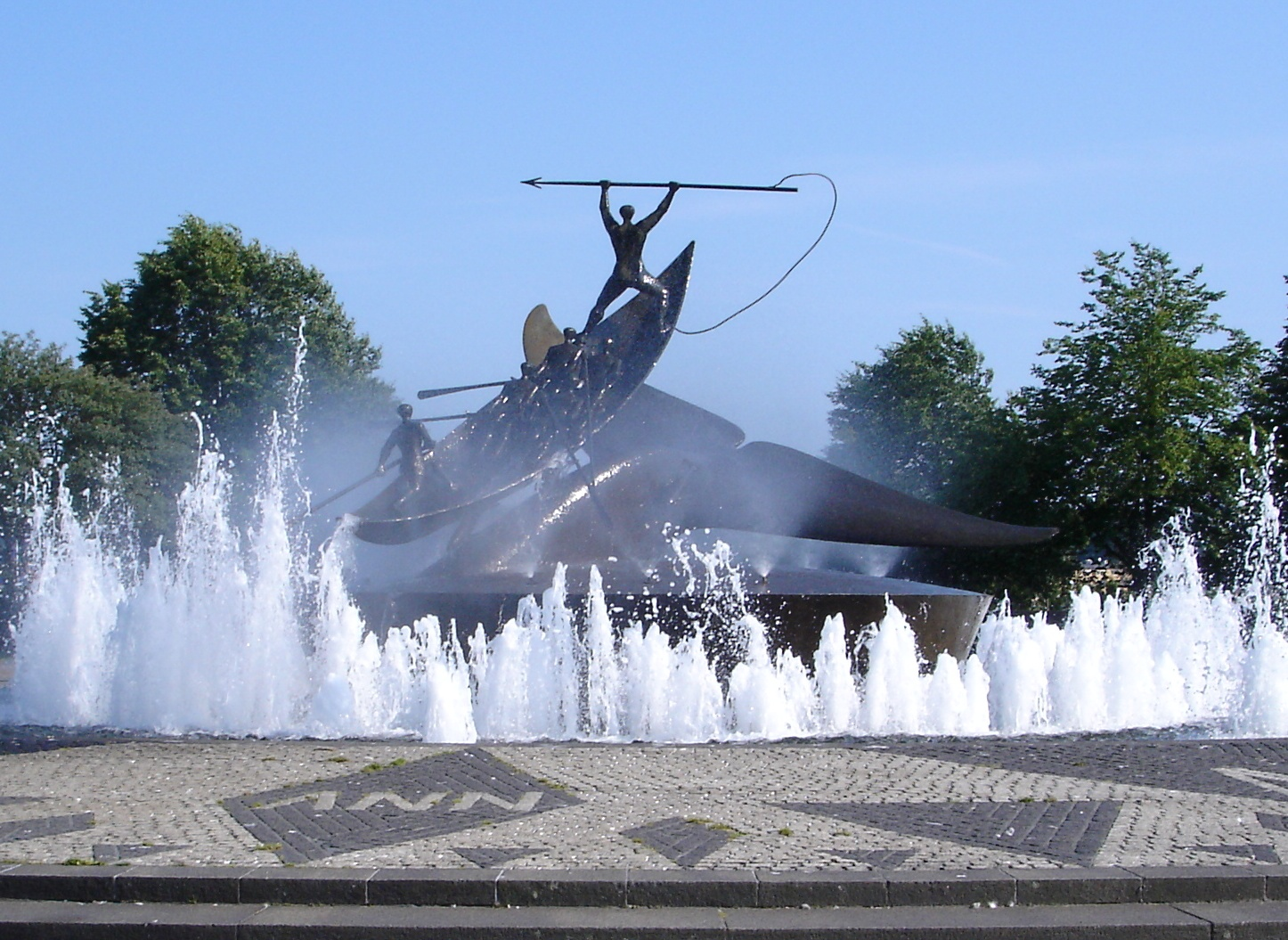
Whaler's Monument is made in style of a compass, and it rotates slowly.

Sandefjord is perhaps best known as a whaling community. The centre of the world's modern whaling industry was located in town, and local residents not only made up practically all the crew on the Norwegian whaling fleet, but substantial numbers of them also worked within the whaling industry in nearby countries. For over fifty years in the late 1800s, Sandefjord functioned as the world center for the whaling industry, including the manufacture and equipment of whaling vessels, floating factories, and whale-catchers. Sandefjord has also been named the "whaling capital of the world". There were 25 whaling companies that were established in Sandefjord between 1905 and 1914. During the 1911–1912 season, Sandefjord had 27 whaling companies with a total of 115 vessels. This made up over 30 percent of the world's whaling firms.

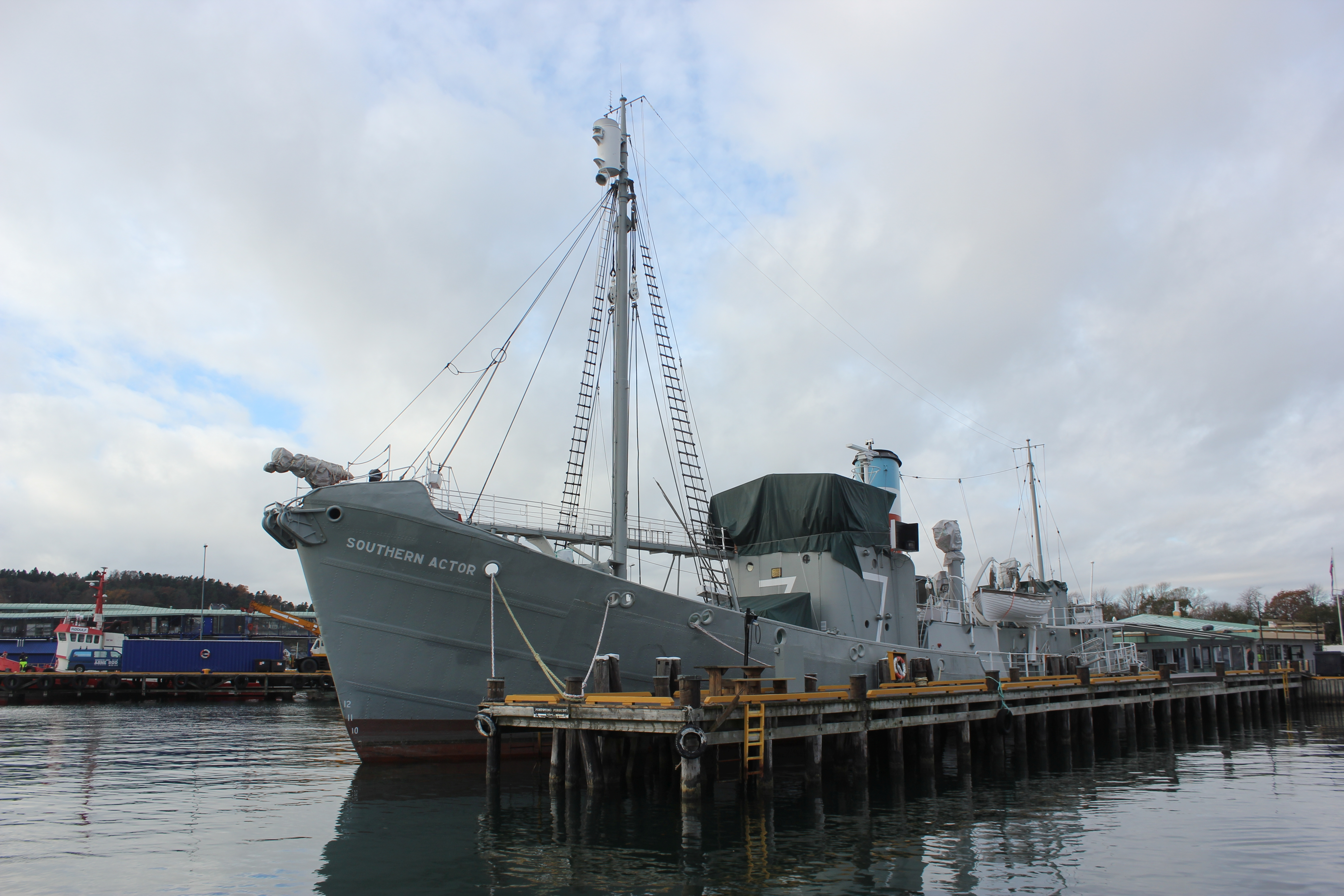
Southern Actor, museum ship at Museum's Wharf

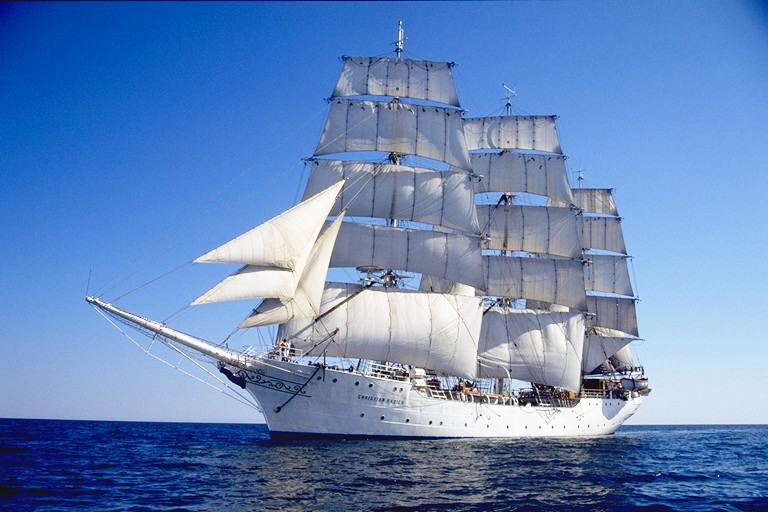
Christian Radich, full-rigged ship built in Sandefjord

Starting in 1850, a number of ships from Sandefjord were whaling and sealing in the Arctic Ocean and along the coast of Finnmark. The first whaling expedition from Sandefjord to the Antarctic Ocean was sent in 1905. Towards the end of the 1920s, Sandefjord had a fleet of 15 factory ships and more than 90 whalers. In 1954, more than 2,800 men from the district were hired as crew on the whalers, but from the mid-1950s whaling was gradually reduced. The number of southbound expeditions rapidly decreased during the 1960s, and the 1967–1968 season became the last for Sandefjord. In 1971, Sandefjord's last whale processing vessel was sold to Japan. The shipping industry was gradually readjusted from whaling to other ship types during this period. The local Framnæs Mekaniske Værksted and Jotun Group Private Ltd. had major roles in this business.

Today, the memories of this important period of Sandefjord's history are kept alive at the Whaling Museum (Hvalfangstmuseet). This museum is the only museum in Europe specializing in whales and the history of whaling. The history of the whalers can also be explored at the Museum's Wharf with a visit aboard the whale-catcher Southern Actor. Whaling is considered to be the industry which made Sandefjord the richest city in Norway.

Sandefjord also has shipping traditions of tall sailing ships and steam ships. The full-rigged sailing ship Christian Radich, three-masted barquentine Endurance, whale catcher Jason and Viking ship replica Viking were some of the many ships built by Framnæs Mekaniske Værksted.

Hans Albert Grøn of Sandefjord established the first whaling station in the Faroe Islands in 1894, which was located at Gjánoyri on the island of Streymoy. As of 1903, half of all whaling companies in the Faroe Islands were operated out of Sandefjord. Furthermore, Sandefjord was the headquarters of the South African Whaling Company (SAWC), which was established in 1908 and managed by shipowner Johan Bryde of Sandefjord. Sandefjordian whaling firms were also established on the coast of Africa, in Portugal, Mexico, Western Australia, and Stewart Island, among other places.

=== Antarctic expeditions ===
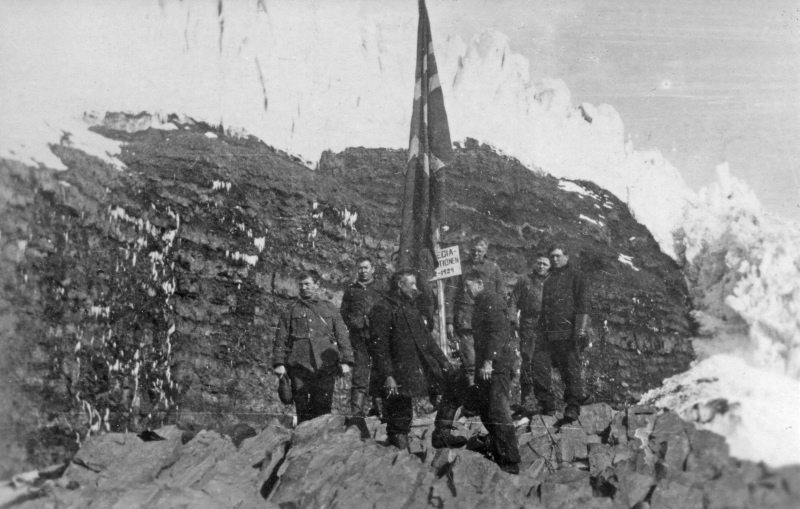
The Norwegian flag was raised at Framnæsodden in Sandefjord Cove on Antarctica's Peter I Island in 1929.

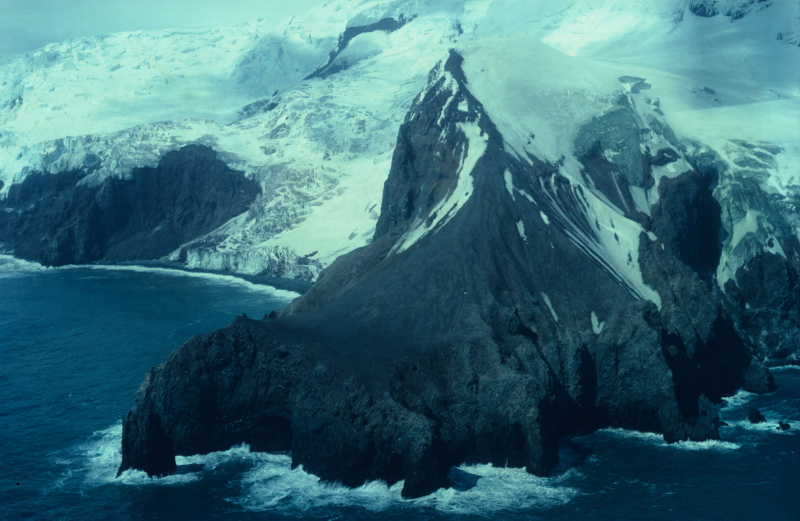
Norway achieved sovereignty of Bouvet Island during Nils Larsen's Antarctic expeditions.

Towards the beginning of World War I, Norwegian whaling spread throughout the world, most and foremost from Sandefjord. Expeditions from Sandefjord went as far as Norwegian Bay in Australia, Stewart Island in New Zealand, Walvis Bay in Namibia, Corral, Chile, and also isolated places such as Kerguelen Islands, South Georgia Island, Bouvet Island, and the Southern Ocean.

In the 1910s, affluent resident August F. Christensen was given a grant to practice whaling outside Peru and Ecuador. He was also appointed Ecuador's consul to Norway. He achieved an agreement with Ecuadorian government officials which allowed Norwegians to inhabit the Galápagos Islands, and also receive 200 hectares (490 acres) of land, pay no taxes for ten years, and be allowed to keep their Norwegian citizenship. Christensen created huge local interest of Galápagos, and the local company La Colonia de Floreana A/S was established on 21 March 1925. Its main goal was to exploit the Norwegian fishing rights at the Galápagos Islands. A ship named Floreana departed from Sandefjord on 15 May 1925, equipped with enough men and goods to establish a colony.

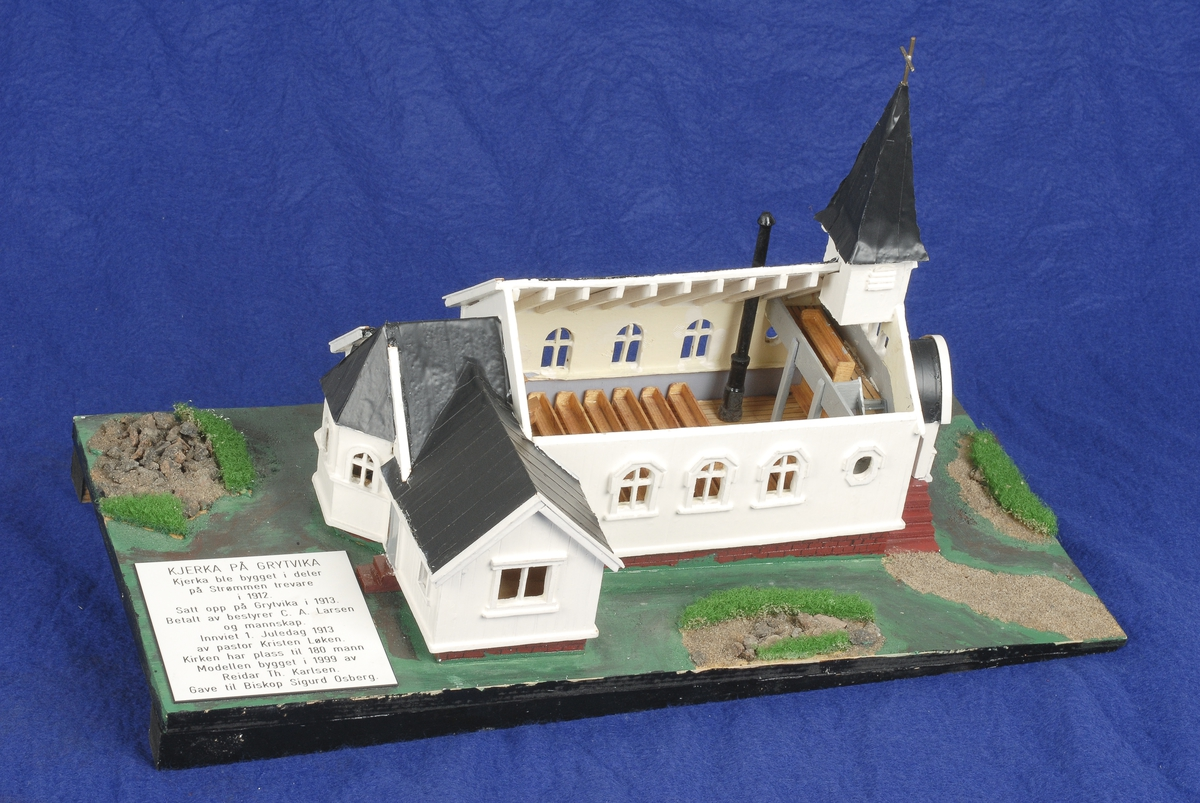
Model of Whalers Church in Grytviken, exhibit at Sandefjord Museum.

On 16 November 1904, Carl Anton Larsen of Sandefjord established the whaling community of Grytviken, the largest settlement in South Georgia and the South Sandwich Islands. South Georgia Island lies a few thousand kilometers east of Cape Horn.

Nils Larsen (1900–1976) was a sea captain from Sandefjord, famous for his expeditions of Antarctica in the early 20th century. It was under his expeditions that Norway achieved annexation of Bouvet Island in 1927 and Peter I Island two years after. A cove on Antarctica's Peter I Island is named Sandefjord Cove in honor of Larsen's hometown. Sandefjord Ice Bay in continental Antarctica is also named after Sandefjord. Mount Nils Larsen in Queen Maud Land, Mount Nils in Enderby Land and Nils Larsen Glacier are examples of many geographical names given in honor of Nils Larsen.

=== World War II ===
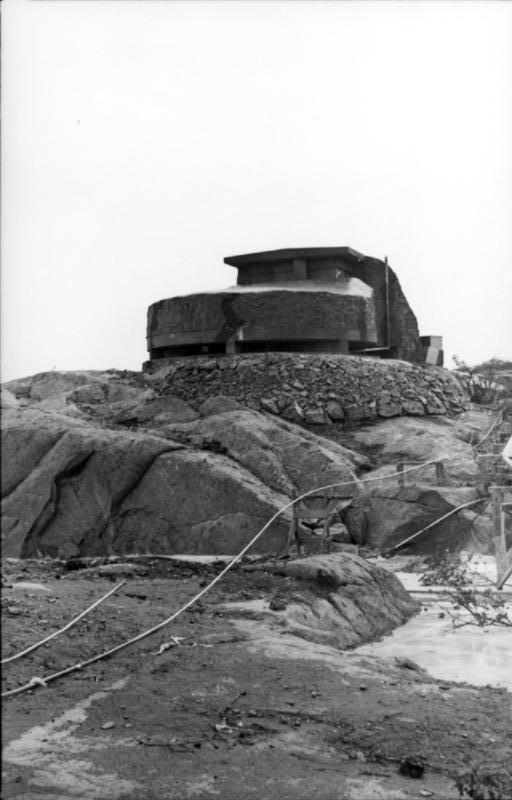
German fortresses were constructed on both West- and East Island.

A week after Operation Weserübung, German forces entered Sandefjord on 16 April 1940. About 30-40 men arrived in semi-trucks from Horten under the leadership of Erik von Drydalski. After handing their directives to Sandefjord police chief Kjartan Bruun Hansen, the men left for Hotel Atlantic, where they established their headquarters in Sandefjord. German troops in Sandefjord soon rose to 200. At the beginning of the German occupation of Norway, a German Hafenkapitän (harbormaster) was placed at Tollboden, and a representative for Admiral Norwegen was placed in an office building at Framnes verft. German soldiers could be seen marching throughout the city. At the beginning of the occupation, over 2,000 German officers visited Socitetsbygningen (today's Park Hotel), which belonged to Sandefjord Spa. The Nazi flag was waving over the building during the visit. Norwegian students were told to learn the German language, and handed out a book, Deutsche Fibel. They were also given a copy of Adolf Hitler's book Mein Kampf translated into the Norwegian language.

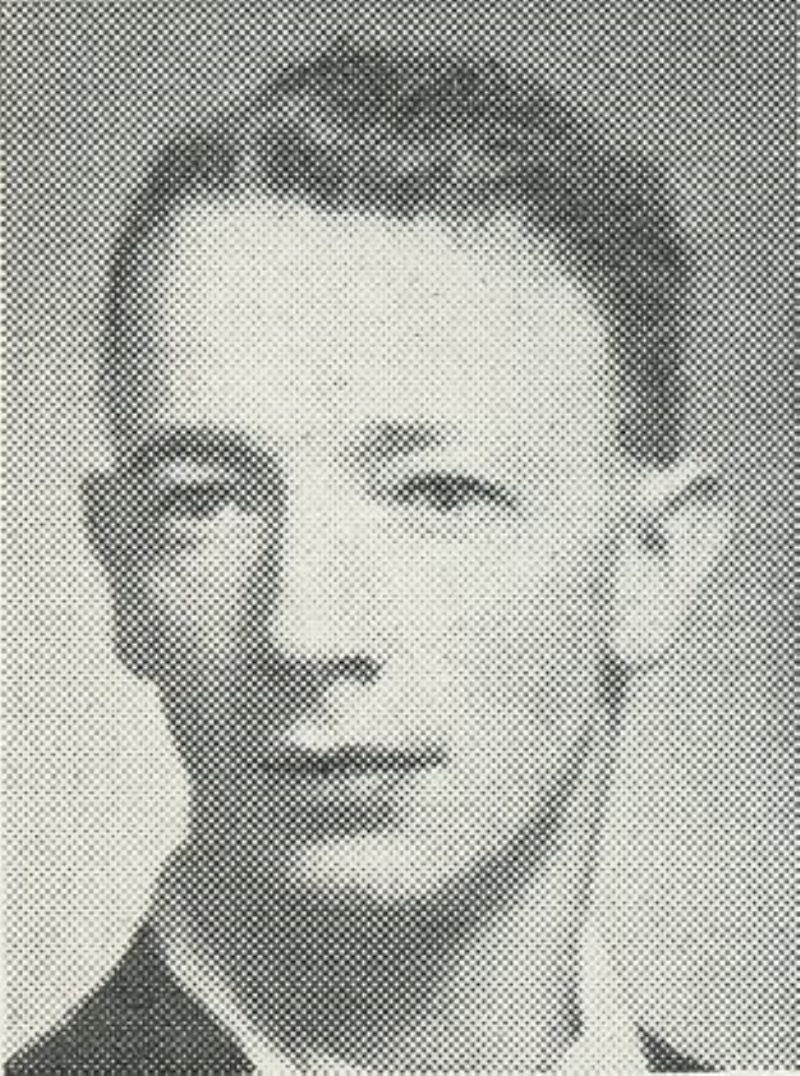
Albert Skålsvik of Krokemoa is honored at Minnehallen.

German forces constructed two coastal forts in Sandefjord, located at the southern tips of two local peninsulas: Vesterøya and Østerøya. The largest German construction in Sandefjord took place at Folehavna, where a fortress was erected in the spring of 1941. Four cannons with a target range of 14 kilometres (8.7 mi) were installed at the site, along with a 120-metre (390 ft) tunnel. The four 15-centimetre (5.9 in) cannons were installed in concrete gun pits on the sloping rocks. German construction also took place by the lake Goksjø, and also at Jernbaneallén, where a former garage structure was turned into a prison camp.

Many local residents were killed during World War II, including a number of seamen. Håkon Andersen of Framnes was killed onboard Arcturus when the ship was attacked by British Beaufighters. Albert K. J. Skålsvik (1921–1944) of Krokemoa, a member of the Norwegian Homefleet ("Hjemmeflåten"), was 18 years when the war broke out. Skålsvik was killed, along with the captain, when the ship DS Kong Bjørn was attacked by allied warplanes by Ryvingen Lighthouse in 1944. He is now commemorated at the Hall of Remembrance in the town of Stavern in neighborin Larvik Municipality. Skålsvik's younger brother, Bernard, was also a part of the Homefleet and was killed at age 17 in 1945.

Radios were illegal, and people of Sandefjord such as Henry Melby of Gokstad was arrested for having a radio in 1942. He was incarcerated at the tanker Inger Johanne, which was attacked by allied warplanes in 1944, killing 15 people, including Henry Melby.

In the fall of 1941, German occupation forces replaced Sandefjord's city manager Finn Sandberg with NS-member Frithjof Holtedahl who was soon appointed mayor. The neighboring Sandar Municipality received its NS mayor in November 1941, Ole Kristian Holtan. Olaf Bøe from Nasjonal Samling was appointed editor for Sandefjords Presse by Anders Beggerud in 1944.

Following World War II, Norway became one of the founding members of NATO and several air bases were constructed in Norway using NATO funds. One of these was Sandefjord Airport Torp, which was to be used by the United States Air Force in case of war. Construction began in 1953 and was completed in July 1956.

=== SAS merge ===
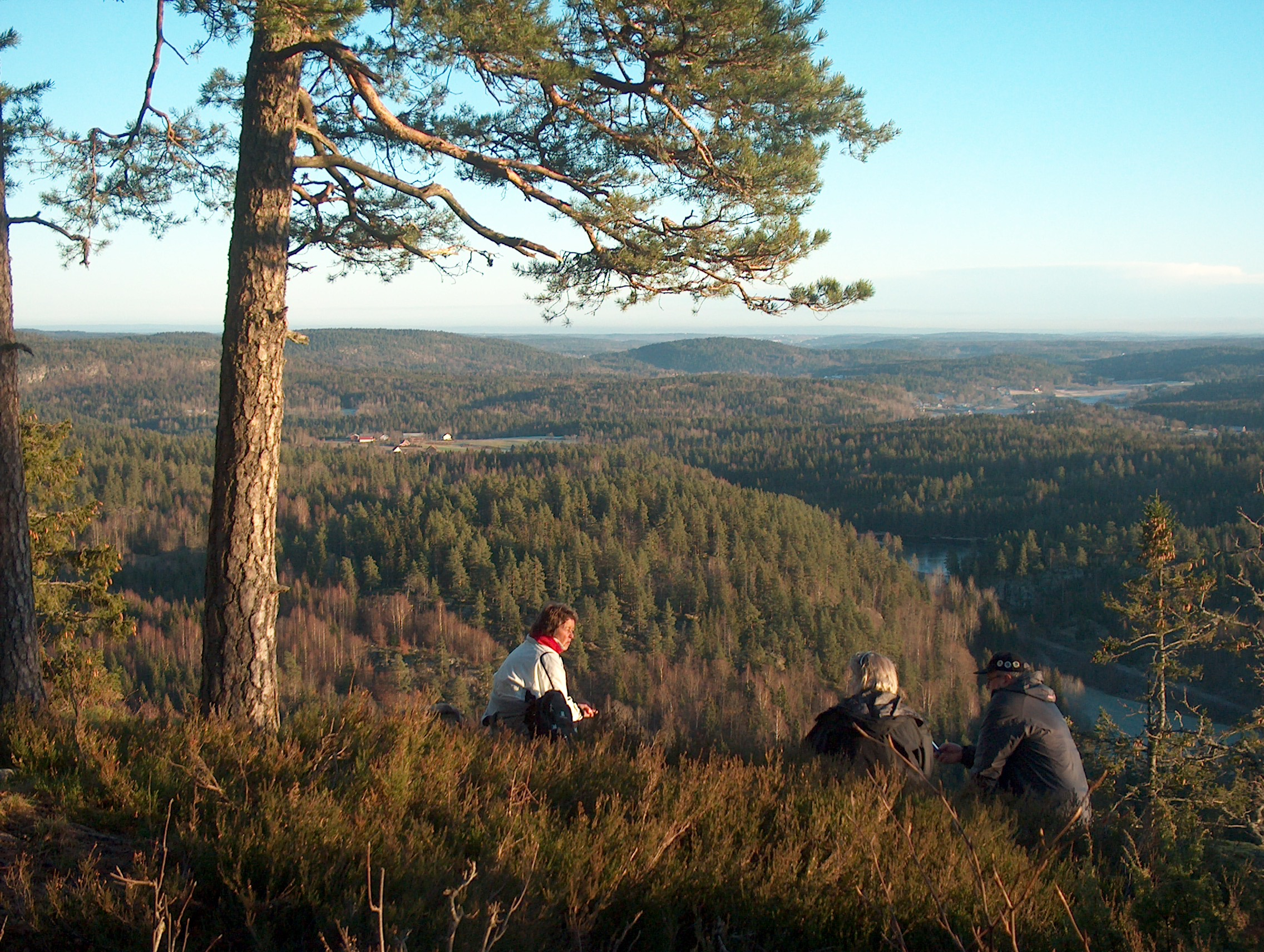
Rural municipalities of Andebu and Stokke merged into Sandefjord in 2017.

Sandefjord Municipality (S), Andebu Municipality (A) and Stokke Municipality (S) merged on 1 January 2017. The merger was the first of numerous nationwide merges following a municipal reform by the Solberg Cabinet. The "new" municipality became the most populous in Vestfold county. Proposed names for the "new" municipality were Gokstad, Sandar, and Torp, however, the name Sandefjord was ultimately kept.

A poll conducted by the Sandefjords Blad newspaper in January 2015 called 600 residents in Andebu Municipality, 750 in Stokke Municipality, and 1,000 in Sandefjord Municipality. All were given the question "Do you think Stokke, Andebu, and Sandefjord should establish one single municipality?". About 69% of Sandefjord residents answered "yes", while 64% (Andebu) and 61% (Stokke) answered "yes" in Stokke and Andebu.

Few Stokke residents read Sandefjords Blad, the main newspaper of Sandefjord, and relatively few residents commute to the city of Sandefjord for work. Despite this, Stokke residents voted to merge with Sandefjord due to two key features: its wealth and the nearby international airport. About 78 percent of Stokke residents ultimately voted to merge into Sandefjord during the September 2015 elections.

=== Population growth ===
The municipality experienced a 98.6 percent population growth from 1875 to 1900. Even not including the boundary adjustments between the municipalities of Sandar and Sandefjord in 1888, this population increase was substantially higher than most Norwegian cities. Sandar experienced the largest population growth of any Norwegian town, and over twice the growth of other towns in Vestfold County.

From 1875 to 1900, the disposable income of people from Sandefjord increased by over 200 percent. Total assets in local banks also increased, and in 1895–1900, total assets went from NOK 0.6 to 1.9 million in Aktiekreditbanken and from NOK 1.1 million to 1.3 million in Sandefjords Sparebank. Even after whaling lost its importance, Sandefjord remained Norway's richest city, and from 1913 to 1917, the median income increased by over 350 percent.

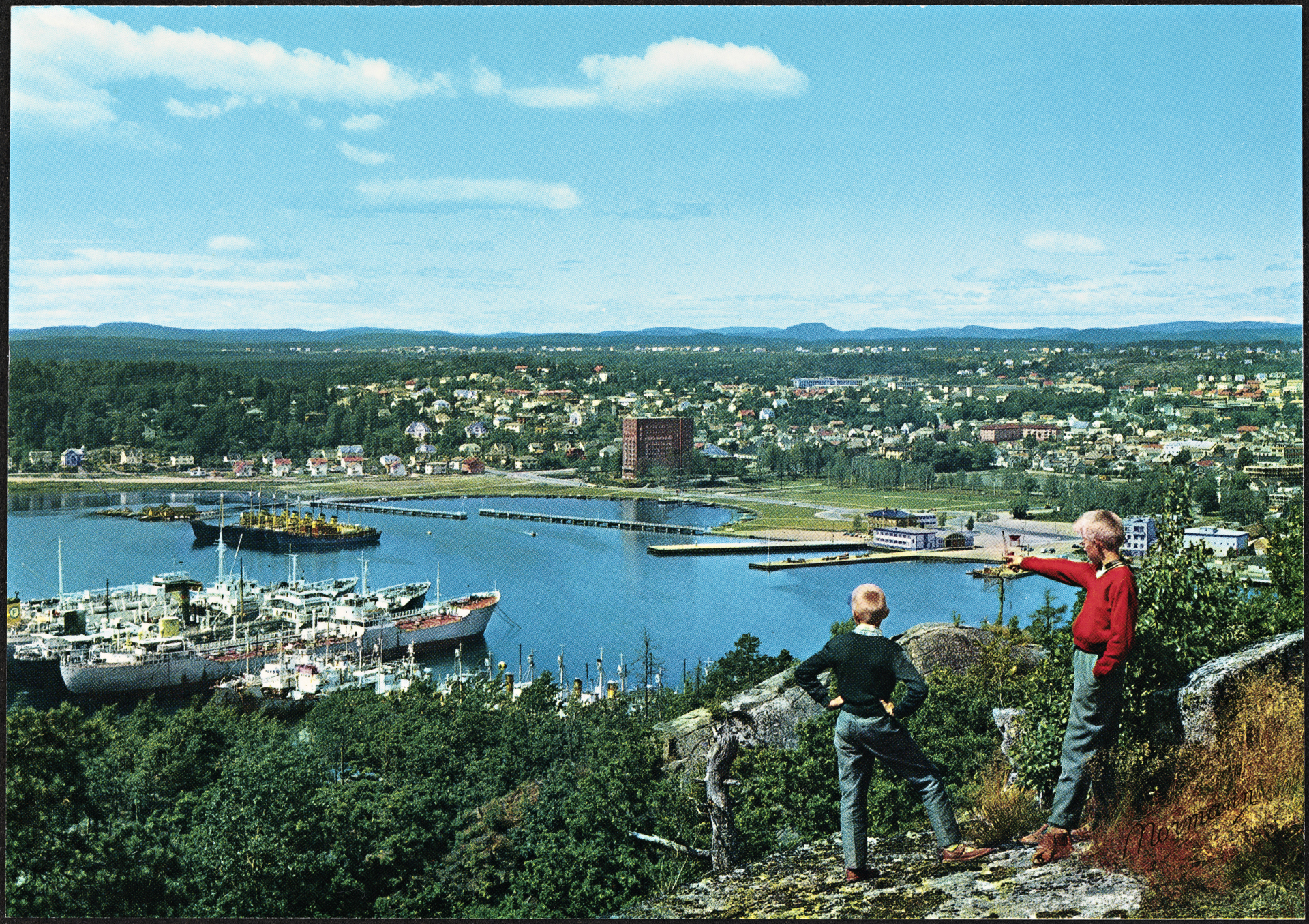
Postcard of Sandefjord − about 1970

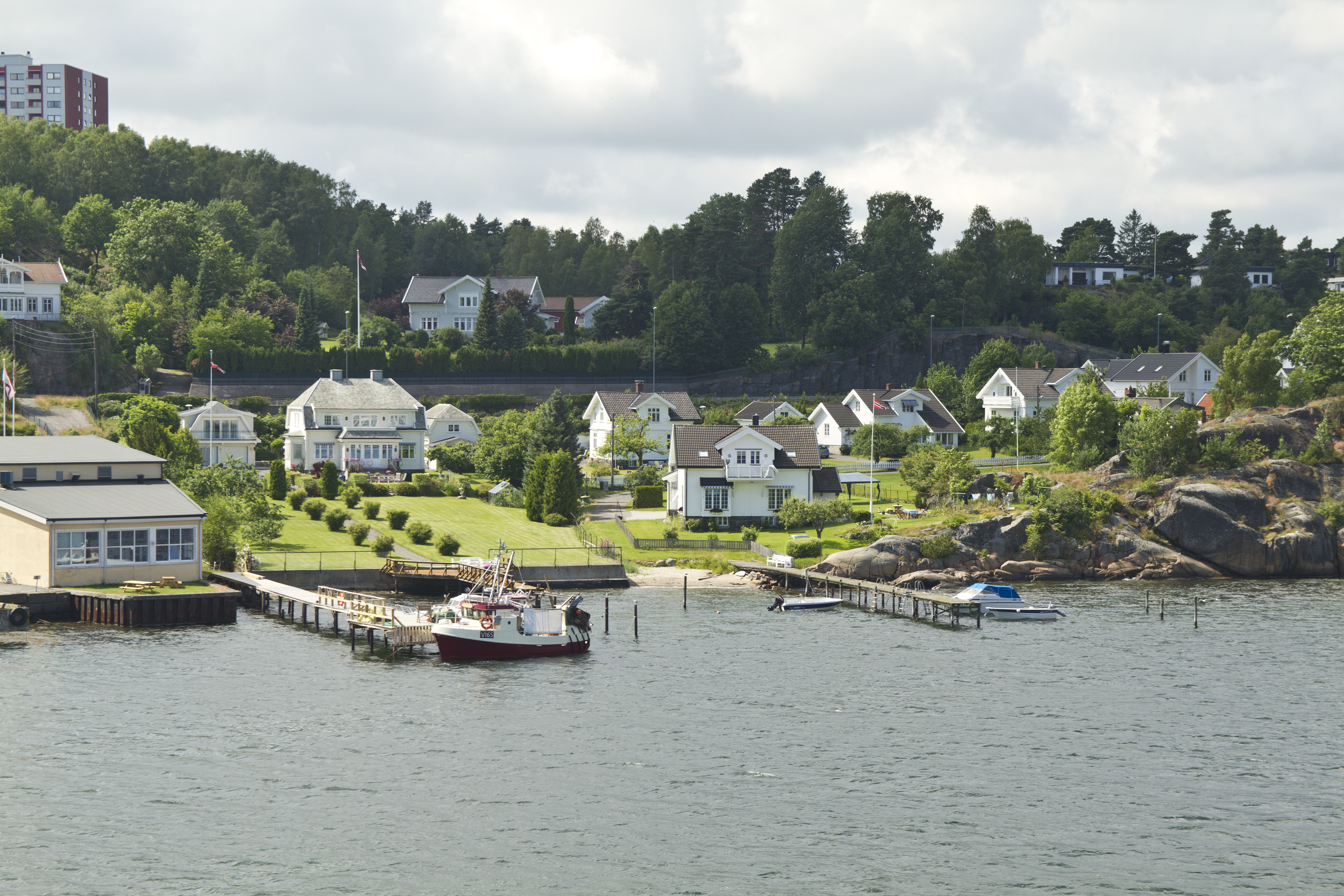
Ommestadkollen

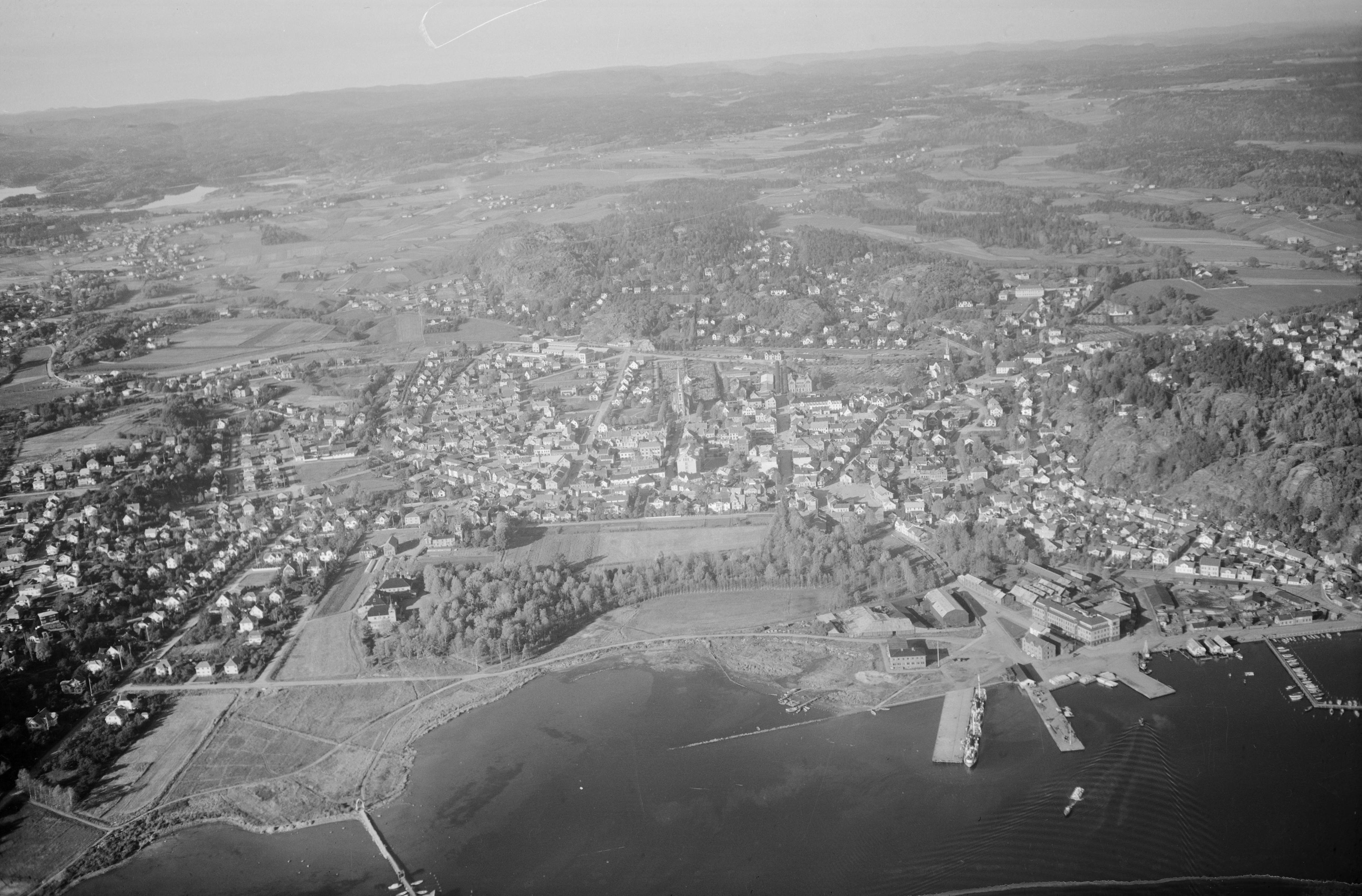
Sandefjord in 1947

== Geography ==
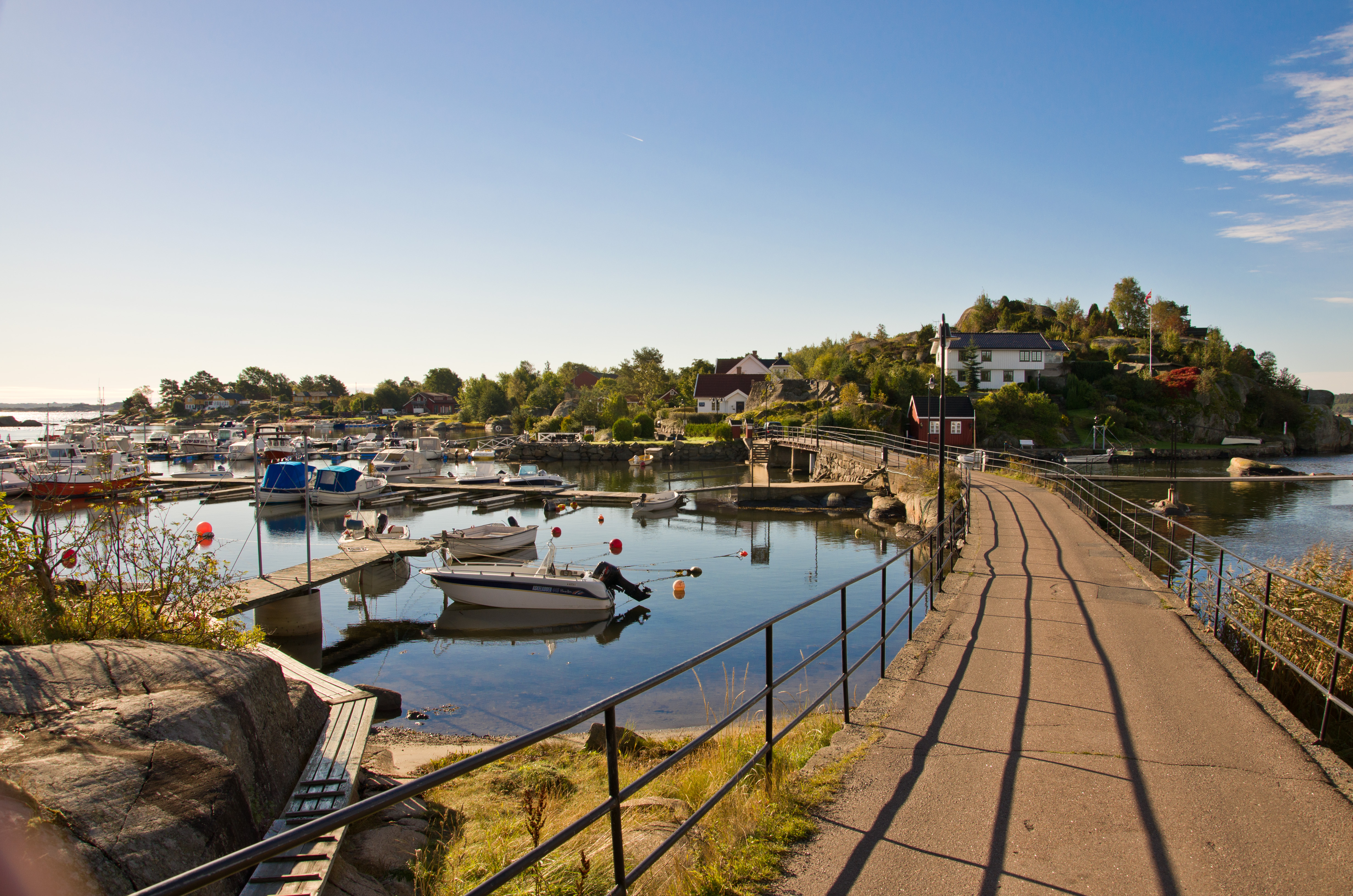
The bridge to Natholmen, one of 116 islands in Sandefjord.

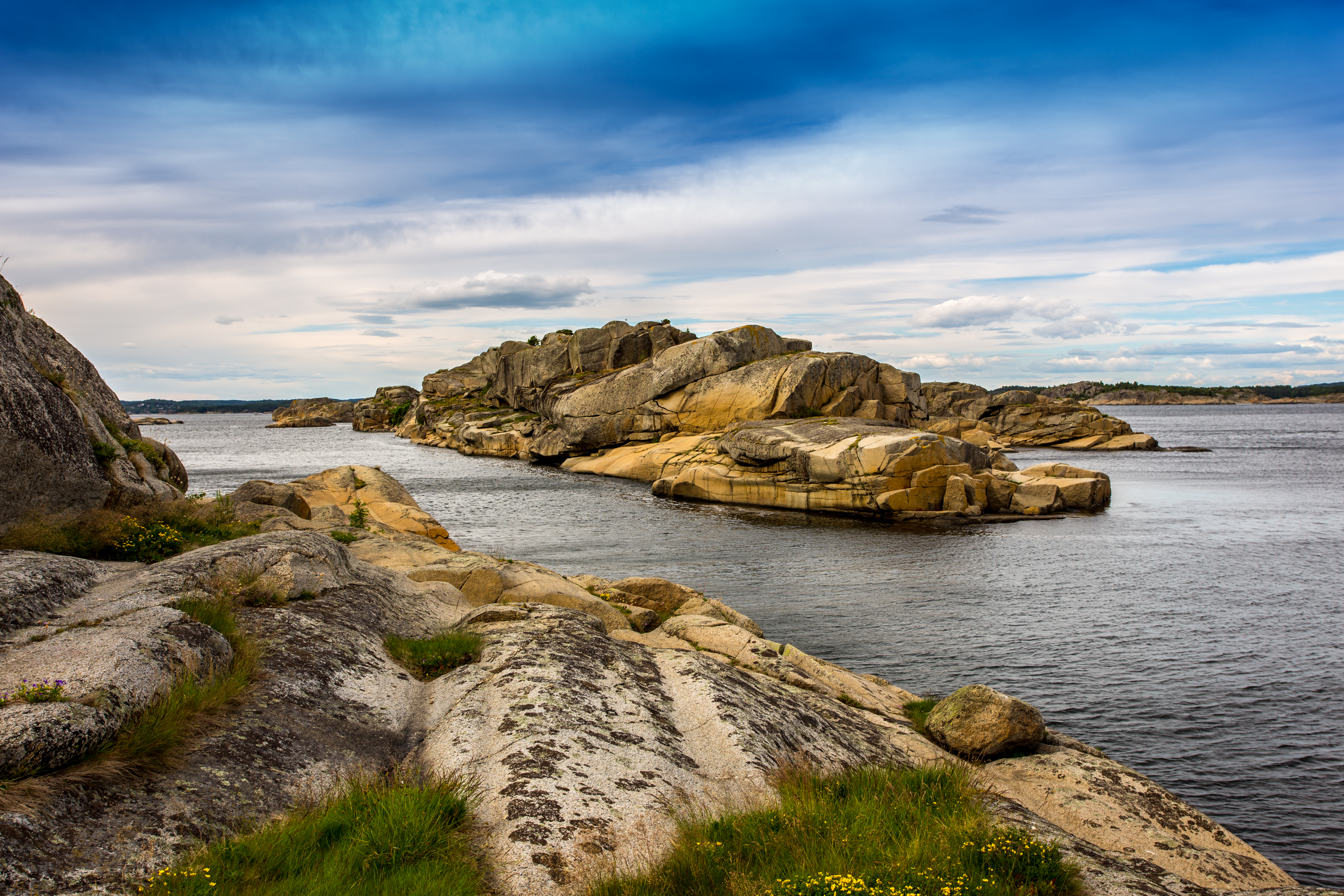
The Stauper Islands

Sandefjord is a coastal municipality on the western shore of the Oslo Fjord. It can be described as a suburb of Oslo, situated 110 kilometres (68 mi) southwest of the capital. Sandefjord is the largest municipality in Vestfold county. Its coastline has various beaches and sheltered coves, and several forests are scattered across the municipality. The two peninsulas called Østerøya ("East Island") and Vesterøya ("West Island") contribute to a total coastline of 146 kilometres (91 mi), and form the Sandefjordsfjorden and Mefjorden. The coastline offers a wide variety of sandy beaches, skerries, and islets, along with bays and sloping rocks. Forested areas are often laced with paths and lighted for trails for summer hikes and winter skiing. Of Sandefjord's total area, 37.7 square kilometres (14.6 sq mi) (31%) is agricultural and 36.2 square kilometres (14.0 sq mi) (26%) is forest. About 2 percent is made up of lakes and rivers. Sandefjord is located east of Larvik Municipality, west of Færder Municipality, and southwest of Tønsberg Municipality.

The coastal municipality includes about 124 islands. Small island bays give shelter for overnight campers, and many islets have relatively accessible beaches. Sandefjord is home to several peninsulas, including the 12-square-kilometre (4.6 sq mi) Vesterøya, the 8-square-kilometre (3.1 sq mi) Østerøya, the 1-square-kilometre (0.39 sq mi) Engø, Marøy, and Årø. The island of Langøya (Langø) is the largest island at 0.55 square kilometres (140 acres), while other islands include the 0.4-square-kilometre (99-acre) Ravnø, the 0.25-square-kilometre (62-acre) Skogøy/Storøya, the 0.2-square-kilometre (49-acre) Natholmen, the 0.13-square-kilometre (32-acre) Storholmen, the 0.1-square-kilometre (25-acre) Ormestadholmen, the 0.08-square-kilometre (20-acre) Grindholmen, and the 12-acre (0.049 km^{2}) Granholmen. Despite its location in between Flautangen and Lindholmen (both part of Færder Municipality) in the Tønsbergfjorden, the archipelago of Stauper belongs to Sandefjord. It consists of ten large islands and a number of smaller skerries and islets.

There were two natural lakes in Sandefjord prior to the 2017 merger: Goksjø, which is the third-largest in Vestfold County, and the smaller 2,000-square-metre (22,000 sq ft) lake Napperødtjern. Napperødtjern lies a few hundred meters north of Goksjø and is a nature preserve surrounded by swamp forests and wetland. Artificial ponds include Bugårdsdammen, Brydedammen, Virikdammen, Kroksjø, Veradammen, Svarttjern, and others. Local wildlife such as moose, deer, and avifauna can often be observed near freshwater lakes and rivers.

Sandefjord has four fjords: Sandefjordsfjord, Lahellefjord, Mefjord, and Tønsbergfjord, which it shares with neighboring Tønsberg Municipality and Færder Municipality.

The highest point in the municipality is Brånafjell at 398.9 metres (1,309 ft), which lies northwest of the village of Høyjord. Hjertås at 148 metres (486 ft) above sea level is the highest point within the city of Sandefjord. From the peak are surrounding views of the Oslofjord, Vealøs by Skien, Skrim and Torp.

=== Climate ===
Sandefjord has a warm-summer oceanic climate (Köppen: Cfb), characterized by moderately cold winters and mild summers. Precipitation is relatively consistent year-round but peaks in autumn. Snowfall is frequent during winter but is often interrupted by mild weather melting the snow. The first snowfall typically occur in November/December, but it can happen as early as October or as late as January.

Like the rest of Norway, Sandefjord's climate is moderated by the Gulf Stream, and the location on the southeastern coast of Norway contribute to generally sunny conditions compared to the rest of the country. During summer, the Melsom weather station receives the most sunshine in Norway, based on cloud cover measurements. Daily highs in the winter typically hover around 0 °C (32 °F) but can plunge to −15 to −20 °C (5 to −4 °F) during cold snaps. Summers are dominated by southwesterlies, and daily highs in July typically range from 19 to 25 °C (66 to 77 °F). The temperature occasionally rise toward 30 °C (86 °F) during hot spells. The highest recorded temperature at Melsom is 33.4 °C (92.1 °F) in July 2018, while the lowest is −31.4 °C (−24.5 °F) from February 1966.

From late May through July, the twilight at midnight is bright enough that the horizon and many objects remain visible, but details are difficult to spot clearly. However, flashlights are unnecessary for basic navigation. These nights also feature continuous birdsong. The UV index peaks at 0 to 1 during the winter, while climbing to 5 to 6 in June.

Climate data for Melsom 1991-2020 (26 m, avg high/low 2003–2025)
| Month | Jan | Feb | Mar | Apr | May | Jun | Jul | Aug | Sep | Oct | Nov | Dec | Year |
|---|---|---|---|---|---|---|---|---|---|---|---|---|---|
| Mean daily maximum °C (°F) | 1.1 (34.0) | 2.0 (35.6) | 6.1 (43.0) | 11.3 (52.3) | 16.4 (61.5) | 20.4 (68.7) | 22.3 (72.1) | 21 (70) | 17.1 (62.8) | 11 (52) | 6 (43) | 2.4 (36.3) | 11.4 (52.6) |
| Daily mean °C (°F) | −1.6 (29.1) | −1.5 (29.3) | 1.4 (34.5) | 5.9 (42.6) | 11.1 (52.0) | 14.9 (58.8) | 17.1 (62.8) | 16.1 (61.0) | 12.1 (53.8) | 7.0 (44.6) | 2.9 (37.2) | −0.8 (30.6) | 7.1 (44.7) |
| Mean daily minimum °C (°F) | −4.5 (23.9) | −4.2 (24.4) | −2 (28) | 1.9 (35.4) | 6.6 (43.9) | 10.7 (51.3) | 12.9 (55.2) | 12.0 (53.6) | 9.1 (48.4) | 4.5 (40.1) | 0.8 (33.4) | −3.1 (26.4) | 3.7 (38.7) |
| Average precipitation mm (inches) | 93 (3.7) | 66 (2.6) | 65 (2.6) | 61 (2.4) | 72 (2.8) | 81 (3.2) | 75 (3.0) | 108 (4.3) | 114 (4.5) | 136 (5.4) | 125 (4.9) | 101 (4.0) | 1,097 (43.2) |
Source: yr.no (mean, precipitation)

=== Villages ===
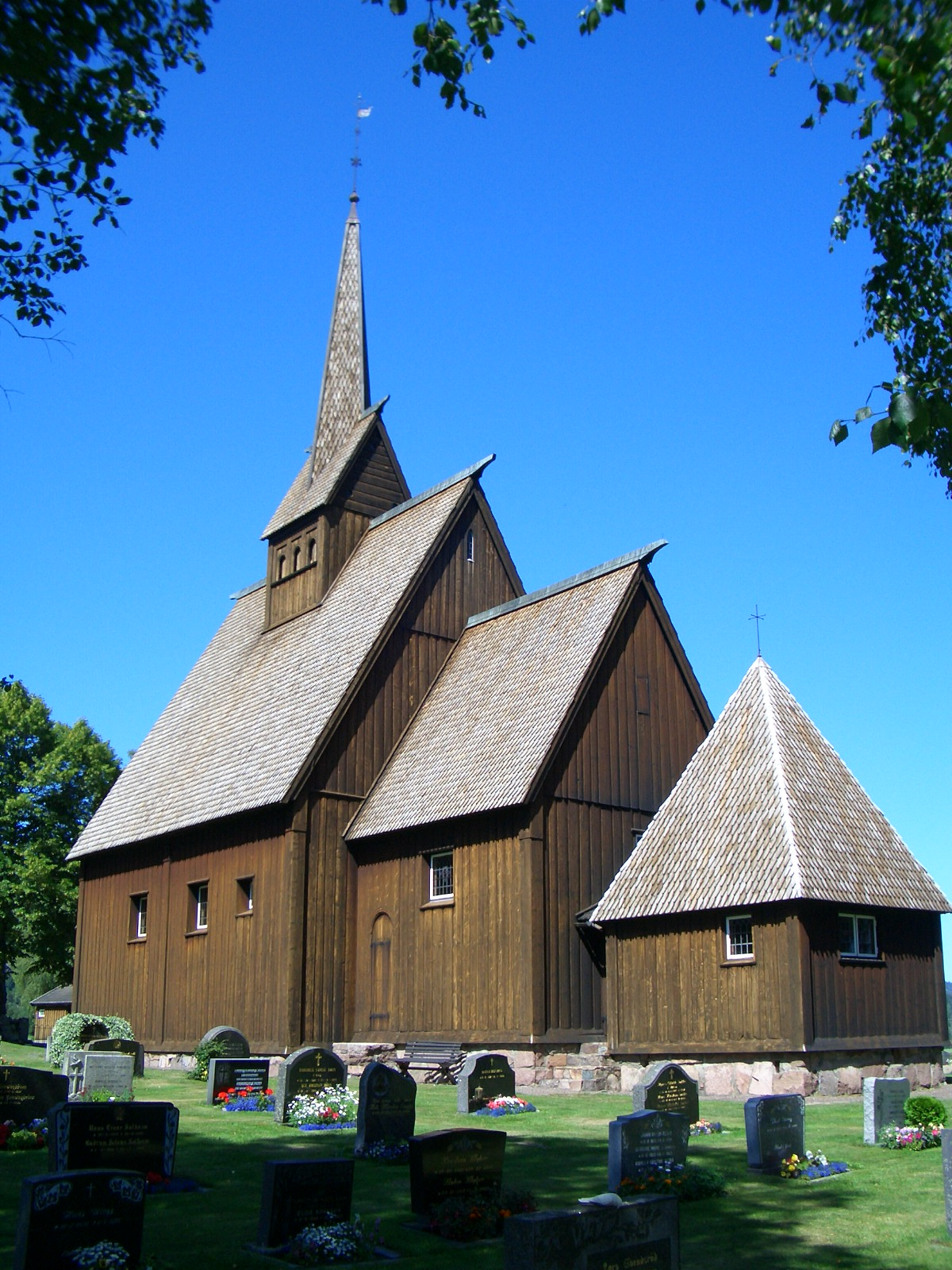
Høyjord Stave Church is the only stave church left in Vestfold County.

Sandefjord Municipality includes several larger urban areas in addition to the city of Sandefjord (population: 45,816):

- Stokke (2022 pop. 4,221)
- Andebu (pop. 2,532)
- Melsomvik (pop. 2,067)
- Kodal (pop. 1,059)
- Fossnes (pop. 650)
- Høyjord (pop. 381)

A small part of Sandefjord Municipality, the Himberg farm, is an exclave inside the borders of the neighboring Larvik Municipality. All efforts at annexing Himberg into surrounding Larvik have been met with massive protests from local residents. A 1995 annexation attempt was ultimately canceled due to large protests from Himberg residents. Himberg is a rural agricultural community consisting of no more than ten households. There are only four similar exclaves in Norway, and Himberg is the most populous exclave in the nation, with a population of around 40. It is 1.4 square kilometres (0.54 sq mi).

== Government ==
Sandefjord Municipality is responsible for primary education (through 10th grade), outpatient health services, senior citizen services, welfare and other social services, zoning, economic development, and municipal roads and utilities. The municipality is governed by a municipal council of directly elected representatives. The mayor is indirectly elected by a vote of the municipal council. The municipality is under the jurisdiction of the Vestfold District Court and the Agder Court of Appeal.

=== Mayors ===
The mayor (Norwegian: ordfører) of Sandefjord Municipality is the political leader of the municipality and the chairperson of the municipal council.

=== Municipal council ===
The municipal council (Kommunestyre) of Sandefjord Municipality is made up of 45 representatives that are elected to four year terms. The tables below show the current and historical composition of the council by political party.

Sandefjord kommunestyre 2023–2027
| Party name (in Norwegian) | Number of representatives |
|---|---|
| Labour Party (Arbeiderpartiet) | 8 |
| Progress Party (Fremskrittspartiet) | 5 |
| Green Party (Miljøpartiet De Grønne) | 1 |
| Conservative Party (Høyre) | 18 |
| Industry and Business Party (Industri‑ og Næringspartiet) | 2 |
| Christian Democratic Party (Kristelig Folkeparti) | 2 |
| Norway Democrats (Norgesdemokratene) | 1 |
| Red Party (Rødt) | 1 |
| Centre Party (Senterpartiet) | 2 |
| Socialist Left Party (Sosialistisk Venstreparti) | 3 |
| Liberal Party (Venstre) | 2 |
| Total number of members: | 45 |

Sandefjord kommunestyre 2019–2023
| Party name (in Norwegian) | Number of representatives |
|---|---|
| Labour Party (Arbeiderpartiet) | 12 |
| Progress Party (Fremskrittspartiet) | 4 |
| Green Party (Miljøpartiet De Grønne) | 2 |
| Conservative Party (Høyre) | 15 |
| Christian Democratic Party (Kristelig Folkeparti) | 1 |
| Red Party (Rødt) | 1 |
| Centre Party (Senterpartiet) | 5 |
| Socialist Left Party (Sosialistisk Venstreparti) | 2 |
| Liberal Party (Venstre) | 3 |
| Total number of members: | 45 |

Sandefjord kommunestyre 2015–2019
| Party name (in Norwegian) | Number of representatives |
|---|---|
| Labour Party (Arbeiderpartiet) | 10 |
| Progress Party (Fremskrittspartiet) | 4 |
| Green Party (Miljøpartiet De Grønne) | 1 |
| Conservative Party (Høyre) | 17 |
| Christian Democratic Party (Kristelig Folkeparti) | 2 |
| Centre Party (Senterpartiet) | 1 |
| Socialist Left Party (Sosialistisk Venstreparti) | 2 |
| Liberal Party (Venstre) | 2 |
| Total number of members: | 39 |

Sandefjord kommunestyre 2011–2015
| Party name (in Norwegian) | Number of representatives |
|---|---|
| Labour Party (Arbeiderpartiet) | 9 |
| Progress Party (Fremskrittspartiet) | 5 |
| Conservative Party (Høyre) | 18 |
| Christian Democratic Party (Kristelig Folkeparti) | 2 |
| Pensioners' Party (Pensjonistpartiet) | 1 |
| Socialist Left Party (Sosialistisk Venstreparti) | 2 |
| Liberal Party (Venstre) | 2 |
| Total number of members: | 39 |

Sandefjord kommunestyre 2007–2011
| Party name (in Norwegian) | Number of representatives |
|---|---|
| Labour Party (Arbeiderpartiet) | 7 |
| Progress Party (Fremskrittspartiet) | 8 |
| Conservative Party (Høyre) | 17 |
| Christian Democratic Party (Kristelig Folkeparti) | 2 |
| Pensioners' Party (Pensjonistpartiet) | 1 |
| Socialist Left Party (Sosialistisk Venstreparti) | 3 |
| Liberal Party (Venstre) | 1 |
| Total number of members: | 39 |

Sandefjord kommunestyre 2003–2007
| Party name (in Norwegian) | Number of representatives |
|---|---|
| Labour Party (Arbeiderpartiet) | 8 |
| Progress Party (Fremskrittspartiet) | 10 |
| Conservative Party (Høyre) | 10 |
| Christian Democratic Party (Kristelig Folkeparti) | 2 |
| Pensioners' Party (Pensjonistpartiet) | 2 |
| Centre Party (Senterpartiet) | 1 |
| Socialist Left Party (Sosialistisk Venstreparti) | 5 |
| Liberal Party (Venstre) | 1 |
| Total number of members: | 39 |

Sandefjord kommunestyre 1999–2003
| Party name (in Norwegian) | Number of representatives |
|---|---|
| Labour Party (Arbeiderpartiet) | 8 |
| Progress Party (Fremskrittspartiet) | 9 |
| Conservative Party (Høyre) | 14 |
| Christian Democratic Party (Kristelig Folkeparti) | 5 |
| Pensioners' Party (Pensjonistpartiet) | 4 |
| Centre Party (Senterpartiet) | 1 |
| Socialist Left Party (Sosialistisk Venstreparti) | 5 |
| Liberal Party (Venstre) | 1 |
| Total number of members: | 47 |

Sandefjord kommunestyre 1995–1999
| Party name (in Norwegian) | Number of representatives |
|---|---|
| Labour Party (Arbeiderpartiet) | 12 |
| Progress Party (Fremskrittspartiet) | 9 |
| Conservative Party (Høyre) | 16 |
| Christian Democratic Party (Kristelig Folkeparti) | 4 |
| Red Electoral Alliance (Rød Valgallianse) | 1 |
| Centre Party (Senterpartiet) | 2 |
| Socialist Left Party (Sosialistisk Venstreparti) | 2 |
| Liberal Party (Venstre) | 1 |
| Total number of members: | 47 |

Sandefjord kommunestyre 1991–1995
| Party name (in Norwegian) | Number of representatives |
|---|---|
| Labour Party (Arbeiderpartiet) | 14 |
| Progress Party (Fremskrittspartiet) | 7 |
| Conservative Party (Høyre) | 18 |
| Christian Democratic Party (Kristelig Folkeparti) | 5 |
| Red Electoral Alliance (Rød Valgallianse) | 1 |
| Centre Party (Senterpartiet) | 3 |
| Socialist Left Party (Sosialistisk Venstreparti) | 6 |
| Liberal Party (Venstre) | 1 |
| Total number of members: | 55 |

Sandefjord kommunestyre 1987–1991
| Party name (in Norwegian) | Number of representatives |
|---|---|
| Labour Party (Arbeiderpartiet) | 16 |
| Progress Party (Fremskrittspartiet) | 12 |
| Conservative Party (Høyre) | 18 |
| Christian Democratic Party (Kristelig Folkeparti) | 4 |
| Centre Party (Senterpartiet) | 1 |
| Socialist Left Party (Sosialistisk Venstreparti) | 2 |
| Liberal Party (Venstre) | 2 |
| Total number of members: | 55 |

Sandefjord kommunestyre 1983–1987
| Party name (in Norwegian) | Number of representatives |
|---|---|
| Labour Party (Arbeiderpartiet) | 17 |
| Progress Party (Fremskrittspartiet) | 6 |
| Conservative Party (Høyre) | 22 |
| Christian Democratic Party (Kristelig Folkeparti) | 4 |
| Centre Party (Senterpartiet) | 1 |
| Socialist Left Party (Sosialistisk Venstreparti) | 2 |
| Liberal Party (Venstre) | 3 |
| Total number of members: | 55 |

Sandefjord kommunestyre 1979–1983
| Party name (in Norwegian) | Number of representatives |
|---|---|
| Labour Party (Arbeiderpartiet) | 16 |
| Progress Party (Fremskrittspartiet) | 1 |
| Conservative Party (Høyre) | 26 |
| Christian Democratic Party (Kristelig Folkeparti) | 5 |
| New People's Party (Nye Folkepartiet) | 1 |
| Centre Party (Senterpartiet) | 2 |
| Socialist Left Party (Sosialistisk Venstreparti) | 1 |
| Liberal Party (Venstre) | 3 |
| Total number of members: | 55 |

Sandefjord kommunestyre 1975–1979
| Party name (in Norwegian) | Number of representatives |
|---|---|
| Labour Party (Arbeiderpartiet) | 18 |
| Anders Lange's Party (Anders Langes parti) | 1 |
| Conservative Party (Høyre) | 23 |
| Christian Democratic Party (Kristelig Folkeparti) | 6 |
| New People's Party (Nye Folkepartiet) | 2 |
| Centre Party (Senterpartiet) | 2 |
| Socialist Left Party (Sosialistisk Venstreparti) | 1 |
| Liberal Party (Venstre) | 2 |
| Total number of members: | 55 |

Sandefjord kommunestyre 1971–1975
| Party name (in Norwegian) | Number of representatives |
|---|---|
| Labour Party (Arbeiderpartiet) | 20 |
| Conservative Party (Høyre) | 21 |
| Christian Democratic Party (Kristelig Folkeparti) | 3 |
| Centre Party (Senterpartiet) | 4 |
| Socialist People's Party (Sosialistisk Folkeparti) | 2 |
| Liberal Party (Venstre) | 5 |
| Total number of members: | 55 |

Sandefjord kommunestyre 1967–1971
| Party name (in Norwegian) | Number of representatives |
|---|---|
| Labour Party (Arbeiderpartiet) | 21 |
| Conservative Party (Høyre) | 22 |
| Christian Democratic Party (Kristelig Folkeparti) | 2 |
| Centre Party (Senterpartiet) | 3 |
| Socialist People's Party (Sosialistisk Folkeparti) | 2 |
| Liberal Party (Venstre) | 5 |
| Total number of members: | 55 |

Sandefjord bystyre 1963–1967
| Party name (in Norwegian) | Number of representatives |
|---|---|
| Labour Party (Arbeiderpartiet) | 12 |
| Conservative Party (Høyre) | 20 |
| Christian Democratic Party (Kristelig Folkeparti) | 2 |
| Liberal Party (Venstre) | 3 |
| Total number of members: | 37 |

Sandefjord bystyre 1959–1963
| Party name (in Norwegian) | Number of representatives |
|---|---|
| Labour Party (Arbeiderpartiet) | 12 |
| Conservative Party (Høyre) | 20 |
| Christian Democratic Party (Kristelig Folkeparti) | 2 |
| Liberal Party (Venstre) | 3 |
| Total number of members: | 37 |

Sandefjord bystyre 1955–1959
| Party name (in Norwegian) | Number of representatives |
|---|---|
| Labour Party (Arbeiderpartiet) | 12 |
| Conservative Party (Høyre) | 19 |
| Christian Democratic Party (Kristelig Folkeparti) | 2 |
| Liberal Party (Venstre) | 4 |
| Total number of members: | 37 |

Sandefjord bystyre 1951–1955
| Party name (in Norwegian) | Number of representatives |
|---|---|
| Labour Party (Arbeiderpartiet) | 11 |
| Conservative Party (Høyre) | 18 |
| Christian Democratic Party (Kristelig Folkeparti) | 3 |
| Liberal Party (Venstre) | 4 |
| Total number of members: | 36 |

Sandefjord bystyre 1947–1951
| Party name (in Norwegian) | Number of representatives |
|---|---|
| Labour Party (Arbeiderpartiet) | 11 |
| Conservative Party (Høyre) | 16 |
| Communist Party (Kommunistiske Parti) | 1 |
| Christian Democratic Party (Kristelig Folkeparti) | 2 |
| Joint list of the Liberal Party (Venstre) and the Radical People's Party (Radikale Folkepartiet) | 6 |
| Total number of members: | 36 |

Sandefjord bystyre 1945–1947
| Party name (in Norwegian) | Number of representatives |
|---|---|
| Labour Party (Arbeiderpartiet) | 11 |
| Conservative Party (Høyre) | 14 |
| Communist Party (Kommunistiske Parti) | 2 |
| Christian Democratic Party (Kristelig Folkeparti) | 4 |
| Liberal Party (Venstre) | 5 |
| Total number of members: | 36 |

Sandefjord bystyre 1937–1940*
| Party name (in Norwegian) | Number of representatives |
|---|---|
| Labour Party (Arbeiderpartiet) | 11 |
| Conservative Party (Høyre) | 18 |
| Liberal Party (Venstre) | 7 |
| Total number of members: | 36 |
Note: Due to the German occupation of Norway during World War II, no elections were held for new municipal councils until after the war ended in 1945.

Sandefjord bystyre 1934–1937
| Party name (in Norwegian) | Number of representatives |
|---|---|
| Labour Party (Arbeiderpartiet) | 9 |
| Liberal Party (Venstre) | 9 |
| Joint list of the Conservative Party (Høyre) and the Free-minded People's Party (Frisinnede Folkeparti) | 18 |
| Total number of members: | 36 |

Sandefjord bystyre 1931–1934
| Party name (in Norwegian) | Number of representatives |
|---|---|
| Labour Party (Arbeiderpartiet) | 8 |
| Liberal Party (Venstre) | 8 |
| Joint list of the Conservative Party (Høyre) and the Free-minded People's Party (Frisinnede Folkeparti) | 20 |
| Total number of members: | 36 |

Sandefjord bystyre 1928–1931
| Party name (in Norwegian) | Number of representatives |
|---|---|
| Labour Party (Arbeiderpartiet) | 10 |
| Joint list of the Liberal Party and Temperance Party (Venstre og Avholdspartiet) | 7 |
| Joint list of the Conservative Party (Høyre) and the Free-minded Liberal Party (Frisinnede Venstre) | 19 |
| Total number of members: | 36 |

Sandefjord bystyre 1925–1928
| Party name (in Norwegian) | Number of representatives |
|---|---|
| Labour Party (Arbeiderpartiet) | 6 |
| Social Democratic Labour Party (Socialdemokratiske Arbeiderparti) | 2 |
| Joint list of the Liberal Party and Temperance Party (Venstre og Avholdspartiet) | 7 |
| Joint list of the Conservative Party (Høyre) and the Free-minded Liberal Party (Frisinnede Venstre) | 18 |
| Local List(s) (Lokale lister) | 3 |
| Total number of members: | 36 |

Sandefjord bystyre 1922–1925
| Party name (in Norwegian) | Number of representatives |
|---|---|
| Labour Party (Arbeiderpartiet) | 6 |
| Temperance Party (Avholdspartiet) | 5 |
| Social Democratic Labour Party (Socialdemokratiske Arbeiderparti) | 2 |
| Liberal Party (Venstre) | 2 |
| Joint list of the Conservative Party (Høyre) and the Free-minded Liberal Party (Frisinnede Venstre) | 19 |
| Local List(s) (Lokale lister) | 2 |
| Total number of members: | 36 |

Sandefjord bystyre 1919–1922
| Party name (in Norwegian) | Number of representatives |
|---|---|
| Labour Party (Arbeiderpartiet) | 9 |
| Liberal Party (Venstre) | 8 |
| Joint list of the Conservative Party (Høyre) and the Free-minded Liberal Party (Frisinnede Venstre) | 18 |
| Local List(s) (Lokale lister) | 1 |
| Total number of members: | 36 |

=== Politics ===
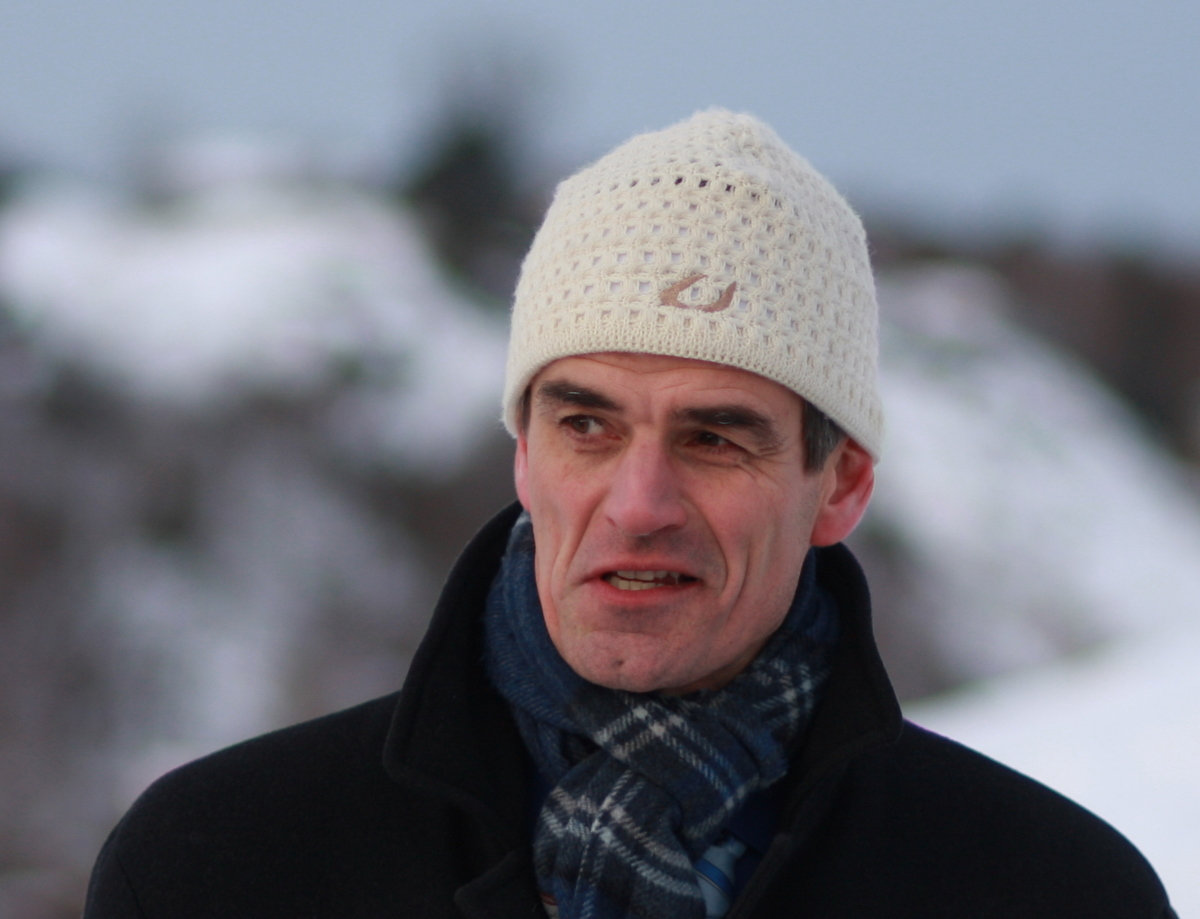
With assets of nearly half a billion kroner, Bjørn Ole Gleditsch (H) is the richest mayor in Norway.

Sandefjord is a stronghold for the Conservative Party. In the Norwegian local elections of 2011, 47.9% of voters voted for the Conservative Party. The right-wing parties received a total of 70.4% of the vote in Sandefjord, compared to 51.2% nationwide. The current mayor, Bjørn Ole Gleditsch, was elected in 2004 with the support of the Progress Party. Gleditsch is the wealthiest mayor to ever be elected in Norway. Cathrine Andersen from the Progress Party has been deputy mayor since 2015.

== Demographics ==
Historical population

| Year | Pop. | ±% p.a. |
|---|---|---|
| 1845 | 794 | — |
| 1855 | 1,165 | +3.91% |
| 1865 | 1,797 | +4.43% |
| 1875 | 2,452 | +3.16% |
| 1891 | 4,238 | +3.48% |
| 1900 | 4,869 | +1.55% |
| 1910 | 5,183 | +0.63% |

| Year | Pop. | ±% p.a. |
|---|---|---|
| 1920 | 5,651 | +0.87% |
| 1930 | 5,930 | +0.48% |
| 1946 | 6,302 | +0.38% |
| 1951 | 6,717 | +1.28% |
| 1960 | 6,984 | +0.43% |
| 1970 | 31,752 | +16.35% |
| 1980 | 34,758 | +0.91% |

| Year | Pop. | ±% p.a. |
|---|---|---|
| 1990 | 35,888 | +0.32% |
| 2000 | 39,317 | +0.92% |
| 2010 | 43,126 | +0.93% |
| 2020 | 63,764 | +3.99% |
| 2026 | 67,062 | +0.84% |

Note: The municipal borders were changed in 1889, 1931, and 1950; causing a significant change in the population.
Source: Statistics Norway and Norwegian Historical Data Centre

According to Statistics Norway in 2017, the municipality was home to 62,622 residents. There were 2,797 vacation homes in Sandefjord as of 2018, and 2,19 people per housing unit. About 69% of residents are members of Church of Norway, 18% are unaffiliated, and 12.8% are members of other religious communities. In addition to the local Church of Norway churches, the municipality also houses various minor congregations, including an Adventist church and Methodist church.

Religious minorities with congregations in town include Pentecostals (Salem), Catholics (St. Johannes Døperen), Methodists (Metodistkirken), Seventh-day Adventists (Adventkirken), Baptists (Baptistkirken), Norwegian Lutheran Mission (Den lille gren), Jehovas Witnesses (Rikets Sal) and Muslims (Alkawther Islam Center and Sandefjord Islamic Center). Baptists first established a congregation in town in the 1880s and Methodists in the 1890s.

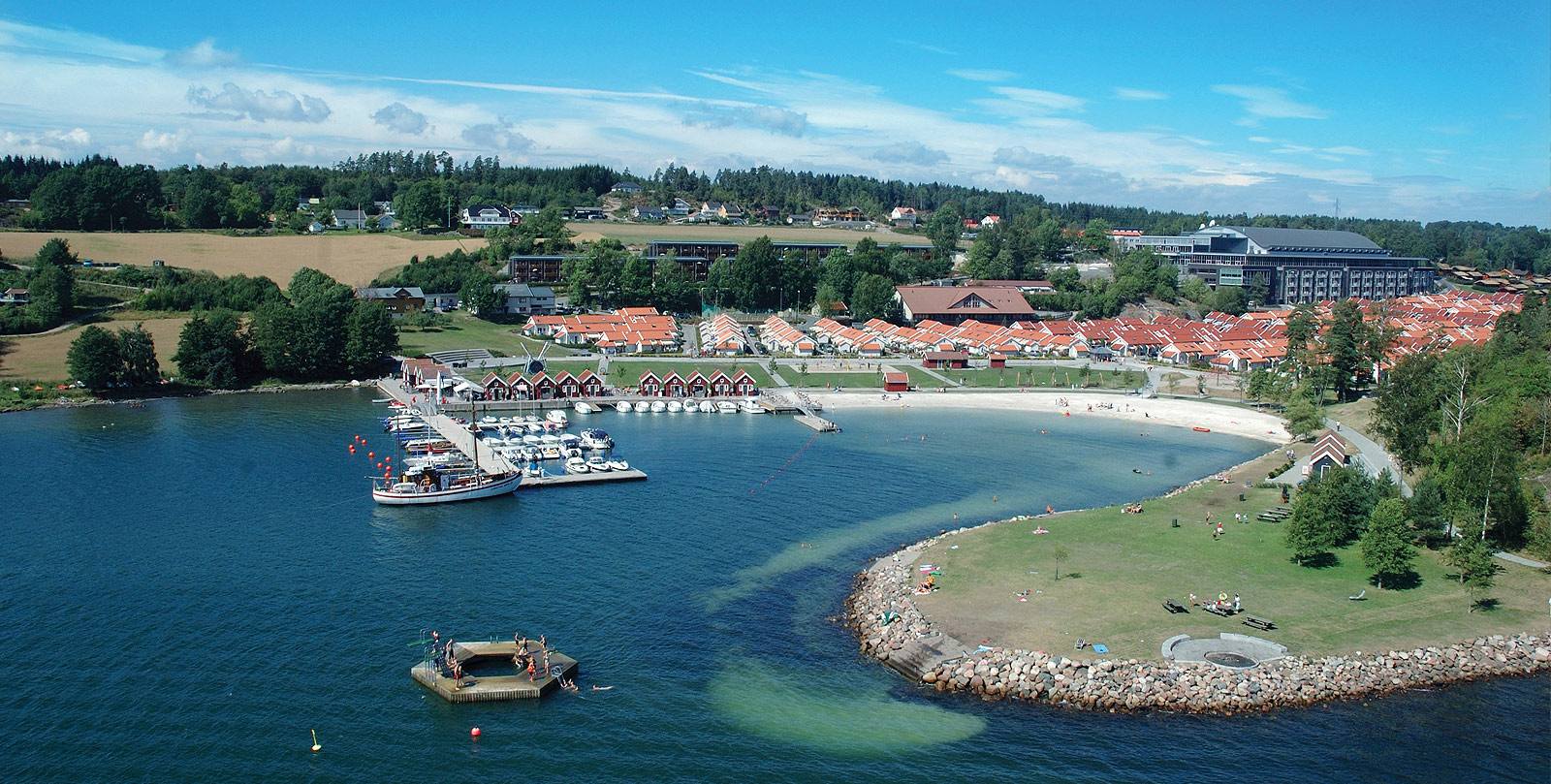
Brunstad Conference Center in Stokke.

Brunstad Christian Church (Smith's Friends) is an evangelical non-denominational church which was established in neighboring Horten Municipality in 1905. Brunstad Conference Center is the denomination's headquarters and is located in Stokke. It is the only worldwide denomination which was established in Norway.

The largest minority groups in 2017 (first- and second generation immigrants) are Lithuanians (1.95%), Polish (1.93%), Iraqis (1.24%), Vietnamese (0.80%), Germans (0.71%), Swedes (0.69%), Kosovans (0.67%), Bosnians (0.64%), and Danes (0.51%).

After the merger with Stokke and Andebu in 2017, Sandefjord has a population of over 63,000. This makes Sandefjord to the 11th most populous municipality in Norway. It is the most populous city in Vestfold County; One in four people from Vestfold county are from Sandefjord, or 25.2 percent of the county population.

== Economy ==
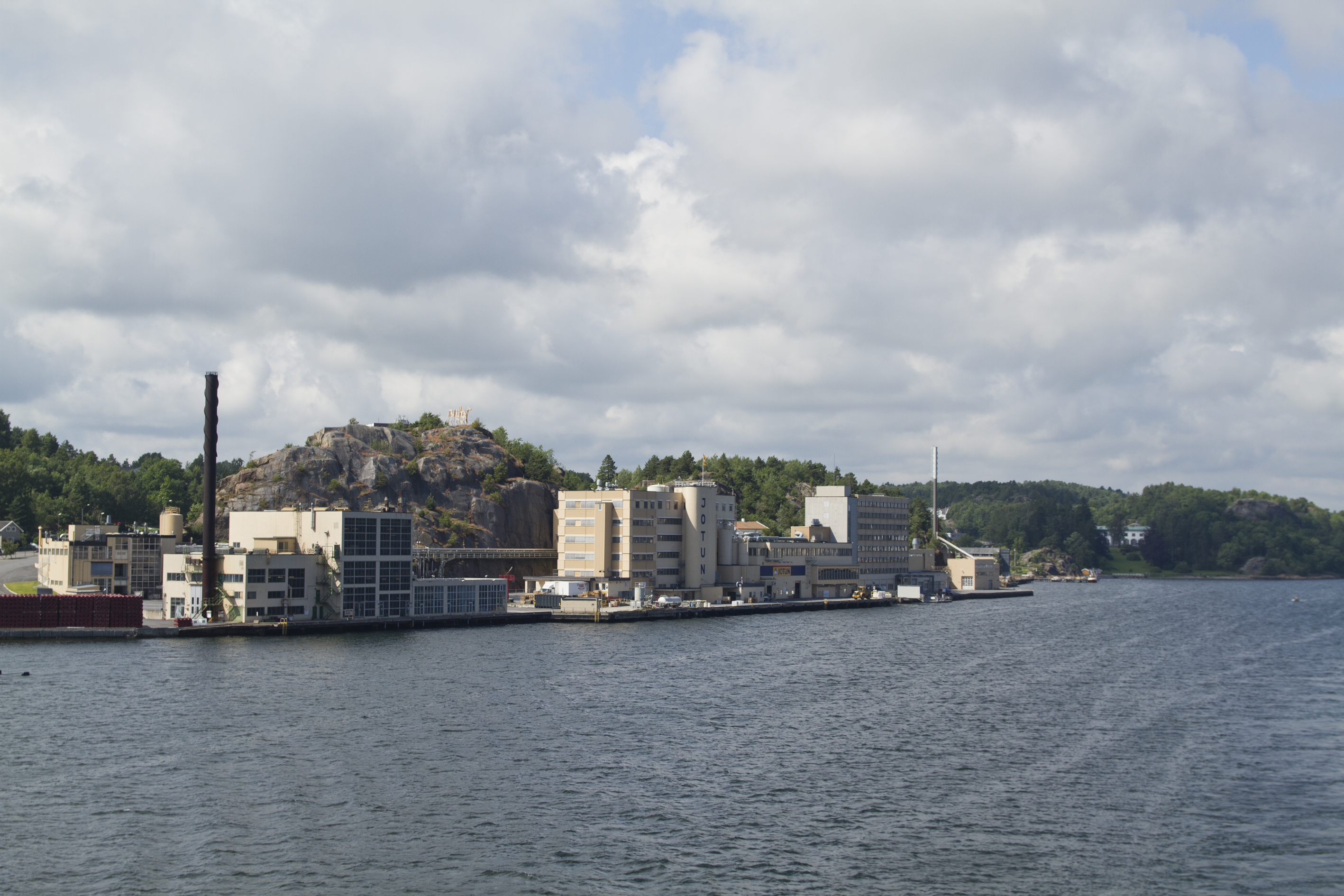
Jotun is one of the world's largest manufacturers of paints and coating products.

Sandefjord is the wealthiest municipality in Norway. Important industries in Sandefjord are information technology, chemical production, tourism, navigation, ship building and fishing. It is home to the international airport Torp Airport, paint producer Jotun, the brewery Grans Bryggeri, the chocolate factory Hval Sjokoladefabrikk, and the engineering company Ramboll Oil & Gas. High-tech and information technology have become important industries in recent times, represented by some of Norway's largest web shops: Komplett, mpx.no, and netshop.no.

The largest employer, besides the municipality itself, is Jotun, which was established in Sandefjord in 1926. Jotun is now one of the world's largest manufacturers of paints and coating products. As of February 2017, Jotun has a presence in over 100 countries and employed 9,500 employees worldwide. The Jotun Group operates four divisions, while its head office is located in Sandefjord. As of 2016, Jotun had 9,800 employees including one thousand employees within Norway. It operated 37 factories in 21 countries and is represented in 120 countries through distributors, offices, and agents. It is owned by the Gleditsch family and Orkla ASA.

While Jotun by far is the largest company in Vestfold county, the second-biggest company is Komplett. A web shop operating in all of Scandinavia, Komplett had a NOK 7.3 billion revenue in 2015 and had 800 employees.

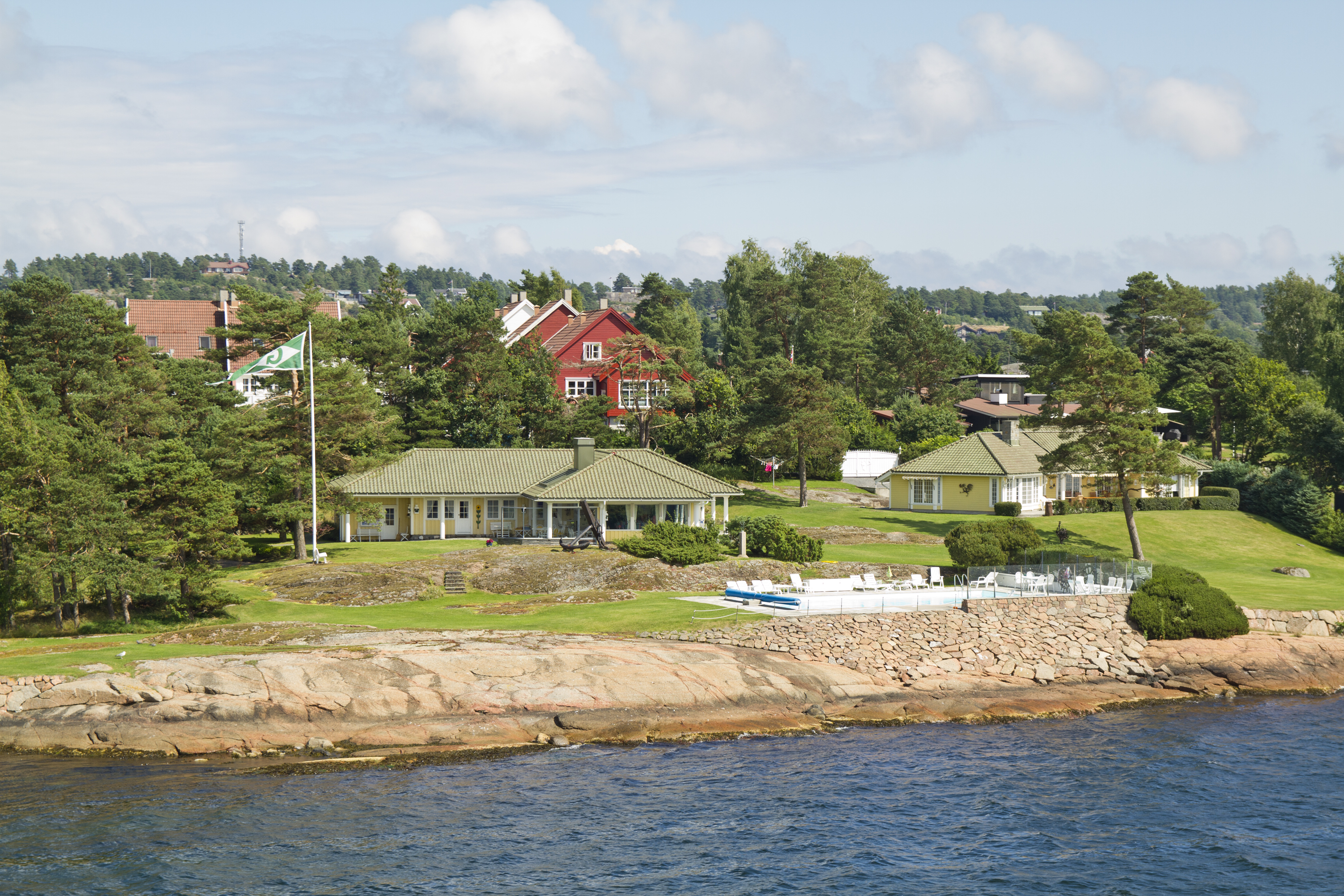
Seaside homes at Åsnes by Sandefjordsfjord

Sandefjord had Norway's most expensive seaside vacation homes as of 2011, with an average price of NOK 7.2 million. General property values in Sandefjord appreciated 25.7 percent between 2010 and 2015.

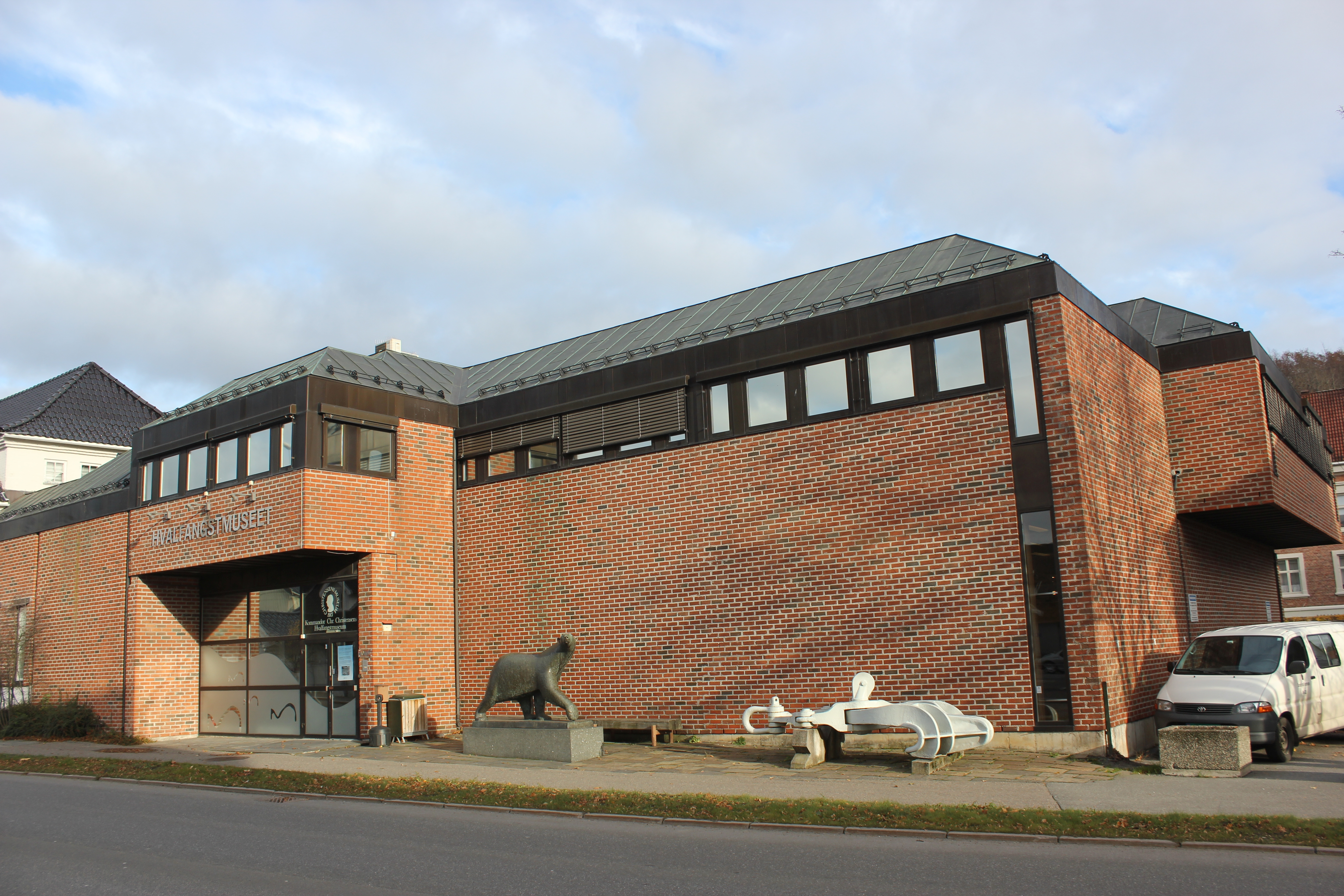
Sandefjord Whaling Museum has had over one million visitors as of 1994.

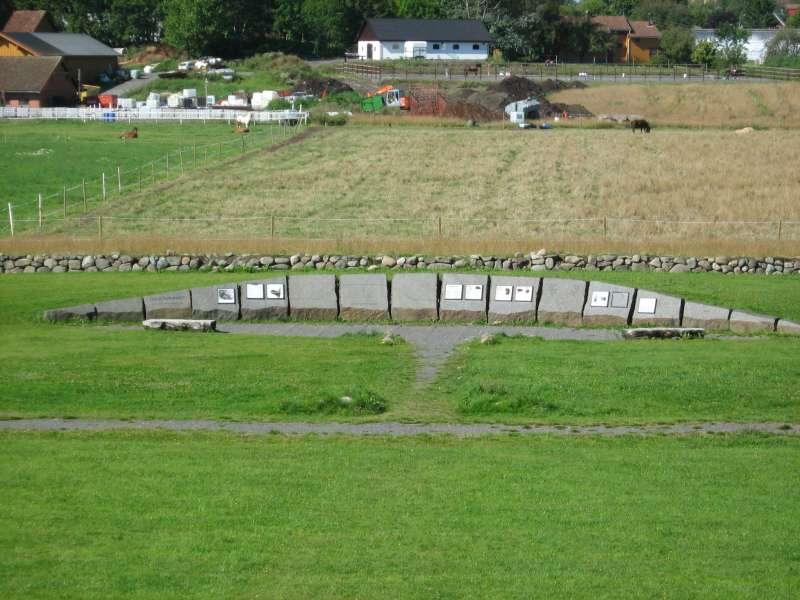
The bilingual interpretive sign at Gokstad Mound measures 23.5 metres (77 ft), symbolizing the Gokstad Ship's length.

The largest companies in Sandefjord based on operating income in 2015:

| No. | Company name | Operating income in 2015 (in NOK) |
|---|---|---|
| 1 | Jotun | 16,844,327,000 |
| 2 | Komplett | 7,256,700,000 |
| 3 | Skjeggerød AS | 4,523,277,000 |
| 4 | ALSO AS | 2,457,643,000 |
| 5 | Carlsen Fritzøe AS | 1,543,189,000 |

=== Tourism ===
Sandefjord is dubbed a resort area due to its many summer visitors. Sandefjord is also nicknamed the "Bathing City" due to its many beaches, islands and minor archipelagos. Beaches such as Vøra and nearby Langeby on Vesterøya attract summer visitors from Oslo and other larger Norwegian cities. Sandefjord became a bathing destination when sulphur was discovered in waters and gyttja in 1837.

Sandefjord is home to over two thousand vacation homes, most of which are built along the seaside. Sandefjord had Norway's most expensive vacation homes as of 2012; the mean vacation home price was NOK 7.1 million in 2012.

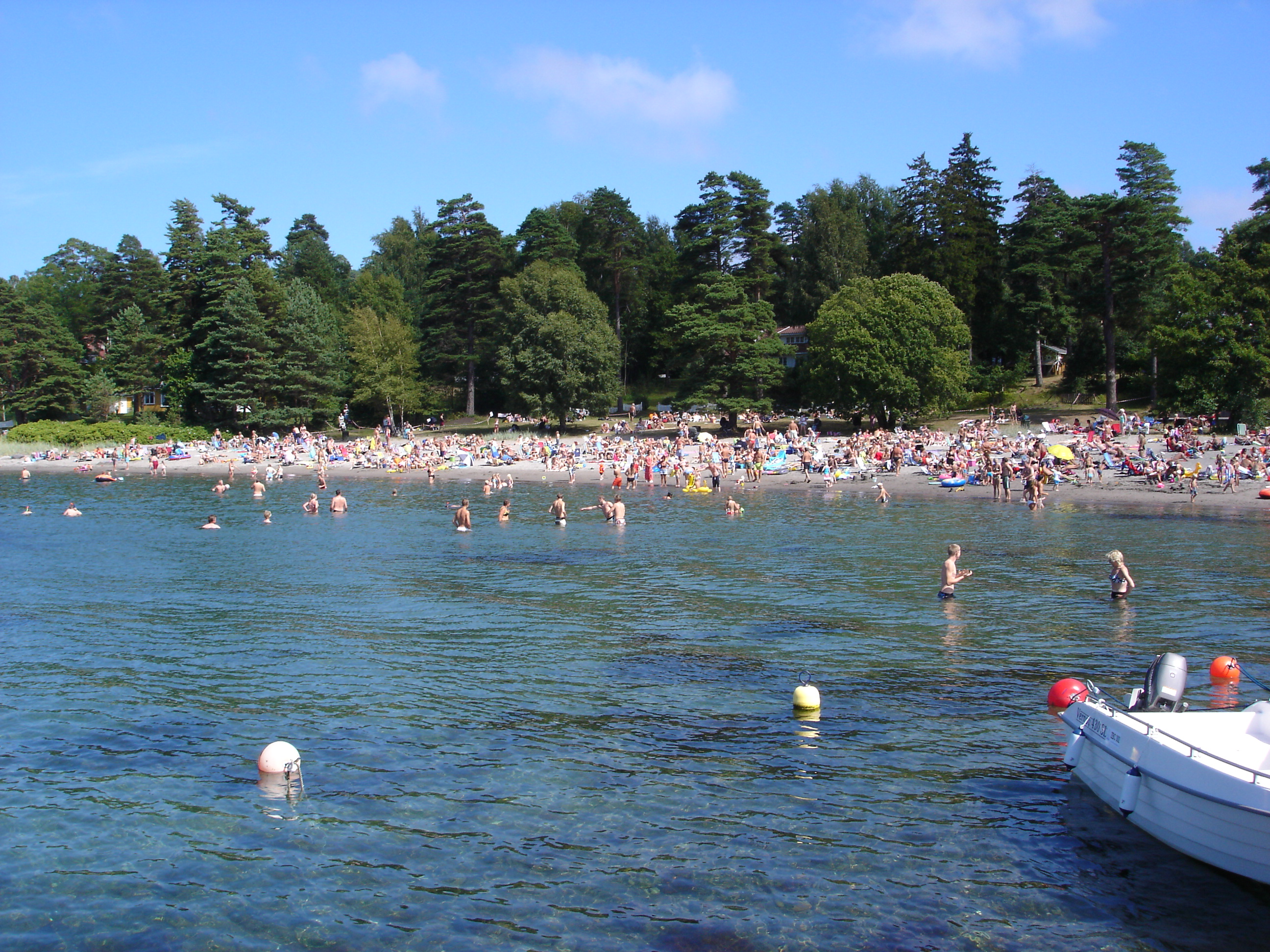
Vøra attracts tourists from all of Norway, and can be crowded during summer.

Sandefjord may be best known for its bathing and many beaches. The city of Sandefjord is in the southern part of the municipality and it lies on a low, slightly inclined strand, protected on three sides by hills, and only open towards the south where the Sandefjordsfjord is located. It is known for its great bathing and pure sea water quality. It has a country-like appearance with clean streets and quaint roads. The area is dependent on the beaches during the summer season when many tourists arrive in Sandefjord. The bathing season in Sandefjord generally begins on the first of June and runs through the last day of August.

Visitors to Sandefjord Spa in the 19th century were the first tourists to the area, and this made Sandefjord into a popular holiday destination. Sandefjord's fame as a seaside mecca dates back to 1837, when sulphur springs first were discovered in town. Sandefjord has been nicknamed "Eastern Norway's vacation paradise". A majority of current tourists and vacation homeowners are from the capital of Oslo.

Sandefjord is home to four hotels: Scandic Park Hotel, Hotel Kong Carl, Torp Hotel, and Clarion Collection Hotel Atlantic.

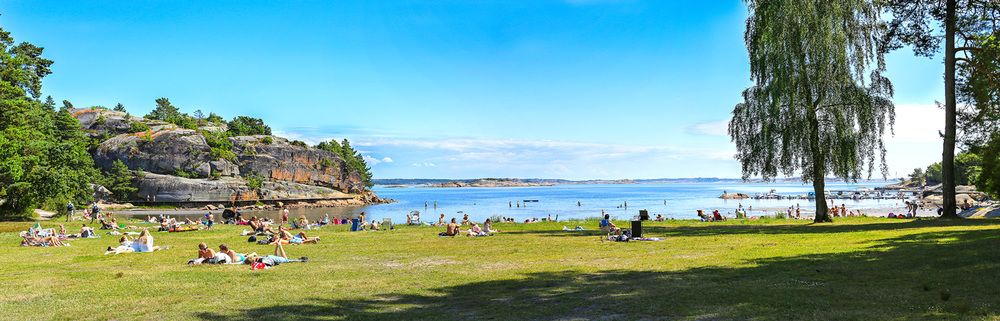
Skjellvika Beach

== Culture ==
Number of immigrants (1st and 2nd generation) in Sandefjord by country of origin in 2017
| Ancestry | Number |
|---|---|
| Lithuania | 1,121 |
| Poland | 1,111 |
| Iraq | 733 |
| Vietnam | 504 |
| Sweden | 429 |
| Germany | 423 |
| Kosovo | 408 |
| Bosnia and Herzegovina | 394 |
| Denmark | 319 |
| Syria | 298 |
| Somalia | 250 |
| Philippines | 207 |
| Thailand | 191 |
| United Kingdom | 189 |
| Afghanistan | 182 |

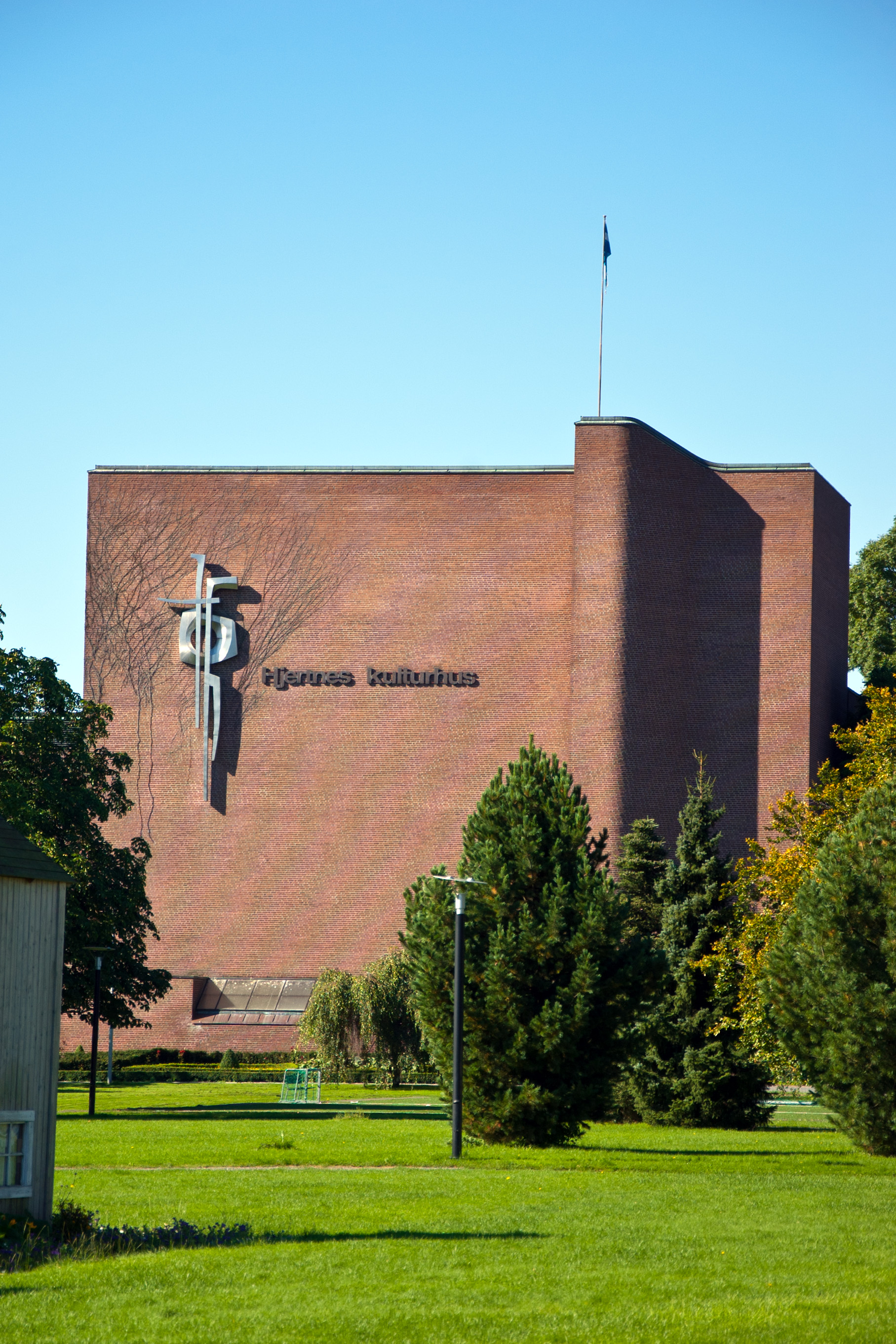
Hjertnes Civic and Theater Center

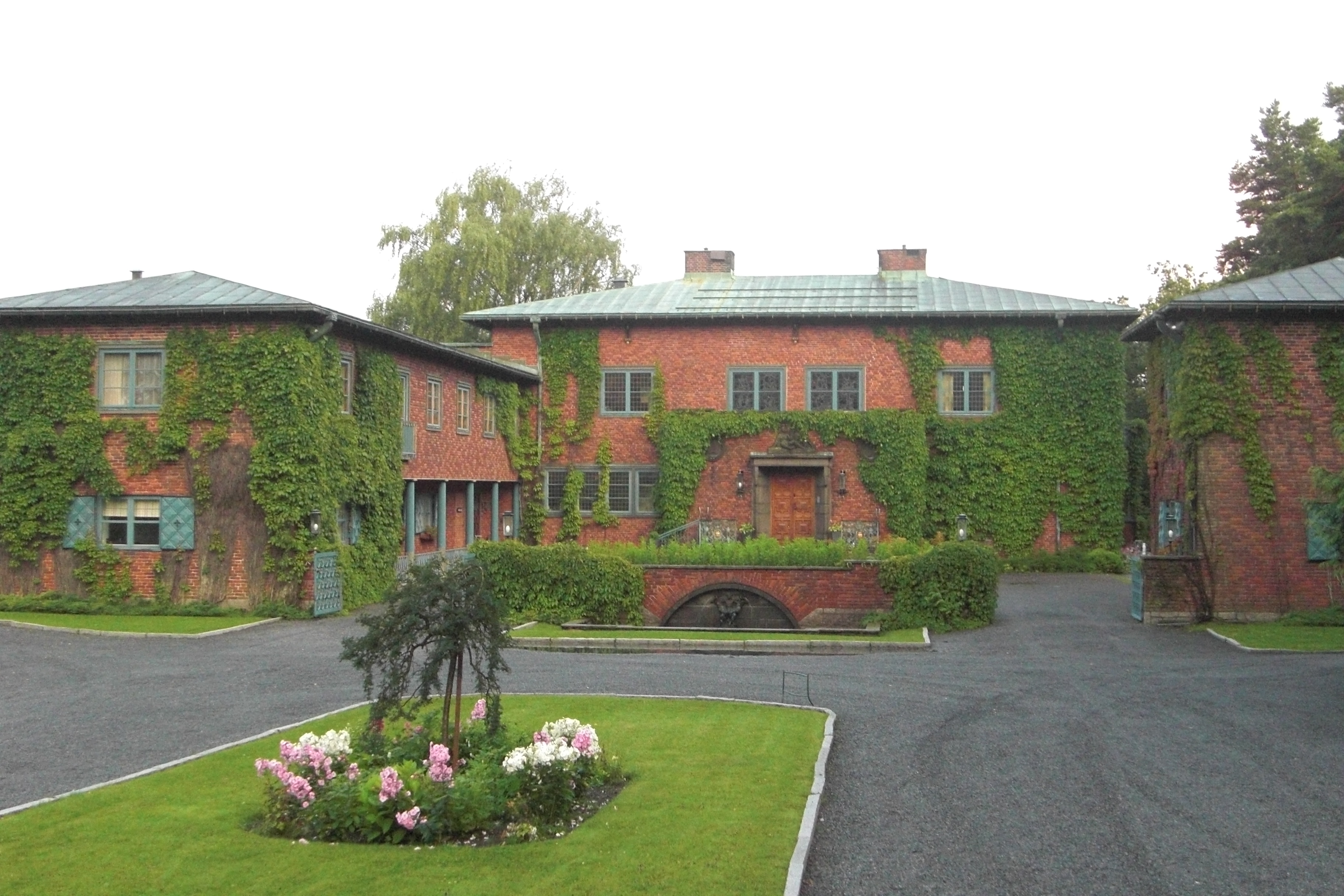
Former villa of Anders Jahre at Midtåsen

The 9th century Gokstad Ship was discovered in Sandefjord during an 1880 excavation led by Nicolay Nicolaysen. The ship itself, which is now at the Viking Ship Museum in Oslo, was built around year 910. It is the largest preserved Viking ship in Norway. A Viking chieftain was buried at the Gokstad Mound (Gokstadhaugen), along with the 23.5 metres (77 ft) Gokstad Ship. Interpretive signs have been put up at the Gokstad Mound on Helgerødveien.

Sandefjord has four churches remaining from the Middle Ages: Høyjord Stave Church, Kodal Church, Skjee Church, and Andebu Church. While Andebu Church has Norway's oldest parish register (dated 1623), Høyjord Stave Church is the only stave church left in Vestfold county. Its chancel dates to the year 1100 and is the oldest part of the church. Burial mounds dating to the Viking Age can be seen around the church. Sandar Church by Sandefjord Station was constructed atop of the ruins of a medieval church dated to the 13th century. The present church, however, was erected in 1792.

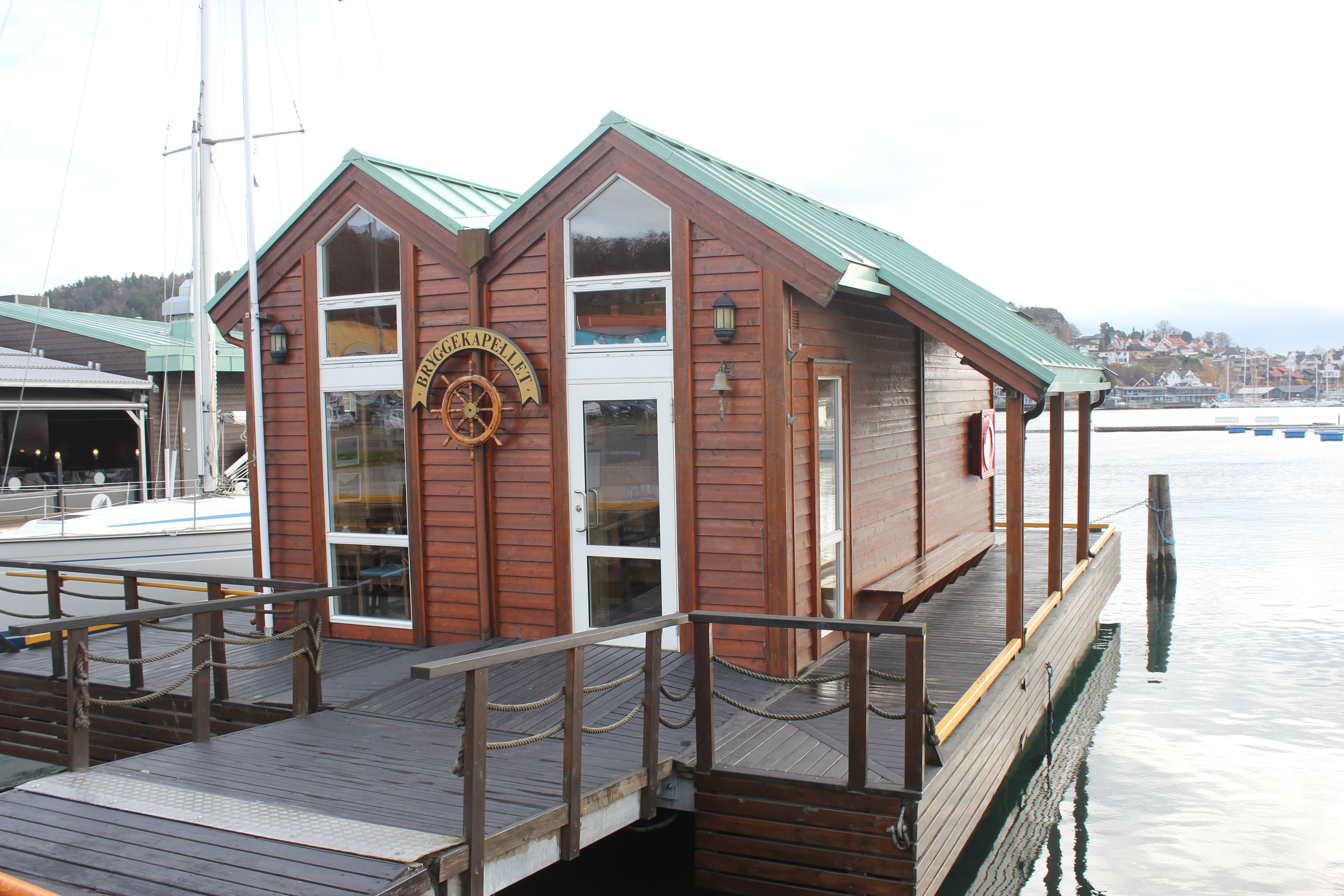
Harbour Chapel a floating church

Midtåsen Sculpture Park contains a collection of bronze and marble works by sculptor Knut Steen, which is housed in a pine forest pavilion overlooking Sandefjord and the Sandefjordsfjord. The former estate of shipping magnate Anders Jahre is located at Midtåsen, and is now owned by the municipality. Guided tours of the villa are available. The villa was designed by architect Arnstein Arneberg. It is located in a 60-decare (15-acre) park.

Hjertnes Civic and Theater Center is home to three auditoriums and an outdoor amphitheater. A movie theater, City Hall and library are found at Hjertnes. Concerts, opera, and other cultural events also take place at Hjertnes Civic Center.

=== Art ===
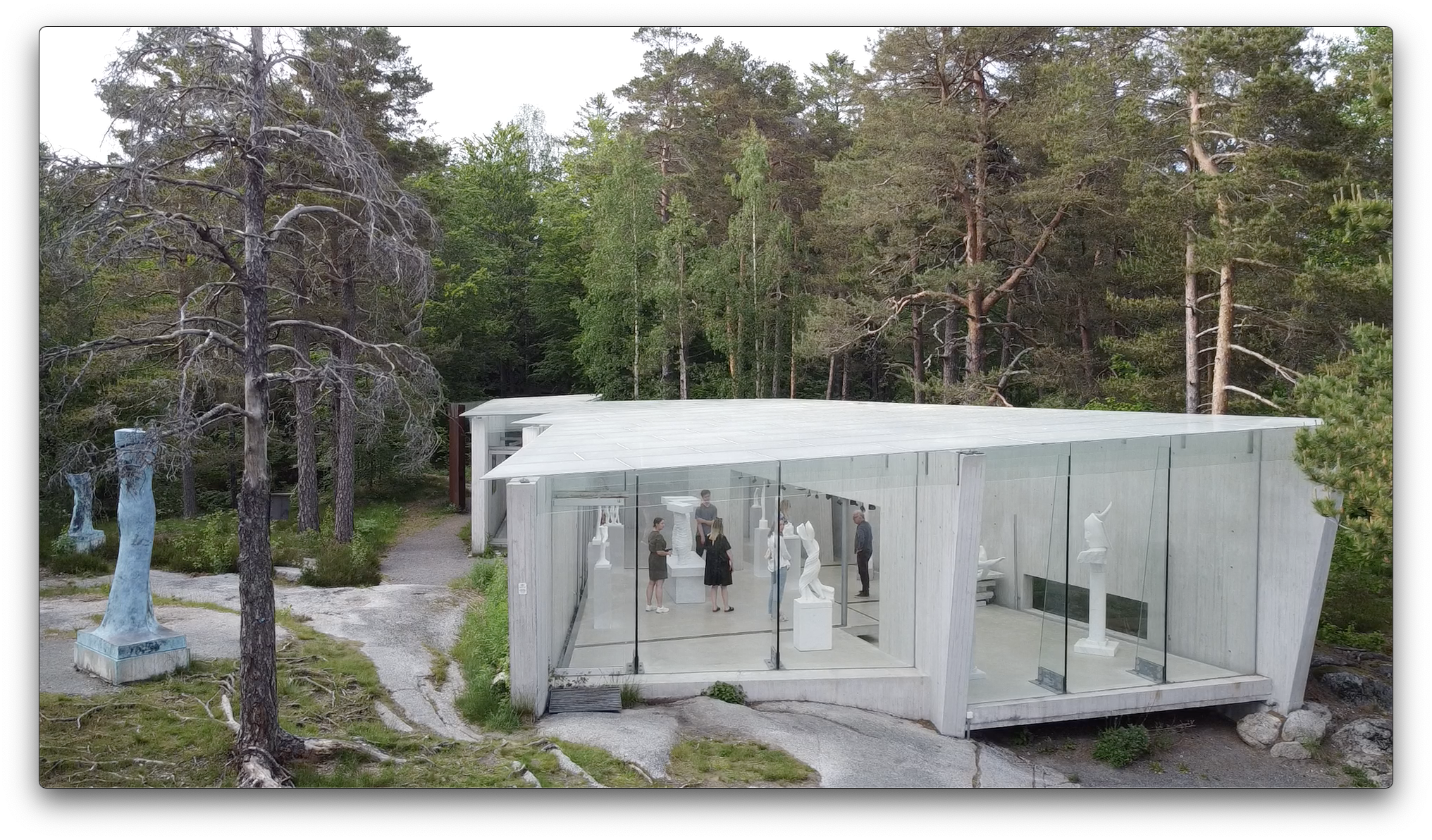
The Sculpture pavilion at Midtåsen Sculpture Park.

Sandefjord is the city in Norway with the most sculptures per inhabitant. There are around 100 sculptures from over 50 artists and sculptors including Ørnulf Bast, Nils Aas, Dagfin Werenskiold, Knut Steen, Per Krogh, and others. Notable sculptures include the Whaler's Monument and the Sea Queen (Havdronningen) by Arnold Haukeland, which is located outside Hjertnes Civic and Theater Center. Midtåsen Sculpture Park contains a collection of bronze and marble works by Knut Steen in a park and villa designed by Arnstein Arneberg. Poseidon Sculpture Park, which is located in Badeparken, features Greek mythology sculptures by Nina Sundbye. Arne Durban's sculpture "Mother and Child" is located in the City Park (“Byparken”), while a sculpture of priest Magnus Brostrup Landstad made by Hans Holmen can be seen at Landstads plass by Sandar Church. A polar bear sculpture by Skule Waksvik is located outside Sandefjord Museum, while a whale jawbone arch is placed outside Scandic Park Hotel. A memorial to fallen sailors (Sjømannsminnesmerket) was placed outside Sandefjord Church in 1920 and was made by sculptor Gustav Lærum.

The fountain at Christopher Hvidts Plass, the Thaulow fountain, was donated to the city in 1875 by Heinrich Arnold Thaulow, the city's first physician and founder of Sandefjord Spa. It is the city's oldest sculpture and its first donation.

In 2017, the NGO Art for All in the World conducted a project where seven mural artists contributed. A mural by Eduardo Kobra, “Peace between nations”, can be seen behind Peter Grøns gate 2B. Street art by graffiti artist Victor Ash can be seen at Stockfeldsgate 6-8.

=== Museums ===
Sandefjord is home to Europe's only museum dedicated to whaling, which is located in the city center. The museum was one of the first original museums in Norway when established in 1917. Today it boasts over 150,000 photographs as well as exhibits of marine animals, a restored whale catcher, and more. A whale catcher named Southern Actor is docked at Museum's Wharf and is a part of the Maritime Museum. It is the only whale catcher from the Modern Whaling Epoch still to be in its original working order. It was constructed by Sevilla Whaling Co. in 1950 and brought to Sandefjord in 1989. Museum's Wharf ("Museumsbrygga") was established in 1995 and both the Gaia ship and Southern Actor were placed at the wharf.

There are six protected buildings in Sandefjord as of 2008: City Museum (Bymuseet), Maritime Museum (Sjøfartsmuséet), and the three farms Elverhøy, Nordby, and Auve farms. The city's oldest house, which is located at Skippergaten 6 and was built in 1667, is also one of the city's protected structures. The City Museum and Maritime Museum, along with Sandefjord Museum, are the three museums found in Sandefjord. Sandefjord Museum is among the world's largest whaling museums. It was established in 1917 and was a gift to the city from Lars Christensen.

== Transportation ==
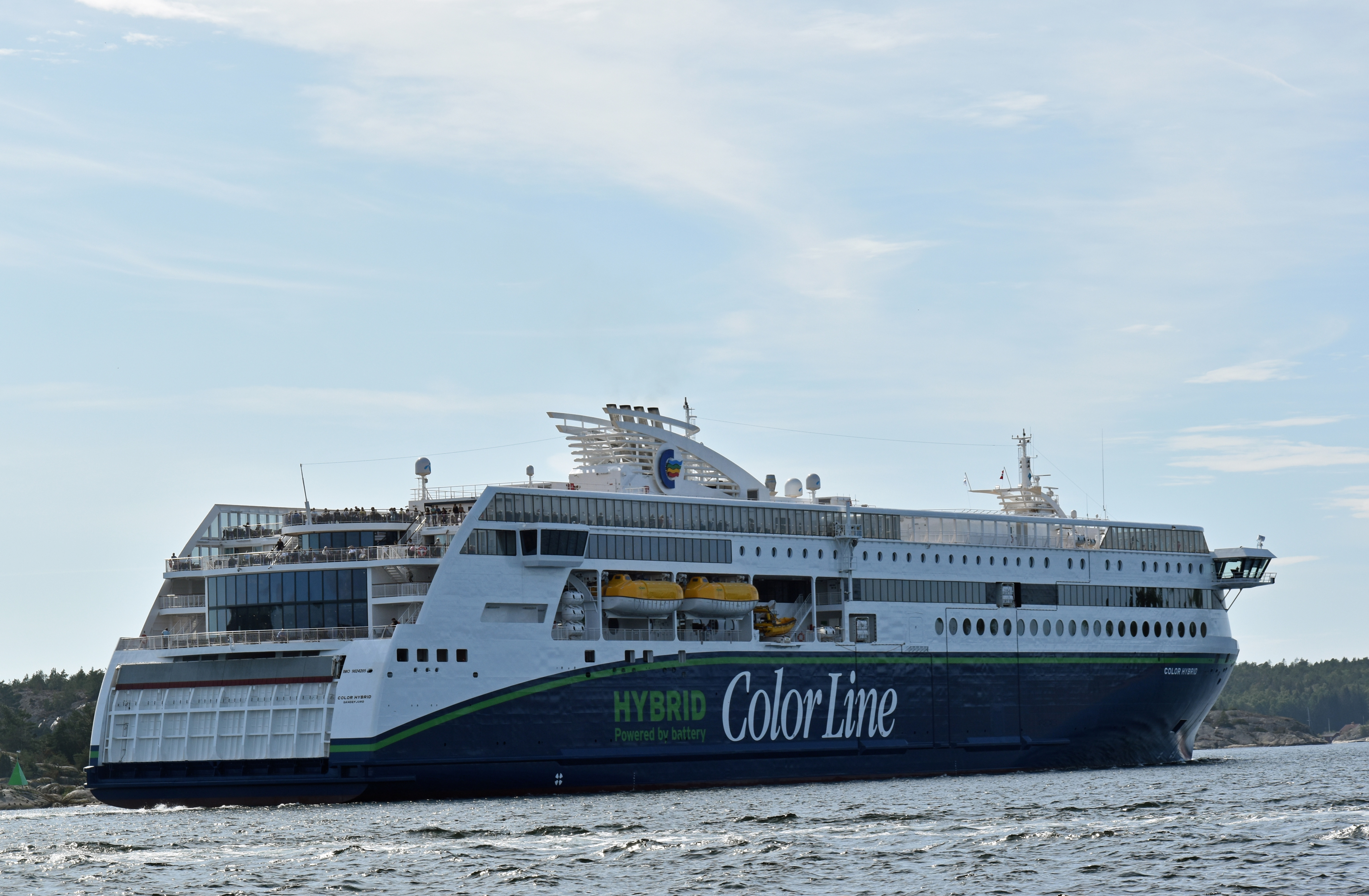
The NOK 1.1 billion Color Hybrid is the world's largest hybrid ship.

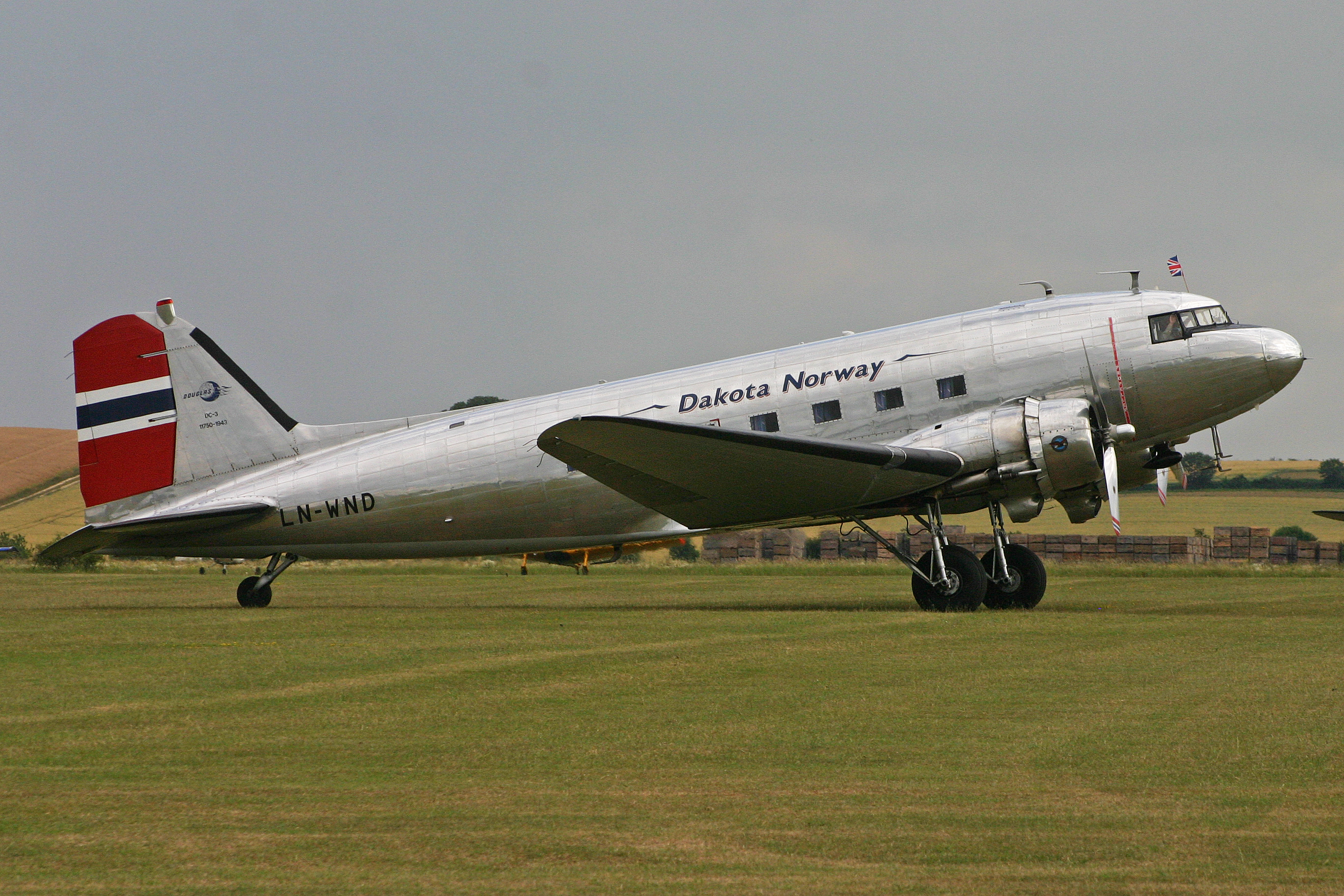
Dakota Norway, Norway's only Douglas DC-3.

Sandefjord Airport Torp is one of Norway's largest airports, and is particularly known for its high number of international flights. Torp is Norway's second-largest airport in terms of international flights in 2003. As of 2003, Torp had over one million annual passengers, of which around 50% were for international flights. Despite being located about 110 kilometres (68 mi) south of Oslo, Torp is sometimes called Oslo Airport Torp. It is reached with a free shuttle bus from Sandefjord Airport Station which is located along the Vestfoldbanen railway line.

Sandefjord Airport is a budget airline hub for airlines such as Widerøe, Ryanair and Wizz Air. Torp offers direct routes to over 30 international and domestic destinations, including daily flights to European cities such as London and Amsterdam. Sandefjord is served by frequent intercity trains to Oslo and onwards to Oslo Airport.

Daily ferries connect Sandefjord to Sweden. Color Line ferries Color Hybrid and Color Viking connect the town to Strömstad in Sweden. Fjord Line is another ferry service connecting Sandefjord and Sweden. The neighboring town of Larvik is home to daily ferry operations between Norway and Hirtshals, Denmark. Scandi Line was a former ferry service operating ferries between Sandefjord and Sweden. Sandefjord is also home to a domestic ferry route: MF Jutøya transports people and goods to the nearby island of Veierland from Engø peninsula several times per day. Sandefjord is also a cruise ship destination.

European route E18 traverses the municipality. It is one of Norway's most important main roads, and makes the drive to Oslo approximately 90 minutes.

=== Public transit ===
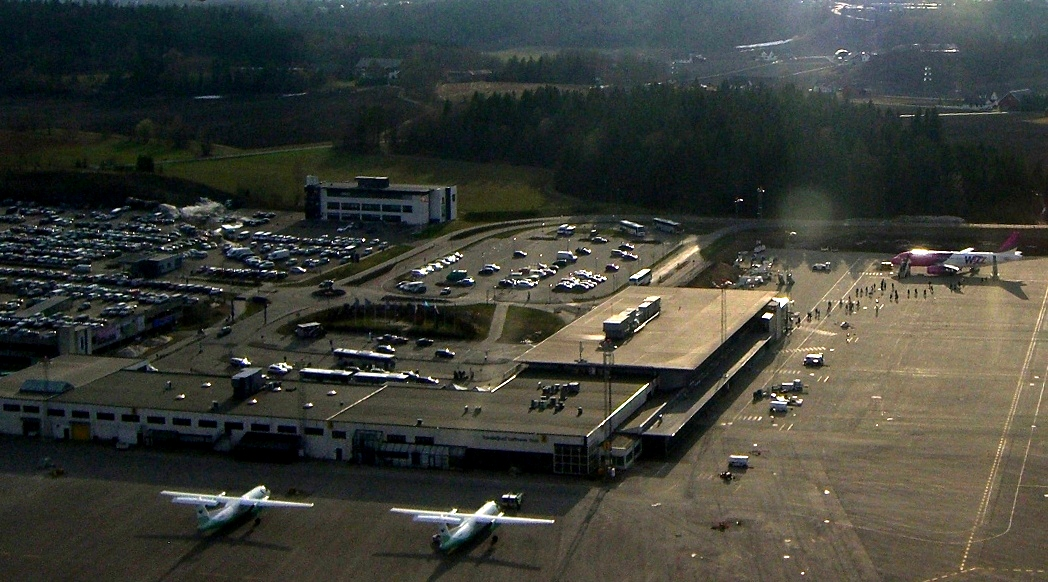
Only Bergen- and Oslo Airports have more international flights than Torp Airport.

Sandefjord Station is the central train station and is served by regional trains operated by Vy. The main bus station is also located by Sandefjord Station. Fast and frequent express buses from Sandefjord shuttle along the European route E18 highway, connecting to Kristiansand and linking key resorts in Southern Norway. Trains and buses for Sandefjord leave Oslo Central Station (Oslo S) every 30 minutes, and the journey takes two hours. The public transportation system in Sandefjord is known as Vestfold Kollektivtrafikk (VKT).

Besides Sandefjord Station, additional railway stations include Sandefjord Airport Station and Stokke Station. Torp Express Bus Service operates buses from Sandefjord Airport to Oslo. There are free shuttle buses between Sandefjord Airport Station and Sandefjord Airport.

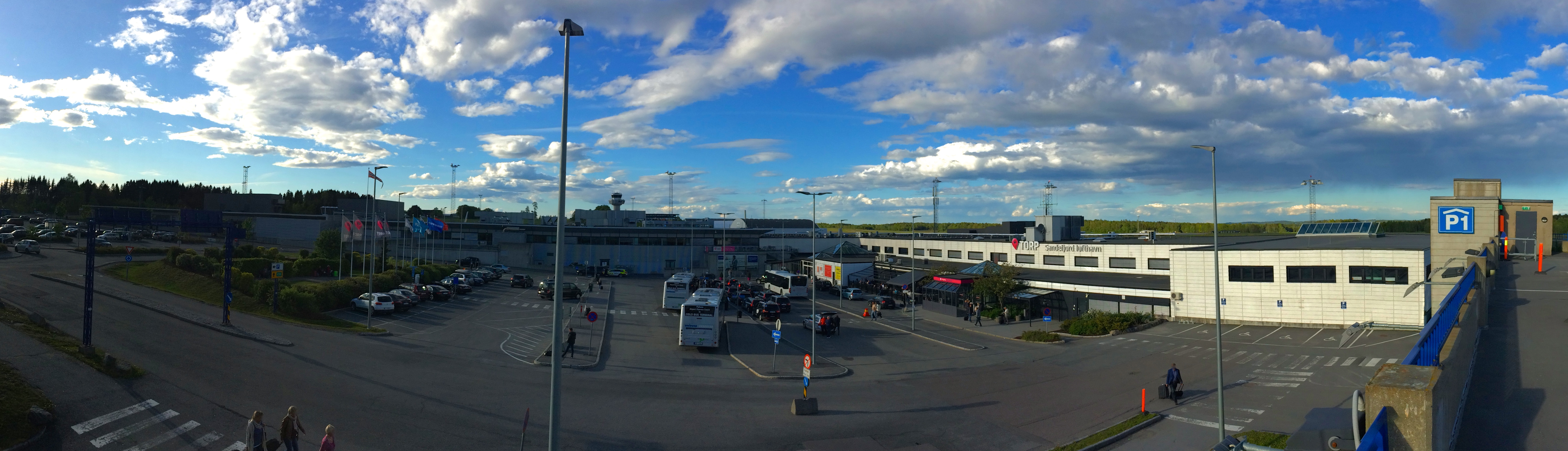
Sandefjord Airport Torp is one of Norway's largest airports.

== Sport ==
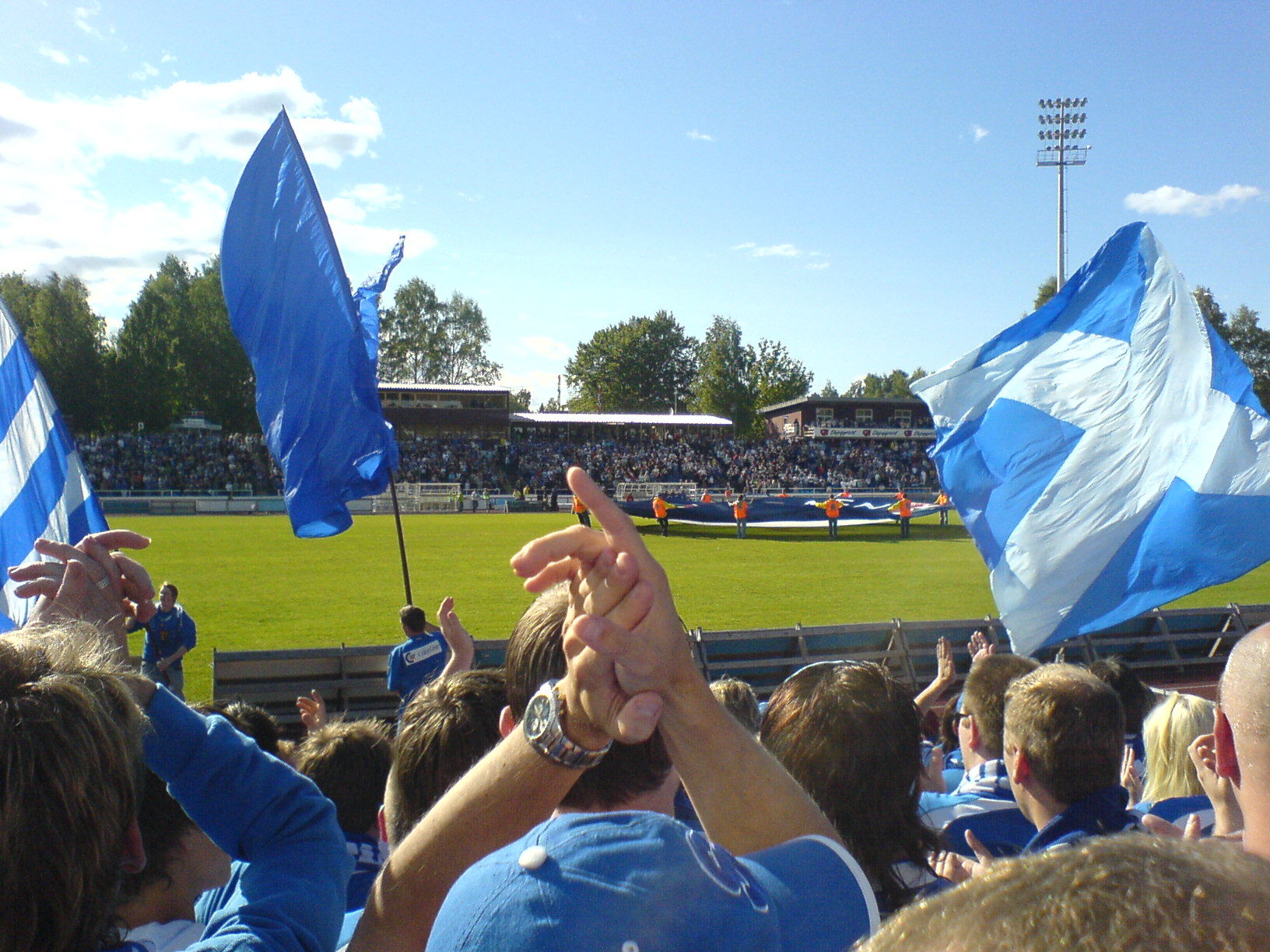
Sandefjord Fotball at Storstadion.

Bugårds Park is the sits of Sandefjord's largest sporting grounds and facilities, including areas for soccer, tennis, frisbee golf, handball, badminton, archery, rollerskating, horseback-riding, water sports, ice hockey, and ice skating. The 60-acre (24 ha) park sits by Sandefjord High School and is also home to a walking path, duck pond and designated picnic areas. The swimming center with its 2,500-square-metre (27,000 sq ft) public pool is also located in Bugårds Park. Indoor handball courts are housed in Jotunhallen, while tennis courts are found in Pingvinhallen.

Sandefjord Golfbane is an 18-hole golf course located at Jåberg, about 5-kilometre (3.1 mi) from the city center. It was designed by Peter Chamberlin. It was established in August 2009.

=== Professional sports ===
Sandefjord Fotball is a professional football club which plays in Tippeligaen/Eliteserien (Norwegian Premier League). The team previously played home games at Storstadion, but has played at Komplett Arena since its opening in 2007. The club reached the Norwegian First Division in 1999, the year after its foundation.

Sandefjord is noted for its strong performance in professional handball. Sandefjord is home to two top league handball teams: Sandefjord TIF and IL Runar. From 1991 to 2008 Sandefjord TIF won nine Men's Premier League and another local team, Runar Håndball, won four. Sandefjord TIF Handball won the Men's Premier League again in 2005–2006.

In professional ice skating, Sandefjord has been the location of Norwegian Allround Championships in 1928, 1958, and 1961.

The Gamle Stadion hosted motorcycle speedway around the pitch during the 1970s and held the final of the Norwegian Individual Speedway Championship in 1972.

== Education ==
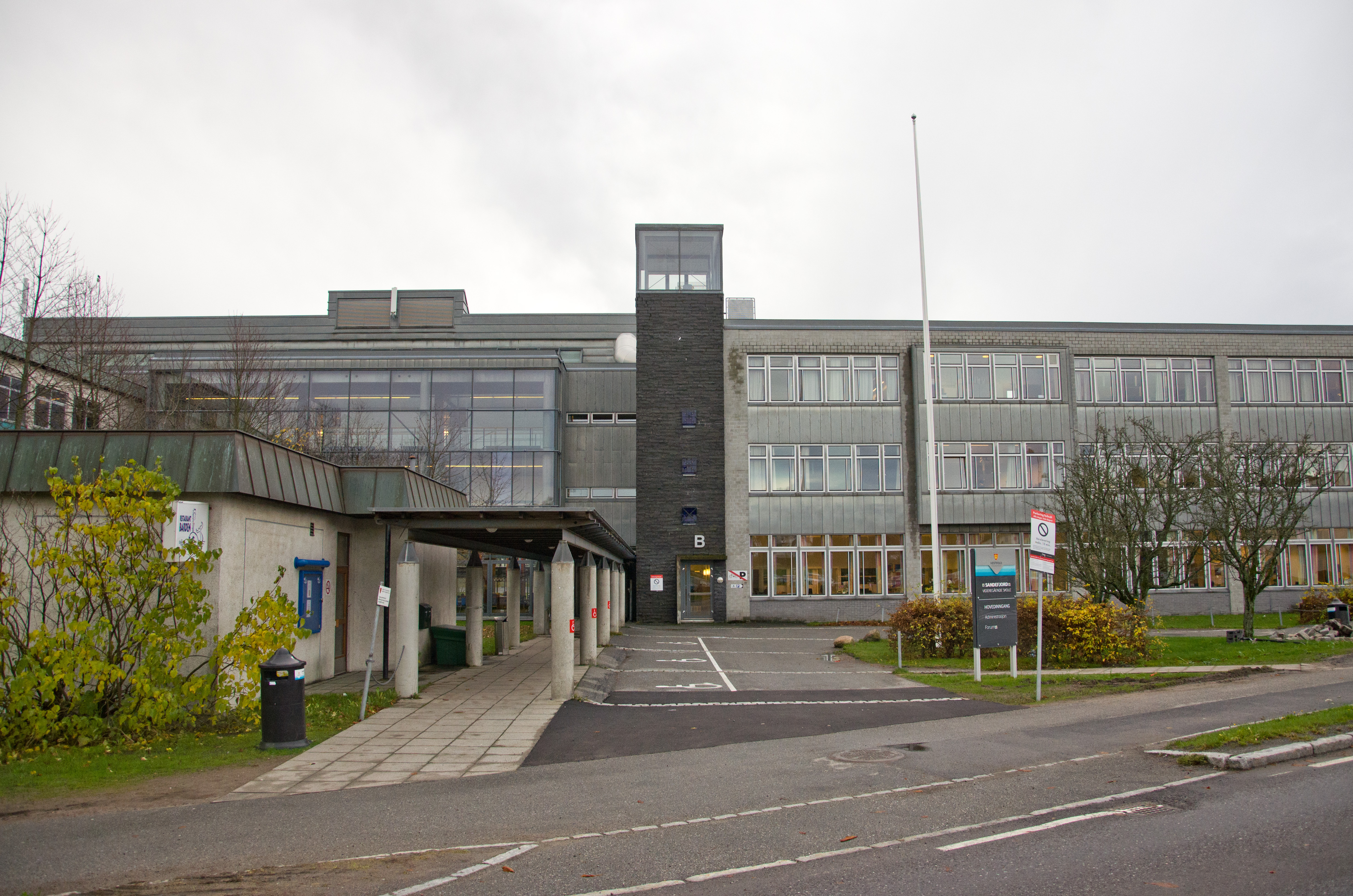
Sandefjord High School is the largest in Norway.

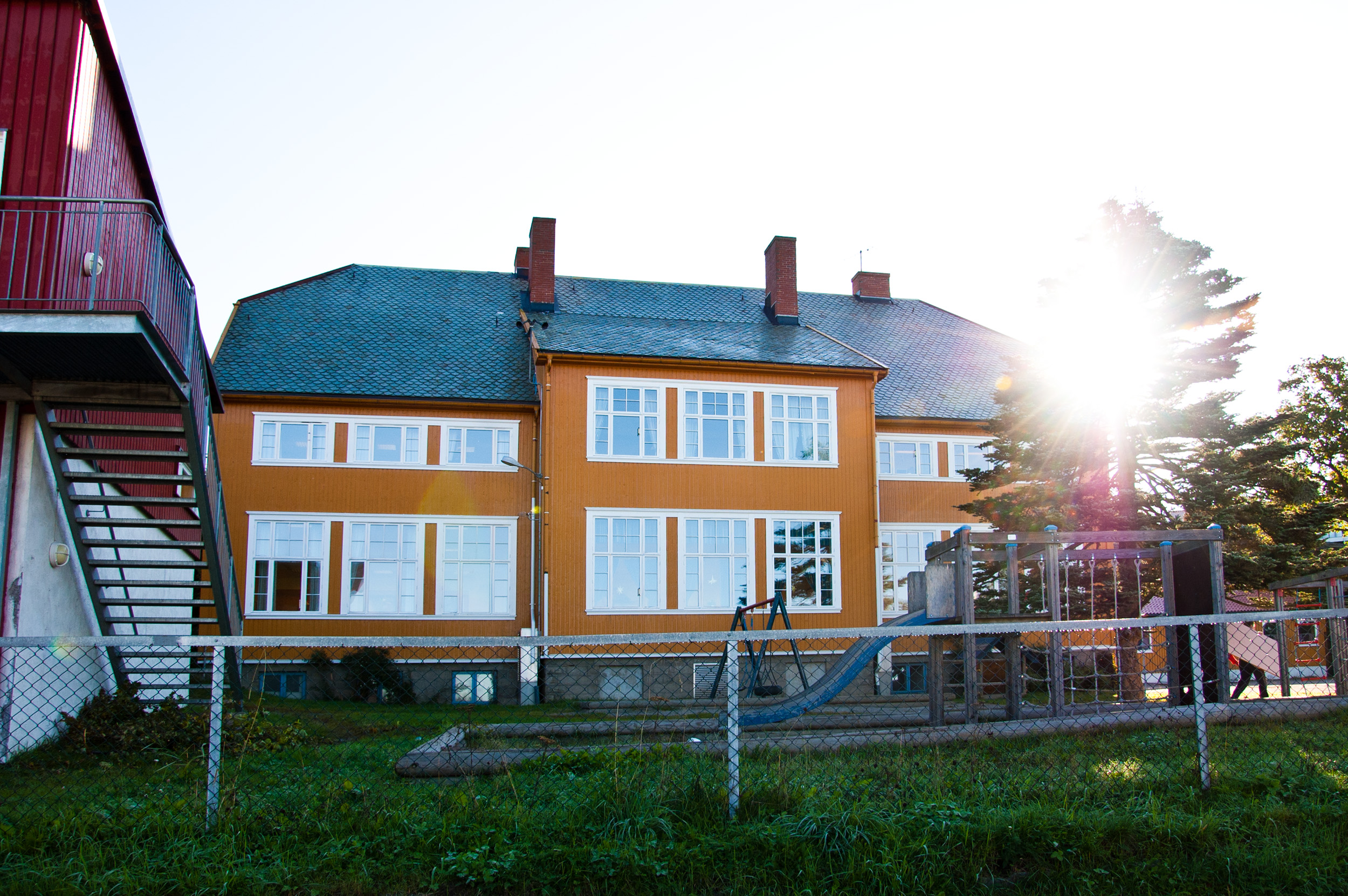
Framnes Elementary School

Sandefjord High School (SVGS) has about 2,000 students and is Norway's largest high school. It is a result of the merge between Sandefjord's four former high schools. Skagerak International School is also located in town and offers English-speaking kindergarten, elementary school, middle school, and high school. Other private schools include Moe School and Mokollen School. Skiringssal folkehøyskole is a folk high school in Sandefjord, which is owned by Vestfold county. There are six public middle schools in Sandefjord: Andebu, Breidablikk, Bugården, Ranvik, Stokke, and Varden middle schools. There are 21 public elementary schools in the municipality as well.

Sandefjord High School (SVGS) and its two-story 32,000-square-metre (340,000 sq ft) facilities are located at Krokemoa near the Bugårds Park. It is a public International Baccalaureate World School, but also offers general academics (the college preparatory studiespesialisering of the Norwegian school system), as well as elite sports, vocational education, and more.

Skagerak International School is a private, English-language, International Baccalaureate World School at Framnes. Its education is offered to both international and Norwegian students. Established as a High School in 1991, the school expanded to include a kindergarten as well as primary and middle schools in 2000. The basis of the education is formed by the International Baccalaureate Primary Years (PYP), Middle Years (MYP) and Diploma (DP) programs. Skagerak is located in a renovated shipyard on the waterfront at Framnes. Camps and excursions are offered for all primary and middle school students, as well as two or more annual trips abroad. High school students travel abroad for cultural and service-oriented trips, mostly to areas in Europe, Central Asia, and Africa. The High School is a member of UNESCO's SOUL project.

As of 2018, 250 students are enrolled at Pilot Flight Academy at Torp Airport.

== Points of interest ==
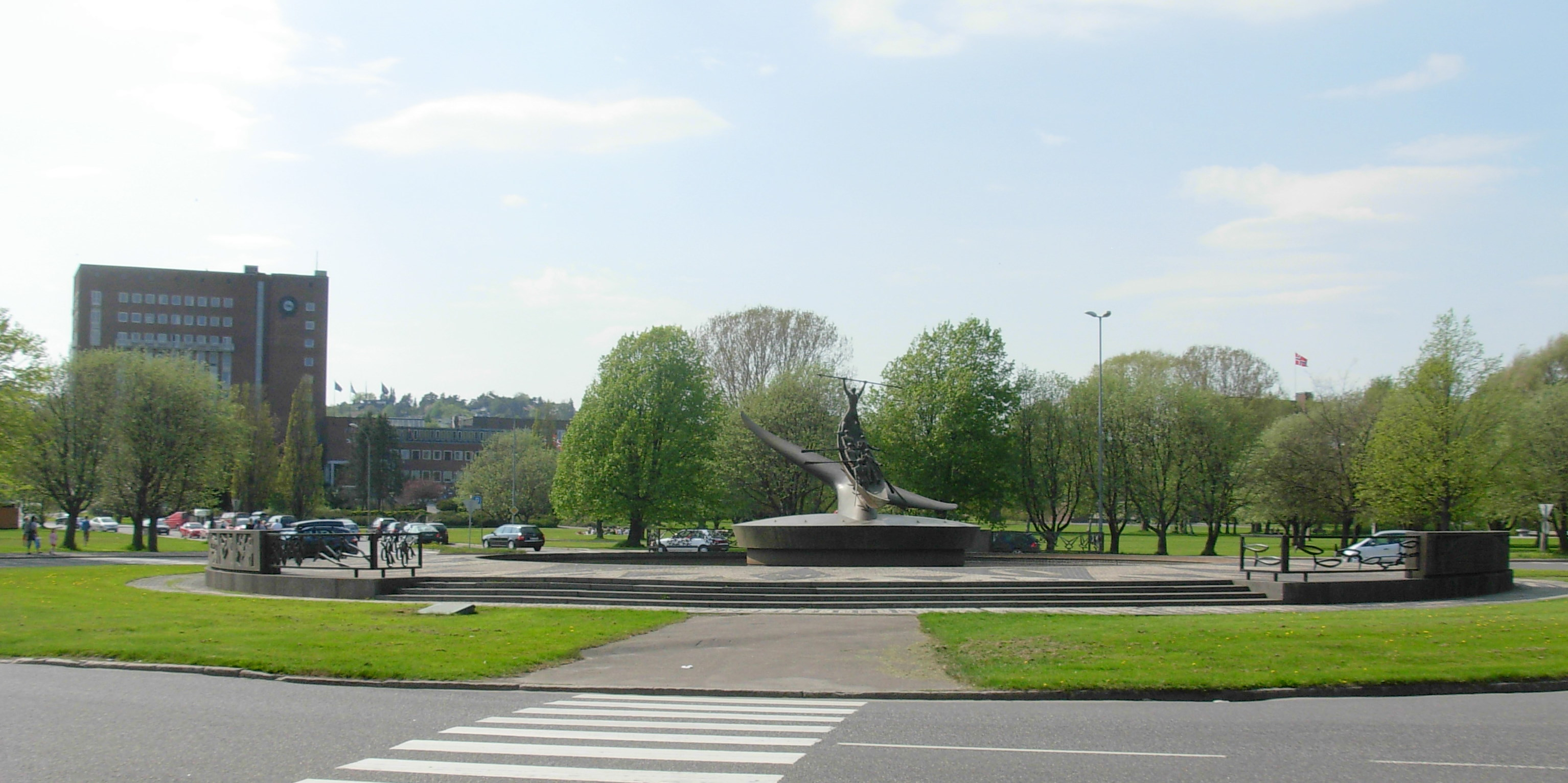
Whaler's Monument with Scandic Park Hotel seen on the left

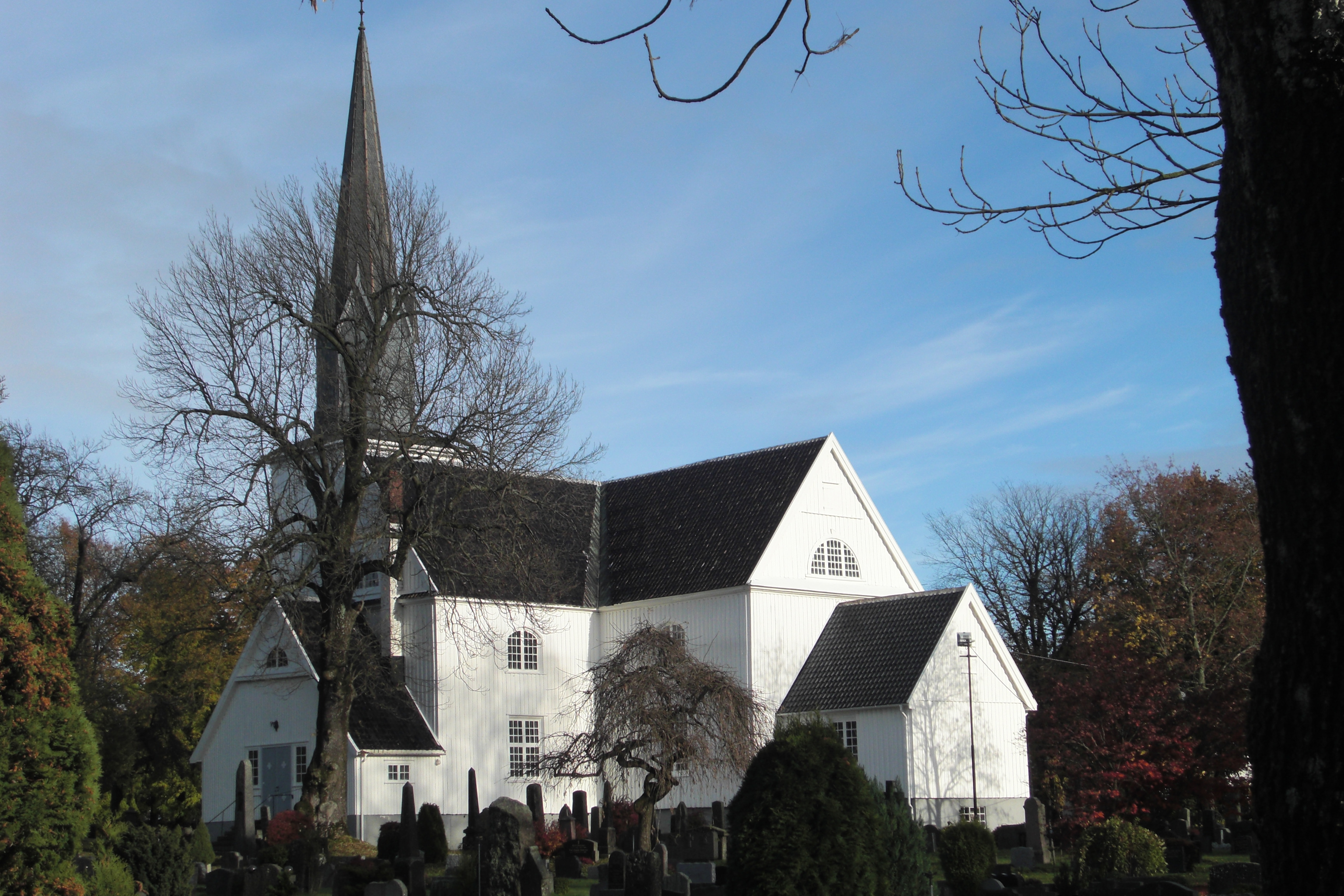
Sandar Church was consecrated in 1792.

Notable points of interest include:

- Gokstad Burial Mound, site of the discovery of the 9th-century Gokstad Ship.
- Sandefjord Museum (the Whaling Museum), Europe's only museum dedicated to the whaling industry.
  - Gaia ship, 1990 replica of the Gokstad Ship at Museum's Wharf in Sandefjord Harbor.
  - Southern Actor, whale-catcher turned museum ship. Only whale catcher from the Modern Whaling Epoch still to be in its original working order.
- Whaler's Monument, rotating bronze monument, erected in honor of pioneering whalers
- Sandefjord Spa (Kurbadet), the 1899 thermal baths are housed in one of Scandinavia's largest wooden buildings.
- Bjerggata, one of the oldest parts of the city of Sandefjord with preserved wooden houses.
- Hjertnes Civic and Theater Center, adjacent to Badeparken and Scandic Park Hotel.
- Sandar Church, built on ruins of a 13th-century medieval stone church. Present church was erected in 1792.
- Sandefjord Church, 1903 church, home of Sandefjord Church Bells and host of various concerts and events.
- Høyjord Stave Church, in Høyjord, only preserved stave church in Vestfold County.
- Hvaltorvet Shopping Centre, largest shopping mall in Sandefjord, located in the city center.
- Harbour Chapel ("Bryggekapellet"), Europe's only floating church.
- Folehavna Fort, ruins from a German fortress constructed in 1941 during the German occupation of Norway.
- Sundås Fort, ruins from fortifications constructed in 1899 during the Union between Sweden and Norway.
- Istrehågan, ancient burial ground which dates to the Roman Iron Age around 1500–500 BCE.

== Recreation ==
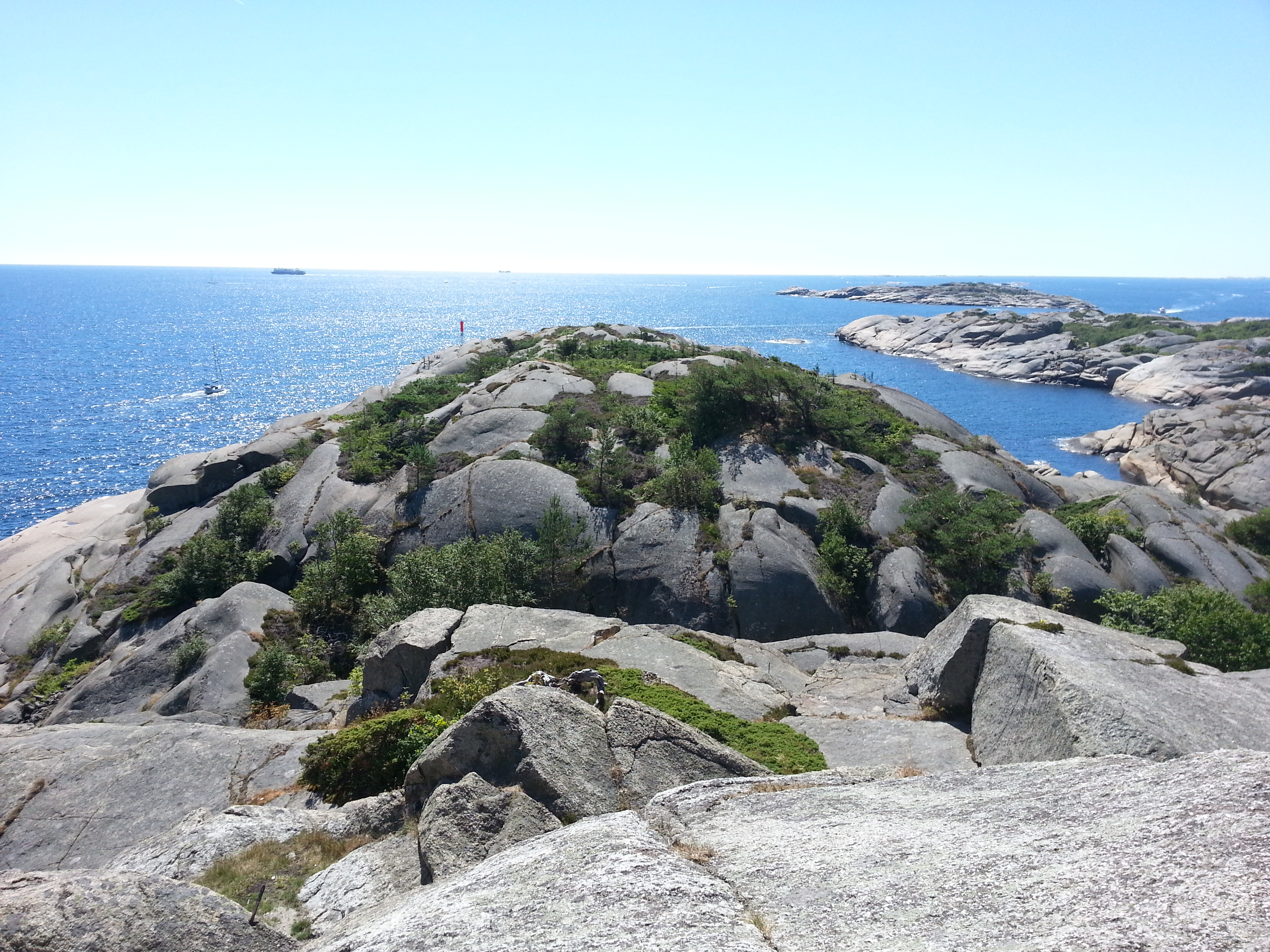
View from Tønsberg Barrel, a seamark known since the days of King Sverre.

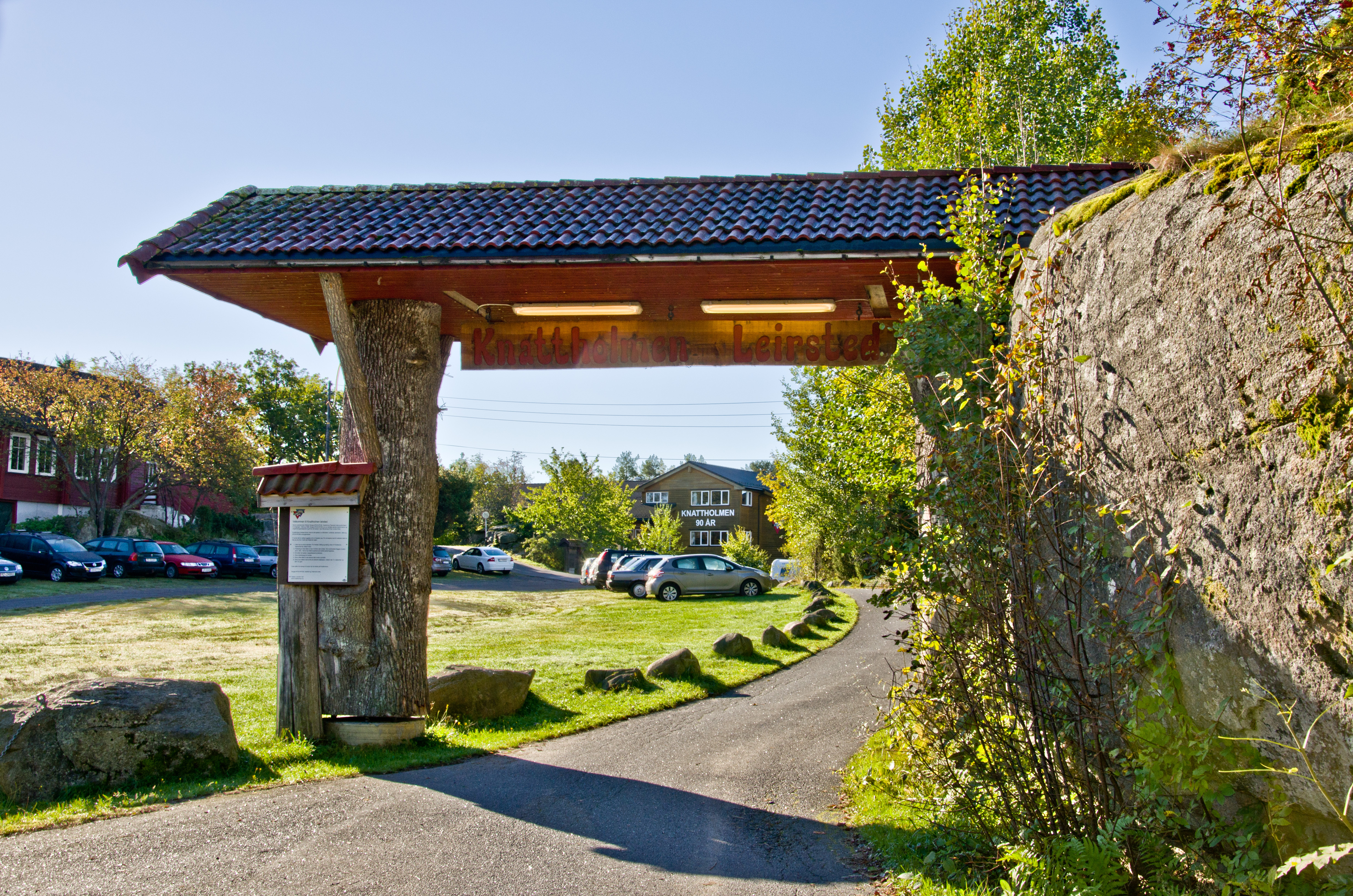
Entry to Knattholmen Campground on Natholmen Island.

Sandefjord has some of Eastern Norway's largest preserved coastal recreation areas. This includes Yxnøy, which is one of the largest preserved nature areas along Vestfold's coast. There are 20 kilometres (12 mi) of coastal hiking trails on Østerøya peninsula, including to its southern tip where Tønsberg Barrel is located. Tønsberg Barrel is an old beacon mentioned in Sverris saga. The 20-kilometre (12 mi) coastal path at Østerøya (East Island) is an extension of the 25-kilometre (16 mi) coastal path on Vesterøya. These 45 kilometres (28 mi) of hiking trails are part of the international North Sea Trail. Additional hiking trails are found at Preståsen, Hjertnes Forest, Fjellvikåsen, Mokollen, Midtås, as well as the Culture Walk. There are also 100 kilometres (62 mi) of hiking trails that are attached to trailheads by Heisetra in the rural area that used to be Andebu Municipality. Sandefjord is home to ten cross-country skiing trails (loipes).

Goksjø is a 3.47-square-kilometre (1.34 sq mi) lake on the border between Sandefjord and Larvik municipalities. It is the third-largest lake in Vestfold county. Goksjø is popular for swimming, kayaking and fishing; some of the fish species found here are Northern pike, European perch, Ide, Common dace, European eel, Salmon and Brown trout. Freshwater fishing is also common by rivers such as Svartåa and the Hagenes River in Kodal. Numedalslågen, which is considered one of Norway's best salmon fishing rivers, is located in neighboring town of Larvik.

Sandefjord is home to numerous campgrounds, all which are located along the seaside. Campgrounds include Asnes, Langeby, Vøra, Sjøbakken, Strand Leirsted, Solløkka, and islands such as Granholmen and Natholmen. Langeby is considered Sandefjord's best beach by Frommer's and Fodor's Travel Guides, and is home to Langeby Camping which offers boat and kayak rentals. Tent camping is permitted on numerous nearby islands, including the 4.5-hectare (11-acre) Hellesøya and the 5-hectare (12-acre) Buerøya. Langeby lies adjacent to Vøra, a neighboring beach and campground. Vøra tends to get crowded during warm summer days due to tourism. It attracts summer vacationers from throughout Norway during warm summer months.

The archipelago of Stauper in the Tønsbergfjorden, between the island of Tjøme and the Østerøya peninsula, is particularly popular during summer months. These islands are popular for swimming, kayaking, boating, and camping. It consists of four larger islands, four small islands, and a number of islets.

Tent camping is permitted in forests, a minimum of 150 metres (490 ft) from the nearest settlement.

=== Beaches ===
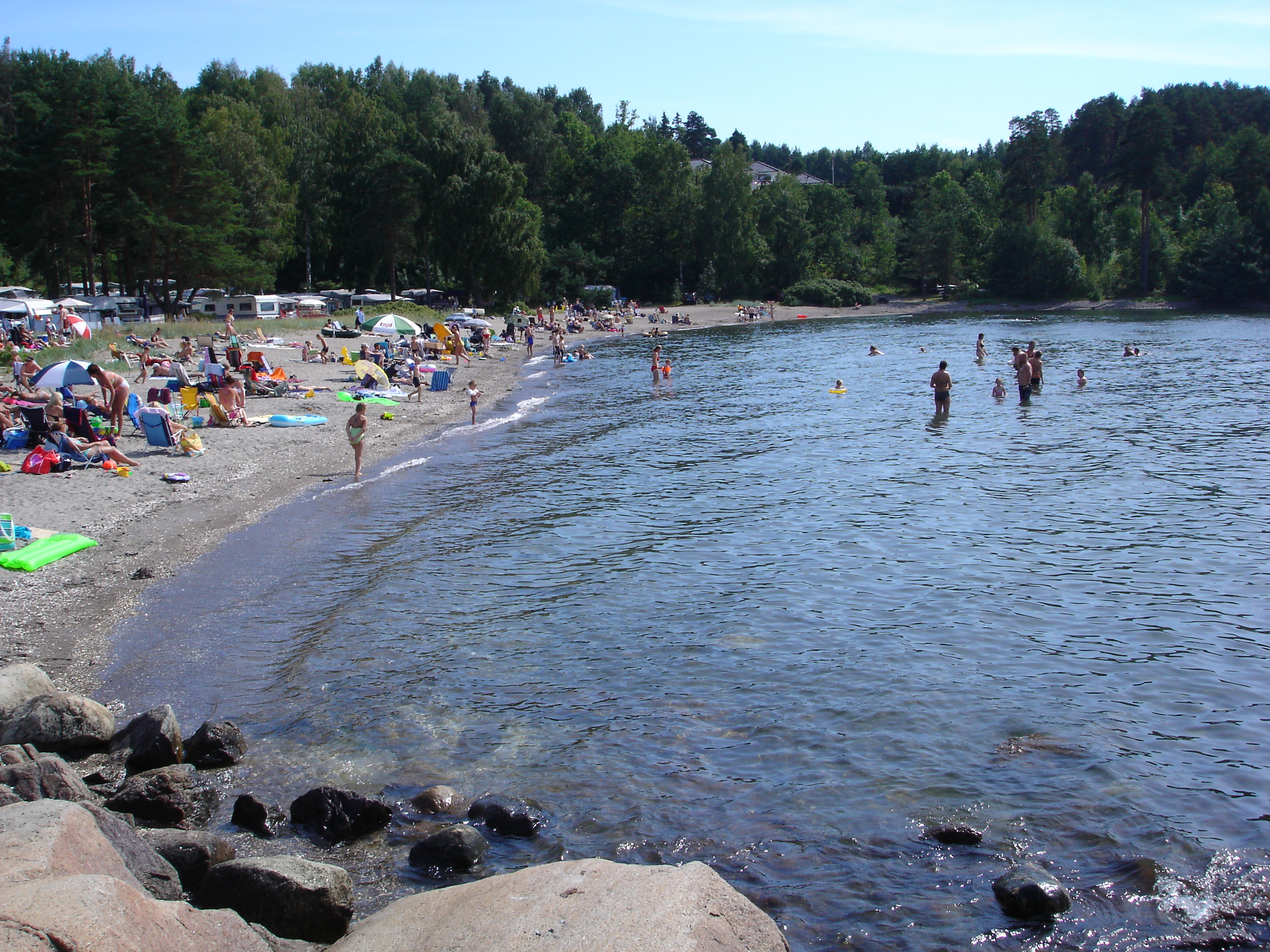
Langeby Beach attracts thousands of visitors every summer.

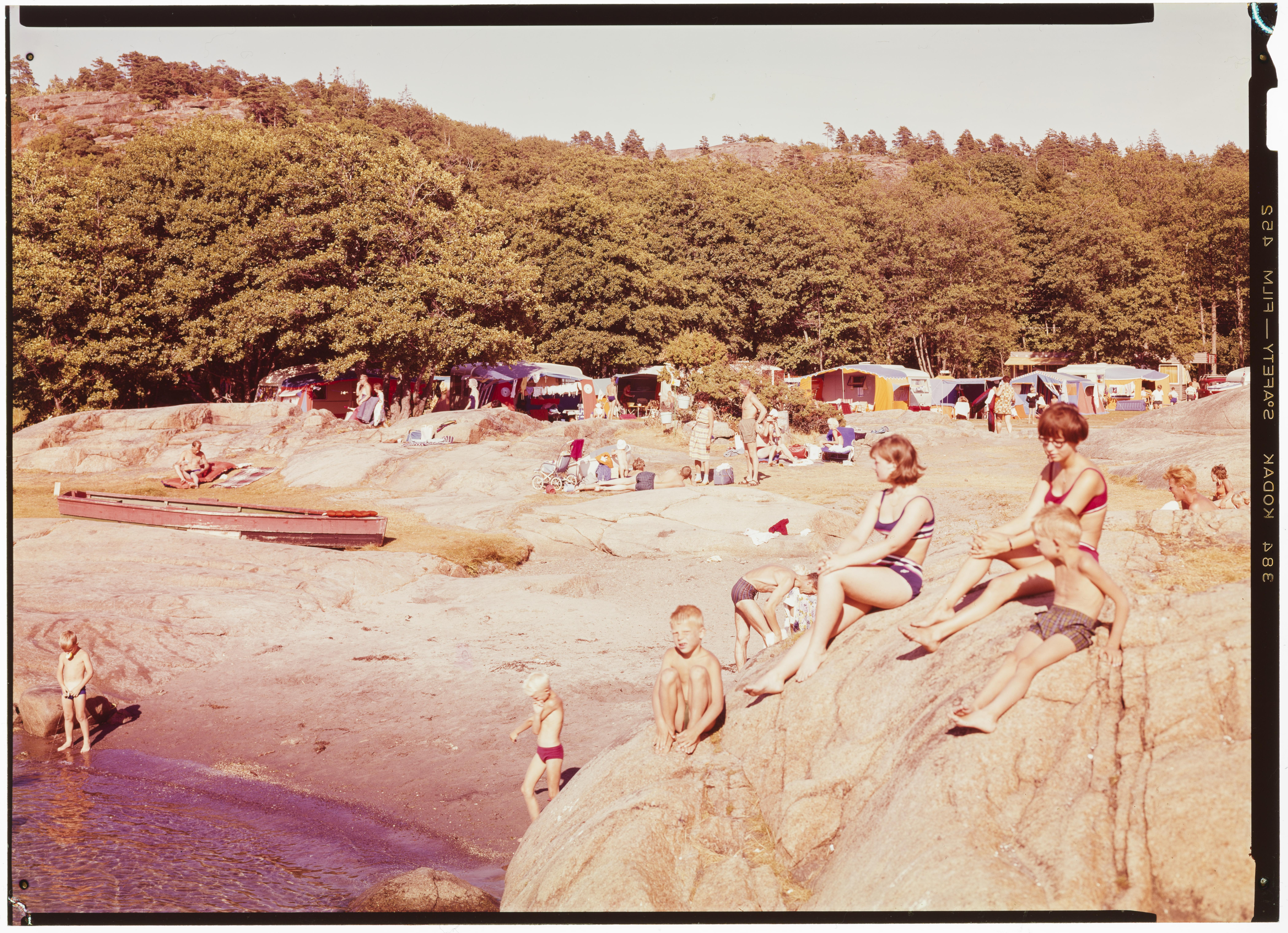
Camping at Langeby Beach, 1966

Sandefjord's 146 kilometres (91 mi) of coastline is home to various beaches:

- Asnes (West Island): Campground, convenience store, public restrooms, diving boards, sloping rocks.
- Flautangen (East Island): Firepits, fishing, public restrooms.
- Folehavna (West Island): Hiking trails, fishing, sloping rocks. Ruins from a German fortress built in 1941.
- Fruvika (West Island): Firepits, benches, public restrooms.
- Granholmen (islet): Campground, convenience store, public restrooms, pier, boat rentals, playground.
- Grubesand (West Island): 100-meter beach with hiking trails, firepits, sloping rocks, picnic tables, fishing, and public restrooms.
- Langeby (West Island): Campground, convenience store, fishing, boat pier, restrooms, sloping rocks, floating platform, diving boards, showers, volleyball court, soccer field, playground.
- Sandtangen (Goksjø Lake): Freshwater beach with pier and floating platform.
- Skjellvika (Østerøya): Oceanside pier, diving boards, hiking trails, floating platform, sloping rocks.
- Strømbadet (city center): floating jetty for swimming in the Sandefjord Harbor. Access from Hjertnesstranda.
- Tangen (Vesterøya): Diving boards, floating platform, soccer field, playground, volleyball court, benches, toilets.
- Truber and Yxnøy (East Island): Sloping rocks, public restrooms, hiking trails, picnic tables.
- Vøra (Vesterøya): Campground, convenience store, volleyball court, public restroom, playground, soccer field, floating platform.

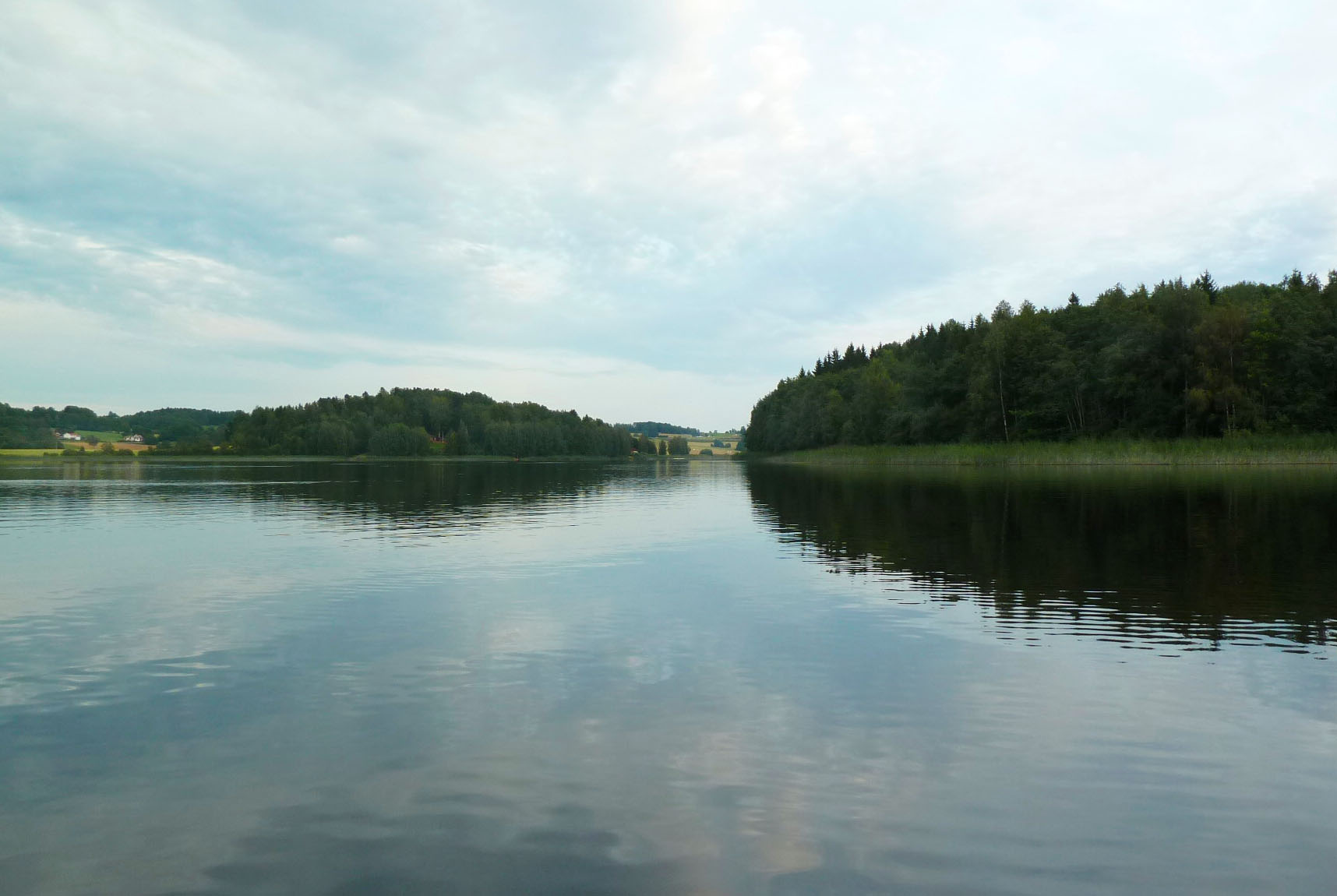
Goksjø Lake is used for ice-skating, swimming, kayaking, and fishing.

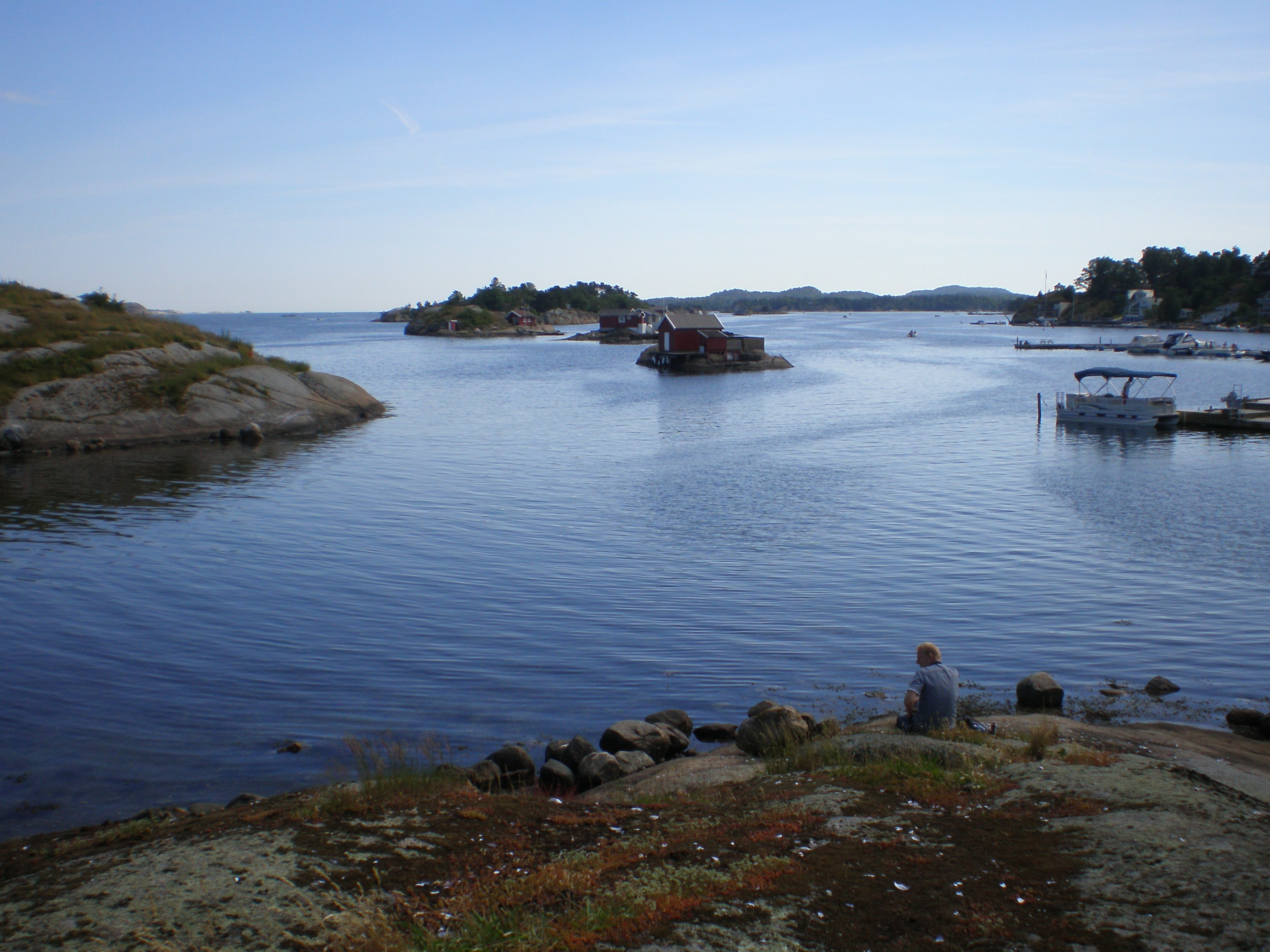
Between 116-124 islands and minor islets are within city limits.

Additional beaches include Bogen (Nallberg), Brunstad, Kleivern, Korsvik, Kulerødvannet, Sandbånn and Rossnesodden (Melsomvik), Storevar, Stålerødvannet, Ertsvika, Strandvika, Albertstranda, Ormestadvika, Trollsvann, and Vårnes.

Several islands with beaches are only accessible by boat, including Gokstadholmen, Lindholmen, Gåsø, Furuholmen, Gåsøkalven, Ravnø, Buerøya and Hellesøya.

The lake Goksjø is home to beaches such as Gubbetangen and Sandtangen.

In the early 1940s, Sandefjord's mayor Frithjof Holtedahl acquired the beaches of Asnes on Vesterøya and Skjellvika on Østerøya. Mayor Holtedahl was also instrumental in acquiring the beach Vøra in 1943.

=== Nature preserves ===
The early 1980s saw the establishment of several nature preserves in Sandefjord, including at Fokserød, Strandvika, Hemskilen, and Vøra.

Sandefjord is home to 16 nature preserves as of 2017:

- Dalaåsen (beech forest)
- Flisefyr-Hidalen (forest)
- Storås and Spirås (forest)
- Veggermyra og Nordre Skarsholttjønn (marsh)
- Langø and Bokemoa (protected landscape)
- Robergvannet (wetland)
- Melsom (plant- and wildlife preserve)
- Napperødtjern (riparian forest)
- Fokserød (beech forest)
- Holtan (plant preserve)
- Strandvika (riparian forest)
- Hemskilen (wetland)
- Vøra (geological area)
- Akersvannet (marsh)

=== Public parks ===
Public parks in Sandefjord include:

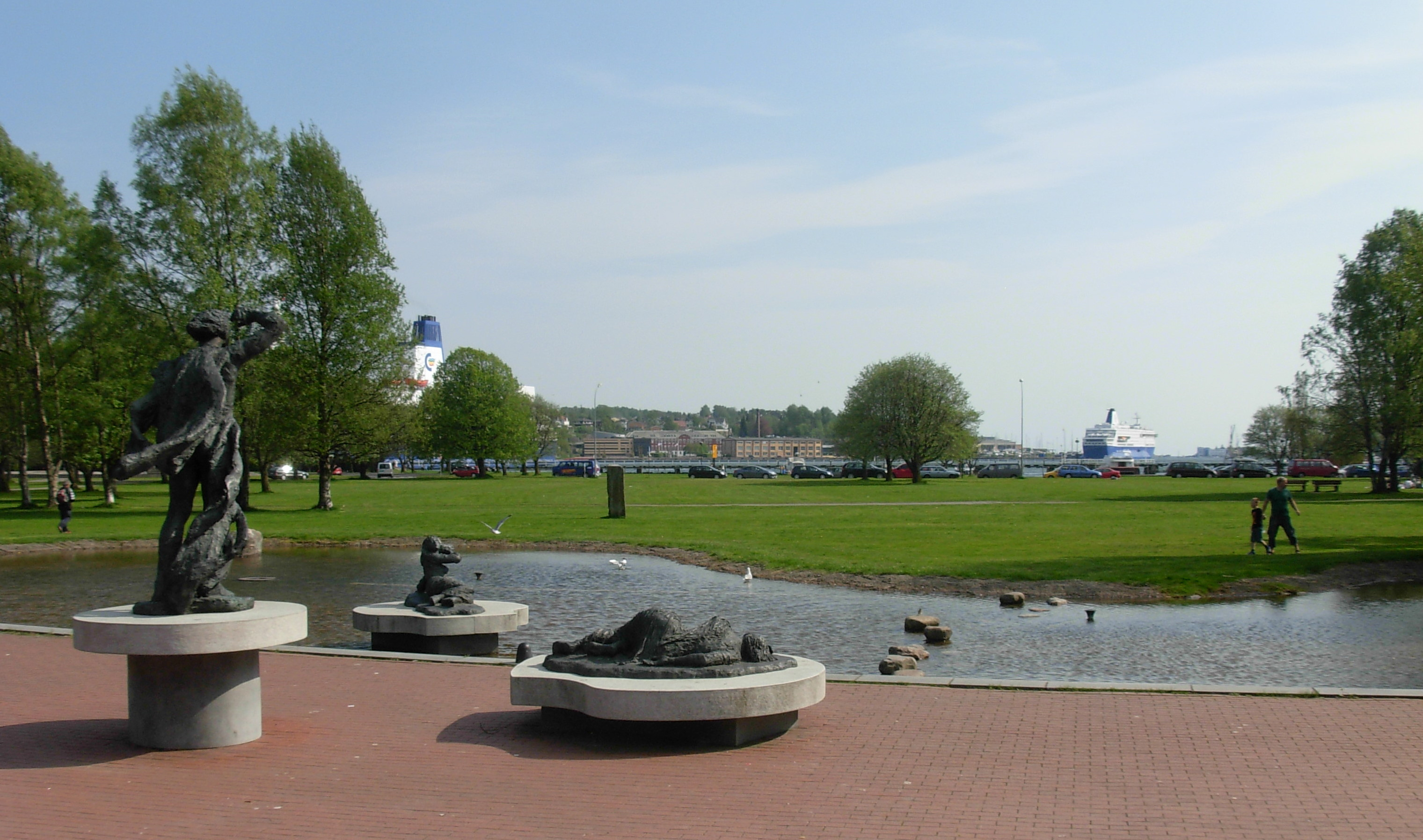
Poseidon Sculpture Park

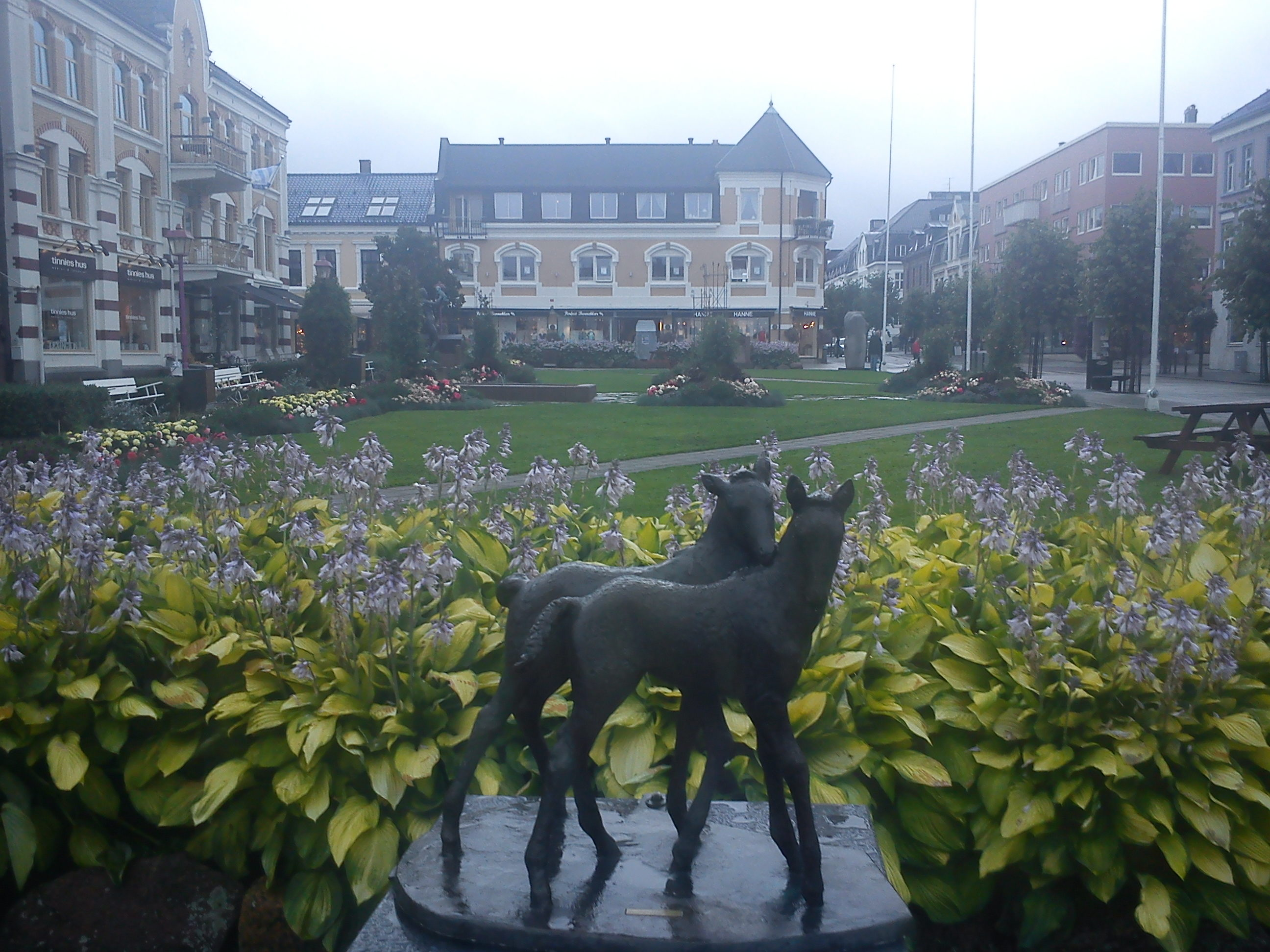
Byparken

- Bugårdsparken ("the Bugårds Park"), 60-acre park that is home to Storstadion, a 20-acre duck pond, public pools, ice-skating rink, and a sports facilities.
- Byparken ("the Town Park"), built after the town fire of 1900. Home of the statue Mother and Child by Arne Durban. The decision to establish a city park was made by the city council on 28 June 1901. In 1906, enough funds had been received to secure the land. The park has a cubic stone pedestal gifted to the city in May 1995 from Sandefjord Rotary. On this pedestal is where the "sculpture of the month" has been placed every month since 1995.
- Badeparken ("the bathing park"), 15-acre city park with fitness trail, an amphitheater, and playground, adjacent to Scandic Park Hotel and Hjertnes Civic and Theater Center
  - Poseidon Sculpture Park, sculpture park by Nina Sundbye established in 1995
- Andebuparken, park in the center of Andebu
- Sandefjord Hundepark (Sandefjord Dog Park), dog park near Sandefjord Upper Secondary School managed by Sandefjord hundeklubb
- Midtåsen Sculpture Park, 15-acre park at Anders Jahre's former villa, sculptures and views of the Sandefjordsfjord. The park was dedicated to artist Knut Steen.
- Hjertnesstranda ("the Hjertnes Beach"), park at the harbor-front with barbecue grills, sand volleyball fields, benches, public toilets.
  - Sandefjord Skatepark
- Kirkeparken ("the church park"), park immediately west of Sandefjord Church.
- Preståsen, park and recreation area situated on a 44-metre (144 ft) high hill overlooking the city. Preståsen has various hiking trails, benches, a playground, barbecue sites, a water fountain, and Brydedammen, which is a large pond. It has two access points from Bjerggata in the city center.

=== Fauna ===
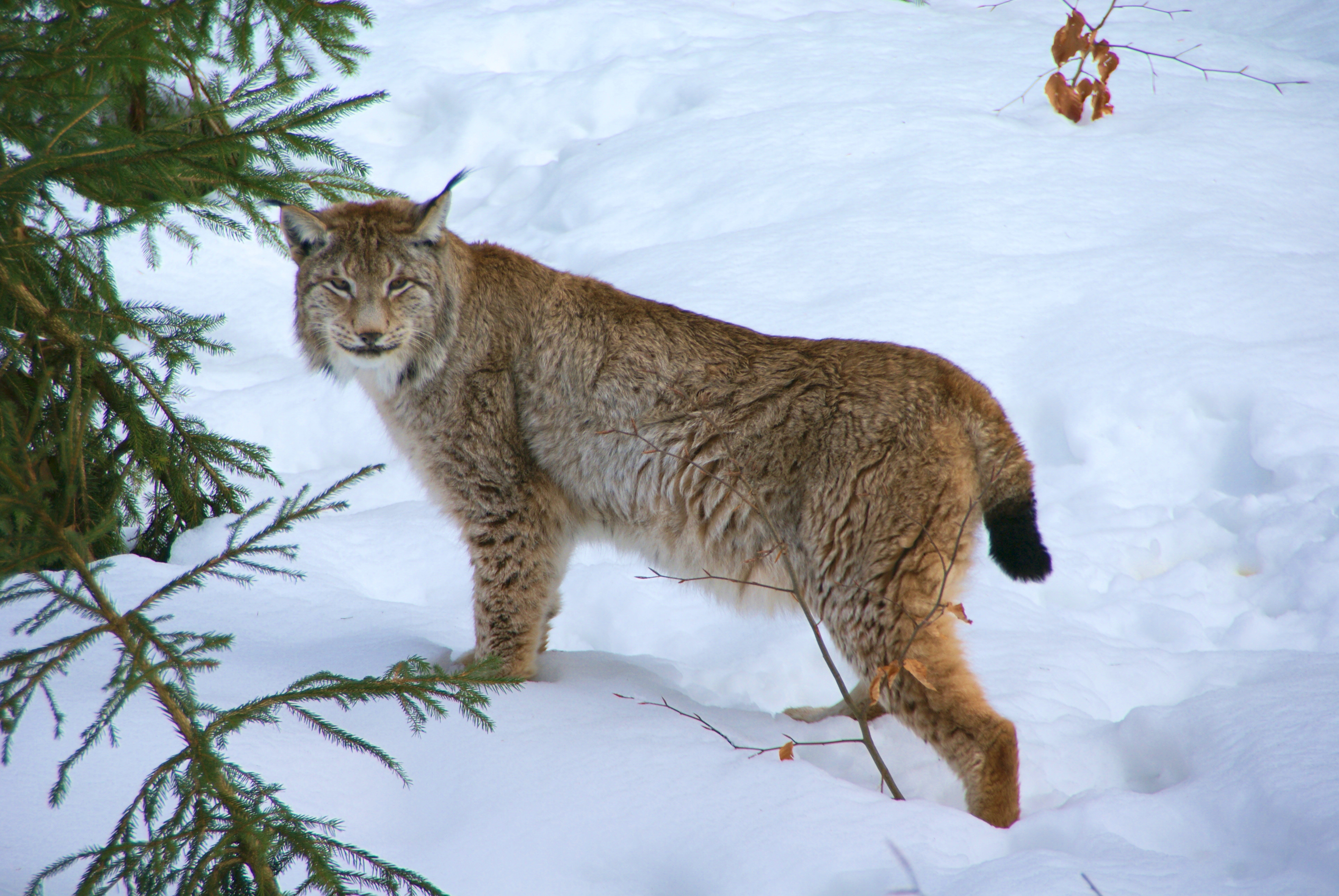
Eurasian lynx is rare but occasionally observed in Sandefjord.

Wildlife includes the Mountain hare, European badger, European beaver, Roe deer, Red deer, Moose, Red fox, European hedgehog, European pine marten, and Norway lemming. More rare but occasionally encountered are the Gray wolf, Eurasian lynx, Wolverine and Brown bear.

Wolves are extremely rare in Sandefjord, although they have been observed on numerous occasions. A wolf shot in neighboring Lardal in 2013 was the first wolf killed in Vestfold County in over 100 years.

Common European Viper is the only venomous snake found in Norway. There are an additional two non-venomous snake species found in Vestfold County: European grass snake and European smooth snake. The Slowworm is considered a lizard.

== Notable residents ==
=== Business & Public Service ===
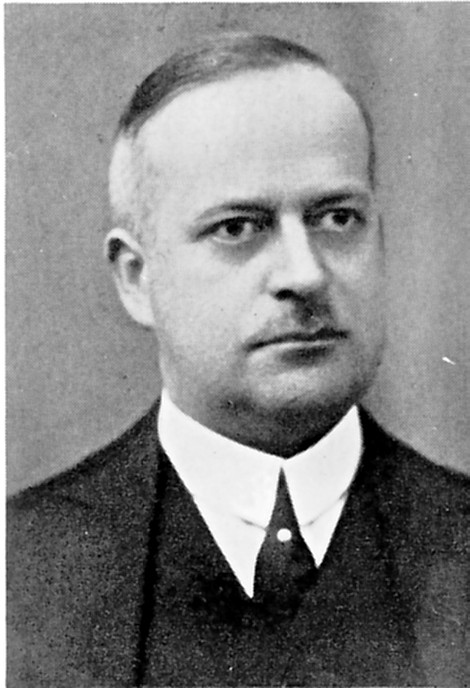
Lars Christensen, 1934

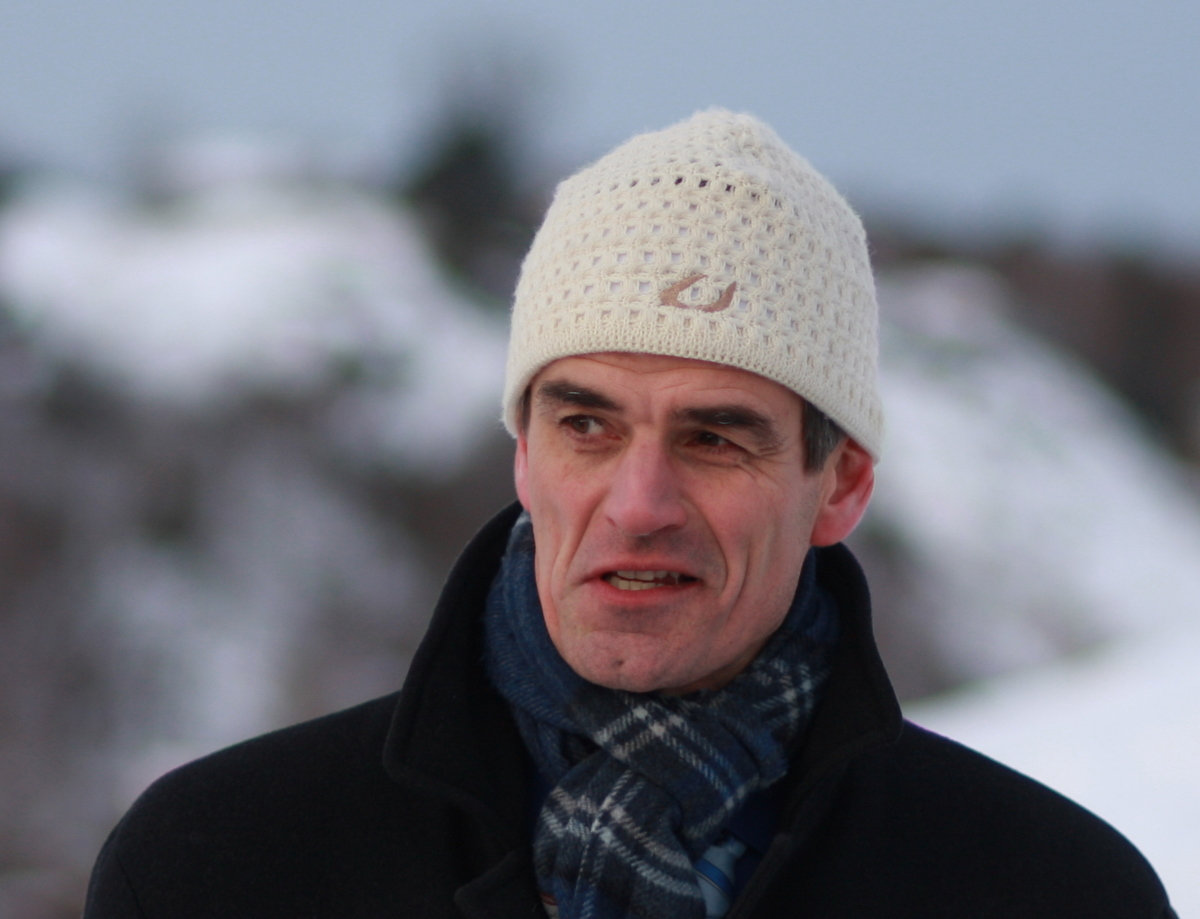
Bjørn Ole Gleditsch, 2010

- Christen Christensen (1845–1923), a Norwegian shipyard and ship-owner
- Johan Bryde (1858–1925), a ship owner and whaler, set up a whaling station in South Africa
- Carl Anton Larsen (1860–1924), an Antarctic explorer, set up the Antarctic whaling industry and the settlement at Grytviken on South Georgia
- Olaf Alfred Hoffstad (1865–1943), a botanist, school principal and Mayor of Sandefjord, 1911/1934
- Christian Theodore Pedersen (1876–1969), a Norwegian American seaman, whaling captain, and fur trader in Alaska, Canada, and the northern Pacific
- Lars Christensen (1884–1965), a Norwegian shipowner and whaling magnate
- Ole Aanderud Larsen (1884–1964), a ship designer and co-founder of the paint company Jotun
- Ingrid Christensen (1891–1976), a polar explorer who was the first woman to set foot on Antarctica
- Anders Jahre (1891–1982), a shipping magnate
- Odd Gleditsch, Sr. (1895–1990), a business entrepreneur and co-founder of the paint company Jotun
- Theodore Theodorsen (1897–1978), a Norwegian American theoretical aerodynamicist
- Anton Fredrik Klaveness (1903–1981), a Norwegian equestrian and ship-owner
- Karenanne Gussgard (born 1940), a retired justice of the Supreme Court of Norway 1990/2010
- Bjørn Ole Gleditsch (born 1963), an heir to paint company Jotun; Mayor of Sandefjord since 2003
- Marie Benedicte Bjørnland (born 1965), the head of the Norwegian Police Security Service from 2012 to 2019
- Frederic Hauge (born 1965), an environmental activist who founded and runs Bellona Foundation

=== The Arts ===
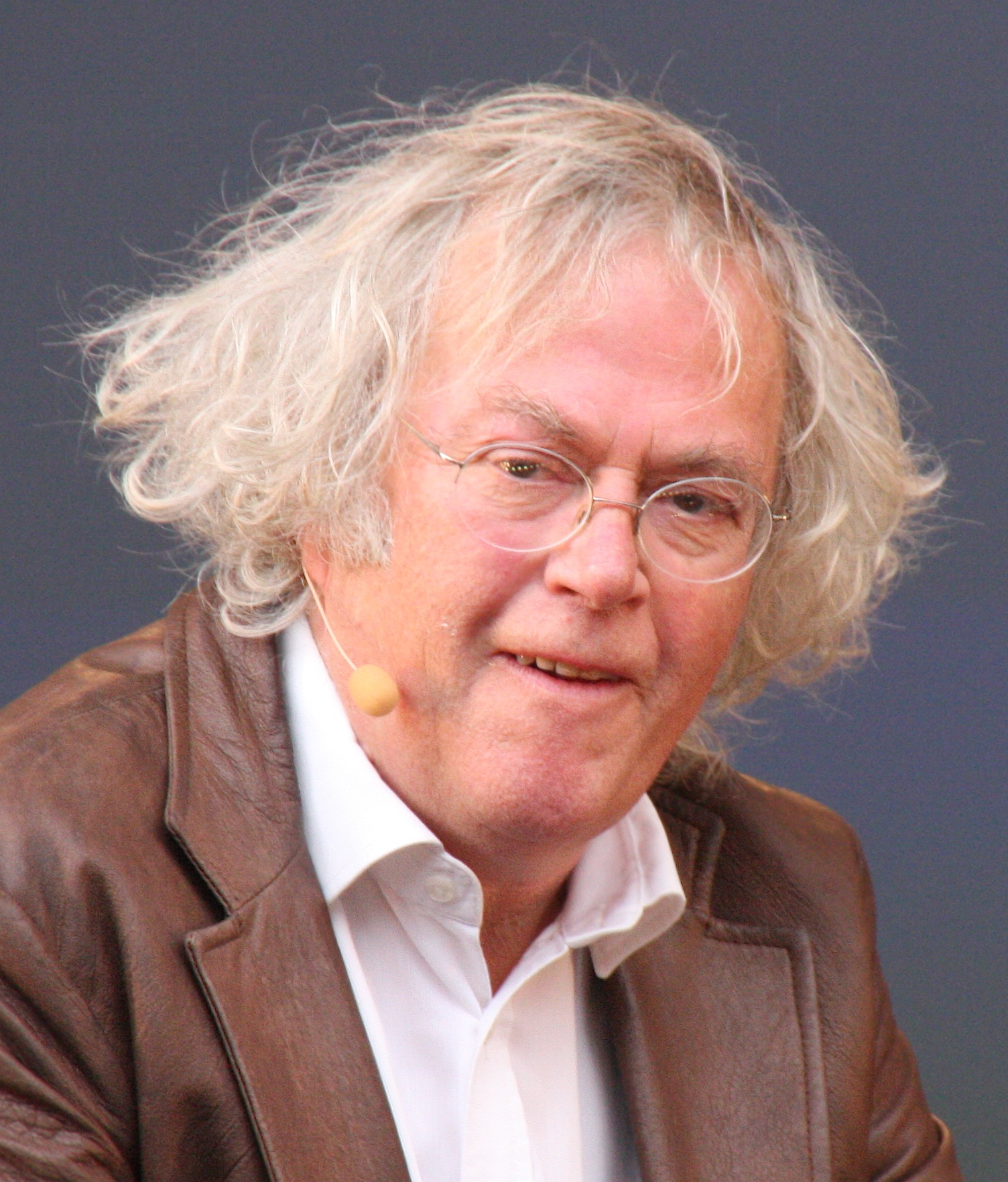
Dag Solstad, 2010

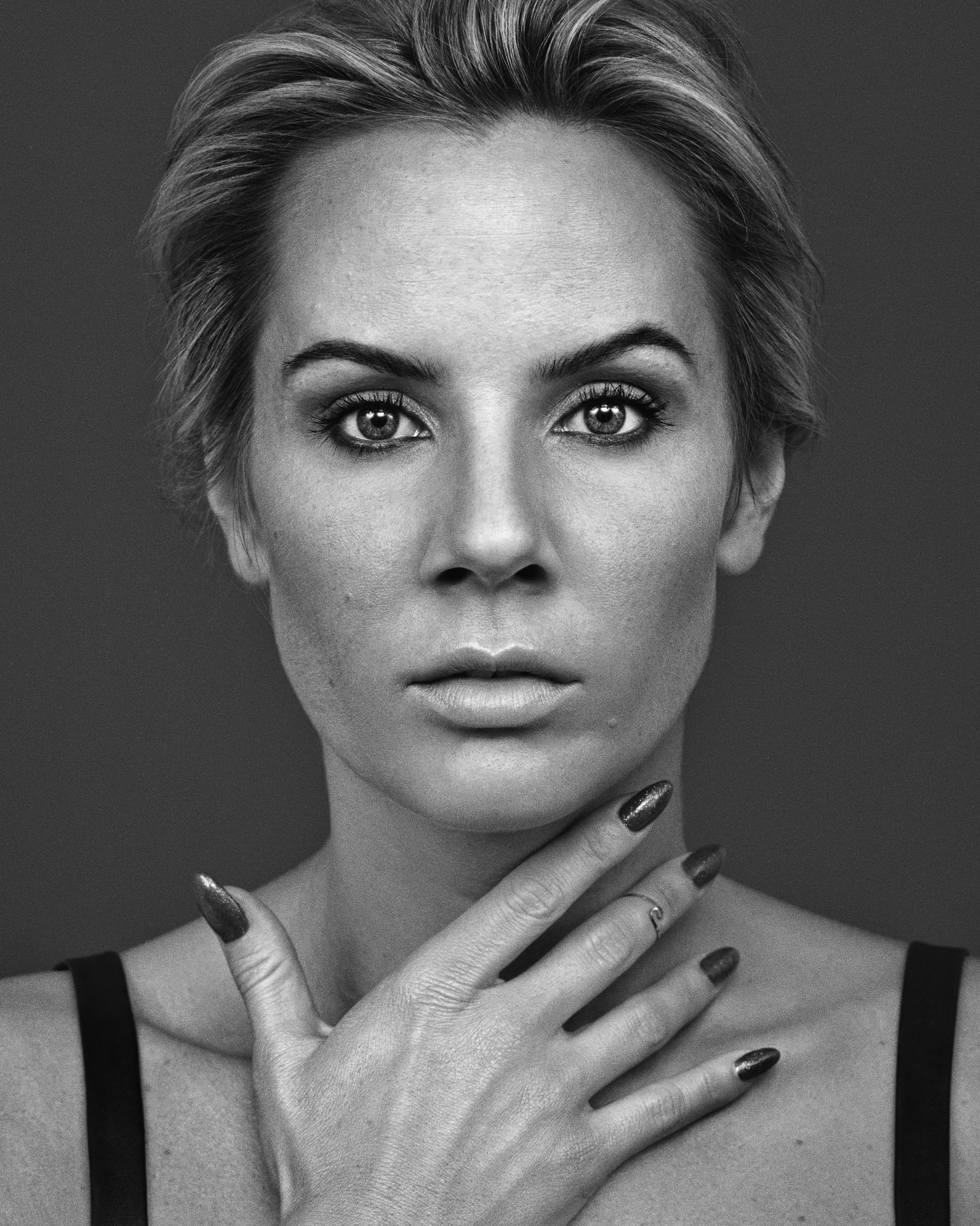
Ina Wroldsen, 2016

- Ole Windingstad (1886–1959), a Norwegian conductor, pianist and composer
- Eline Nygaard Riisnæs (1913–2011), a pianist and musicologist at UiO
- Teddy Nelson (1939–1992), a country music singer, sang with Skeeter Davis
- Dag Solstad (1941-2025), a Norwegian novelist, short-story writer and dramatist
- Lorene Yarnell (1944–2010), a dancer and actress, one of an American mime duo
- Karin Fossum (born 1954), a Norwegian author of crime fiction; the "Norwegian queen of crime"
- Bent Hamer (born 1956, a film director, writer and producer
- Nils Mathisen (born 1959), a musician and composer who plays keyboards, violin, guitar and bass
- Anita Hegerland (born 1961), a singer
- Finn Gjerdrum (born 1961), a Norwegian film producer
- Ole Mathisen (born 1965), a saxophone and clarinet musician and composer
- Hans Mathisen (born 1967), a guitarist
- Petter Wettre (born 1967), a jazz musician (Saxophone) and composer
- Per Mathisen (born 1969), a bassist and composer
- Thomas Numme (born 1970), a television host
- Henrik Hagtvedt (born 1971), a scholar, artist, and author
- Espen Sandberg (born 1971), a Norwegian film director and advertising producer
- Joachim Rønning (born 1972), a film director
- Ina Wroldsen (born 1984), a Norwegian singer and songwriter
- Per Fredrik Åsly (born 1986) known as PelleK, an actor, composer, singer, and YouTuber
- Tor Eckhoff (1964–2021), a YouTuber
- Lukas Zabulionis (born 1992), a saxophonist and composer who lives in Sandefjord

=== Sport ===
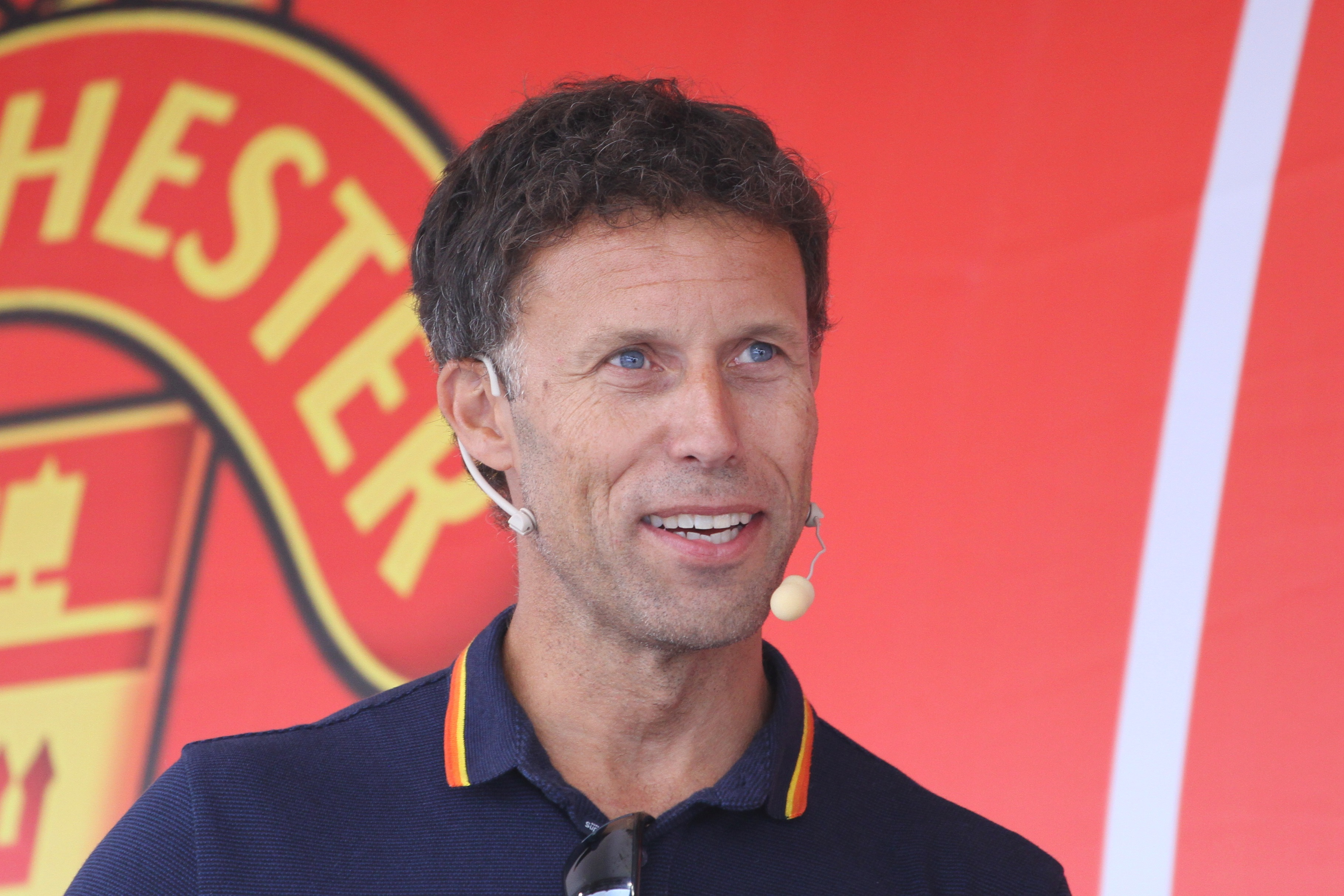
Ronny Johnsen, 2017

- Thorbjørn Svenssen (1924–2011), a footballer with a then record of 104 caps for Norway
- Solfrid Johansen (born 1956), a sport rower, came 4th & 5th at 1976 & 1984 Summer Olympics
- Erik Bjørkum (born 1965), a sailor and team silver medallist at the 1988 Summer Olympics
- Ronny Johnsen (born 1969), a footballer with 384 club caps and 62 for Norway
- Morten Fevang (born 1975), a football midfielder with 400 club caps
- Geir Ludvig Fevang (born 1980), a retired football midfielder with 390 club caps

== In popular culture ==
- Hodet over vannet (1993) was filmed at Yxney on Østerøya in Sandefjord. The 1996-remake is starring Cameron Diaz.
- Deadline Torp (2005), Norwegian film based on the 1994 Torp hostage crisis. It was directed by Nils Gaup and written by Jo Nesbø.
- An episode, "Power Junkies" (season 1), of Outrageous Acts of Science (2012) was partly shot in Sandefjord.
- Episode #5.26 of the British TV series Coach Trip (2010) was shot in Sandefjord.
- Den starkaste (1929), Swedish silent film partly shot in Sandefjord.
- Valfångare (1939), Swedish movie filmed in Sandefjord. It was directed by Anders Henrikson and Tancred Ibsen.
- Music video for "Belinda" (2021) by Marcus & Martinus was shot at Sandefjord Airport
- "Sang til Sandefjord", song played daily by Sandefjord Church
- Music video for "The Cabin" (2013) by Ylvis was shot in Andebu Municipality, now part of Sandefjord.
- Music video for "Hvalfangsmuseet" (2011) by Bare Egil Band was shot in Sandefjord.
- The Machinery (2020–), Viaplay TV show featuring Kristoffer Joner. It is based in and filmed in Sandefjord. Filming began in Sandefjord in 2019.

== Gallery ==
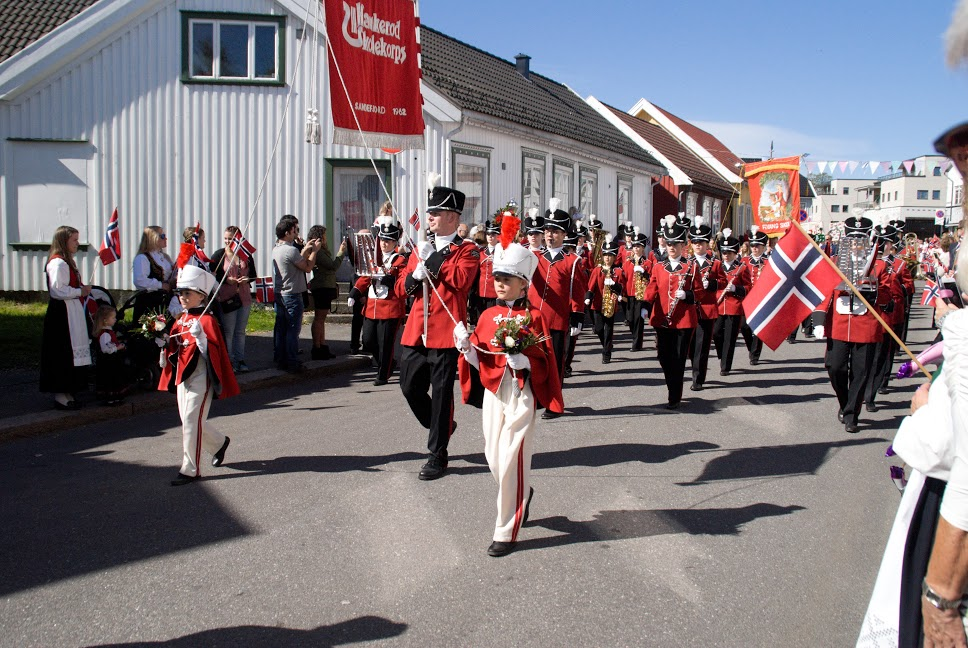
17 May parade, 2016

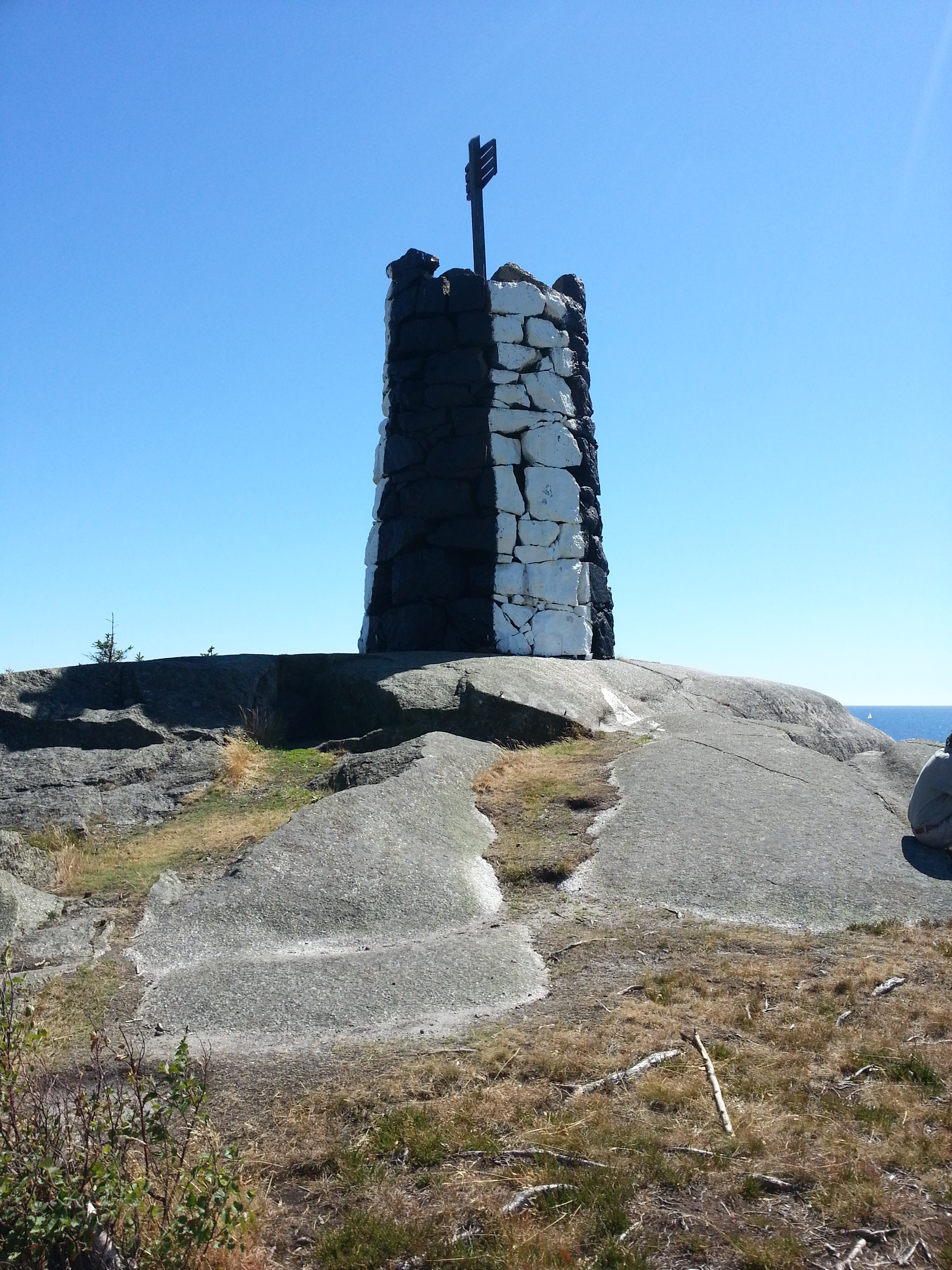
Tønsberg Barrel at the southern tip of Østerøya

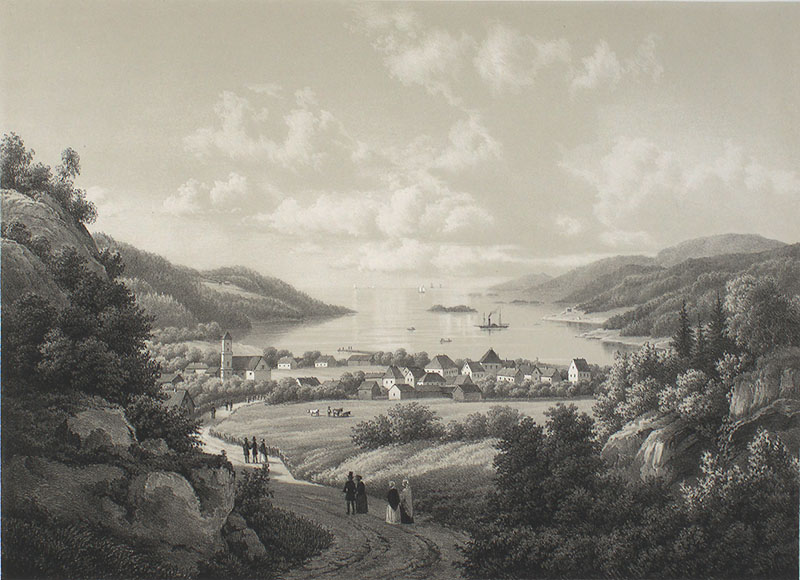
Sandefjord in 1848, painting

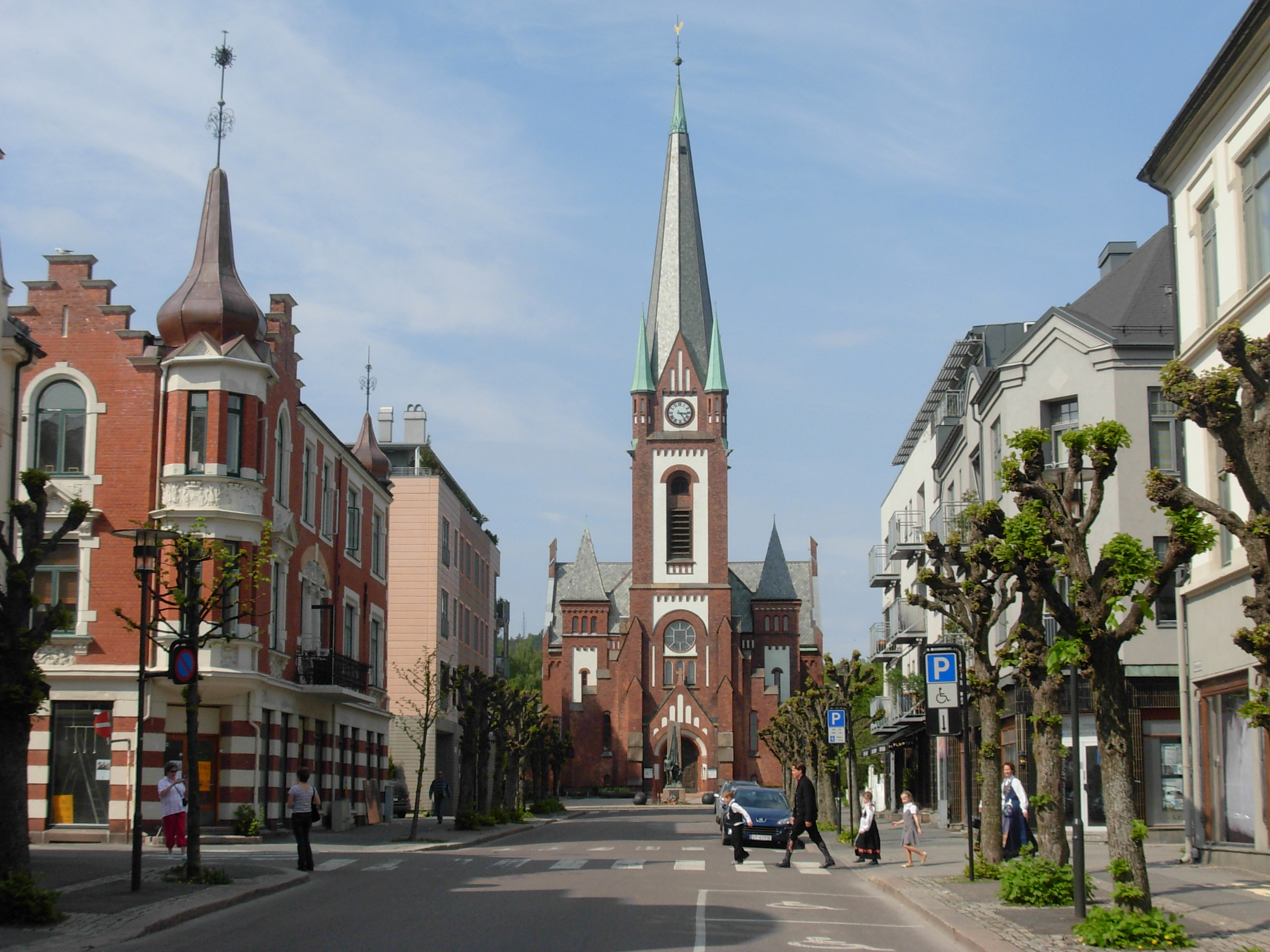
Sandefjord Church

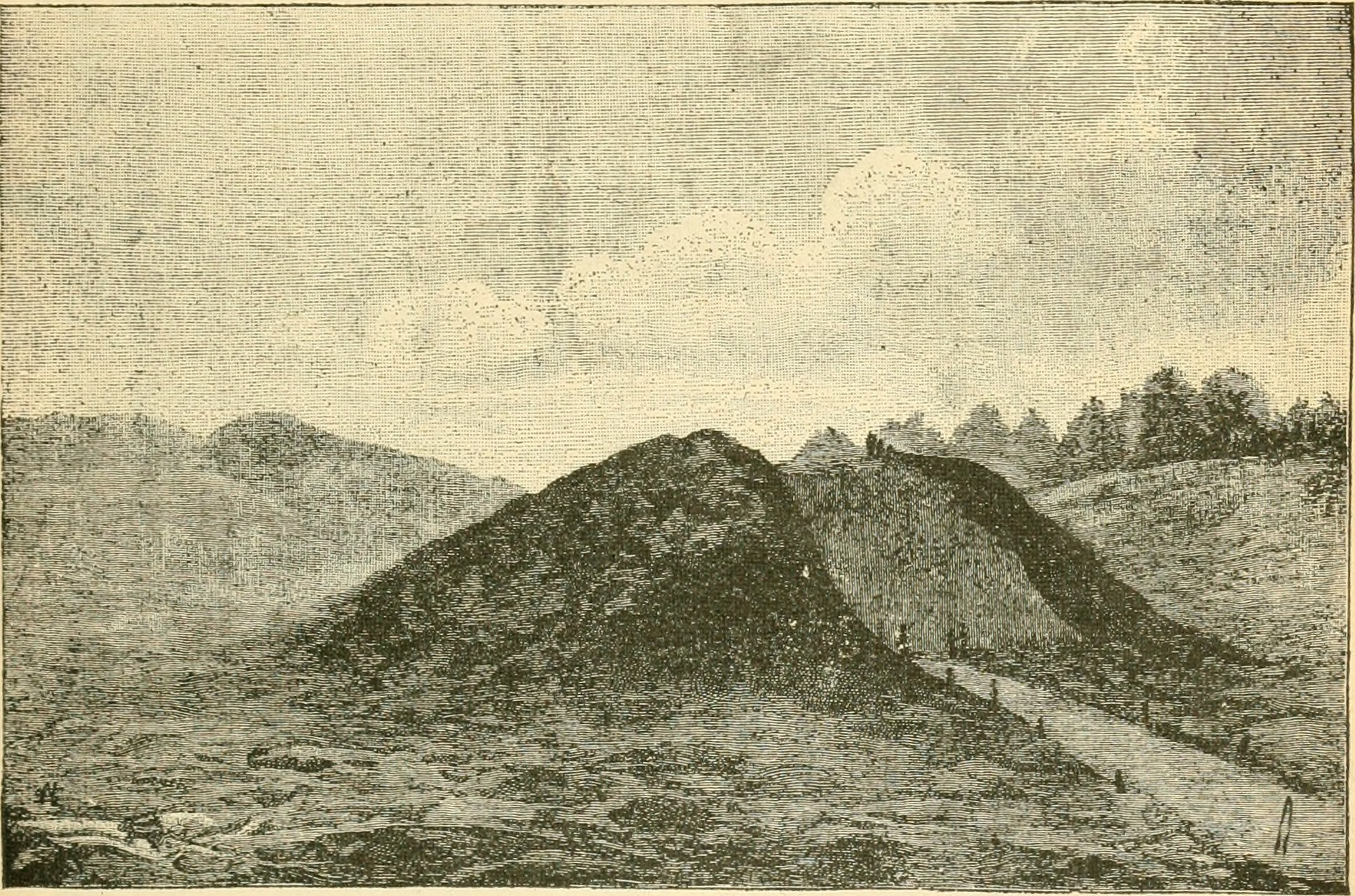
Gokstad Mound

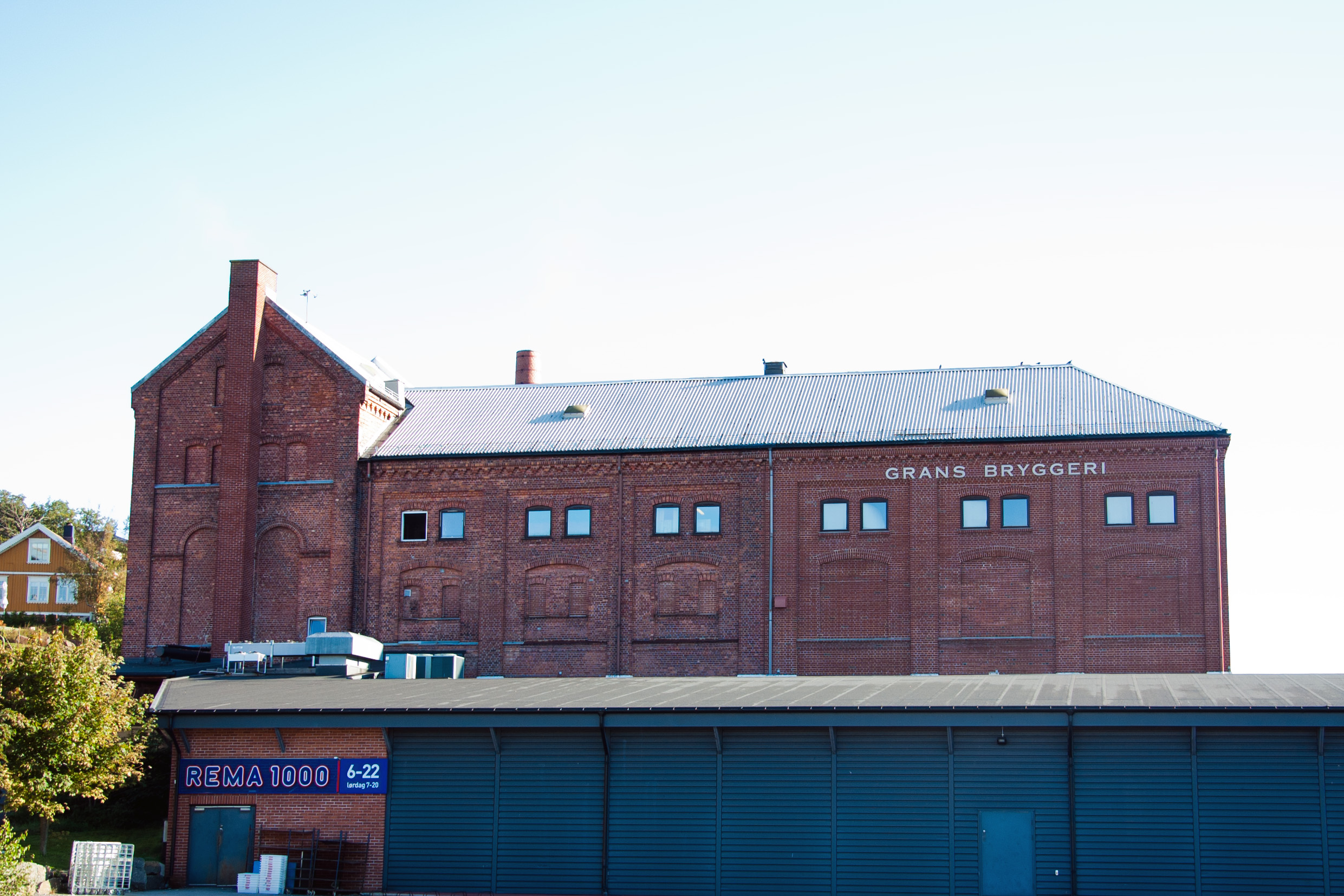
Grans Brewery

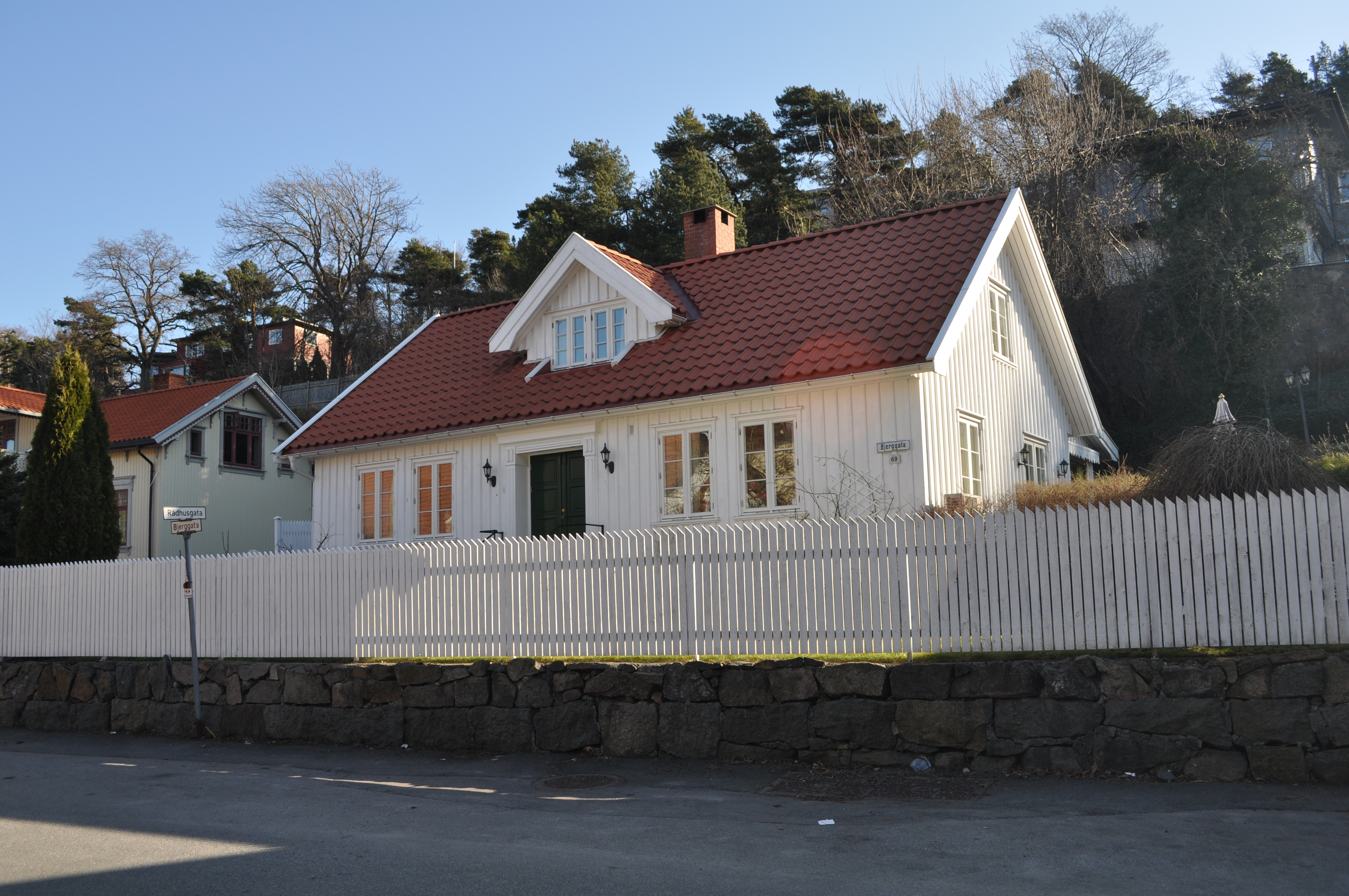
Typical house in Bjerggata

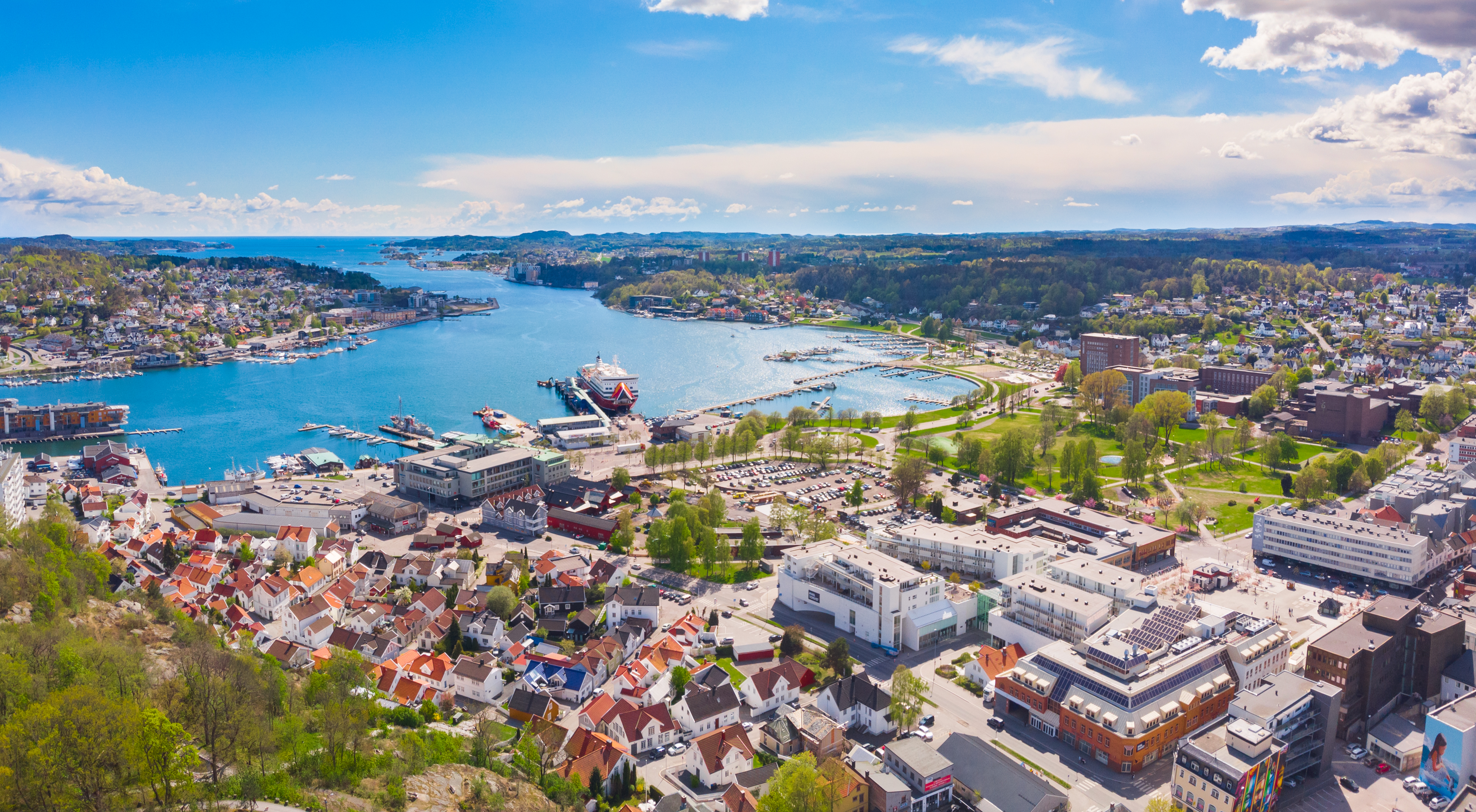
Sandefjord, spring 2019

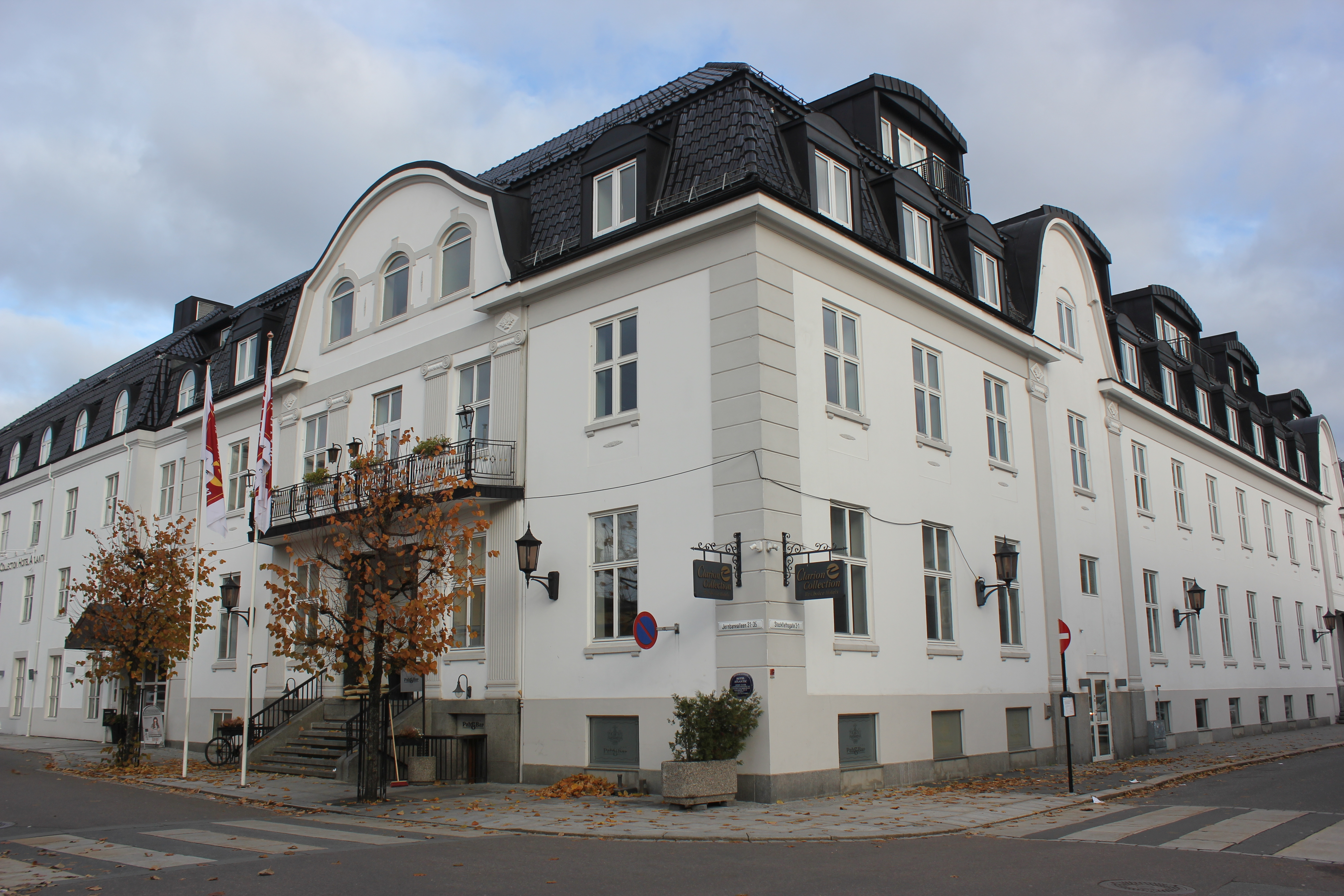
Clarion Collection Hotel Atlantic

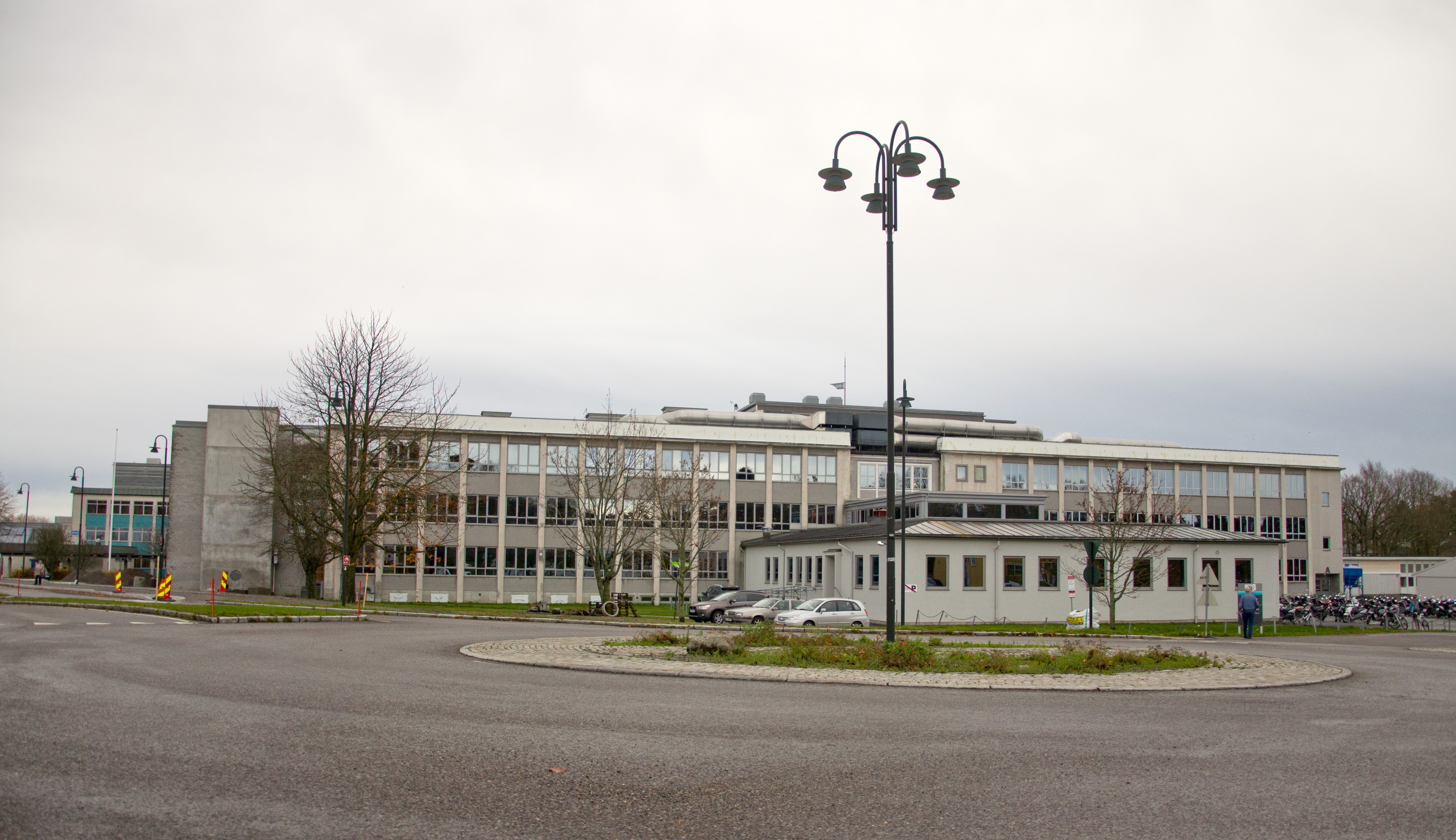
Sandefjord High School is Norway's largest.

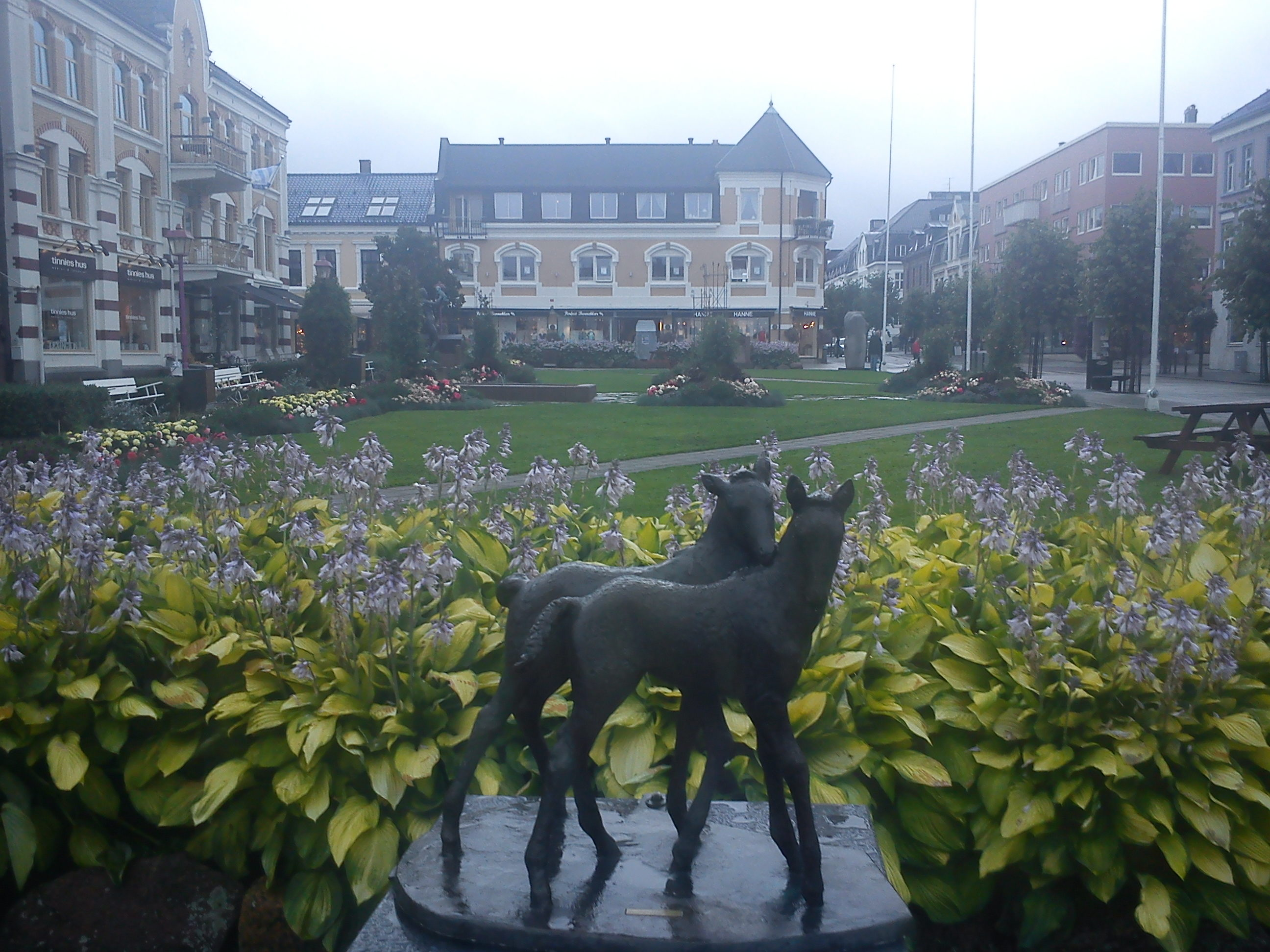
City Park (Byparken)

== See also ==
- List of schools in Sandefjord
- Sandefjords Blad (local newspaper)
- Larvik and Sandefjord metropolitan region
- Sang til Sandefjord
