= Stokke Municipality =

Former municipality in Vestfold, Norway

Stokke Municipality Stokke kommune
- Former municipality
- Stokke herred (historic name)
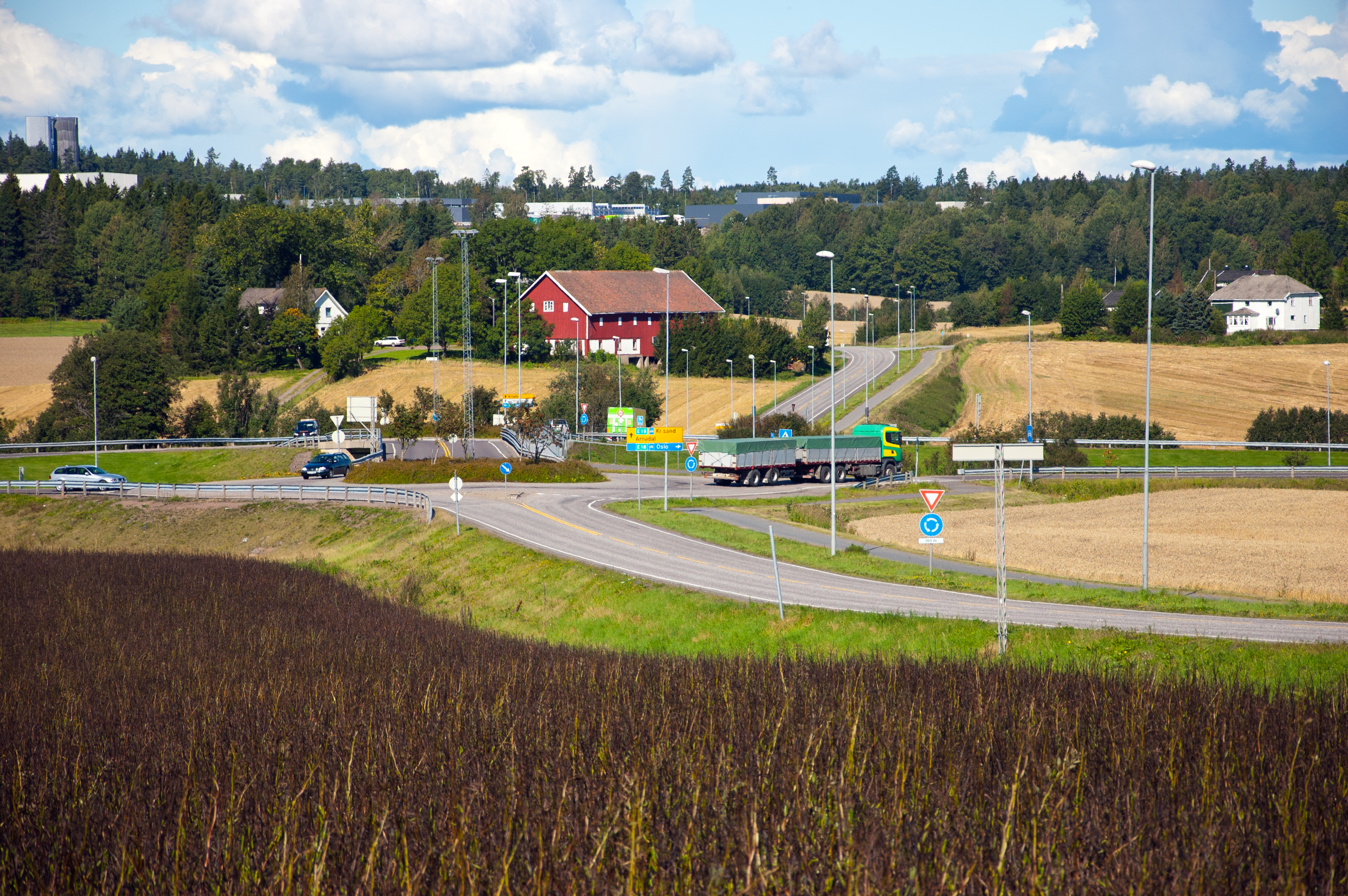

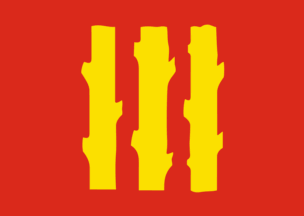
- Flag Coat of arms

- Vestfold within Norway

- Stokke within Vestfold
- Coordinates: 59°14′24″N 10°16′15″E
- Country: Norway
- County: Vestfold
- District: Vestfold
- Established: 1 Jan 1838
  - Created as: Formannskapsdistrikt
- Disestablished: 1 Jan 2017
  - Succeeded by: Sandefjord Municipality
- Administrative centre: Stokke

Government
  - Mayor (2011–2016): Erlend Larsen (H)

Area (upon dissolution)
  - Total: 118.36 km^{2} (45.70 sq mi)
  - Land: 115.59 km^{2} (44.63 sq mi)
  - Water: 2.77 km^{2} (1.07 sq mi) 2.3%
  - Rank: #372 in Norway
- Highest elevation (Høgståsen): 175.6 m (576 ft)

Population (2016)
  - Total: 11,657
  - Rank: #99 in Norway
  - Density: 100.8/km^{2} (261/sq mi)
  - Change (10 years): ▲ +15.1%
- Demonym: Stokkesokning

Official language
  - Norwegian form: Bokmål
- Time zone: UTC+01:00 (CET)
  - Summer (DST): UTC+02:00 (CEST)
- ISO 3166 code: NO-0720

Stokke (Norwegian pronunciation: [stɔkːə]; locally [stɔ̂kːæ]) is a former municipality in Vestfold county, Norway. The 118.36-square-kilometre (45.70 sq mi) municipality existed from 1838 until its dissolution in 2017. The area is now part of Sandefjord Municipality. The administrative centre was the village of Stokke. Other villages in Stokke included Vear, Melsomvik, Storevar, and Valberg.

Prior to its dissolution in 2017, the 118.36-square-kilometre (45.70 sq mi) municipality was the 372nd largest by area out of the 428 municipalities in Norway. Stokke Municipality was the 99th most populous municipality in Norway with a population of about 11,657. The municipality's population density was 100.8 inhabitants per square kilometre (261/sq mi) and its population had increased by 15.1% over the previous 10-year period.

== General information ==
=== Administrative history ===
The formannskapsdistrikt law of 1837 created a system of local government in Norway by establishing each town (ladested or kjøpstad) and each Church of Norway prestegjeld as a civil municipality. On 1 January 1838, Stokke prestegjeld was established as Stokke Municipality. On 1 January 1901, the island of Håøya (population: 70) was transferred from Stokke Municipality to the neighboring Nøtterøy Municipality.

During the 1960s, there were many municipal mergers across Norway due to the work of the Schei Committee. On 1 January 1964, the island of Veierland (population: 165) was transferred from Stokke Municipality to the neighboring Nøtterøy Municipality. Then on 1 January 1967, there was a very small boundary adjustment between Sem Municipality and Stokke Municipality: a small area of Sem Municipality (population: 2) and a small area of Stokke Municipality (population: 5) were swapped.

In 2017 to 2020, there were many municipal and county mergers across Norway due to the work of the Solberg cabinet. During the September 2015 elections, 77.8 percent of Stokke residents voted to merge with Sandefjord Municipality. On 1 January 2017, the village of Vear was transferred from the Stokke Municipality to the neighboring Tønsberg Municipality. Also on 1 January 2017, Stokke Municipality was dissolved and the following areas were merged to form an enlarged Sandefjord Municipality:

- all of Stokke Municipality (population: 11,657)
- all of Andebu Municipality (population: 5,937)
- all of Sandefjord Municipality (population: 45,820)

=== Name ===
The municipality is named after the old Stokke prestegjeld. The prestegjeld was named after the old Stokke farm (Old Norse: Stokkar) since the first Stokke Church was built there. The name is the plural form of stokkr which means "log" or "stick". This is probably referring to some hills/ridges near the local church site.

=== Coat of arms ===
The coat of arms was granted on 13 January 1984. The official blazon is "Gules, three ragged staffs Or" (Norwegian: I rødt tre opprette kvistede gull trestammer). This means the arms have a red field (background) and the charge is a set of three ragged staffs. The charge has a tincture of Or which means it is commonly colored yellow, but if it is made out of metal, then gold is used. The arms are canting since stokk means "sticks" or "logs". The arms show three to represent the three main parishes in the municipality: Stokke, Skjee and Arnadal. The arms were designed by Truls Nygaard, who based it off an original proposal by Hallvard Trætteberg which was further developed by Hans Gerhard Sørensen. The municipal flag had the same design as the coat of arms.

=== Churches ===
The Church of Norway had three parishes (sokn) within Stokke Municipality. It is part of the Sandefjord prosti (deanery) in the Diocese of Tunsberg.

Churches in Stokke Municipality
Parish (sokn)	Church name	Location of the church	Year built	Photo
Arnadal	Arnadal Church	Fossnes	1882	
Skjee	Skjee Church	Skjee	c. 1100	
Stokke	Stokke Church	Stokke	1886	

== History ==
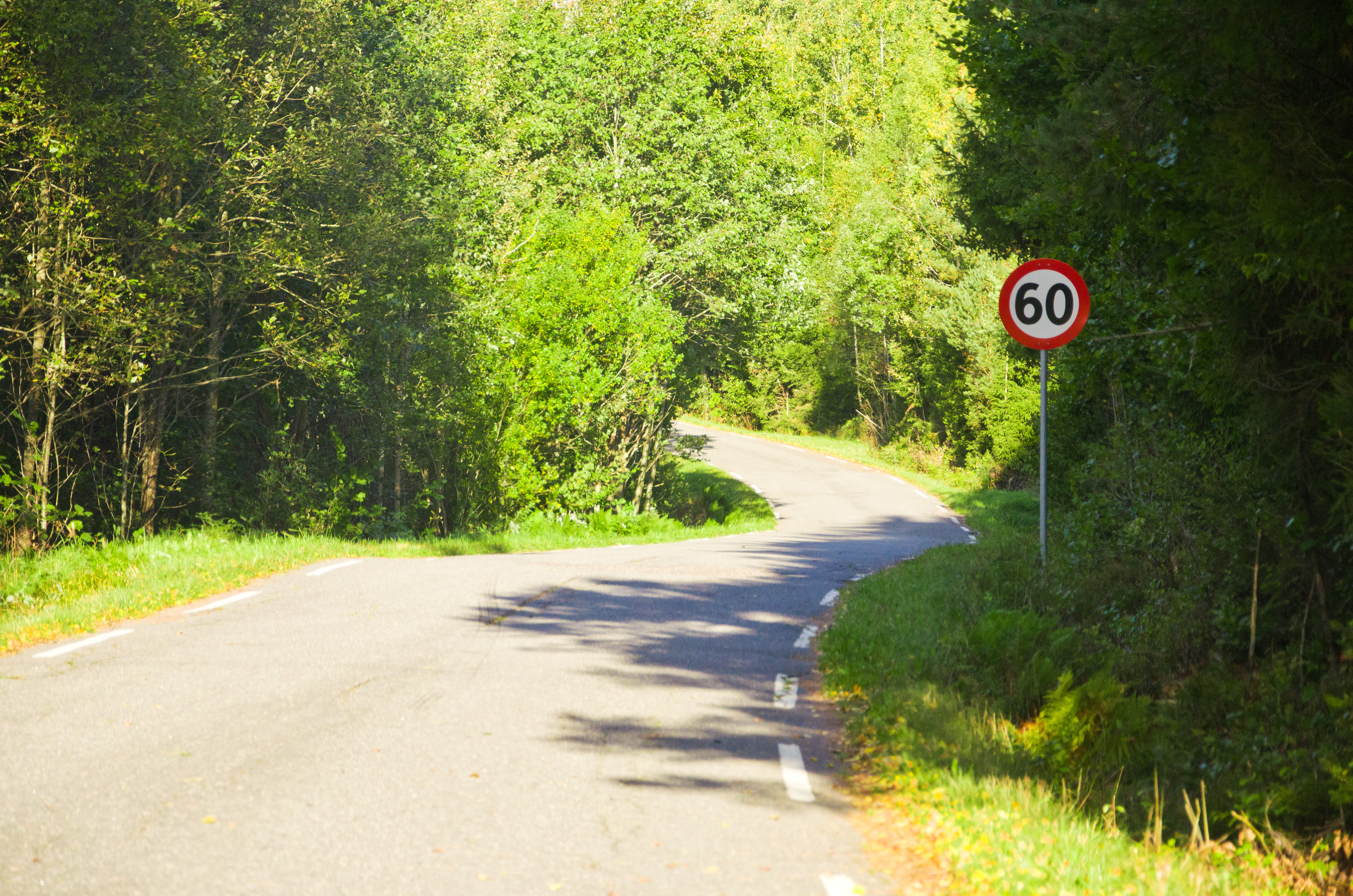

About 16,000 historic artifacts have been found at Brunstad in Stokke, mostly tools made out of flint but also roughly sixty hearths. The first recorded grave from Mesolithic times is also found here and dated to 5900 BCE.

Leading up to 2017, Stokke residents were deciding whether or not to remain as an independent municipality or if they should merge with a neighboring municipality. Relatively few Stokke residents read Sandefjords Blad, the main newspaper of Sandefjord Municipality, and few residents reside or work in the city of Sandefjord. The wealthiness of Sandefjord, however, was often used as an argument for the merger with Sandefjord. Its international airport Sandefjord Airport, Torp was also seen as a deciding factor for Stokke's decision to merge into Sandefjord. For the village of Vear, on the other hand, a majority of residents preferred a merge into neighboring Tønsberg Municipality. Consequentially, that village was transferred into Tønsberg Municipality on 1 January 2017, the same day Stokke Municipality joined Sandefjord Municipality. Vear is home to 2,500 residents as of 2016, which made up 22 percent of Stokke Municipality's total population prior to the merge.

=== Sundås Fort ===
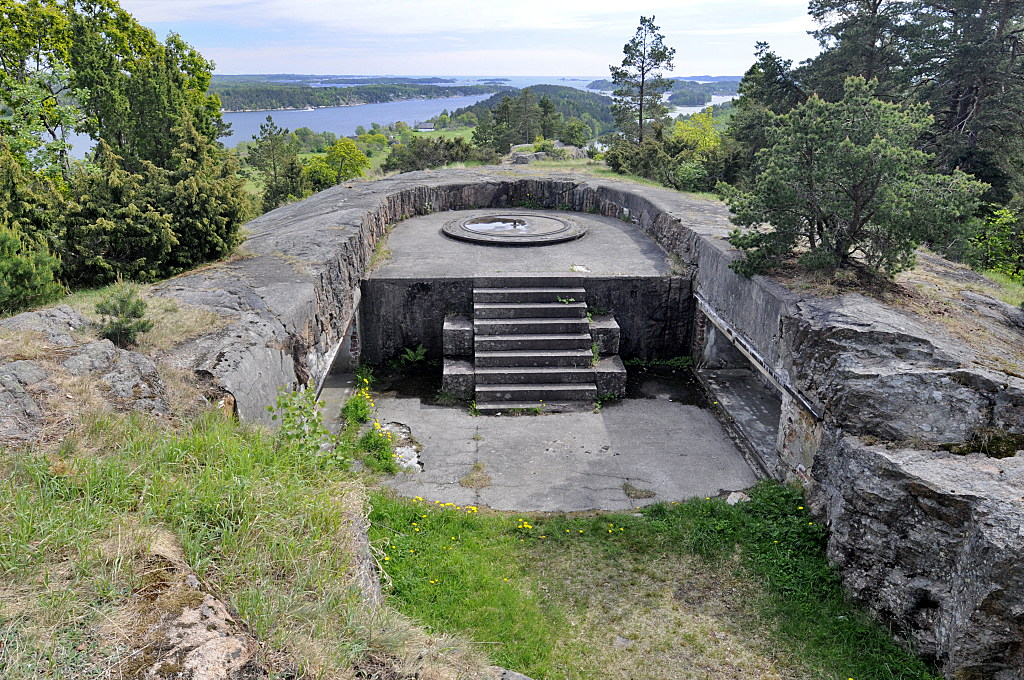
Gun pit at Sundåsbatteriet.

Remains of a fort, the Sundås battery, can be found across the Tønsbergfjorden from Håøya Island. The fortifications were constructed in the late 19th century during turbulent times with Sweden during the Union between Sweden and Norway. It was part of the newly established Norwegian Coastal Artillery (Norwegian: Kystartilleriet). The fort was erected to keep potential enemies from entering Tønsberg by sea, and was also meant to protect the Marine harbor in the village of Melsomvik. Work on the fort began in 1897, and the forts at both Håøya Island and Sundåsen were completed in 1899. Trenches, commando posts, fencing, concrete gun pits, and other remains from the fort can still be seen at Sundås. The fort lies by the Tønsbergfjord with surrounding views of Færder Lighthouse and islands such as Håøya, Tjøme, Veierland, and Nøtterøy. The cannons were demolished by German forces in 1942 during the German occupation of Norway. The Norwegian Armed Forces remained in control of the fort from 1945 until 1962, when it became public property.

== Government ==
While it existed, Stokke Municipality was responsible for primary education (through 10th grade), outpatient health services, senior citizen services, welfare and other social services, zoning, economic development, and municipal roads and utilities. The municipality was governed by a municipal council of directly elected representatives. The mayor was indirectly elected by a vote of the municipal council. The municipality was under the jurisdiction of the Tønsberg District Court and the Agder Court of Appeal.

=== Municipal council ===
The municipal council (Kommunestyre) of Stokke Municipality was made up of 29 representatives that were elected to four year terms. The tables below show the historical composition of the council by political party.

Stokke kommunestyre 2015–2016
Party name (in Norwegian)	Number of representatives
Labour Party (Arbeiderpartiet)	8
Progress Party (Fremskrittspartiet)	2
Green Party (Miljøpartiet De Grønne)	1
Conservative Party (Høyre)	9
Christian Democratic Party (Kristelig Folkeparti)	2
Centre Party (Senterpartiet)	1
Socialist Left Party (Sosialistisk Venstreparti)	1
Liberal Party (Venstre)	1
Residents' List Stokke (Innbyggerlista Stokke)	4
Total number of members:	29
Note: On 1 January 2017, Stokke Municipality became part of Sandefjord Municipality.

Stokke kommunestyre 2011–2015
Party name (in Norwegian)	Number of representatives
Labour Party (Arbeiderpartiet)	11
Progress Party (Fremskrittspartiet)	3
Conservative Party (Høyre)	10
Christian Democratic Party (Kristelig Folkeparti)	2
Centre Party (Senterpartiet)	1
Socialist Left Party (Sosialistisk Venstreparti)	1
Liberal Party (Venstre)	1
Total number of members:	29

Stokke kommunestyre 2007–2011
Party name (in Norwegian)	Number of representatives
Labour Party (Arbeiderpartiet)	10
Progress Party (Fremskrittspartiet)	6
Conservative Party (Høyre)	6
Christian Democratic Party (Kristelig Folkeparti)	3
Centre Party (Senterpartiet)	2
Socialist Left Party (Sosialistisk Venstreparti)	1
Liberal Party (Venstre)	1
Total number of members:	29

Stokke kommunestyre 2003–2007
Party name (in Norwegian)	Number of representatives
Labour Party (Arbeiderpartiet)	9
Progress Party (Fremskrittspartiet)	6
Conservative Party (Høyre)	6
Christian Democratic Party (Kristelig Folkeparti)	2
Centre Party (Senterpartiet)	2
Socialist Left Party (Sosialistisk Venstreparti)	3
Liberal Party (Venstre)	1
Total number of members:	29

Stokke kommunestyre 1999–2003
Party name (in Norwegian)	Number of representatives
Labour Party (Arbeiderpartiet)	7
Progress Party (Fremskrittspartiet)	3
Conservative Party (Høyre)	13
Christian Democratic Party (Kristelig Folkeparti)	4
Centre Party (Senterpartiet)	3
Liberal Party (Venstre)	1
Total number of members:	31

Stokke kommunestyre 1995–1999
Party name (in Norwegian)	Number of representatives
Labour Party (Arbeiderpartiet)	6
Progress Party (Fremskrittspartiet)	3
Conservative Party (Høyre)	11
Christian Democratic Party (Kristelig Folkeparti)	3
Centre Party (Senterpartiet)	5
Socialist Left Party (Sosialistisk Venstreparti)	2
Liberal Party (Venstre)	1
Total number of members:	31

Stokke kommunestyre 1991–1995
Party name (in Norwegian)	Number of representatives
Labour Party (Arbeiderpartiet)	6
Progress Party (Fremskrittspartiet)	2
Conservative Party (Høyre)	11
Christian Democratic Party (Kristelig Folkeparti)	3
Centre Party (Senterpartiet)	5
Socialist Left Party (Sosialistisk Venstreparti)	3
Liberal Party (Venstre)	1
Total number of members:	31

Stokke kommunestyre 1987–1991
Party name (in Norwegian)	Number of representatives
Labour Party (Arbeiderpartiet)	7
Progress Party (Fremskrittspartiet)	4
Conservative Party (Høyre)	11
Christian Democratic Party (Kristelig Folkeparti)	3
Centre Party (Senterpartiet)	3
Socialist Left Party (Sosialistisk Venstreparti)	2
Liberal Party (Venstre)	1
Total number of members:	31

Stokke kommunestyre 1983–1987
Party name (in Norwegian)	Number of representatives
Labour Party (Arbeiderpartiet)	9
Progress Party (Fremskrittspartiet)	2
Conservative Party (Høyre)	11
Christian Democratic Party (Kristelig Folkeparti)	4
Centre Party (Senterpartiet)	3
Socialist Left Party (Sosialistisk Venstreparti)	1
Liberal Party (Venstre)	1
Total number of members:	31

Stokke kommunestyre 1979–1983
Party name (in Norwegian)	Number of representatives
Labour Party (Arbeiderpartiet)	8
Progress Party (Fremskrittspartiet)	1
Conservative Party (Høyre)	12
Christian Democratic Party (Kristelig Folkeparti)	4
Centre Party (Senterpartiet)	3
Socialist Left Party (Sosialistisk Venstreparti)	1
Liberal Party (Venstre)	2
Total number of members:	31

Stokke kommunestyre 1975–1979
Party name (in Norwegian)	Number of representatives
Labour Party (Arbeiderpartiet)	8
Anders Lange's Party (Anders Langes parti)	2
Conservative Party (Høyre)	8
Christian Democratic Party (Kristelig Folkeparti)	4
Centre Party (Senterpartiet)	6
Socialist Left Party (Sosialistisk Venstreparti)	1
Liberal Party (Venstre)	2
Total number of members:	31

Stokke kommunestyre 1971–1975
Party name (in Norwegian)	Number of representatives
Labour Party (Arbeiderpartiet)	11
Conservative Party (Høyre)	7
Christian Democratic Party (Kristelig Folkeparti)	3
Centre Party (Senterpartiet)	8
Liberal Party (Venstre)	2
Total number of members:	31

Stokke kommunestyre 1967–1971
Party name (in Norwegian)	Number of representatives
Labour Party (Arbeiderpartiet)	9
Conservative Party (Høyre)	7
Christian Democratic Party (Kristelig Folkeparti)	1
Centre Party (Senterpartiet)	6
Liberal Party (Venstre)	2
Total number of members:	25

Stokke kommunestyre 1963–1967
Party name (in Norwegian)	Number of representatives
Labour Party (Arbeiderpartiet)	10
Conservative Party (Høyre)	6
Christian Democratic Party (Kristelig Folkeparti)	2
Centre Party (Senterpartiet)	5
Liberal Party (Venstre)	2
Total number of members:	25

Stokke herredsstyre 1959–1963
Party name (in Norwegian)	Number of representatives
Labour Party (Arbeiderpartiet)	9
Conservative Party (Høyre)	7
Christian Democratic Party (Kristelig Folkeparti)	2
Centre Party (Senterpartiet)	5
Liberal Party (Venstre)	2
Total number of members:	25

Stokke herredsstyre 1955–1959
Party name (in Norwegian)	Number of representatives
Labour Party (Arbeiderpartiet)	9
Conservative Party (Høyre)	6
Christian Democratic Party (Kristelig Folkeparti)	2
Farmers' Party (Bondepartiet)	5
Liberal Party (Venstre)	3
Total number of members:	25

Stokke herredsstyre 1951–1955
Party name (in Norwegian)	Number of representatives
Labour Party (Arbeiderpartiet)	8
Conservative Party (Høyre)	6
Christian Democratic Party (Kristelig Folkeparti)	2
Farmers' Party (Bondepartiet)	5
Liberal Party (Venstre)	3
Total number of members:	24

Stokke herredsstyre 1947–1951
Party name (in Norwegian)	Number of representatives
Labour Party (Arbeiderpartiet)	7
Christian Democratic Party (Kristelig Folkeparti)	1
Joint List(s) of Non-Socialist Parties (Borgerlige Felleslister)	16
Total number of members:	24

Stokke herredsstyre 1945–1947
Party name (in Norwegian)	Number of representatives
Labour Party (Arbeiderpartiet)	8
Conservative Party (Høyre)	5
Farmers' Party (Bondepartiet)	4
Joint list of the Liberal Party (Venstre) and the Radical People's Party (Radikale Folkepartiet)	4
Joint List(s) of Non-Socialist Parties (Borgerlige Felleslister)	3
Total number of members:	24

Stokke herredsstyre 1937–1941*
Party name (in Norwegian)	Number of representatives
Labour Party (Arbeiderpartiet)	4
Conservative Party (Høyre)	8
Farmers' Party (Bondepartiet)	4
Liberal Party (Venstre)	4
Joint List(s) of Non-Socialist Parties (Borgerlige Felleslister)	4
Total number of members:	24
Note: Due to the German occupation of Norway during World War II, no elections were held for new municipal councils until after the war ended in 1945.

=== Mayors ===
The mayor (Norwegian: ordfører) of Stokke Municipality was the political leader of the municipality and the chairperson of the municipal council. The following people have held this position:

- 1838–1841: Christian Richard Nygaard
- 1842–1843: Herman A. Klem
- 1843–1851: Ditman Ditmansen
- 1852–1853: Hans Mikkelsen
- 1854–1855: Ole Andersen
- 1856–1863: Ditman Ditmansen
- 1864–1865: Hans Christian Hansen
- 1866–1869: Johan Peder Andresen
- 1870–1886: Jørgen Hammelow Berg
- 1887–1897: Mathias L. Gjein (H)
- 1897–1898: Abraham Olsen (H)
- 1899–1901: Lars Sørensen Borge
- 1902–1904: Hans Mathias Korterød
- 1905–1910: Ragnvald Berg (V)
- 1911–1913: Ingvald Skorge (H)
- 1914–1919: Johan G. Austeen (V)
- 1920–1931: Ingvald Skorge (H)
- 1932–1941: Anders Ellefsen (H)
- 1941–1945: Lars Holt (NS)
- 1945–1946: Anders Ellefsen (H)
- 1946–1959: Olav O. Haugen (V)
- 1960–1963: Georg Aas (H)
- 1964–1971: Hans Wåle (Sp)
- 1972–1975: Oddvar Aas (H)
- 1976–1979: Tor Svensson (KrF)
- 1980–1987: Johnny Freitag (H)
- 1988–2003: Per-Eivind Johansen (H)
- 2003–2011: Nils Ingar Aabol (Ap)
- 2011–2016: Erlend Larsen (H)

== Geography ==
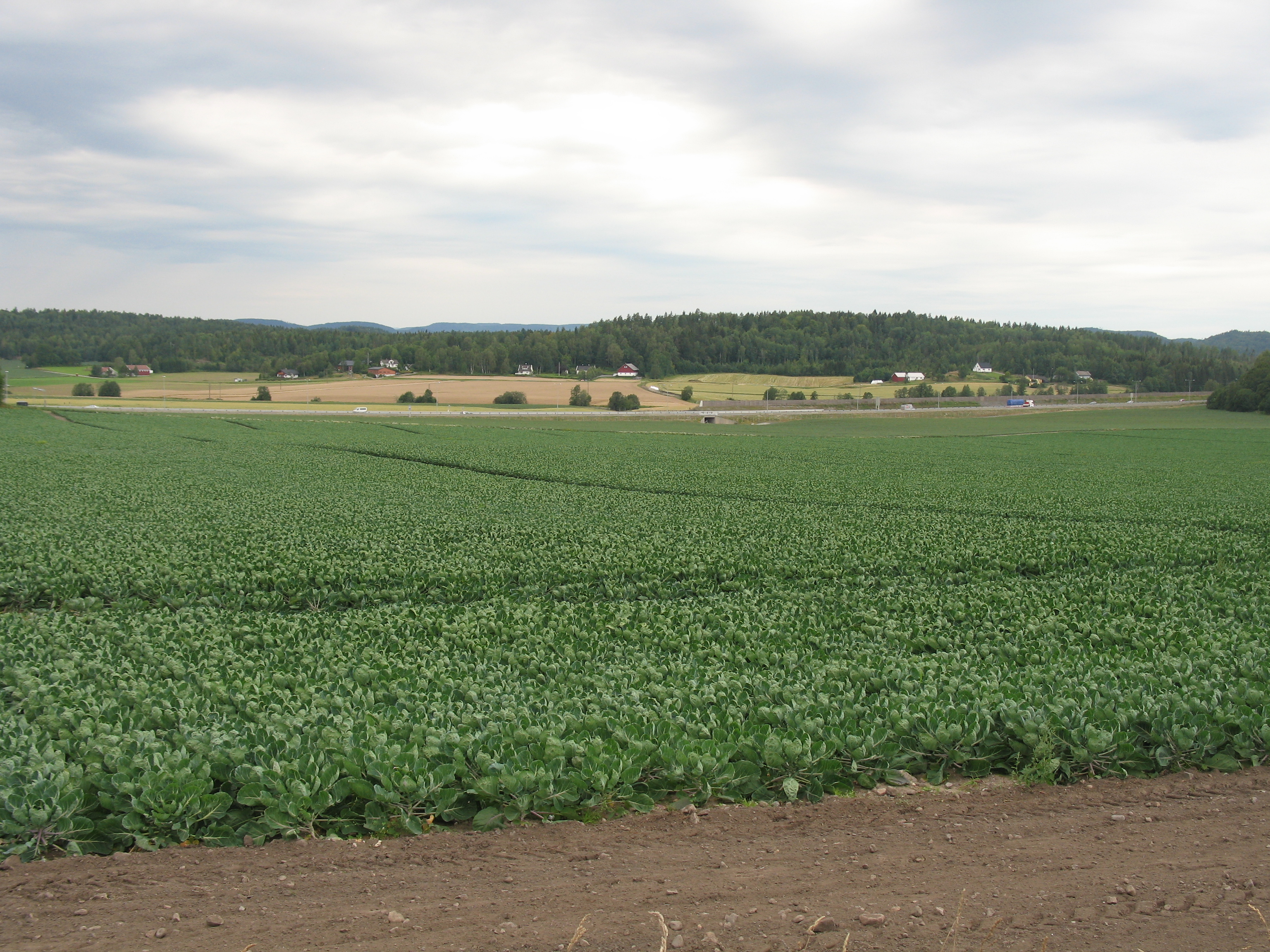
Brussels sprouts field in Stokke.

Stokke Municipality had a total area of 118 square kilometres (46 sq mi) and had a 14-kilometre (8.7 mi) long coastline along the Tønsbergfjord. The village of Stokke is located in-between the cities of Tønsberg and Sandefjord. However, Stokke Municipality was primarily a rural area and far smaller in population than its neighbors. Stokke Municipality had a variety of recreation areas, including the Storås area, which includes lakes, rivers, historic sites, and an abundance of plant and wildlife species. Another recreational site is located at Bogen, which also includes a beach and an art gallery. Other coastal communities include the villages of Vear, Melsomvik, and Storevar. Coastal islands included Langø, Ravnø, Gåsø, Gåsøkalven, Verjø, Tryteknatten, and others. Lakes include Akersvannet, Gjennestadvannet, Kulerødvannet, Fossnesdammen, and others. The highest point in the municipality was the 175.6-metre (576 ft) tall mountain Høgståsen, near the northern border of the municipality.

Both the Vestfoldbanen railway line and the European route E18 highway pass through the former municipality. Its highest point was Høgståsen at 175.6 metres (576 ft). The village of Stokke is home to a nature preserve known as Bokemoa, a birch forest located on Raet. The dense forest creates shade and a habitat for mushrooms; over 100 species of mushrooms have been recorded in Bokemoa, including species only found in birch tree forests.

Re Municipality was located to the north, Tønsberg Municipality was located to the east, Nøtterøy Municipality was located to the southeast, Sandefjord Municipality was located to the south, and Andebu Municipality was located to the west.

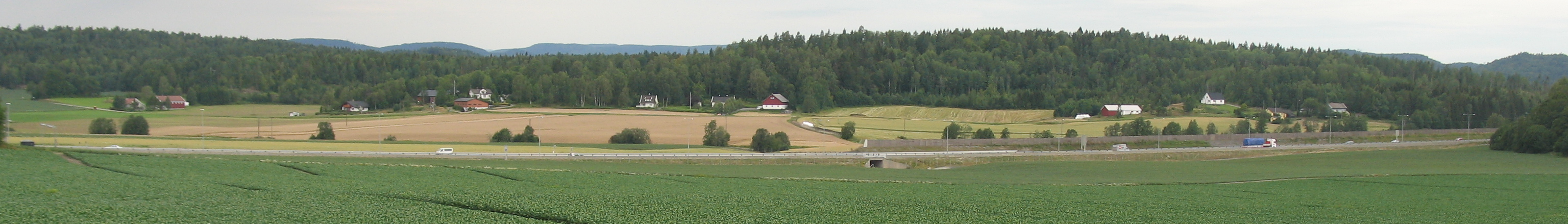
Panoramic view from Stokke.

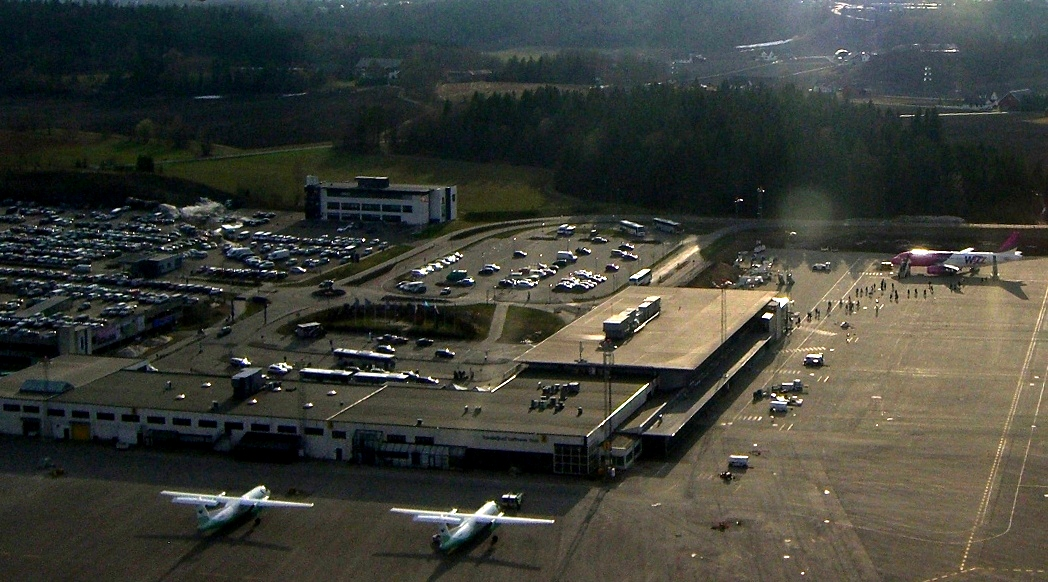
Sandefjord Airport.

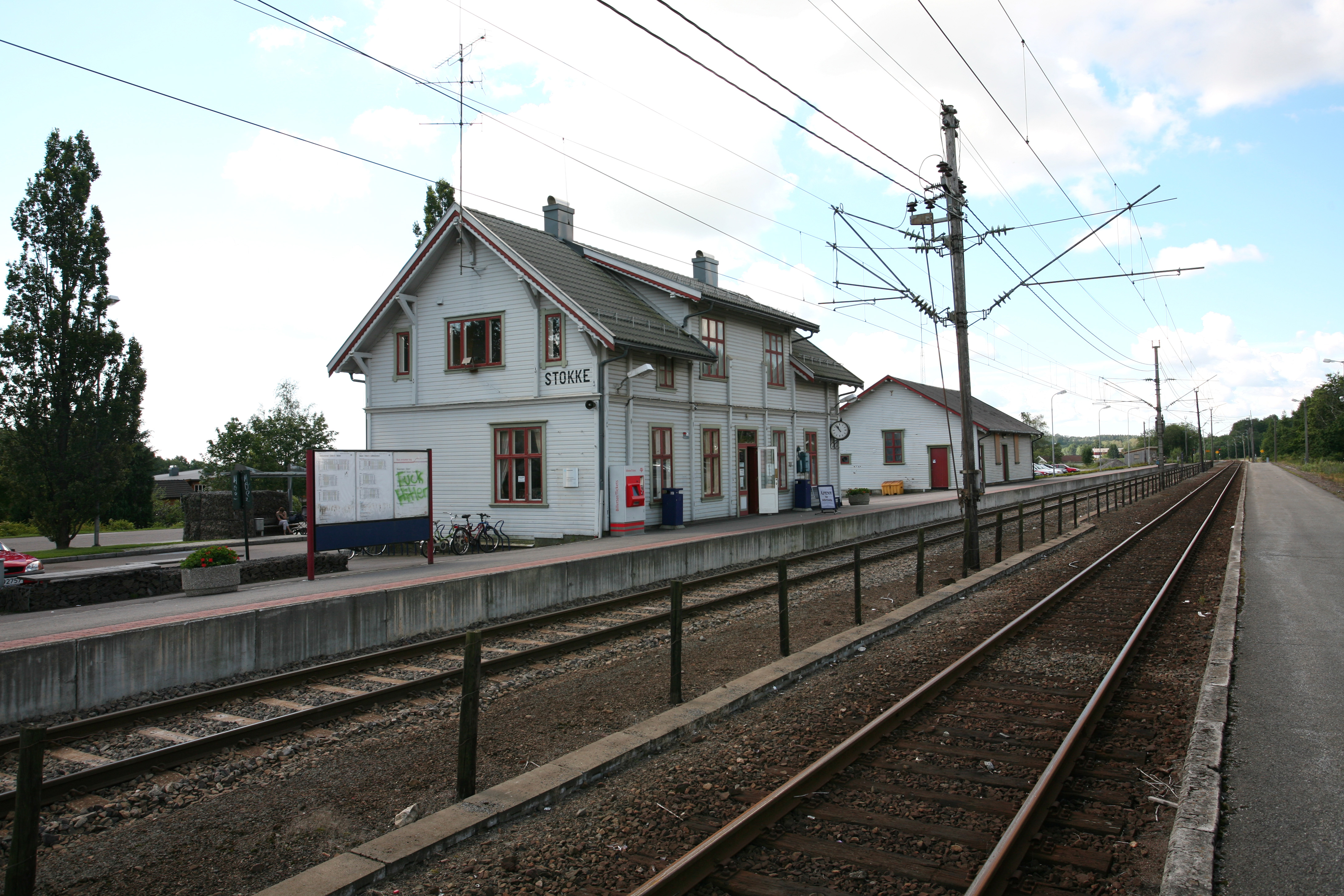
Stokke Station.

=== Nature preserves ===
Nature preserves in Stokke include the island of Langøya, Bokemoa, Melsomvik plant and wildlife preserve as well as the lakes Robergvannet and Akersvannet. The island of Langøya lies in the Tønsbergfjorden and is a car-free island consisting of meadows, knolls, salt meadows, small bays, and forests. It became a landscape conservation area in 2006. It is known for its wide variety of rare wildflowers including species such as sea thrift, alternate-leaved golden-saxifrage, cowslip, greater yellow-rattle, sticky catchfly, and many others.

=== Wildlife ===
Brown bears were common in Stokke Municipality until the 1850s, and until the early 1900s, a group of bears lived in the inner parts of Vestfold County. The last Brown bear shot in the county was in Lardal Municipality in 1916. The last bear to be shot in Stokke Municipality was around 1850 by Andreas Smitten of Russeltvet. A number of local place names derives from its former bears, including Bjønnemyra (Borgen), Bjønnestøkket (Bredholt), Bjønndal (Hauanlia), Bjønneleet (Nedre Anholt), and Bjønnelia (Askerød). Some place names also derive from the Gray wolf, including Ulvekula (Oserød) and Ulvehølet (Rørkollskogen). Other notable mammals in Stokke include the Red fox, European badger, European otter, European pine marten, Short-tailed weasel, European Lynx, Moose, Roe deer, Red deer, European beaver, Mountain hare, Red squirrel, European hedgehog, bats, mice, and rats.

== Demographics ==
The annual population growth in Stokke was twice as high as Vestfold County as a whole, and the expected life expectancy is higher than the county median. About 13 percent of Stokke's population were first- or second-generation immigrants as of 2014.

== Transportation ==
European route E18 passed through the former municipality. The Vestfoldbanen operated the Stokke Station, a railway station in the village of Stokke. Sandefjord Airport Torp was located on the former border with Sandefjord Municipality.

== Attractions ==
=== Recreation ===
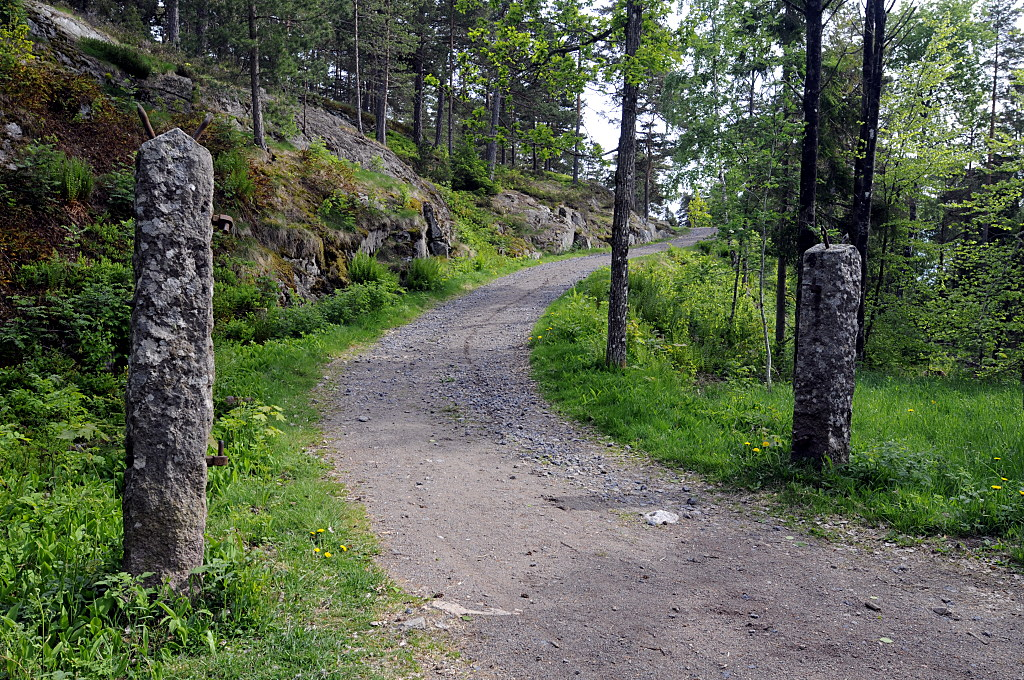
Trail to Sundås Fort.

Hiking trails can be found at Trælsodden, Løke, Høgåsen, Grorudvannet, Feen, Furulund, Ramsum, and Borgeskogen. Coastal hiking paths make up a total of 14 kilometres (8.7 mi) in former municipality. Coastal hiking trails can be found in Melsomvik and also a trail connecting Storevar and Rakkevik.

A 3-kilometre (1.9 mi) forest hike can be found at Løke, which is a popular forest for collecting mushrooms. A mountain trail is located by Høgåsen, the highest point in the former municipality with an elevation of 172 metres (564 ft). The peak could be reached from two trails: from Langevann in Re Municipality or from Grorudvannet in Stokke Municipality. The shortest hike is from Grorudvannet.

Trælsodden by the Tønsbergfjorden is home to several burial mounds as well as fortifications dated to World War II. Sandy beaches, diving boards and hiking trails can also be found at Trælsodden. At Trælsodden are graves dated to the Iron Age. At the time, sea levels were 4–5 metres (13–16 ft) higher than today, and the graves were consequentially placed near the shoreline. A popular fishing site is located between Trælsodden and Brunstad. The trail goes by the municipal beach at Brunstad, immediately south of Oslofjord Convention Center. During summers, convenience stores and seafood restaurants are open at Brunstad. From Brunstad, the coastal path heads inwards and passes through the Himalayapark, a park offering tree climbing. The trail passes by a home built by singer Jahn Teigen, known as "Teigen's Pyramid". The trail reaches a beach before entering the boat harbor in Rakkevik. It is a 3.5-kilometre (2.2 mi) hike from Storevar to Melsomvik, and a similar distance between Melsomvik and Brunstad.

=== Points of interest ===
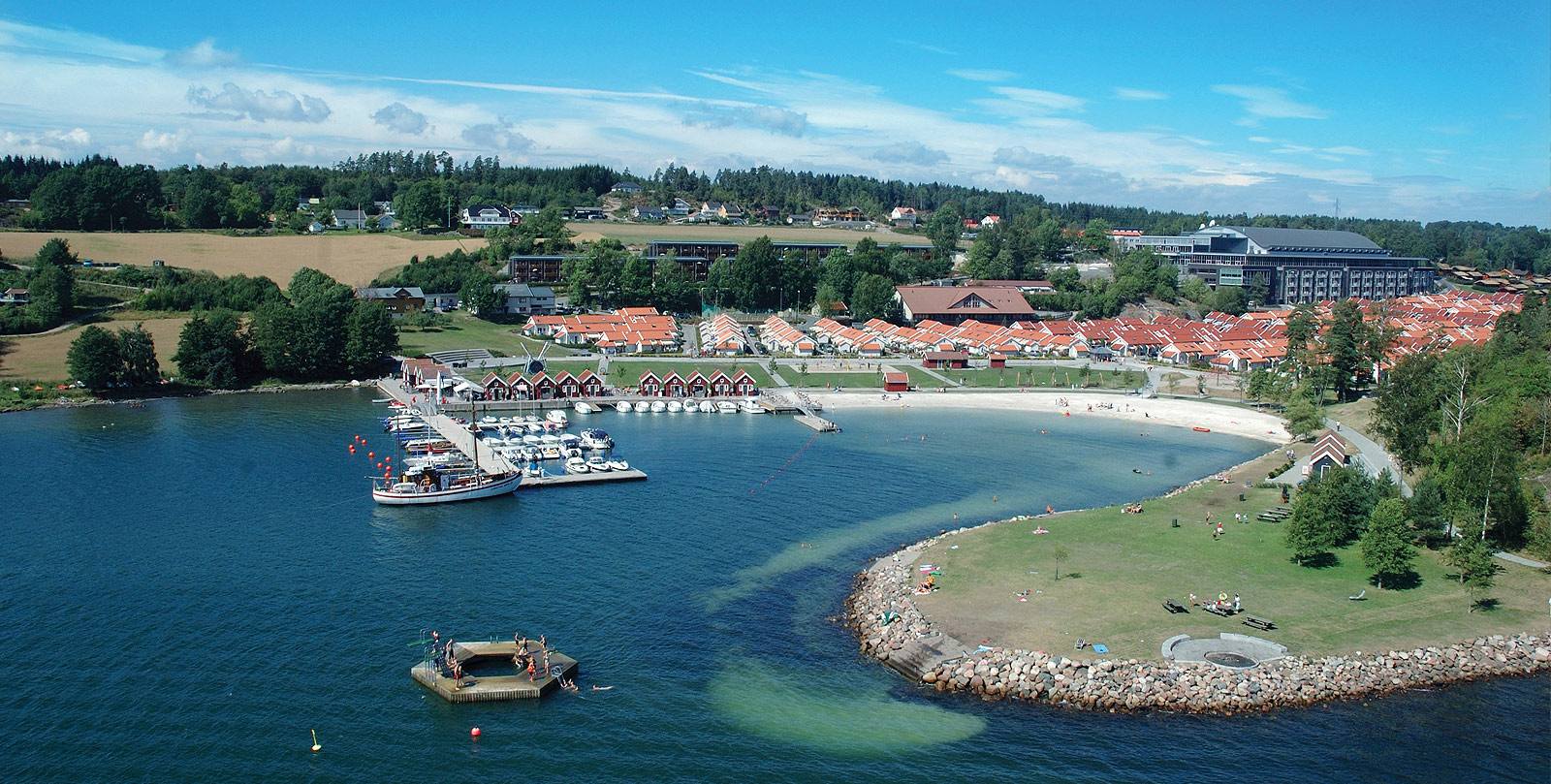
Oslofjord Convention Center.

- Stokke Bygdetun, the oldest village museum in Vestfold County, established in 1978
- Sundås Fort, a fort from 1899 that was constructed during the Union between Sweden and Norway
- Trælsodden, a beach and remains from fortifications and burial mounds.
- Brunstad Beach
- Oslofjord Convention Center
- Stokke Station, a railway station operated by Vestfoldbanen
- Bokemoa, a birch tree forest and nature preserve on Raet
- Bogen, a beach and hiking trails
- Storevar, a small coastal village
- Stokke Church, a brick church by architect Jacob Wilhelm Nordan from 1886

== Notable people ==
- Einar Tørnquist, a TV-personality, talk-show host, and podcaster
- Lise Davidsen, an opera singer

== See also ==
- List of former municipalities of Norway
