= Renate Sølversen =

Norwegian politician

Renate Sølversen (born 27 October 1989) is a Norwegian politician for the Conservative Party.

She was a member of Stokke municipal council from 2011 to 2016, when Stokke ceased as its own municipality. In 2015, she was elected to Vestfold county council. She served as a deputy representative to the Parliament of Norway from Vestfold during the term 2017–2021.
