= Langøy =

Langøy or Langøya can refer to:

== Places ==
- Langøya, a large island located in Vesterålen in Nordland county, Norway
- Langøya, Sandefjord, an island in Sandefjord municipality in Vestfold county, Norway
- Langøy, Møre og Romsdal, a village in Averøy municipality in Møre og Romsdal county, Norway
- Langøy, Telemark, an island in Kragerø municipality in Telemark county, Norway
- Langøy, or Lang Island (Antarctica), an island in Antarctica

== People ==
- Leif-Arne Langøy (born 1956), a Norwegian businessperson

== See also ==
- Langøyene, "the Langøy islands" in Oslo, Norway
