= Langøya, Sandefjord =

Island in Vestfold, Norway

Langøya Langø Langøy
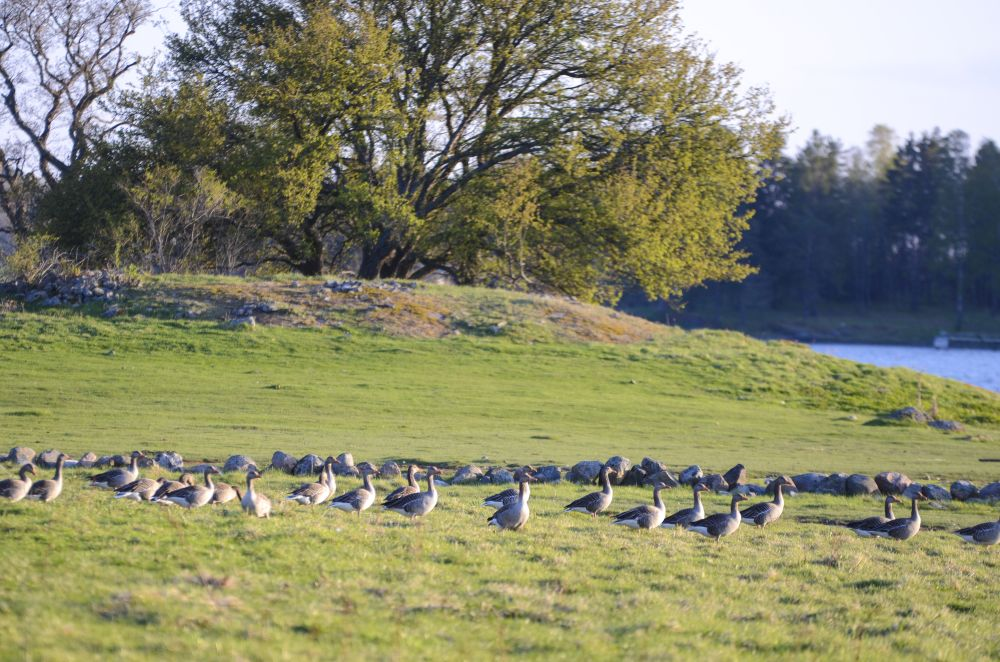
- Grey geese at Langøya island
- Interactive map of the island

Geography
- Location: Vestfold, Norway
- Coordinates: 59.16264°N 10.3282°E
- Area: 0.55 km^{2} (0.21 sq mi)
- Length: 1.5 km (0.93 mi)

Administration
- Norway
- County: Vestfold
- Municipality: Sandefjord Municipality

Langøya is an island in Sandefjord Municipality in Vestfold county, Norway. The 0.55-square-kilometre (140-acre; 55 ha) island is located in the Tønsbergfjorden, just outside the village of Skravestad. The island is accessible through a bridge that connects to the road Sandsveien. The island was named for its long shape. The 1.5-kilometre (0.93 mi) long island has an area of 550 decares (0.55 km^{2}; 140 acres). It consists of farm fields, hills, and forests.

It is a car-free island consisting of meadows, knolls, salt meadows, small bays, and forests. It became a landscape conservation area in 2006. It is known for its wide variety of rare wildflowers including species such as sea thrift, alternate-leaved golden-saxifrage, cowslip, greater yellow-rattle, sticky catchfly, and many others.

== History ==
Five burial mounds from the Bronze Age have been discovered on the island. Throughout most of the 1600s, the island belonged to residents of Tønsberg. In the 1660s, it was purchased and managed from Skravestad in Stokke.

Historically, the island had been a part of Sandeherred Municipality and Stokke Municipality. The small Skravestadholmen cape area in the southwestern part of the island was part of Sandeherred Municipality (which later became part of Sandefjord Municipality). The rest of the island was part of Stokke Municipality which also became part of Sandefjord in 2016.

== See also ==
- List of islands of Norway
