= Vear =

Village in Vestfold, Norway

- Village
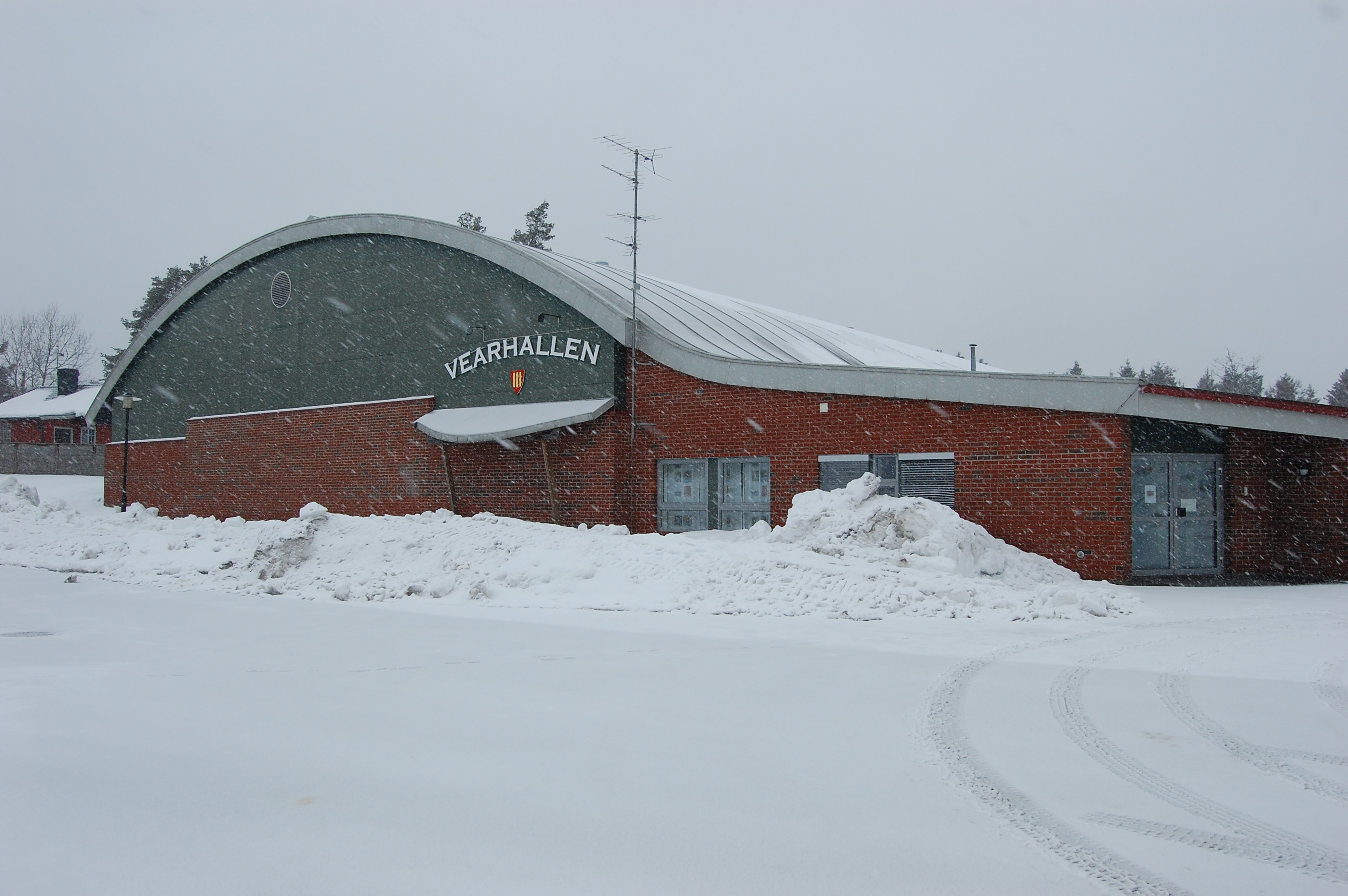
- View of the village indoor arena, Vearhallen
- Interactive map of Vear
- Coordinates: 59.25939°N 10.36091°E
- Country: Norway
- Region: Eastern Norway
- County: Vestfold
- Municipality: Tønsberg Municipality

Area
  - Total: 2.28 km^{2} (0.88 sq mi)
- Elevation: 42 m (138 ft)

Population (2026)
  - Total: 3,876
  - Density: 1,700/km^{2} (4,400/sq mi)
- Time zone: UTC+01:00 (CET)
  - Summer (DST): UTC+02:00 (CEST)
- Post Code: 3173 Vear

Vear is a village in Tønsberg Municipality in Vestfold county, Norway. The village is located along the border with Sandefjord Municipality and along the Tønsbergfjorden, about 5 kilometres (3.1 mi) to the southwest of the city of Tønsberg and about 3 kilometres (1.9 mi) to the southeast of the village of Sem. The village lies along Norwegian County Road 303 between Melsomvik and Tønsberg.

The 2.28-square-kilometre (560-acre) village has a population (2026) of 3,876 and a population density of 1,700 inhabitants per square kilometre (4,400/sq mi).

== History ==
The village had historically grown up along border between Sem Municipality and Stokke Municipality, with certain parts of the village located on either side of the border, but the majority of the village was in Stokke Municipality. Stokke Municipality established an elementary- and middle school at Vear in 1974. Later, in 1988, Sem Municipality was merged into Tønsberg Municipality. In 1989, Tønsberg Municipality established an elementary school at Hogsnes. Vear and neighboring Hogsnes have grown together and make up one residential community.

On 1 January 2017, Stokke Municipality was merged with Sandefjord Municipality, but the village of Vear did not. Vear residents decided to leave Stokke Municipality in order to merge into neighboring Tønsberg Municipality. Turnout for the ballot was big with 72.9 percent of eligible voters. 63.8 percent of Vear residents decided to transfer to Tønsberg Municipality, while 34.1 percent preferred to follow Stokke Municipality into Sandefjord Municipality. At that time, Vear was home to about 2,500 residents, which made up about 22 percent of Stokke Municipality's total population prior to the merge.
