= Sundås battery =

Historical Norwegian landmark

Coordinates: 59.1745°N 10.3268°E

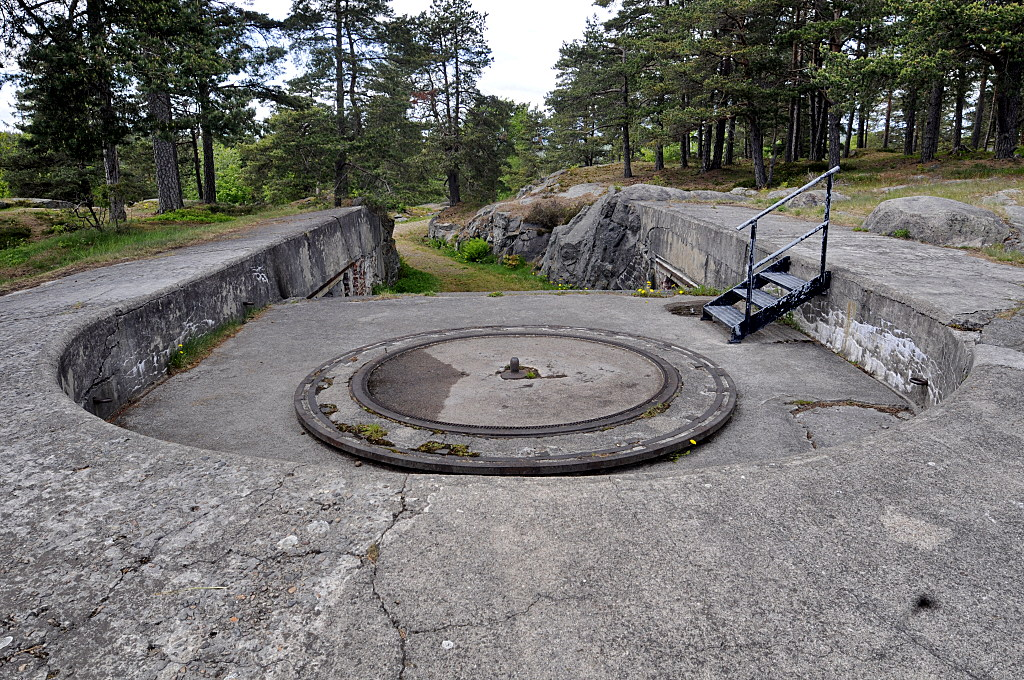

Sundås battery (Norwegian: Sundås batteri) is a defunct coastal artillery site located at Sundåsen in Sandefjord Municipality (historically part of Stokke Municipality) in Vestfold county, Norway. The fortifications were constructed in 1899 during turbulent times with Sweden during the Union between Sweden and Norway. It was part of the newly established Norwegian Coastal Artillery (Kystartilleriet). The fort was erected to keep potential enemies from entering the Tønsberg area by sea, and was also meant to protect the Marine harbor in the village of Melsomvik. Work on the fort began in 1897, and the forts at both Håøya Island and Sundåsen were completed in 1899. Trenches, commando posts, fencing, concrete gun pits, and other remains from the fort can still be seen at Sundås. The fort lies by the Tønsbergfjorden with surrounding views of Færder Lighthouse and islands such as Håøya, Tjøme, Veierland, and Nøtterøy. The cannons were dismantled by German occupational forces in 1942 during the German occupation of Norway and moved to other fortifications elsewhere in Norway. After the war, the battery reverted to the Norwegian Armed Forces who managed the property until 1962 when an agreement for maintenance and management was made with the municipality in return for public access. In 2005, the area was sold to Stokke municipality.

The fortifications were originally constructed to protect the marine harbor in Melsomvik from a potential Swedish invasion. Views from the fort include the Tønsbergfjord, the Swedish coastline in the east, and the Skrim mountains in the west.

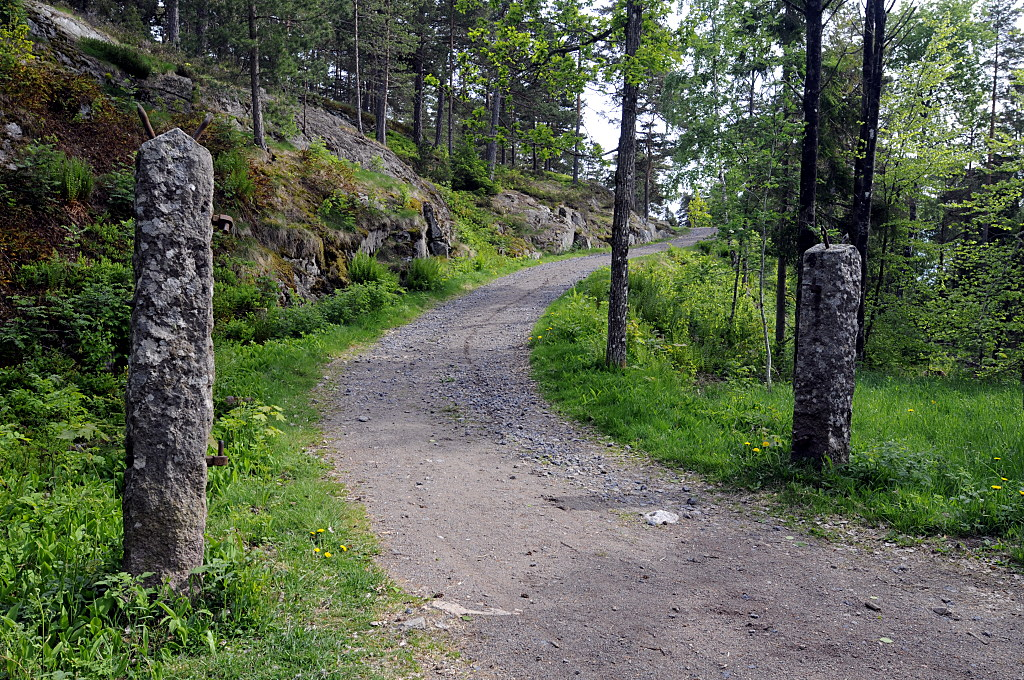

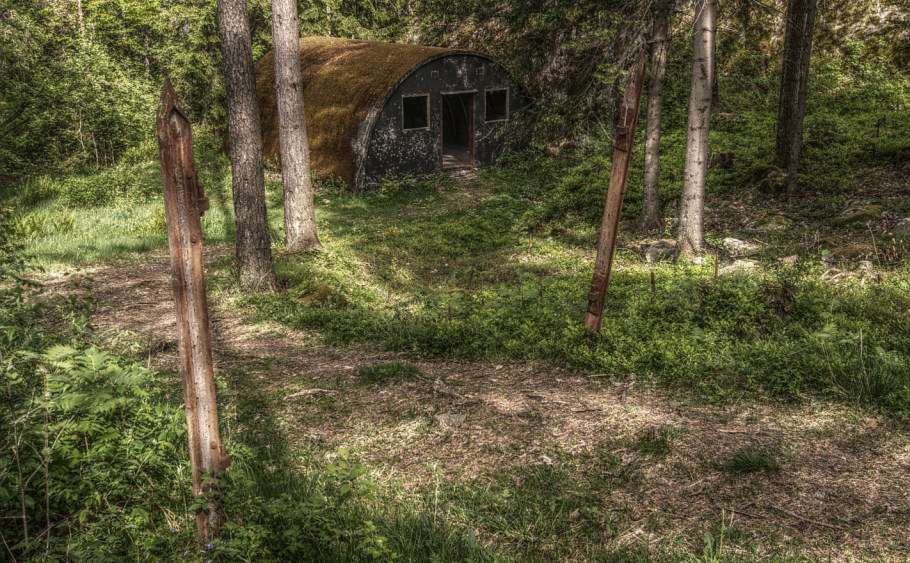

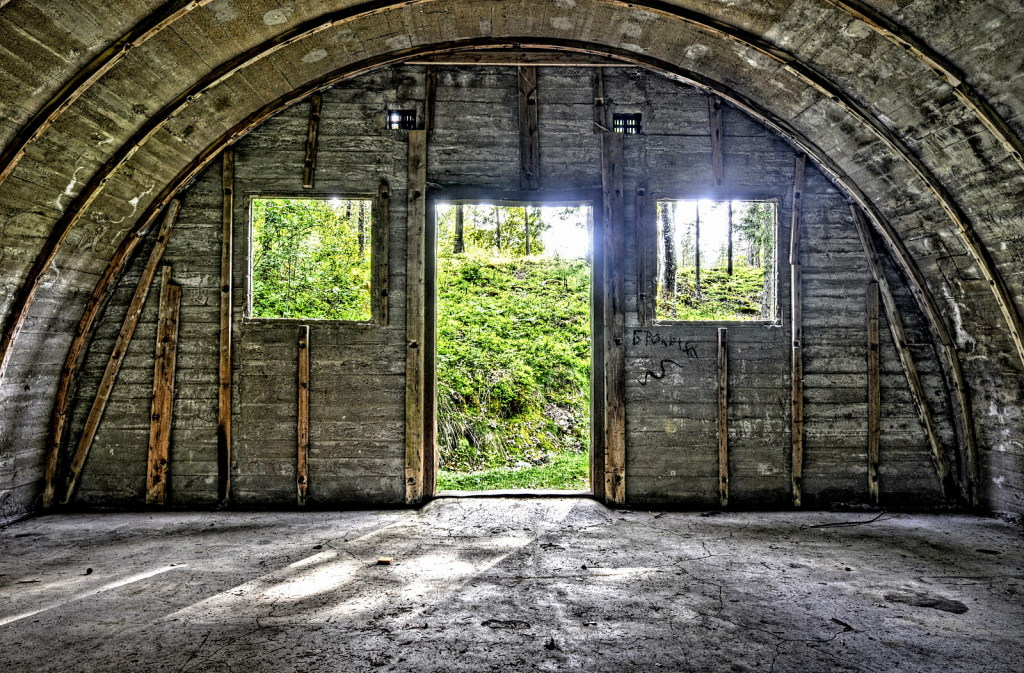

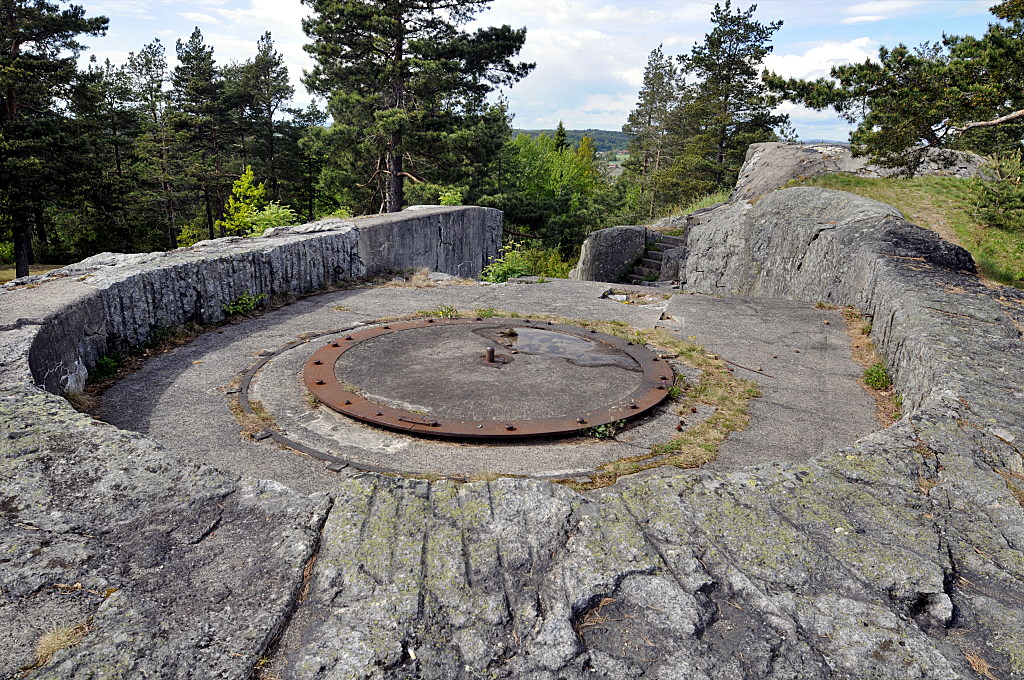

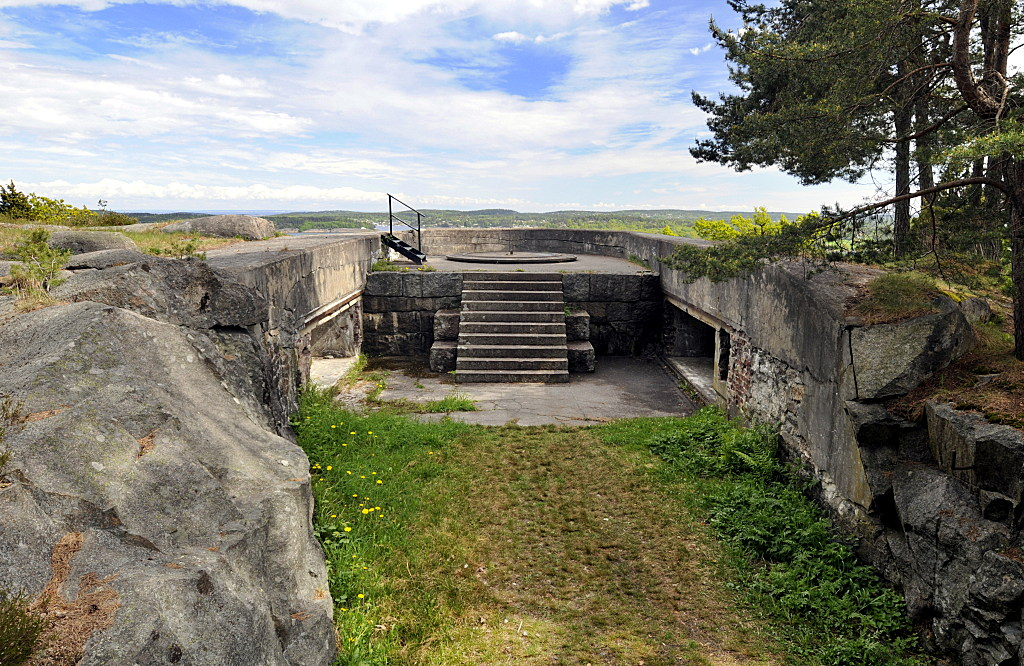

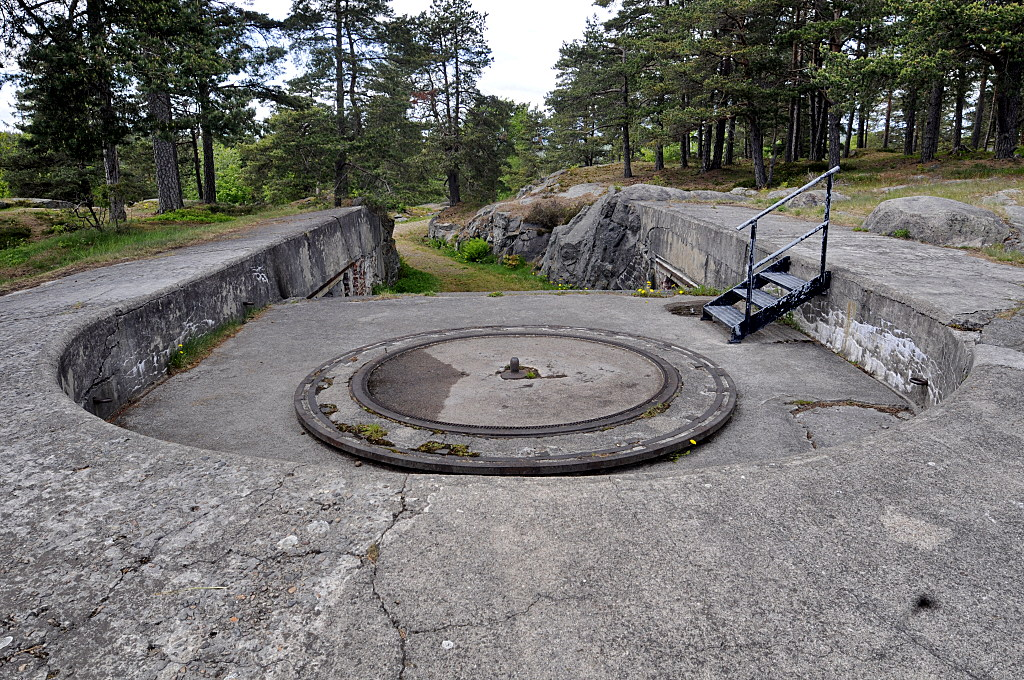

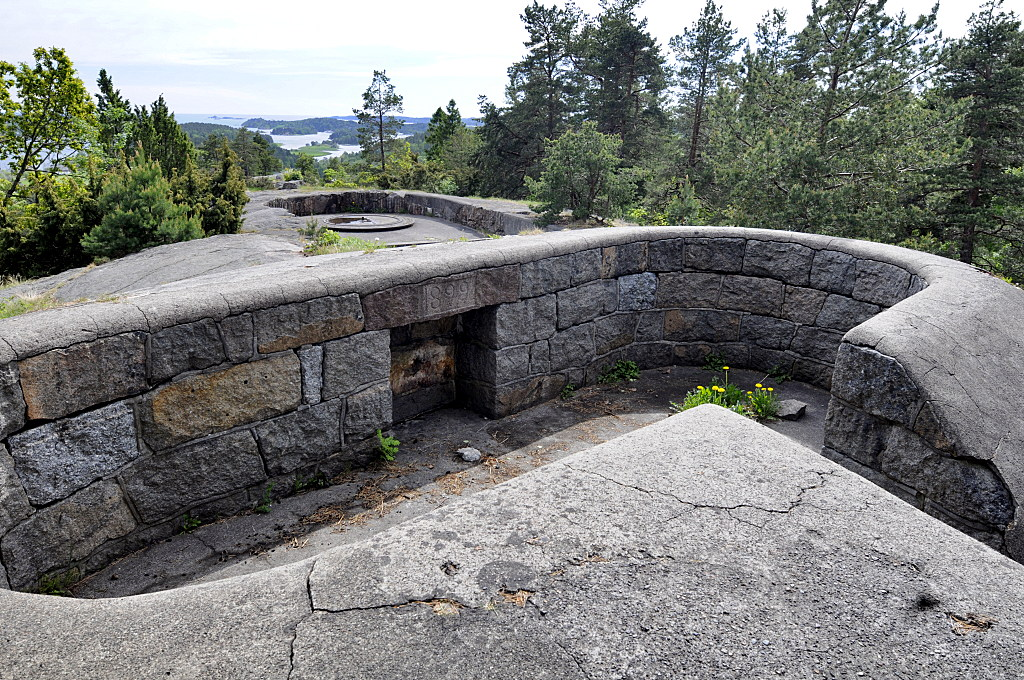

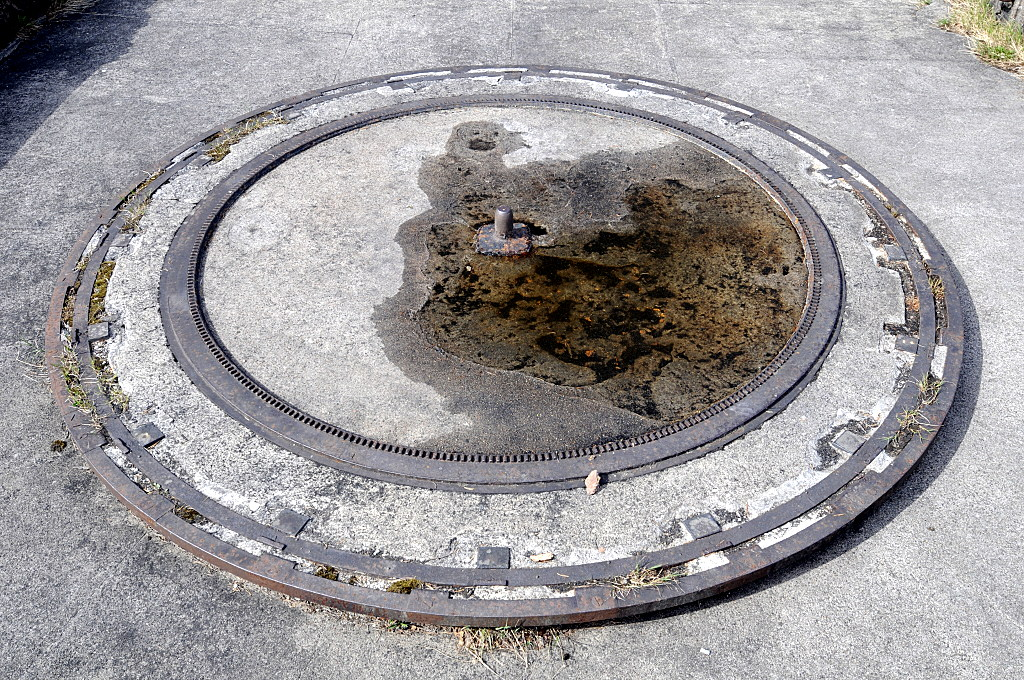

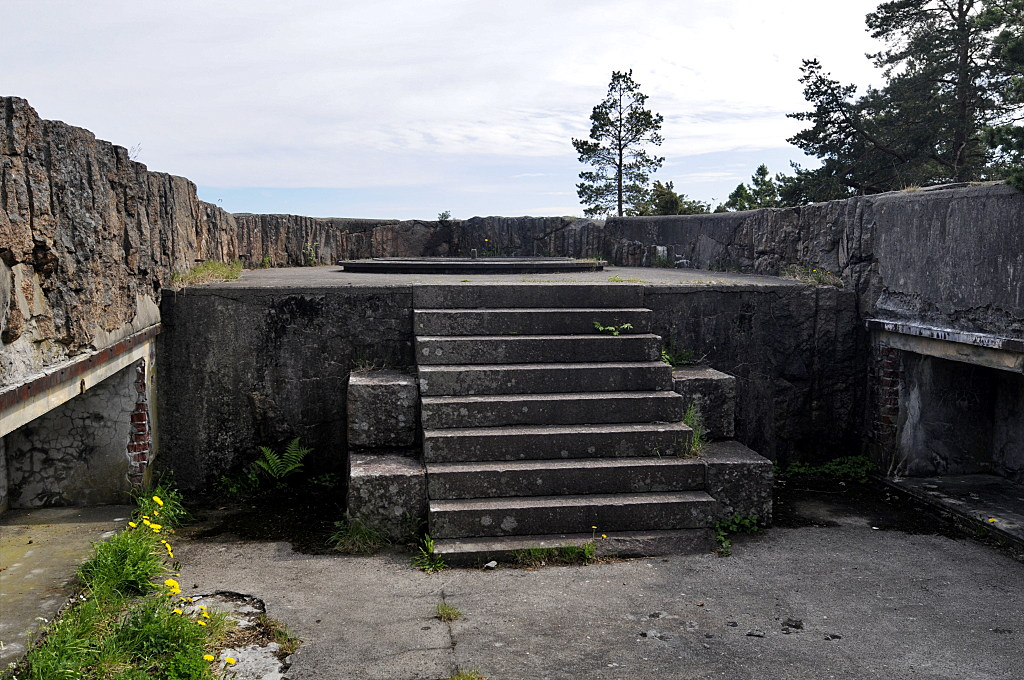

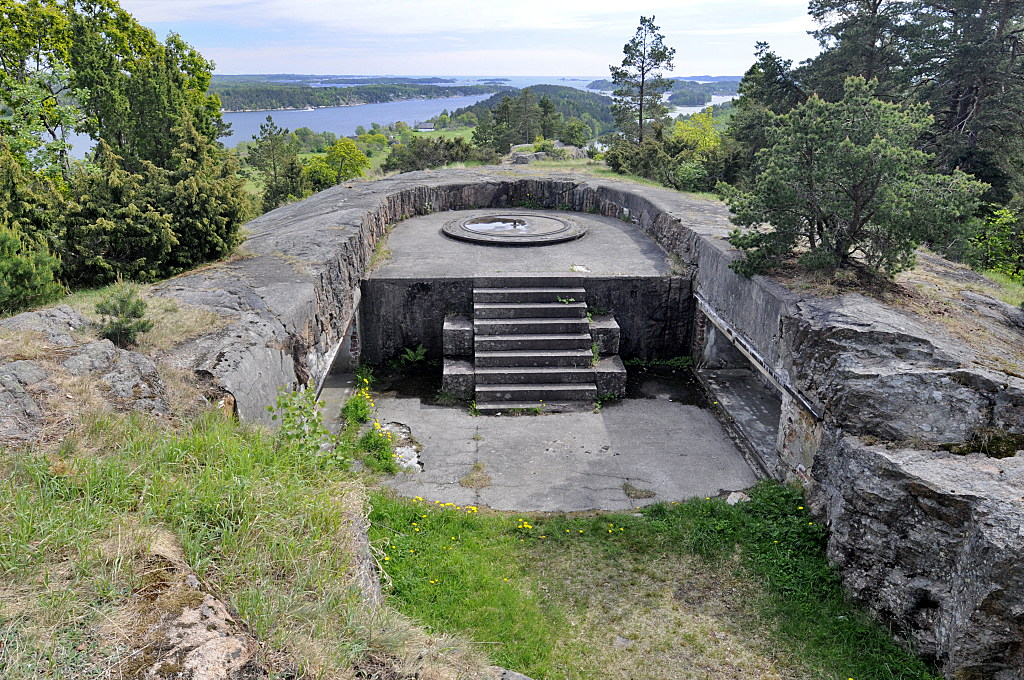

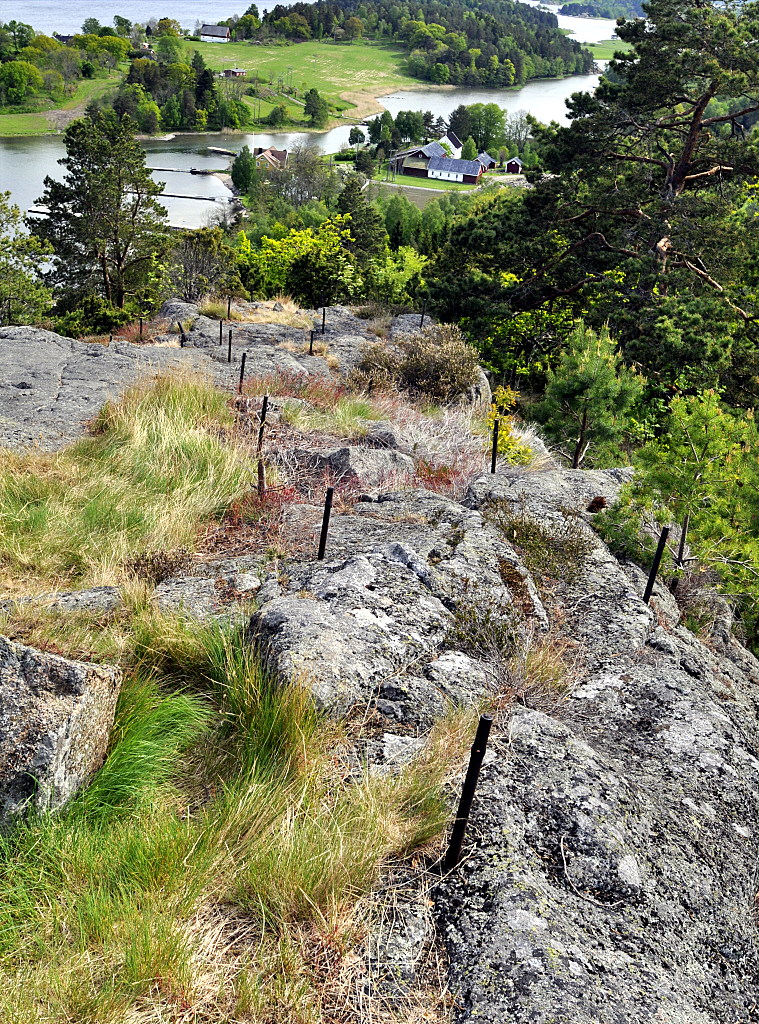

== See also ==
- Melsomvik
- List of forts in Norway
