= Skjee Church =

Church in Vestfold, Norway

- Skjee kirke
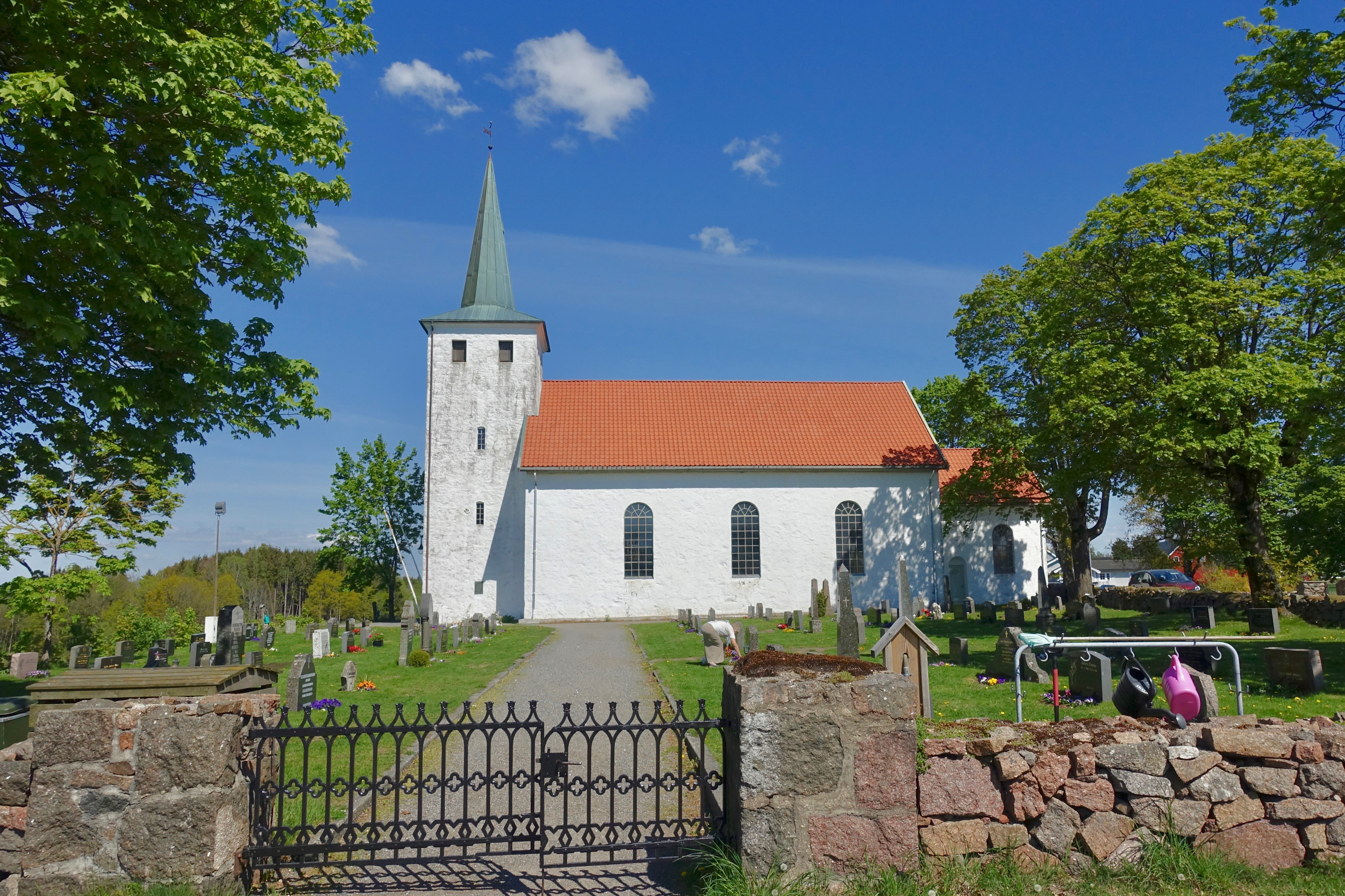
- View of the church
- Skjee Church
- 59°14′11″N 10°16′52″E
- Location: Sandefjord Municipality, Vestfold
- Country: Norway
- Denomination: Church of Norway
- Previous denomination: Catholic Church
- Churchmanship: Evangelical Lutheran

History
- Status: Parish church
- Founded: 12th century
- Consecrated: 12th century

Architecture
- Functional status: Active
- Architectural type: Long church
- Completed: c. 1100 (926 years ago)

Specifications
- Capacity: 320
- Materials: Stone

Administration
- Diocese: Tunsberg
- Deanery: Sandefjord prosti
- Parish: Skjee
- Norwegian Cultural Heritage Site
- Type: Church
- Status: Automatically protected
- ID: 85458

Skjee Church (Norwegian: Skjee kirke) is a parish church of the Church of Norway in Sandefjord Municipality in Vestfold county, Norway. It is located in the village of Skjee. It is the church for the Skjee parish which is part of the Sandefjord prosti (deanery) in the Diocese of Tunsberg. The white, stone church was built in a long church design around the year 1200 using plans drawn up by an unknown architect. The church seats about 320 people.

== History ==
The earliest existing historical records of the church date back to the year 1398, but the church was not built that year. The church was likely built in the early 12th century and it was originally dedicated to Saint Peter and Saint Paul. The Romanesque stone church was built on top of the Raet, a large terminal moraine left behind from the glaciers that retreated after the last Ice Age. The church included a rectangular nave and a smaller rectangular chancel to the east of the nave. Originally, there was a main door, or portal, on the west end and on the south side of the nave. In 1664, the south portal was bricked up and closed and a new church porch was built on the west end of the nave.

In 1673, Jarlsberg County was established on land that had belonged to the king. This meant that Skjee Church then became the property of the Count of Jarlsberg. For well over a hundred years, the church belonged to the county. In 1775, the church was sold to several larger landowners in the area who were parishioners of the church. Around 1845, the church was sold to the parish and the building at that time was deemed to be in need for improvements. In 1846 there was an extensive renovation, expanding the nave in width and length. The roof was removed and the long south wall of the nave was moved 1.5 metres (4 ft 11 in) to the south. The new wall had large window openings. Also, the nave was extended 6 metres (20 ft) to the east, incorporating the old chancel inside the same structure as the nave. In addition, it got a wooden west tower. Inside, second-floor seating galleries on two floors along the west and north walls. In 1932, the church was renovated again. A new stone choir was built to the east of the nave, since the old choir was part of the nave. In addition, furnishings such as the historic altarpiece and pulpit were brought back into the church. In 1936, the old wooden tower in the west was taken down and a new stone tower was built to replace it.

== Media gallery ==
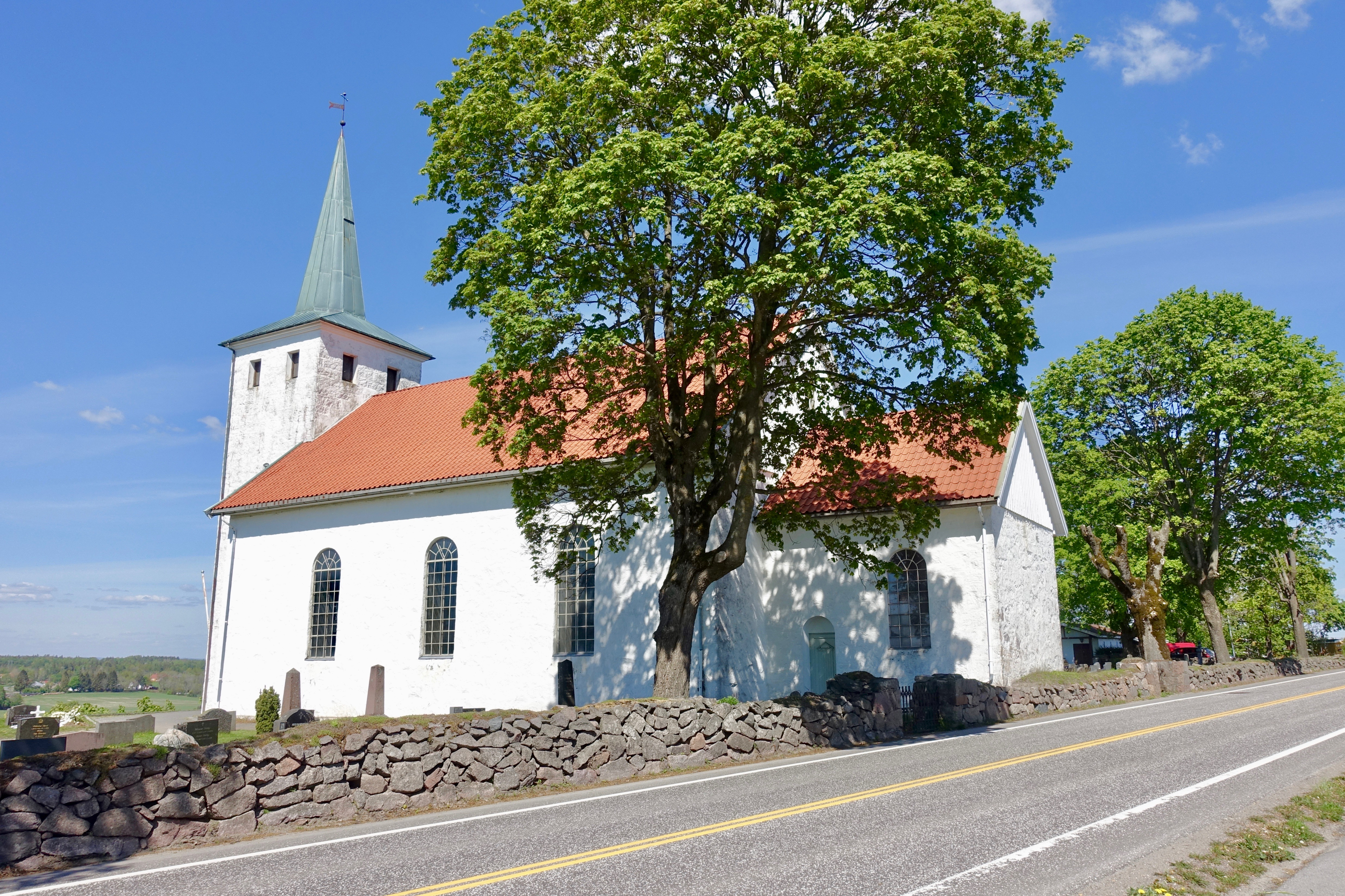

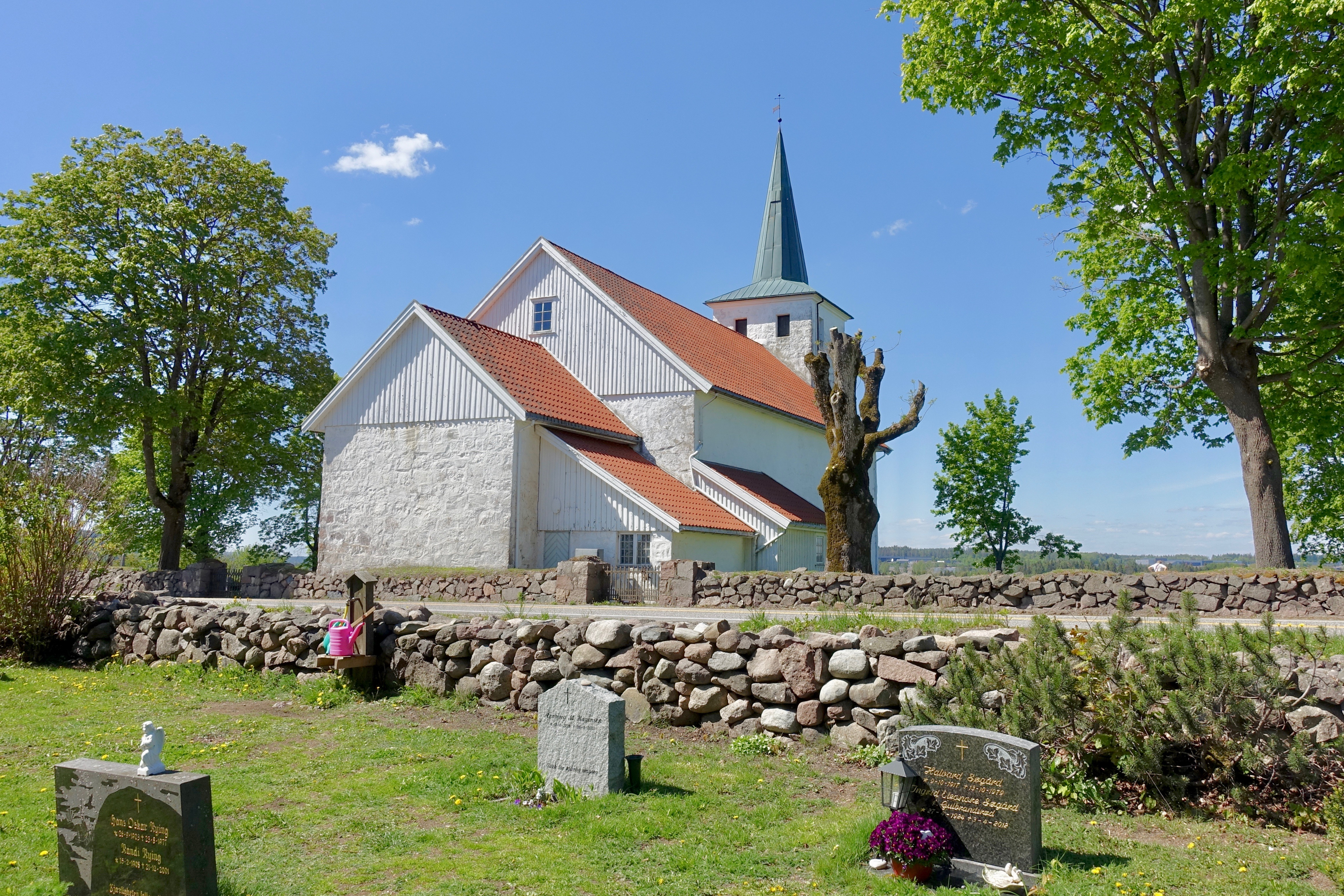

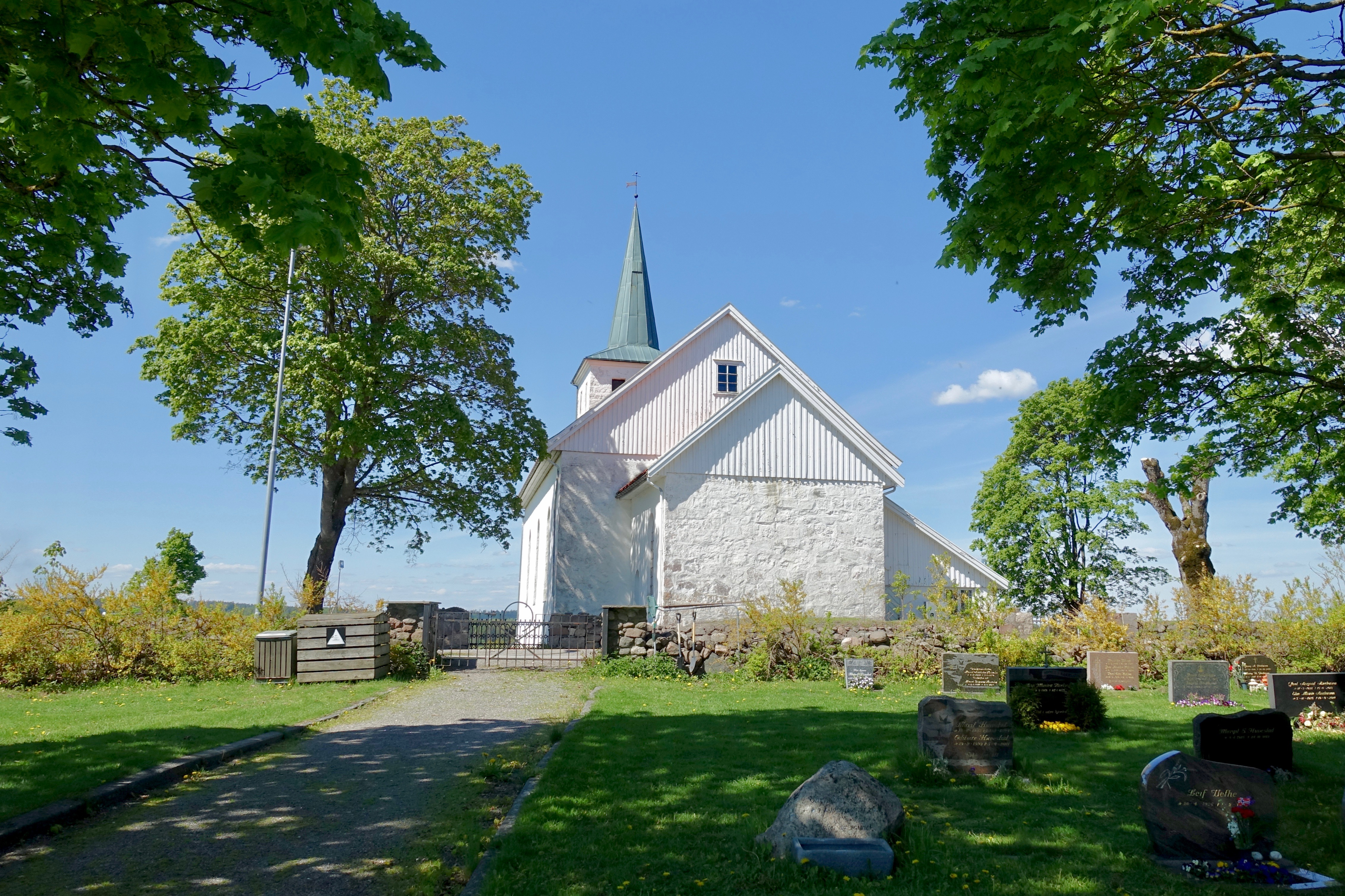

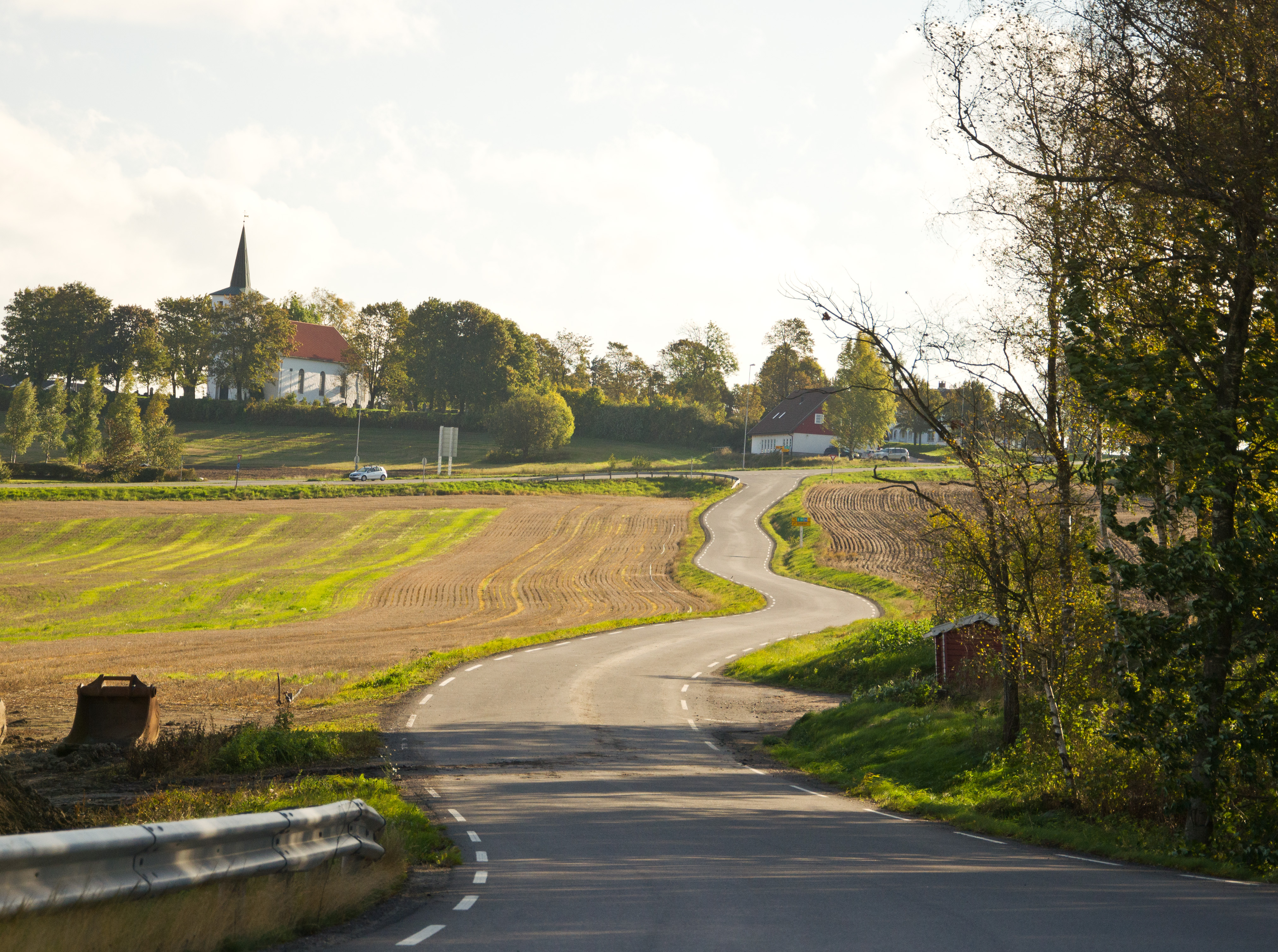

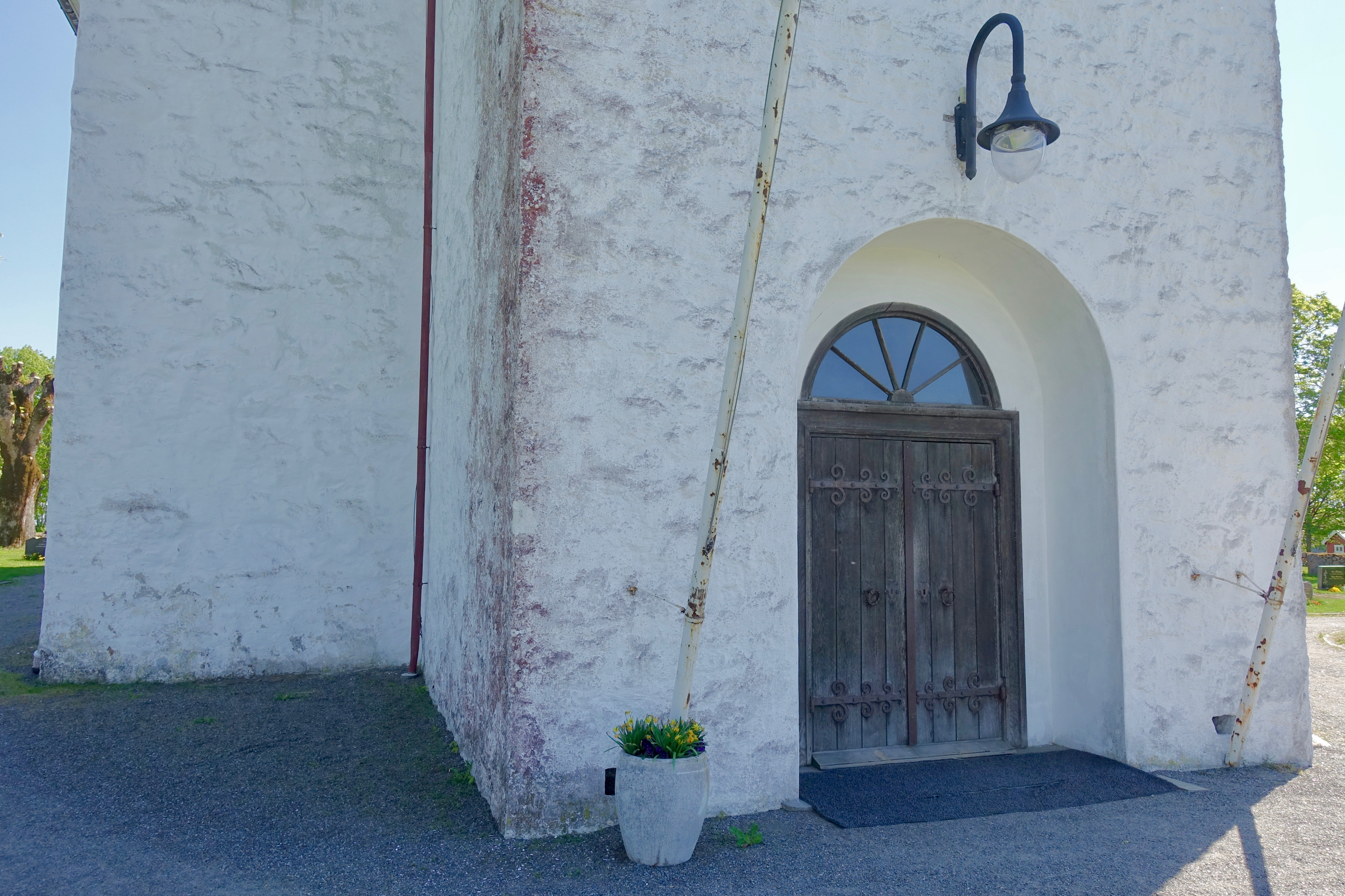

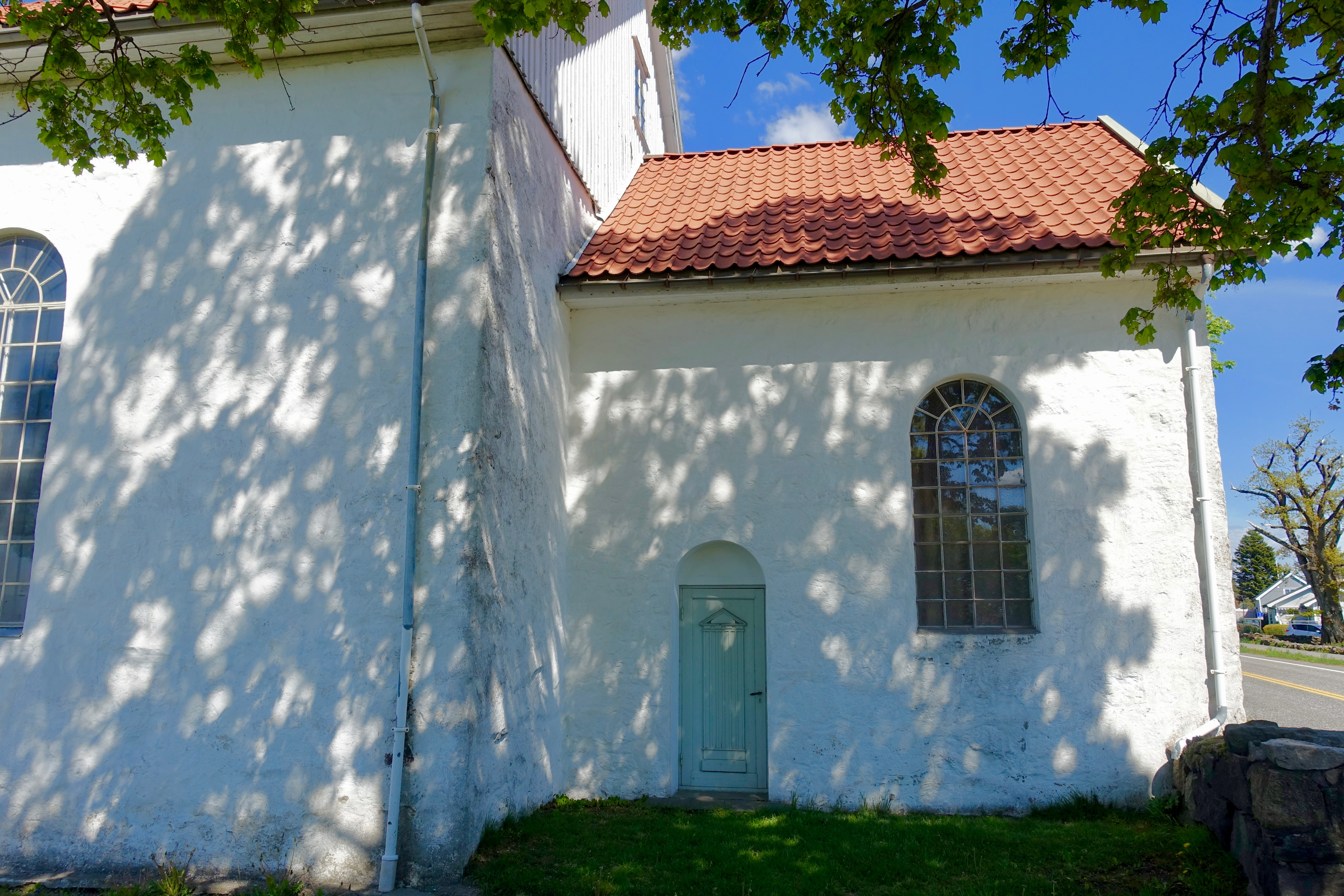

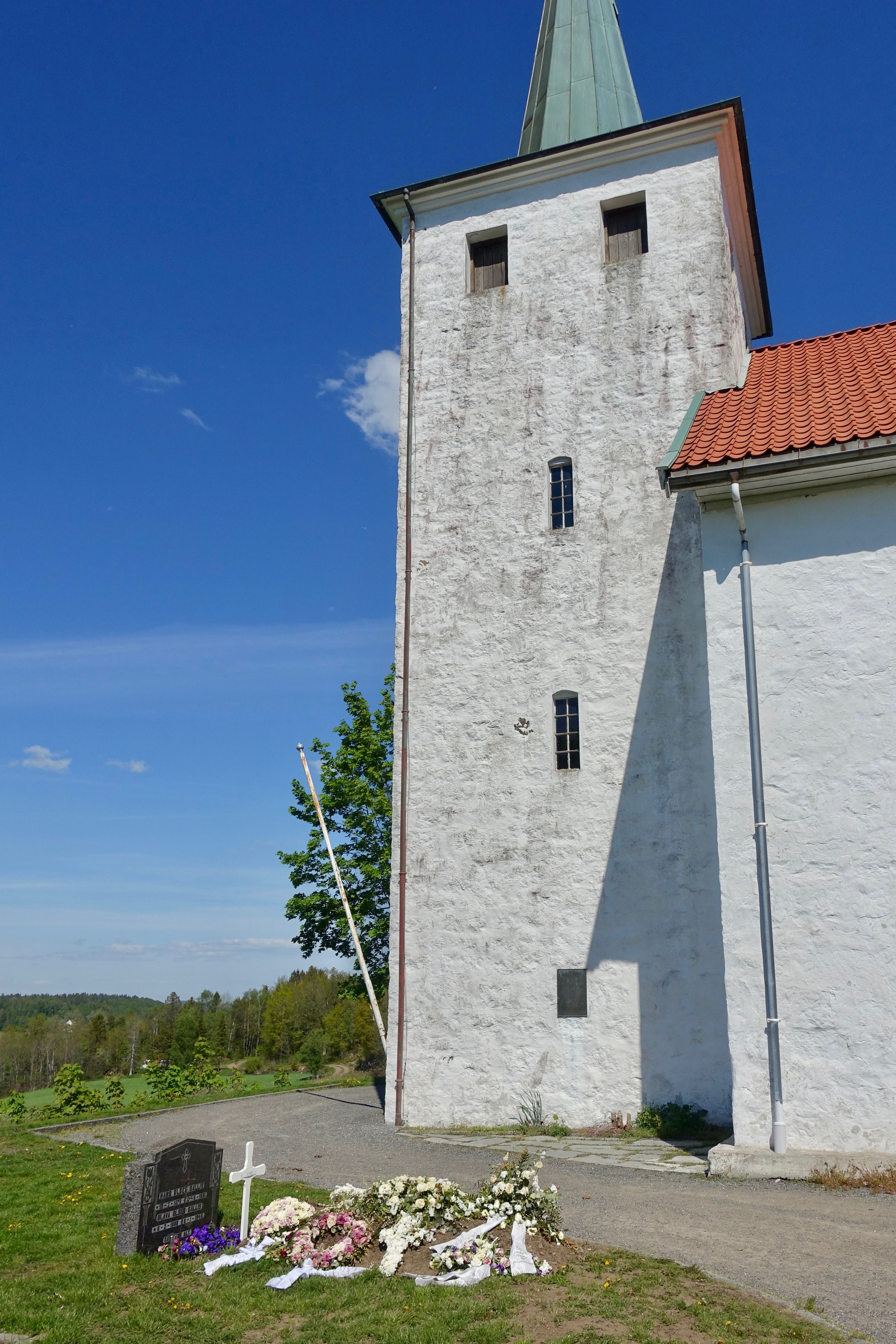

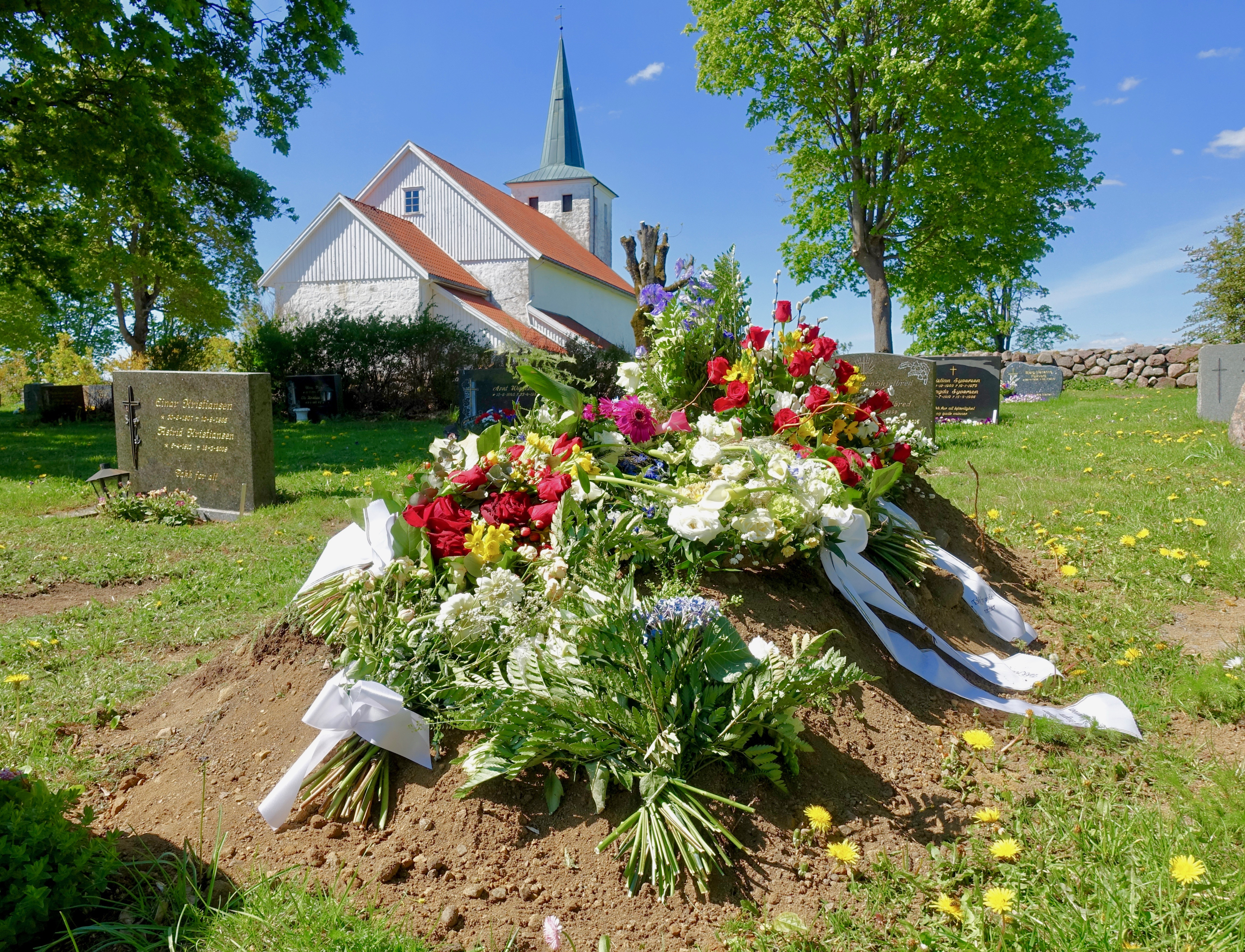

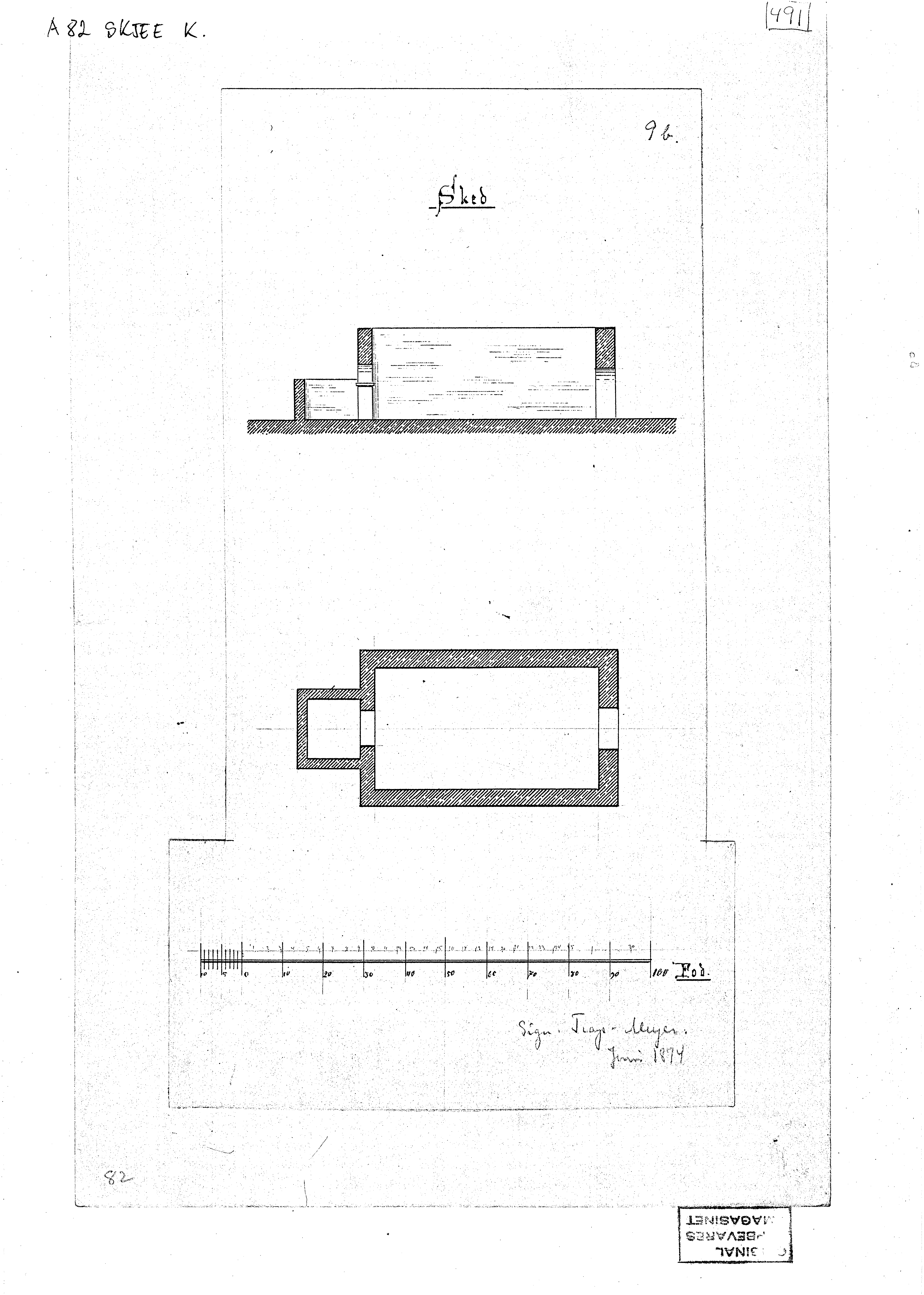

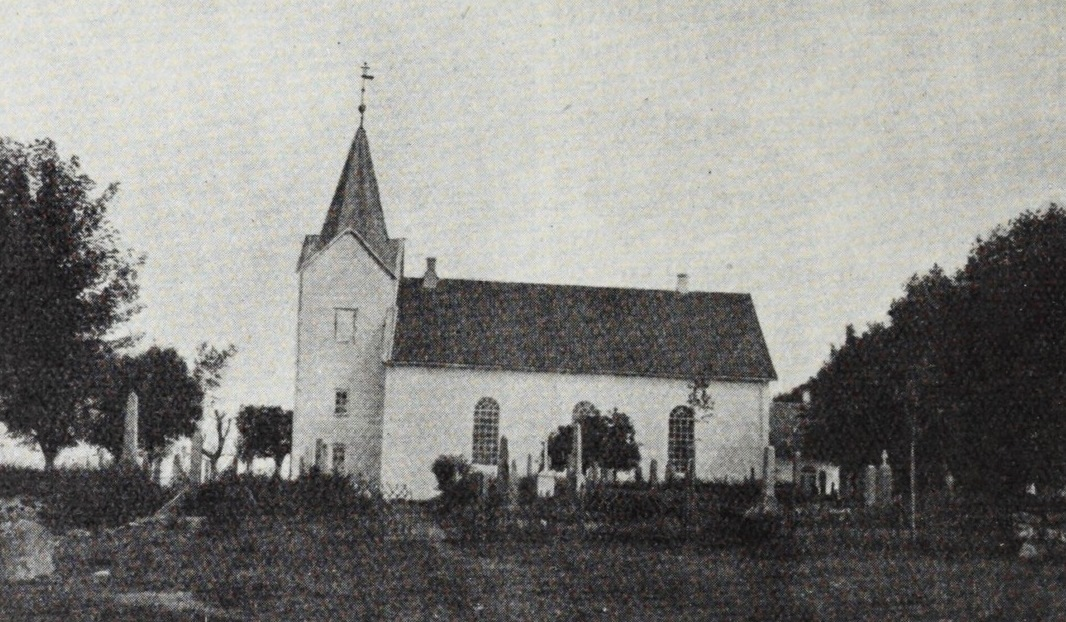

== See also ==
- List of churches in Tunsberg
