= Stokke Church =

Church in Vestfold, Norway

- Stokke kirke
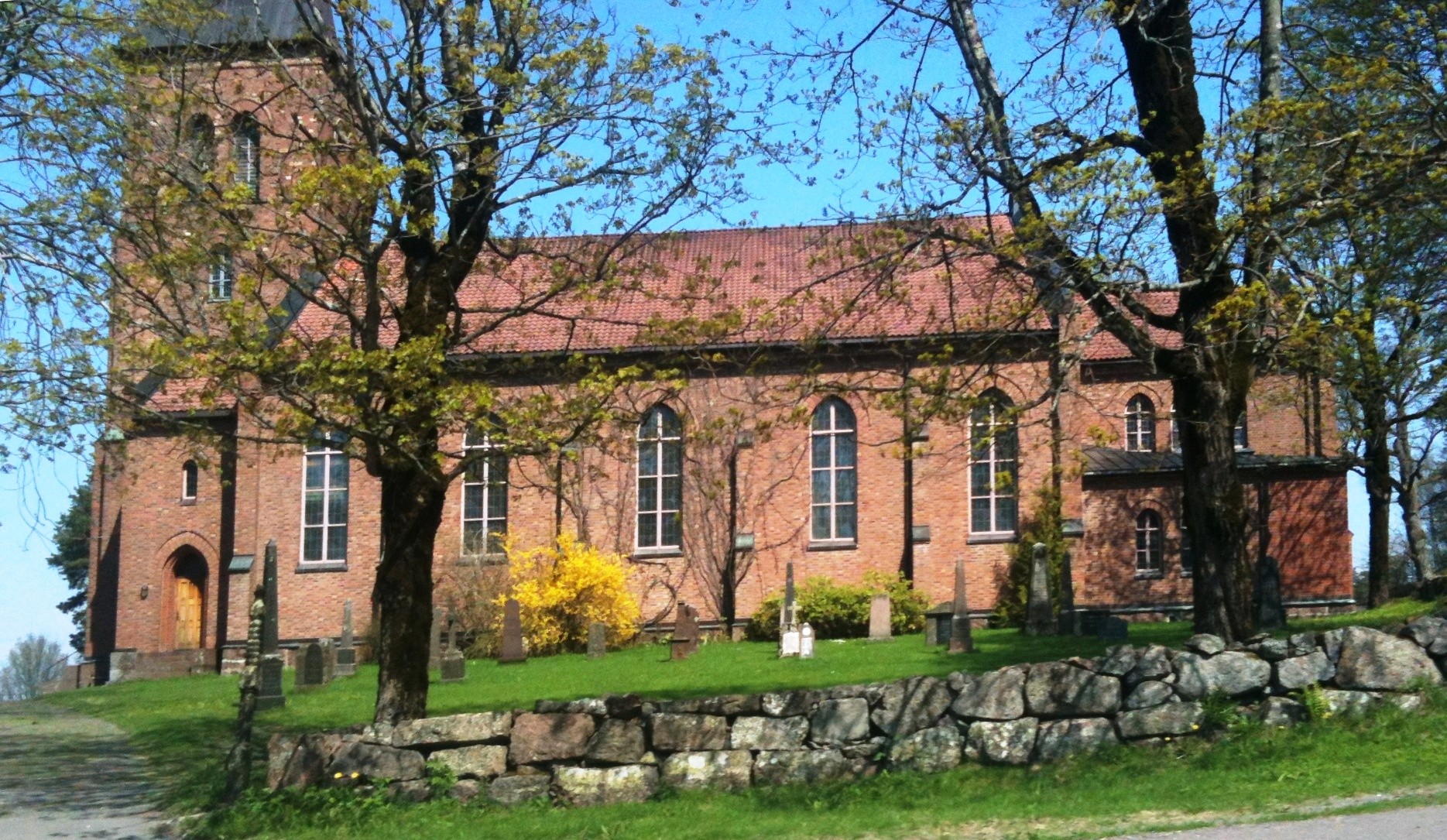
- View of the church
- Stokke Church
- 59°13′14″N 10°18′23″E
- Location: Sandefjord Municipality, Vestfold
- Country: Norway
- Denomination: Church of Norway
- Previous denomination: Catholic Church
- Churchmanship: Evangelical Lutheran

History
- Status: Parish church
- Founded: 12th century
- Consecrated: 24 Nov 1886

Architecture
- Functional status: Active
- Architect: J.W. Nordan
- Architectural type: Long church
- Completed: 1886 (140 years ago)

Specifications
- Capacity: 550
- Materials: Brick

Administration
- Diocese: Tunsberg
- Deanery: Sandefjord prosti
- Parish: Stokke
- Norwegian Cultural Heritage Site
- Type: Church
- Status: Listed
- ID: 85572

Stokke Church (Norwegian: Stokke kirke) is a parish church of the Church of Norway in Sandefjord Municipality in Vestfold county, Norway. It is located in the village of Stokke. It is the church for the Stokke parish which is part of the Sandefjord prosti (deanery) in the Diocese of Tunsberg. The brown brick church was built in a long church design in 1886 using plans drawn up by the architect Jacob Wilhelm Nordan. The church seats about 550 people.

== History ==
The earliest existing historical records of the church date back to the year 1329, but the church was not built that year. The first church in Stokke was a Romanesque stone church with a rectangular nave and a smaller rectangular chancel that was likely built during the 12th century. In 1673, the church became the property of the County of Jarlsberg. In 1883, the church was sold to the local villagers who then gave the church to the parish in 1884.

In 1885, the church was deemed to be too small for the parish, so it was torn down with the intention of building a new church on the same site. For the construction of the new church, Jacob Wilhelm Nordan's architectural drawings for Asker Church were used after making a few changes. The foundation stone was laid under the altar on 1 October 1885, and the new brick church was built under the direction of Carl G. Berg. The church was consecrated by Bishop Carl Peter Parelius Essendrop on 24 November 1886. It is a brick long church with a west tower with a church porch at the base of the tower, a rectangular nave, and a choir surrounded by vestries. The church was thoroughly restored externally and internally during the late 1960s.

== Media gallery ==
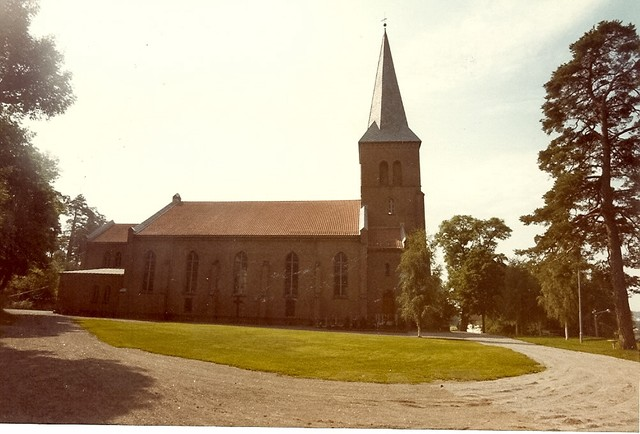

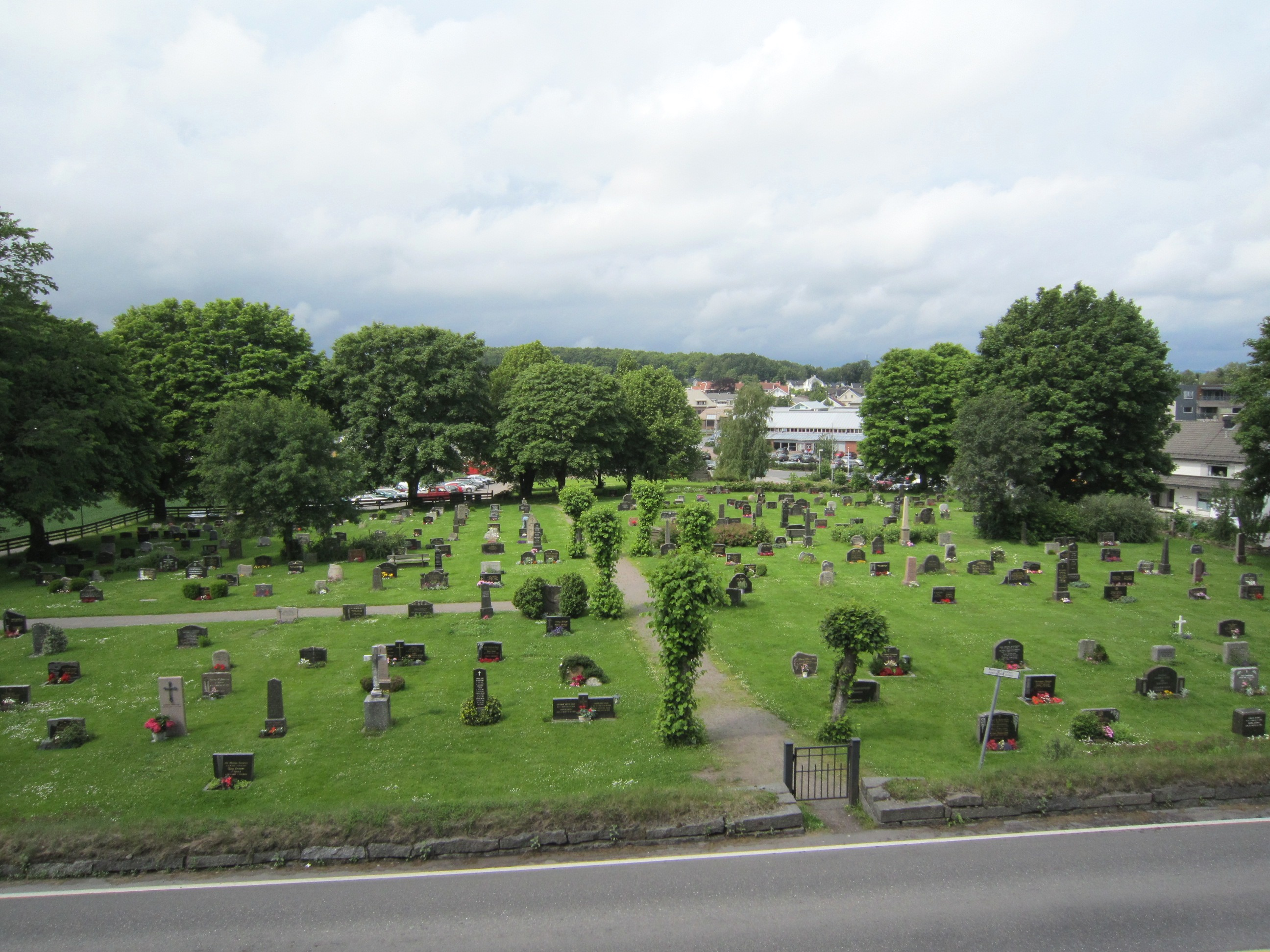

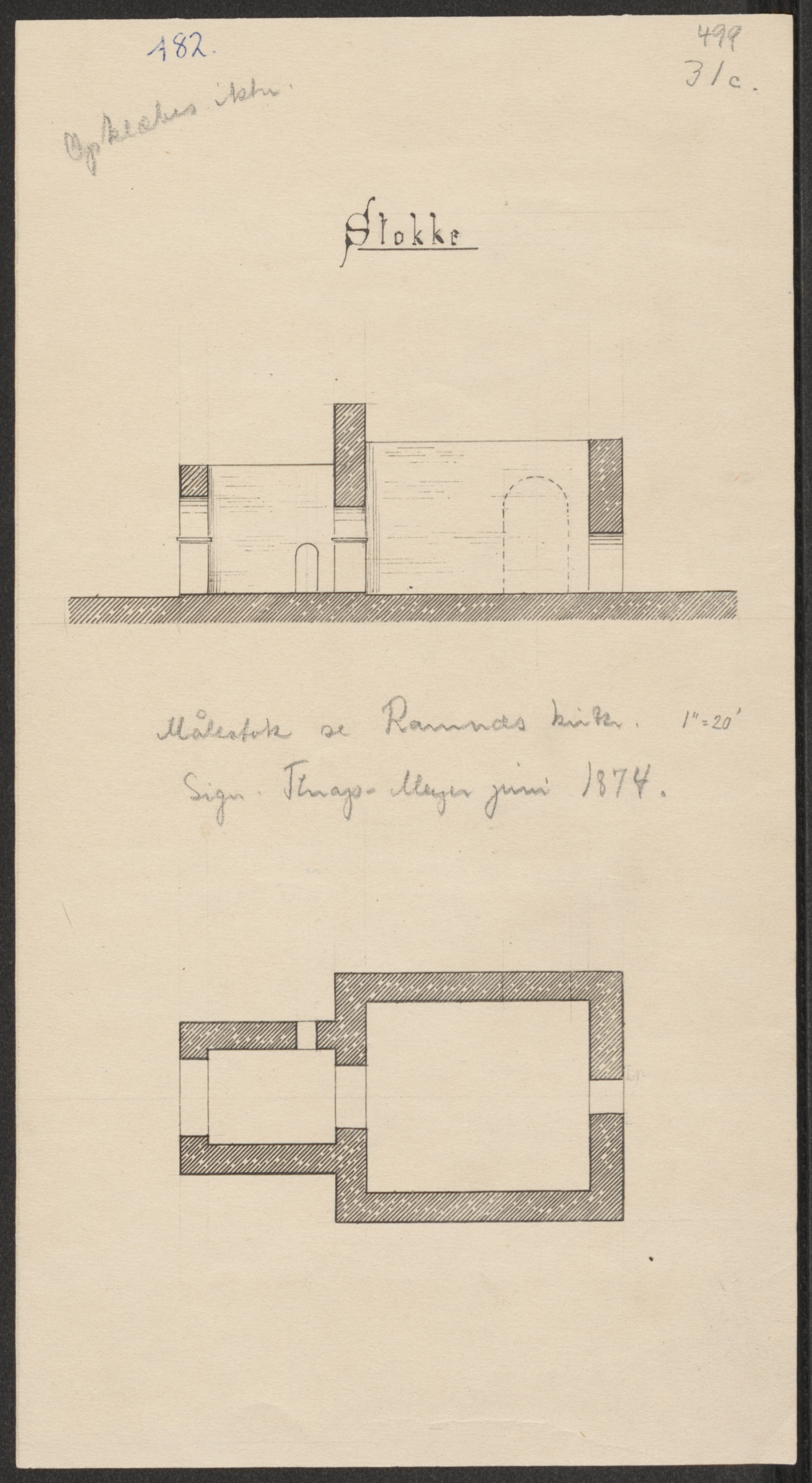

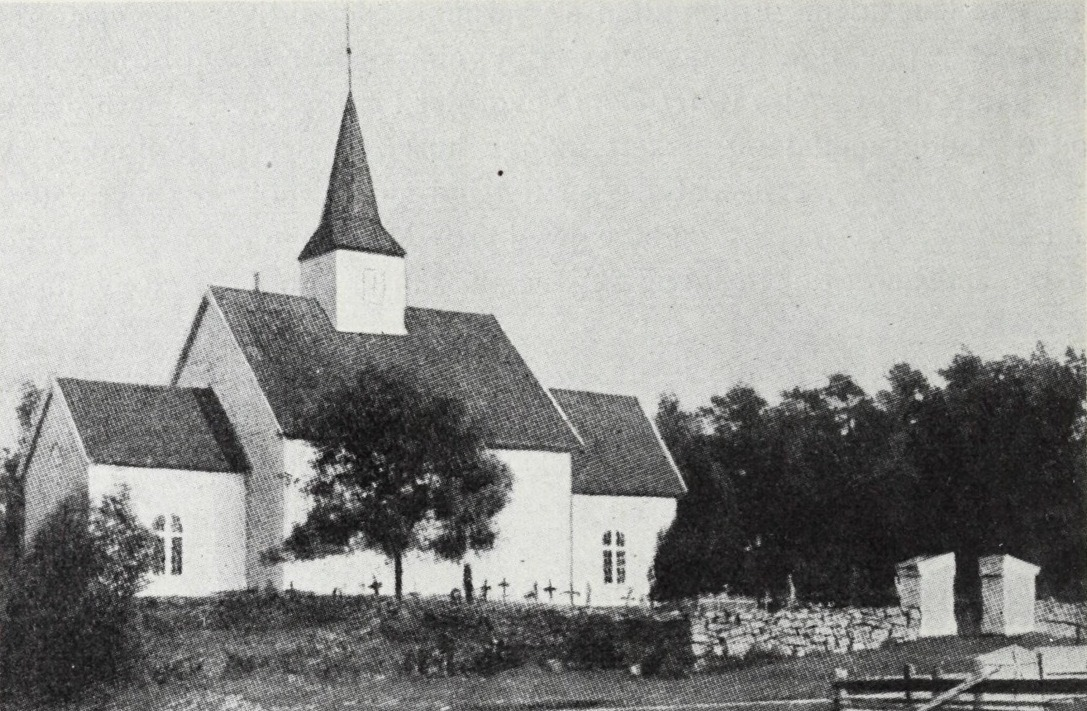

== See also ==
- List of churches in Tunsberg
