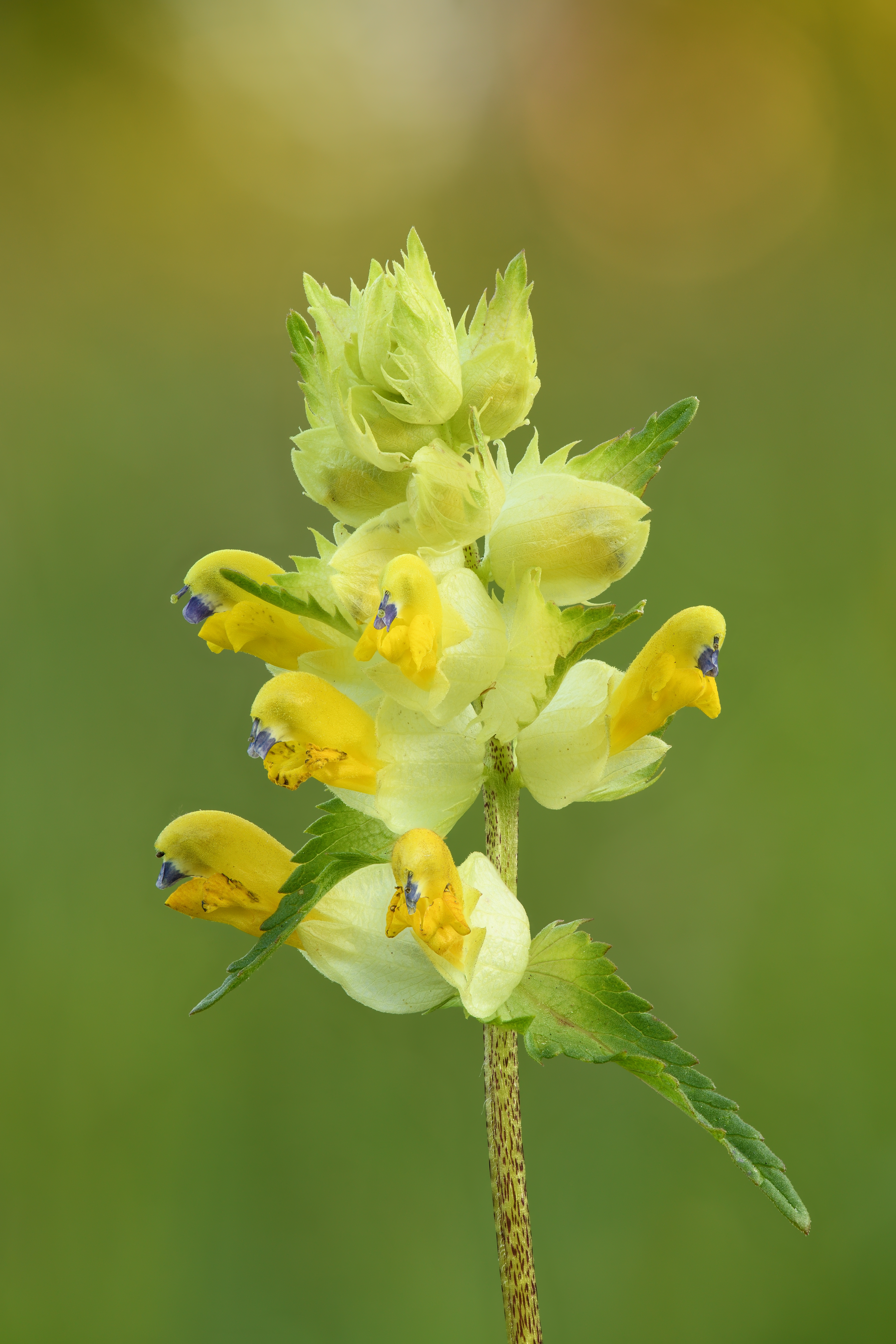

Scientific classification
- Kingdom: Plantae
- Clade: Embryophytes
- Clade: Tracheophytes
- Clade: Spermatophytes
- Clade: Angiosperms
- Clade: Eudicots
- Clade: Asterids
- Order: Lamiales
- Family: Orobanchaceae
- Genus: Rhinanthus
- Species: R. angustifolius

Binomial name
- Rhinanthus angustifolius C.C.Gmel.

= Rhinanthus angustifolius =

Species of flowering plant in the broomrape family

Rhinanthus angustifolius, the narrow-leaved rattle or greater yellow-rattle, is a plant species in the broomrape family, Orobanchaceae. It is an annual wildflower native to temperate grasslands in much of Europe, and north and central Western Asia. The yellow flowers are mostly visited by bumblebees.

== Distribution ==
Rhinanthus angustifolius has native distribution in:

Europe

- Northern Europe: Denmark; Finland; Norway; Sweden; Estonia; Latvia; Lithuania; United Kingdom, and the northwestern Russian Federation's European Northwestern Federal District oblasts and republics, including Karelia and Saint Petersburg-Leningrad Oblast.
- Middle Europe: Austria; Belgium; Czech Republic; Germany; Hungary; Netherlands; Poland; Slovakia; Switzerland.
- Southwestern Europe: France and northwestern Spain.
- East Europe: Belarus; Moldova; Ukraine; and the western Russian Federation's European Central Federal District and Volga Federal District oblasts and republics; including Kirov, Moscow-Moscow Oblast, Smolensk, and Tula
- Southeastern Europe: Bulgaria; Romania; Slovenia, North Macedonia, Croatia, and the other Balkans countries.

This annual root-parasite was formerly a widespread weed of arable land in east Britain. However, most of the remaining sites are on the North Downs, in grassland and open scrub on chalk. In Lincolnshire, it occurs on peat in an area of cleared Pteridium and on railway ballast. In Angus, a tiny colony survives in sandy coastal grassland.

Asia

- Western Asia: Turkey
- Caucasus:
  - Transcaucasus: in Armenia; Azerbaijan, and Georgia.
  - Ciscaucasia: in the Russian Federation's Eurasian North Caucasian Federal District oblasts and republics; including Chechnya, the Sochi region in Krasnodar Krai, and North Ossetia.
- Pontic–Caspian steppe: western Kazakhstan; the Russian Federation's central-western Asian Southern Federal District oblasts and republics; including Kalmykia Republic and Volgograd.
- West Siberian Plain: the Russian Federation's northwestern Asia region of the western Siberian Federal District; including the Oblasts of Chelyabinsk, Novosibirsk, and Omsk.

== Synonyms ==
- Alectorolophus major Rchb.,
- Alectorolophus glaber (Lam.) Beck
- Alectorolophus montanus (Saut.) Frits
- Rhinanthus apterus (R. angustifolius subsp. grandiflorus)
- Rhinanthus glaber Lam. (R. angustifolius subsp. angustifolius)
- Rhinanthus grandiflorus (Wallr.) Bluff & Fingerh. (R. angustifolius subsp. grandiflorus)
- Rhinanthus major
- Rhinanthus montanus Sauter (R. angustifolius subsp. angustifolius)
- Rhinanthus parviflorus Noulet (R. angustifolius subsp. angustifolius)
- Rhinanthus reichenbachii Bentham in DC. (R. angustifolius subsp. grandiflorus)
- Rhinanthus serotinus (Schönheit) Oborny (R. angustifolius subsp. angustifolius)
- Rhinanthus vernalis (Zinger) Schischk. & Sergueievkaja (R. angustifolius subsp. grandiflorus
- Rhinanthus × poeverleinii (R. angustifolius subsp. ? × glacialis)
