= Andebu Municipality =

Former municipality in Norway

Andebu Municipality Andebu kommune
- Former municipality
- Andebu herred (historic name)
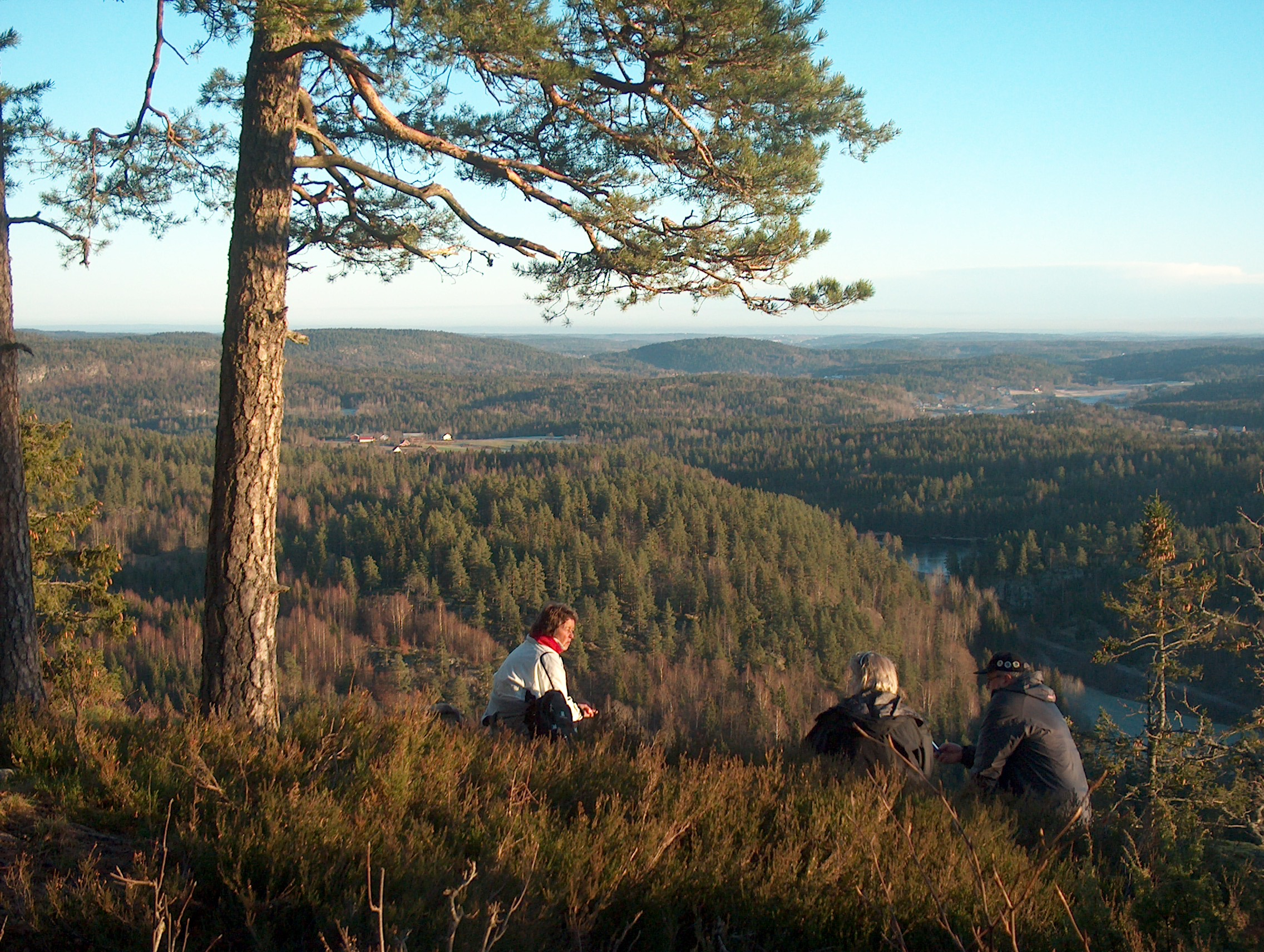
- View of the forests and lakes of Andebu seen from Dalaåsen. Credit: Gunnar Gallis

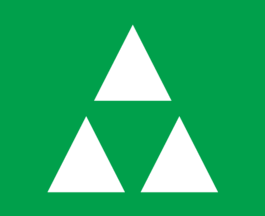
- Flag Coat of arms

- Vestfold within Norway

- Andebu within Vestfold
- Coordinates: 59°17′50″N 10°6′18″E
- Country: Norway
- County: Vestfold
- District: Vestfold
- Established: 1 Jan 1838
  - Created as: Formannskapsdistrikt
- Disestablished: 1 Jan 2017
  - Succeeded by: Sandefjord Municipality
- Administrative centre: Andebu

Government
  - Mayor (2012–2016): Bjarne Sommerstad (Sp)

Area (upon dissolution)
  - Total: 185.90 km^{2} (71.78 sq mi)
  - Land: 182.80 km^{2} (70.58 sq mi)
  - Water: 3.10 km^{2} (1.20 sq mi) 1.7%
  - Rank: #339 in Norway
- Highest elevation (Brånafjell): 399.34 m (1,310.2 ft)

Population (2016)
  - Total: 5,937
  - Rank: #179 in Norway
  - Density: 32.5/km^{2} (84/sq mi)
  - Change (10 years): ▲ +15.3%
- Demonym: Andebusokning

Official language
  - Norwegian form: Bokmål
- Time zone: UTC+01:00 (CET)
  - Summer (DST): UTC+02:00 (CEST)
- ISO 3166 code: NO-0719

Andebu (Norwegian pronunciation: [²anːəbʉ]; locally [²aːnbʉ]) is a former municipality in Vestfold county, Norway. The 185.9-square-kilometre (71.8 sq mi) municipality existed from 1838 until its dissolution in 2017. The area is now makes up the northern part of Sandefjord Municipality. The administrative centre was the village of Andebu. Other villages in Andebu included Høyjord and Kodal.

Andebu was the fourth-largest municipality in Vestfold county and it was situated in the center of the county. Prior to its dissolution in 2017, the 185.9-square-kilometre (71.8 sq mi) municipality was the 339th largest by area out of the 428 municipalities in Norway. Andebu Municipality was the 179th most populous municipality in Norway with a population of about 5,937. The municipality's population density was 32.5 inhabitants per square kilometre (84/sq mi) and its population had increased by 15.3% over the previous 10-year period.

Andebu's economy was primarily related to logging and forestry. Andebu has been inhabited for centuries and the oldest artifacts retrieved here dates back 4000 years to the Iron Age. Most retrieved artifacts are various types of tools, mainly axes made of flint and other rocks. Andebu’s geography consists mainly of valleys, hills, mountains, forests, and lakes.

== General information ==
=== Administrative history ===
The formannskapsdistrikt law of 1837 created a system of local government in Norway by establishing each town (ladested or kjøpstad) and each Church of Norway prestegjeld as a civil municipality. On 1 January 1838, Andebo prestegjeld was established as Andebo Municipality (later spelled Andebu). On 1 January 1878, an area of Hedrum Municipality (population: 61) was transferred to Andebu Municipality.

In 2017 to 2020, there were many municipal and county mergers across Norway due to the work of the Solberg cabinet. On 1 January 2017, Andebu Municipality was dissolved and the following areas were merged to form an enlarged Sandefjord Municipality:

- all of Andebu Municipality (population: 5,937)
- all of Sandefjord Municipality (population: 45,820)
- all of Stokke Municipality (population: 11,657)

=== Name ===
The municipality is named after the old Andebu prestegjeld. The prestegjeld was named after the old Andebu farm (Old Norse: Andabú) since the first Andebu Church was built there. The meaning of the first element is unknown, but one possibility is that it comes from the old male name Andi, but this is not certain. The last element comes from the word bú which means "dwelling" or "farm". Prior to 1889, the name was spelled "Andebo".

=== Coat of arms ===
The coat of arms was granted on 12 December 1986. The official blazon is "Vert, three triangles argent, one over two" (Norwegian: I grønt tre sølv triangler, 1-2). This means the arms have a green field (background) and the charge is a set of three equilateral triangles with one over two. The charge has a tincture of argent which means it is commonly colored white, but if it is made out of metal, then silver is used. The green color in the field symbolizes the importance of agriculture and forestry. The three triangles were chosen to symbolize the three villages/parishes in the municipality: Andebu, Høyjord, and Kodal. The three triangles also are set up to look like the letter A, the first letter of the municipal name. The arms were designed by Kjell Skoli. The municipal flag had the same design as the coat of arms.

=== Churches ===
The Church of Norway had three parishes (sokn) within Andebu Municipality. It was part of the Sandefjord prosti (deanery) in the Diocese of Tunsberg.

Churches in Andebu Municipality
Parish (sokn)	Church name	Location of the church	Year built
Andebu	Andebu Church	Andebu	c. 1100
Høyjord	Høyjord Stave Church	Høyjord	c. 1100
Kodal	Kodal Church	Kodal	c. 1100

Andebu Church was the main church for the municipality. It was built around the year 1100. It is a stone church with seating for 300. The soapstone baptismal font is from the 1100s. The altarpiece and the pulpit are in Renaissance style and date from about 1650. The church was extensively restored in 1686. The church is home to Norway's oldest existing written parish register from 1623. The ridge turret was destroyed in a storm in 1701 and had to be rebuilt.

The Høyjord Stave Church was also located in Andebu and it is the only stave church in Vestfold County.

== History ==
Various historical artifacts and burial mounds dated to the Viking Age have been discovered in Andebu. Finds include a bronze key, a stone axe, arrows, and more. Burial mounds have been discovered on approximately 30 farms in Andebu Municipality, including 17 in the village of Andebu, 5 in Høyjord, and 7 in Kodal. Some mounds are dated back as far as 500 BCE (in other words, over a thousand years prior to the Viking Age). Large amounts of burial mounds are found at Nordre Haugan, Nedre Skjelland, Våle, Vestre Høyjord, Bjørndal, and Gjerstad.

The 14th century Black Plague had a devastating impact on the population of Andebu. It is estimated that the population was 600 as of 1600 A.D., approximately the same amount as prior to the plague, meaning that it took about 200 years to regain the lost population for the area.

Andebu Municipality was established on 1 January 1838, with priest Jens H. Otterbeck as its first mayor. Otterbeck served as mayor for 24 years and was the longest-serving mayor of Andebu Municipality.

== Government ==
While it existed, Andebu Municipality was responsible for primary education (through 10th grade), outpatient health services, senior citizen services, welfare and other social services, zoning, economic development, and municipal roads and utilities. The municipality was governed by a municipal council of directly elected representatives. The mayor was indirectly elected by a vote of the municipal council. The municipality was under the jurisdiction of the Tønsberg District Court and the Agder Court of Appeal.

=== Municipal council ===
The municipal council (Kommunestyre) of Andebu Municipality was made up of 25 representatives that were elected to four year terms. The tables below show the historical composition of the council by political party.

Andebu kommunestyre 2015–2016
Party name (in Norwegian)	Number of representatives
Labour Party (Arbeiderpartiet)	8
Progress Party (Fremskrittspartiet)	3
Conservative Party (Høyre)	5
Christian Democratic Party (Kristelig Folkeparti)	1
Centre Party (Senterpartiet)	6
Liberal Party (Venstre)	2
Total number of members:	25
Note: On 1 January 2017, Andebu Municipality became part of Sandefjord Municipality.

Andebu kommunestyre 2011–2015
Party name (in Norwegian)	Number of representatives
Labour Party (Arbeiderpartiet)	7
Progress Party (Fremskrittspartiet)	4
Conservative Party (Høyre)	6
Christian Democratic Party (Kristelig Folkeparti)	2
Centre Party (Senterpartiet)	4
Liberal Party (Venstre)	2
Total number of members:	25

Andebu kommunestyre 2007–2011
Party name (in Norwegian)	Number of representatives
Labour Party (Arbeiderpartiet)	5
Progress Party (Fremskrittspartiet)	5
Conservative Party (Høyre)	3
Christian Democratic Party (Kristelig Folkeparti)	4
Centre Party (Senterpartiet)	3
Socialist Left Party (Sosialistisk Venstreparti)	2
Liberal Party (Venstre)	3
Total number of members:	25

Andebu kommunestyre 2003–2007
Party name (in Norwegian)	Number of representatives
Labour Party (Arbeiderpartiet)	4
Progress Party (Fremskrittspartiet)	5
Conservative Party (Høyre)	4
Christian Democratic Party (Kristelig Folkeparti)	3
Centre Party (Senterpartiet)	3
Socialist Left Party (Sosialistisk Venstreparti)	3
Liberal Party (Venstre)	3
Total number of members:	25

Andebu kommunestyre 1999–2003
Party name (in Norwegian)	Number of representatives
Labour Party (Arbeiderpartiet)	6
Progress Party (Fremskrittspartiet)	3
Conservative Party (Høyre)	5
Christian Democratic Party (Kristelig Folkeparti)	3
Red Electoral Alliance (Rød Valgallianse)	1
Centre Party (Senterpartiet)	5
Liberal Party (Venstre)	2
Total number of members:	25

Andebu kommunestyre 1995–1999
Party name (in Norwegian)	Number of representatives
Labour Party (Arbeiderpartiet)	6
Conservative Party (Høyre)	6
Christian Democratic Party (Kristelig Folkeparti)	2
Red Electoral Alliance (Rød Valgallianse)	1
Centre Party (Senterpartiet)	9
Liberal Party (Venstre)	1
Total number of members:	25

Andebu kommunestyre 1991–1995
Party name (in Norwegian)	Number of representatives
Labour Party (Arbeiderpartiet)	7
Progress Party (Fremskrittspartiet)	2
Conservative Party (Høyre)	7
Centre Party (Senterpartiet)	7
Liberal Party (Venstre)	2
Total number of members:	25

Andebu kommunestyre 1987–1991
Party name (in Norwegian)	Number of representatives
Labour Party (Arbeiderpartiet)	8
Progress Party (Fremskrittspartiet)	3
Conservative Party (Høyre)	7
Christian Democratic Party (Kristelig Folkeparti)	2
Centre Party (Senterpartiet)	3
Liberal Party (Venstre)	2
Total number of members:	25

Andebu kommunestyre 1983–1987
Party name (in Norwegian)	Number of representatives
Labour Party (Arbeiderpartiet)	7
Progress Party (Fremskrittspartiet)	3
Conservative Party (Høyre)	8
Christian Democratic Party (Kristelig Folkeparti)	2
Centre Party (Senterpartiet)	3
Liberal Party (Venstre)	2
Total number of members:	25

Andebu kommunestyre 1979–1983
Party name (in Norwegian)	Number of representatives
Labour Party (Arbeiderpartiet)	7
Conservative Party (Høyre)	9
Christian Democratic Party (Kristelig Folkeparti)	2
Centre Party (Senterpartiet)	4
Liberal Party (Venstre)	3
Total number of members:	25

Andebu kommunestyre 1975–1979
Party name (in Norwegian)	Number of representatives
Labour Party (Arbeiderpartiet)	8
Conservative Party (Høyre)	7
Christian Democratic Party (Kristelig Folkeparti)	3
Centre Party (Senterpartiet)	5
Liberal Party (Venstre)	2
Total number of members:	25

Andebu kommunestyre 1971–1975
Party name (in Norwegian)	Number of representatives
Labour Party (Arbeiderpartiet)	9
Conservative Party (Høyre)	6
Christian Democratic Party (Kristelig Folkeparti)	2
Centre Party (Senterpartiet)	5
Liberal Party (Venstre)	3
Total number of members:	25

Andebu kommunestyre 1967–1971
Party name (in Norwegian)	Number of representatives
Labour Party (Arbeiderpartiet)	9
Conservative Party (Høyre)	6
Christian Democratic Party (Kristelig Folkeparti)	2
Centre Party (Senterpartiet)	5
Liberal Party (Venstre)	3
Total number of members:	25

Andebu kommunestyre 1963–1967
Party name (in Norwegian)	Number of representatives
Labour Party (Arbeiderpartiet)	9
Conservative Party (Høyre)	7
Christian Democratic Party (Kristelig Folkeparti)	1
Centre Party (Senterpartiet)	5
Liberal Party (Venstre)	3
Total number of members:	25

Andebu herredsstyre 1959–1963
Party name (in Norwegian)	Number of representatives
Labour Party (Arbeiderpartiet)	8
Conservative Party (Høyre)	6
Christian Democratic Party (Kristelig Folkeparti)	2
Centre Party (Senterpartiet)	5
Liberal Party (Venstre)	4
Total number of members:	25

Andebu herredsstyre 1955–1959
Party name (in Norwegian)	Number of representatives
Labour Party (Arbeiderpartiet)	7
Conservative Party (Høyre)	6
Christian Democratic Party (Kristelig Folkeparti)	1
Farmers' Party (Bondepartiet)	6
Liberal Party (Venstre)	5
Total number of members:	25

Andebu herredsstyre 1951–1955
Party name (in Norwegian)	Number of representatives
Labour Party (Arbeiderpartiet)	7
Conservative Party (Høyre)	7
Farmers' Party (Bondepartiet)	5
Liberal Party (Venstre)	5
Total number of members:	24

Andebu herredsstyre 1947–1951
Party name (in Norwegian)	Number of representatives
Labour Party (Arbeiderpartiet)	6
Conservative Party (Høyre)	6
Farmers' Party (Bondepartiet)	5
Joint list of the Liberal Party (Venstre) and the Radical People's Party (Radikale Folkepartiet)	7
Total number of members:	24

Andebu herredsstyre 1945–1947
Party name (in Norwegian)	Number of representatives
Labour Party (Arbeiderpartiet)	6
Conservative Party (Høyre)	5
Farmers' Party (Bondepartiet)	3
Joint list of the Liberal Party (Venstre) and the Radical People's Party (Radikale Folkepartiet)	7
Joint List(s) of Non-Socialist Parties (Borgerlige Felleslister)	3
Total number of members:	24

Andebu herredsstyre 1937–1941*
Party name (in Norwegian)	Number of representatives
Labour Party (Arbeiderpartiet)	4
Conservative Party (Høyre)	1
Farmers' Party (Bondepartiet)	5
Liberal Party (Venstre)	8
Joint List(s) of Non-Socialist Parties (Borgerlige Felleslister)	6
Total number of members:	24
Note: Due to the German occupation of Norway during World War II, no elections were held for new municipal councils until after the war ended in 1945.

=== Mayors ===
The mayor (Norwegian: ordfører) of Andebu Municipality was the political leader of the municipality and the chairperson of the municipal council. The following people have held this position:

- 1838–1862: Jens H. Otterbech
- 1863–1863: Gullik Chr. Herre-Skjelbred
- 1864–1865: Johan G. Gran
- 1866–1867: Gullik Chr. Herre-Skjelbred
- 1868–1869: Johan G. Gran
- 1870–1873: Abraham Chr. Wegger
- 1874–1877: Peder K. Nilsen
- 1878–1880: Johan G. Gran
- 1881–1881: Karl Nilsen
- 1882–1889: Abraham Chr. Wegger
- 1890–1897: Anton Bjørndal
- 1898–1898: Edvard A. Hallenstvedt
- 1899–1901: A. Ljosnæs
- 1902–1905: Anton Bjørndal
- 1905–1913: A. Ljosnæs
- 1914–1916: Abraham Andersen Tolsrød
- 1917–1922: Anders Flaatten
- 1923–1927: O. Bakkeland
- 1928–1930: Anders Flaatten
- 1931–1939: Hans R. Trevland
- 1939–1941: Ole Bergan
- 1945–1945: Ole Bergan
- 1946–1955: O. Strandskog
- 1956–1959: Ole Bergan
- 1960–1961: Johan Gran
- 1962–1963: Ivar Bjørndal
- 1964–1965: Johan Gran
- 1966–1967: Ole Bergan
- 1968–1975: Thor Wrangsund
- 1976–1981: Paul Kristian Berg
- 1982–1985: Ingolf Wegger
- 1986–1991: Jan Vestby
- 1992–1999: Rolf Fevang
- 1999–2011: Hans Hilding Hønsvall (KrF)
- 2012–2016: Bjarne Sommerstad (Sp)

== Geography ==
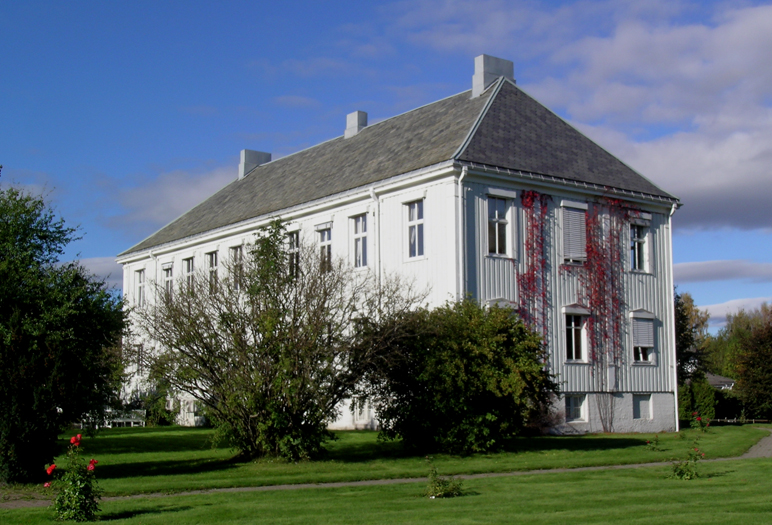
Town Hall.

Andebu Municipality was located in the interior central parts of Vestfold County. Most of the municipality was forested, but numerous rivers and mountains were also found in Andebu. Rivers included Merkedamselva, which flowed through eastern parts of the village of Høyjord. Steinselva (Skorgeelva), Bergselva, and Bølevannsbekken were other rivers in Andebu. The municipality of Andebu was home to 35 lakes, including the 0.37-square-kilometre (91-acre) Askjemvannet, which was the largest lake in Andebu. Parts of the lake Goksjø were also located in Andebu, while minor lakes included Ilestadvannet, Åletjønn, Stålerødvannet, Heievannet, and others. Nature preserves in Andebu included Veggemyra (marsh), Nordre Skarsholttjønn (marsh), Dalaåsen (birch forest), and Flisefyr-Hidalen (forest).

The highest point in the municipality was the 399.34-metre (1,310.2 ft) tall mountain Brånafjell in the northern part of the municipality, northwest of Høyjord. Other notable peaks included Åletjønnåsen and Storås. Smaller peaks included Bustingen, Skørsåsane, and Storås by Skjeau. Parking for mountain hiking trails can be found by Trollsvann.

Re Municipality was located to the north, Stokke Municipality was located to the east, Sandefjord Municipality was located to the south, Larvik Municipality was located to the southwest, and Lardal Municipality was located to the northwest.

== Attractions ==
=== Recreation ===
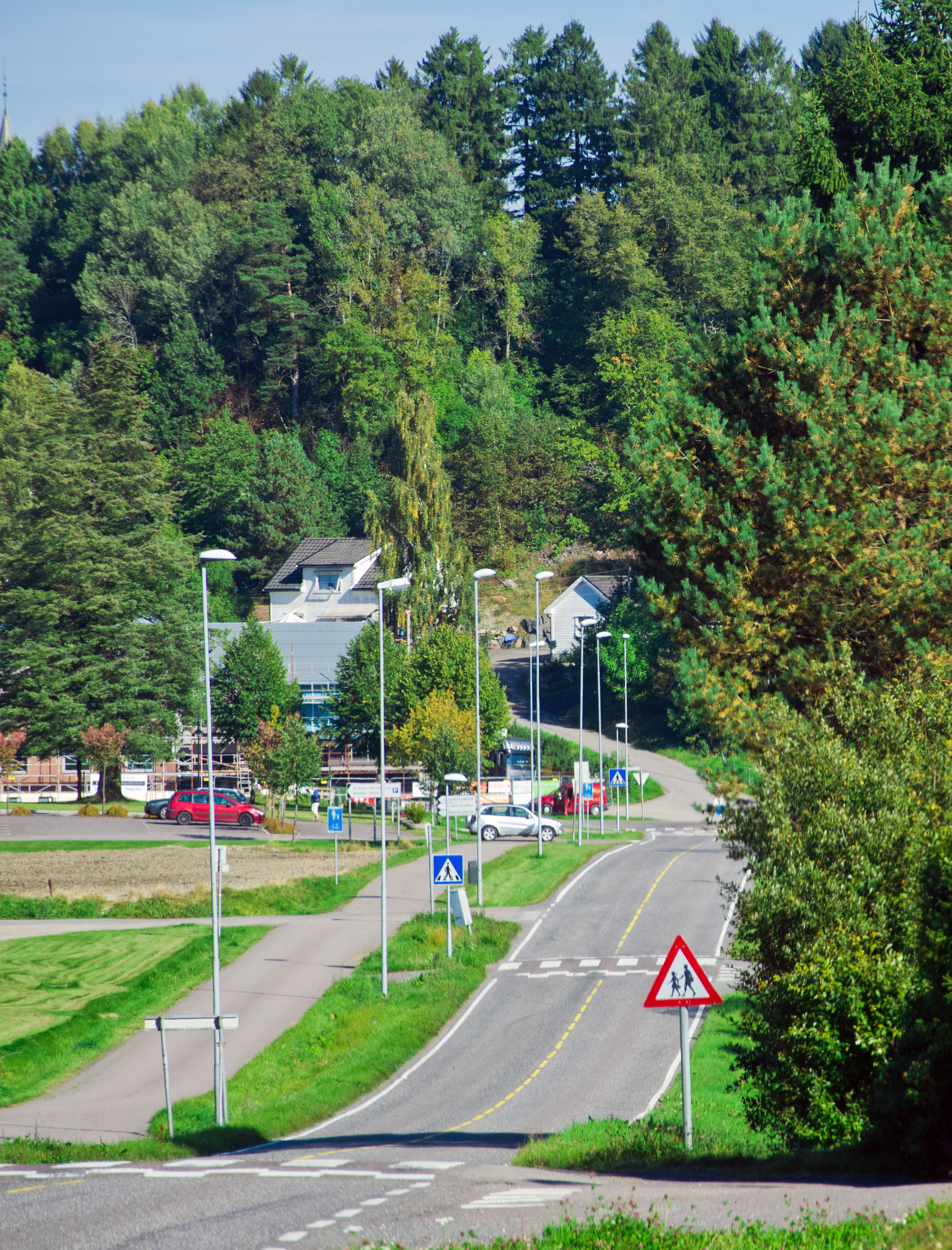
Kodalveien in the centre of Andebu village.

Heisetra is a cabin owned by Sandefjord Tourist Association which lies by the lake Heivannet and the river Svartåa. There are 100 kilometres (62 mi) of marked hiking trails are located near the cabin. The trails are used by cross-country skiers, bicyclists, hikers, and equestrians. Heisetra is situated in western Andebu near the border to the municipality of Larvik. A nature trail with interactive signs detailing local nature is located near the lake Heivannet. The lake is used for paddling, kayaking, swimming, and fishing. Nearby trails are used for hiking, skiing, mountain biking, horseback riding, and collection of mushrooms and berries. The 100-kilometre (62 mi) trail network from the cabin leads as far as Hardangervidda, while shorter trails include those leading to Grevesteinen and Sliradammen. The 9.7-kilometre (6.0 mi) Svartåa culture trail was previously used for the movement of logs to Larvik. This trail has various interactive signs describing the river’s cultural and historical significance, including signs near the Hansekanal, a canal created by Hans Anders Dahl in 1950.

Andebu Municipality was home to numerous gravel trails, for instance located by Snappen, Trolldalen, and Vidaråsen. Parking for Snappen could be found nearby Heisetra cabin, along with a variety of other forest- and mountain hikes. It could be reached by driving to Pipenholt, which lies along county road 210 between Kodal and Åsrum in Larvik Municipality. From Pipenholt, drive towards Hvitstein. Heiaveien goes through an agricultural landscape and passes by Geirastadir.

Andebu's highest mountain, Brånafjell was located in northernmost Andebu. The trail to the mountain could be found by Trollsvann Lake. Trollsvann was located on the border with Lardal Municipality and was surrounded by tall hillsides. A trail, Trollstien, followed the lake on its western side. A number of trailheads could be found near the cabin Trollsvannstua, a cabin owned by the Norwegian Trekking Association. Trails from Trollsvannstua led as far as to Merkedammen Lake in Re Municipality and westwards to Åletjønn Lake. There were also trails leading to the waterfall Løkedalsfossen in Lardal Municipality.

Another mountain trail leds to the peak and tower at Vetan, a 1.5 kilometres (0.93 mi) hike from the village of Andebu. From the village centre, one could follow Kodalveien to Familiesenteret. From there, make a right and follow the gravel Møylandsveien over the farm fields. Before the farm, the trail winds left into the woodlands. Interpretive signs can be found throughout the trail, which describe the area's species of wildlife and flora. The peak has an elevation of 180 metres (590 ft) and the house on top was originally a lookout tower meant to be used in times of war. An overlook tower was constructed at Vetan in 1988, which provides panoramic views of Tønsberg Fortress, the Oslo Fjord, Gaustatoppen, and Skrim. Parking for the trail to Vetan is located by the Møyland kindergarten, immediately west of the centre of the village of Andebu.

Andebu Municipality was home to 35 lakes, where fishing is permitted in 16 lakes. The largest rivers are Svartåa and Skorgeelva.

=== Points of interest ===
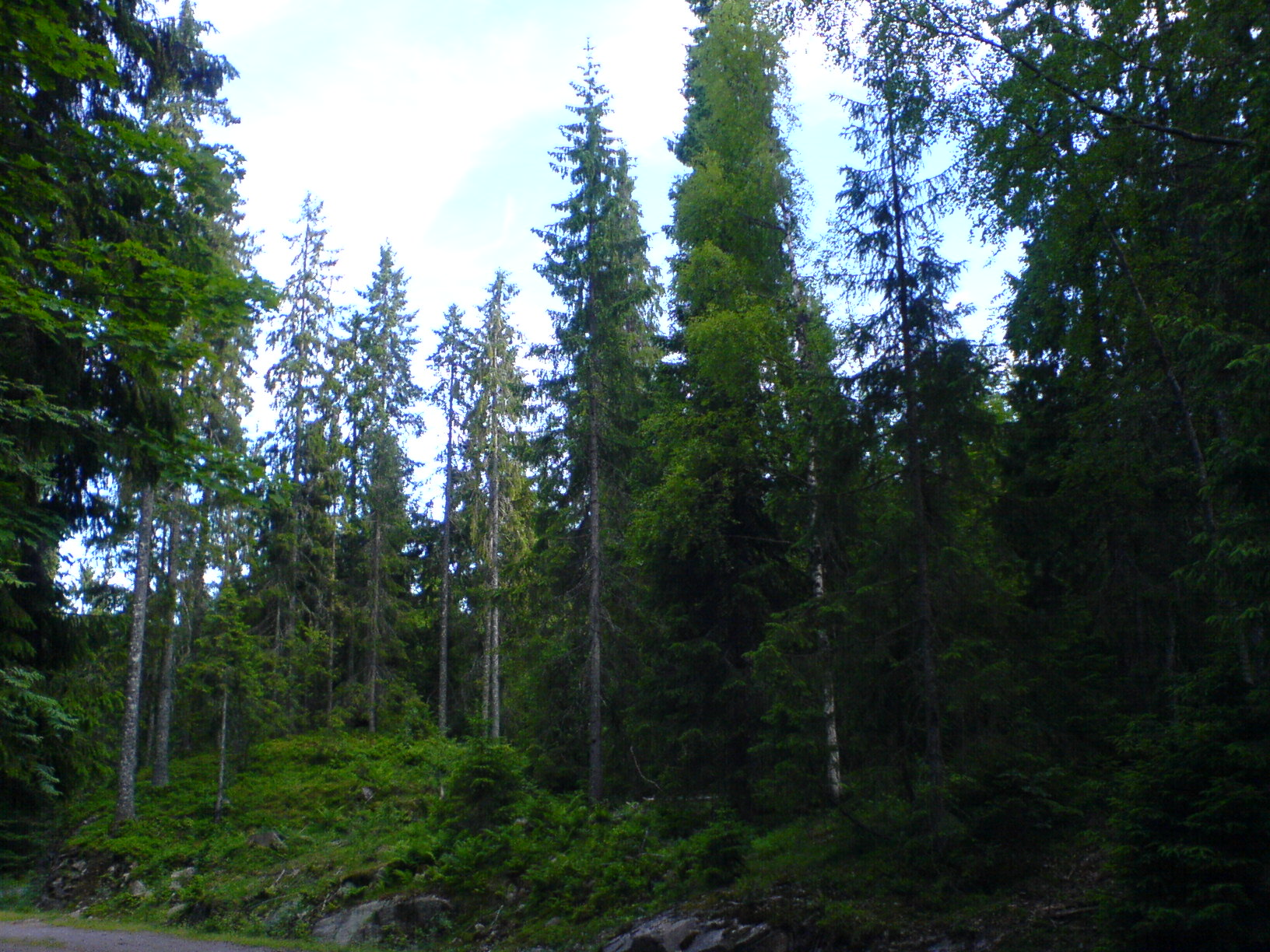
Norway spruce forest in Andebu.

- Høyjord Stave Church, the only remaining stave church in Vestfold County
- Heisetra, a cabin owned by Sandefjord Tourist Association, adjacent to 100 kilometres (62 mi) of hiking trails
- Andebu Church, the largest medieval church in Sandefjord municipality
- Goksjø Lake, the third-largest lake in Vestfold County
- Svartåa River, one of Andebu's largest rivers, popular fishing river
- Brånafjell, the tallest mountain in Sandefjord municipality

== Notable people ==
- Kaare Reitan (1903–2000), an orthodontist

== See also ==
- List of former municipalities of Norway
