= Andebu =

Andebu may refer to:

== Places ==
- Andebu Municipality, a former municipality in Vestfold county, Norway
- Andebu (village), a village in Sandefjord municipality in Vestfold county, Norway
- Andebu Church, a medieval church in Sandefjord municipality in Vestfold county, Norway
- Andebu prestegjeld, a former geographic subdivision of the Church of Norway in Vestfold county

== Other ==
- ANDEBU, the abbreviation for the Asociación Nacional de Broadcasters Uruguayos, a Uruguayan trade group
