= Høyjord =

Village in Sandefjord Municipality, Norway

- Village
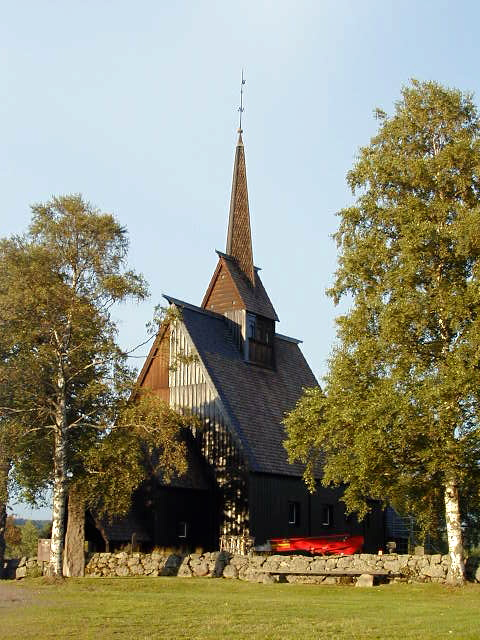
- View of the village church
- Interactive map of Høyjord
- Coordinates: 59.36667°N 10.11667°E
- Country: Norway
- Region: Eastern Norway
- County: Vestfold
- Municipality: Sandefjord Municipality

Area
  - Total: 0.64 km^{2} (0.25 sq mi)
- Elevation: 103 m (338 ft)

Population (2026)
  - Total: 597
  - Density: 933/km^{2} (2,420/sq mi)
- Time zone: UTC+01:00 (CET)
  - Summer (DST): UTC+02:00 (CEST)
- Post Code: 3158 Andebu

Høyjord is a village in Sandefjord Municipality in Vestfold county, Norway. The village is located about 8 kilometres (5.0 mi) to the northwest of the village of Andebu and about 10 kilometres (6.2 mi) to the west of the village of Revetal.

The 0.64-square-kilometre (160-acre) village has a population (2026) of 597 and a population density of 933 inhabitants per square kilometre (2,420/sq mi).

The village is most notable for the Høyjord Stave Church which is located at the north end of the village. The medieval stave church in Høyjord is the only stave church in Vestfold county and it is one of three remaining center post churches (midtmastkirke) in Norway. The stave church is commonly dated to around the year 1300, however, parts of the church were constructed in the 1100s and in 1275. The village of Høyjord is also home to an elementary school, kindergarten, and various sports and youth organizations. The nearby lake Illestadvannet is used for recreation and swimming.

== History ==
Høyjord was historically part of the old Andebu Municipality which existed until 1 January 2017 when it became part of Sandefjord Municipality. Leading up to the merger, some Høyjord residents wanted the village transferred to the neighbouring Re Municipality, but ultimately it became part of Sandefjord Municipality.

=== Name ===
The village is named after the old Høyjord farm (Old Norse: Haugagerði) since the old Høyjord Stave Church was built there. The first element comes from the plural genitive case of the word haugr which means "cairn" or "burial mound". The last element is gerði which means "fenced field". Thus it means something like "a fenced-in land of several burial mounds." Høyjord, locally pronounced "Høyjol". The spelling of the name has changed over the centuries. It was previously written Haughagiaurdi (in 1374), Haughagiorde (1400), Haagiord and Haajord (1593), and later Høijord and Høyjord.
