= Hans Hilding Hønsvall =

Norwegian politician (born 1952)

Mayor of Andebu Municipality
- In office 1999–2011

Deputy Member of the Storting
- In office 2001–2005
- Constituency: Vestfold

Personal details
- Born: 29 February 1952 (age 74)
- Party: Christian Democratic Party

Hans Hilding Hønsvall (born 29 February 1952) is a Norwegian politician for the Christian Democratic Party.

He served as a deputy representative to the Norwegian Parliament from Vestfold during the term 2001–2005, and again as a deputy representative for 2013–2017.

On the local level, Hønsvall was the mayor of Andebu Municipality from 1999 until 2011. Andebu Municipality was merged into Sandefjord Municipality on 1 January 2017 and is no longer an independent municipality.

In 2011, he was elected to the Vestfold county council and served as deputy county mayor (fylkesvaraordfører) for the 2011–2015 term. From 2015, he served as leader of the county main committee for transport and land use (hovedutvalg for samferdsel og areal) for the Vestfold County Municipality.
