= Goksjø =

Lake in Vestfold, Norway

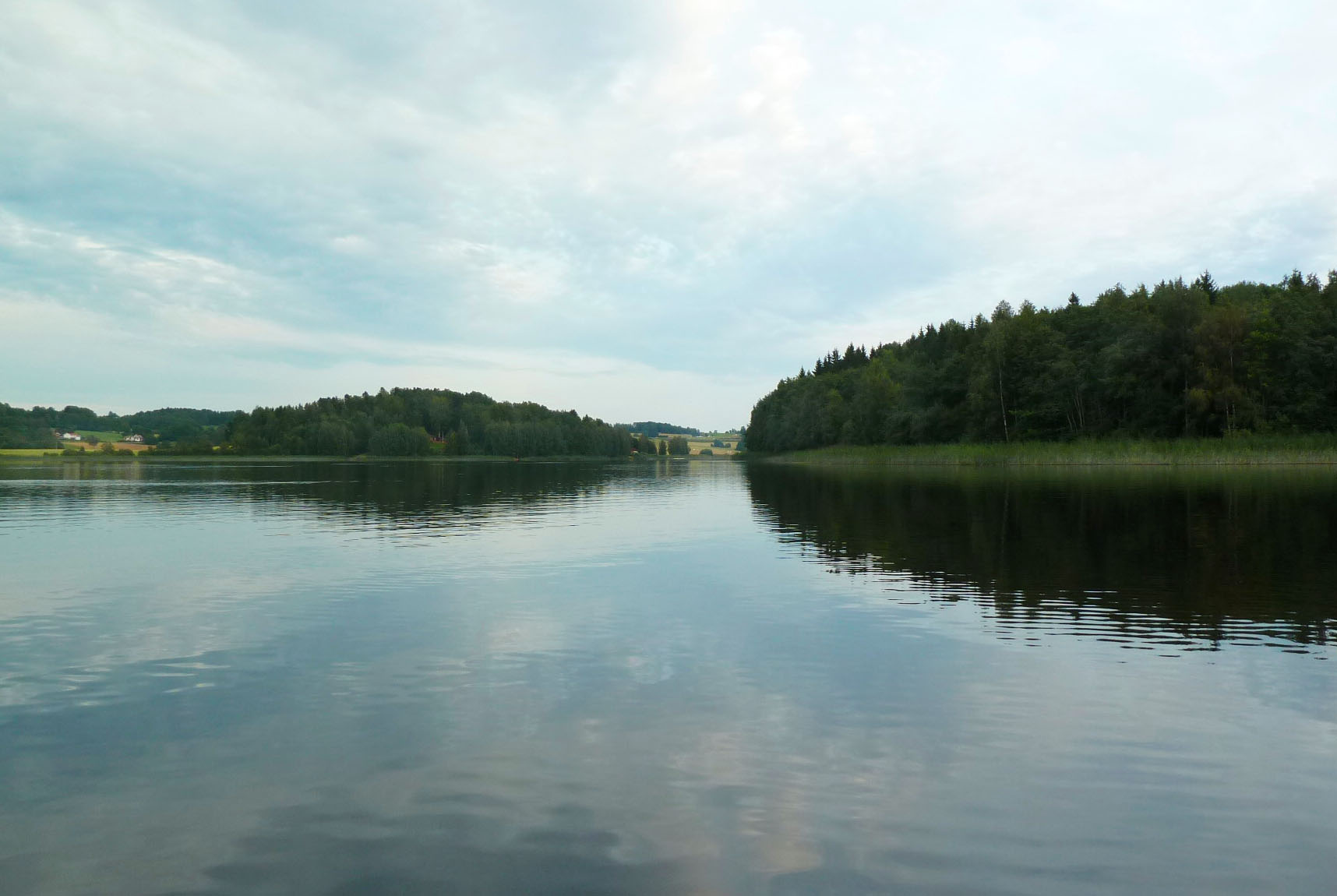
- Interactive map of Goksjø
- Location: Vestfold county
- Coordinates: 59.17488°N 10.1409°E
- Primary inflows: Storelv, Skorgeelva (Trollsåselva)
- Primary outflows: Hagneselva
- Basin countries: Norway
- Max. length: 5 kilometres (3.1 mi)
- Max. width: 0.75 kilometres (0.47 mi)
- Surface area: 3.47 km^{2} (1.34 sq mi)
- Max. depth: 26 metres (85 ft)
- Shore length^{1}: 21 kilometres (13 mi)
- Surface elevation: 28 metres (92 ft)
- References: NVE
- ^{1} Shore length is not a well-defined measure.

Goksjø is a lake on the border of Larvik Municipality and Sandefjord Municipality in Vestfold county, Norway. The 3.5-square-kilometre (1.4 sq mi) lake is located about 5 kilometres (3.1 mi) to the northwest of the town of Sandefjord and about 2.5 kilometres (1.6 mi) to the south of the village of Kodal.

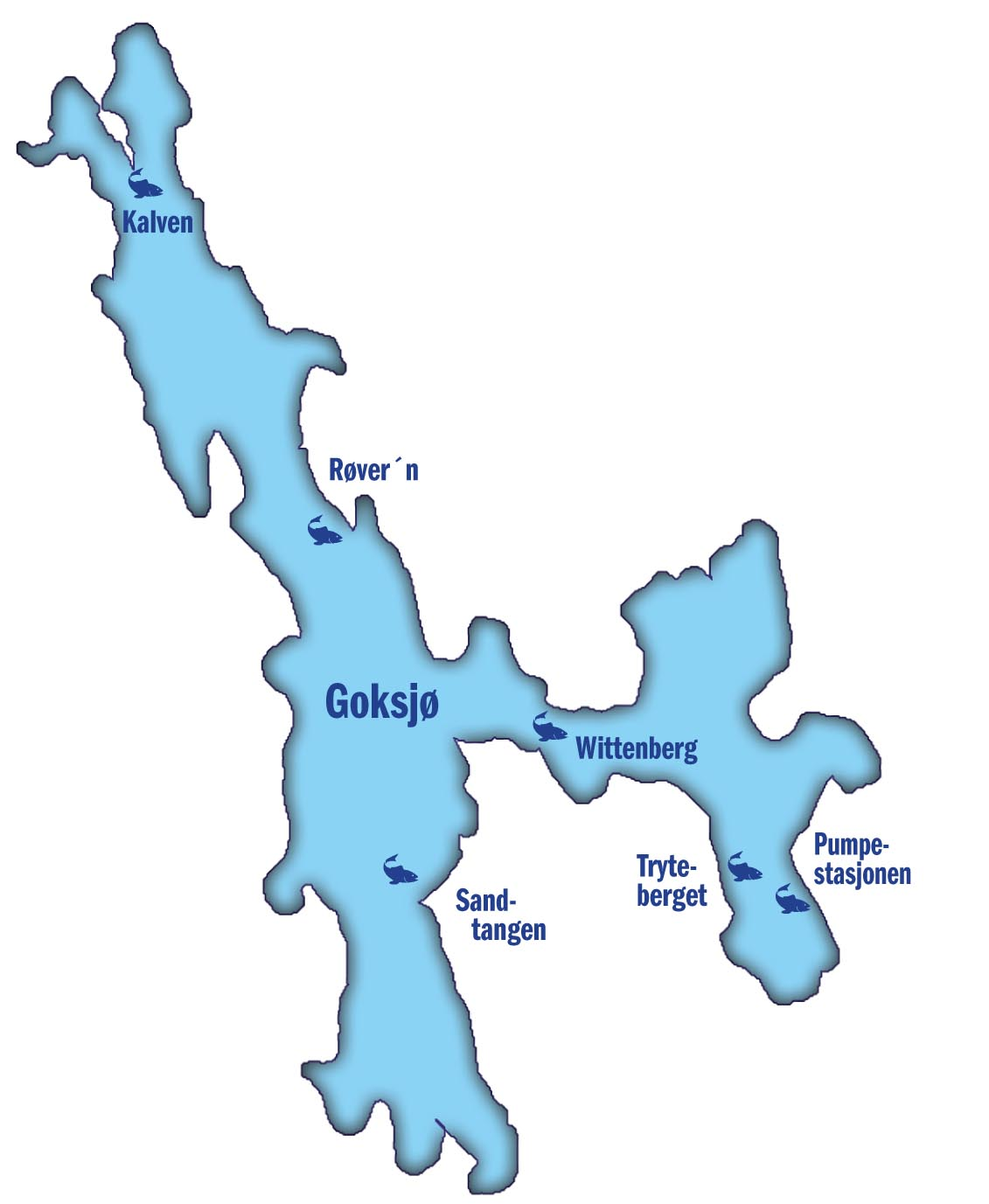
Map of the lake

The lake Goksjø measures 5 kilometres (3.1 mi) from north to south and it has a circumference of about 20 kilometres (12 mi). At its deepest, Goksjø is no deeper than 26 metres (85 ft). Goksjø sits at an elevation of 28 metres (92 ft) above sea level. It is the largest lake in Sandefjord, and the third-largest in Vestfold County.

The lake is surrounded by rural agricultural lands, and flooding occurs on a regular basis. The lake is used for ice-skating, canoeing, swimming, fishing, and other recreational activities. Fish species found here include Northern pike, European perch, Ide, Common dace, European eel, Salmon and Brown trout.

The rivers Storelv and Skorgeelva (the two most important inlets) both flow into the northern part of the lake. The river Hagneselva is the only outlet on the lake and it is located on the northwestern part of the lake. The river flows out of the lake and later joins the lake Åsrumvannet and then it eventually flows into the river Numedalslågen. The lake's most important inlet is the river Storelv, which flows from the lake Askimvannet in Sandefjord Municipality (formerly in Andebu Municipality).

== Name ==
The lake name comes from the Old Norse name Gautsjór. The first element is derived from the old male name Gautr which may have been corrupted to Gok over the centuries. The last element is sjór which means "sea" or "lake".

== See also ==
- List of lakes in Norway
