= Kodal Church =

Church in Vestfold, Norway

- Kodal kirke
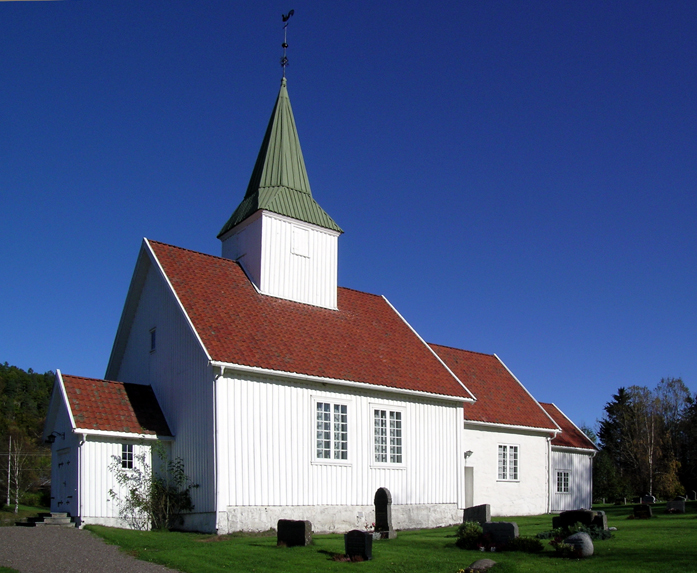
- View of the church
- Kodal Church
- 59°13′53″N 10°07′35″E
- Location: Sandefjord Municipality, Vestfold
- Country: Norway
- Denomination: Church of Norway
- Previous denomination: Catholic Church
- Churchmanship: Evangelical Lutheran

History
- Status: Parish church
- Founded: 12th century
- Consecrated: 12th century

Architecture
- Functional status: Active
- Architectural type: Long church
- Style: Romanesque
- Completed: 1100 (926 years ago)

Specifications
- Capacity: 225
- Materials: Stone and wood

Administration
- Diocese: Tunsberg
- Deanery: Sandefjord prosti
- Parish: Kodal
- Norwegian Cultural Heritage Site
- Type: Church
- Status: Automatically protected
- ID: 84801

Kodal Church (Norwegian: Kodal kirke) is a parish church of the Church of Norway in Sandefjord Municipality in Vestfold county, Norway. It is located in the village of Kodal. It is the church for the Kodal parish which is part of the Sandefjord prosti (deanery) in the Diocese of Tunsberg. The white, stone church was built in a long church design around the year 1100 using plans drawn up by an unknown architect. The church seats about 225 people.

== History ==
The earliest existing historical records of the church date back to the year 1339, but the church was not built that year. The stone church was first built during the 1100s. The Romanesque church has a large rectangular nave and a smaller rectangular chancel with a lower roofline.

Some time during the middle of the 1500s, the church was in such bad condition that the north and west walls of the nave collapsed. The walls were replaced with new wooden walls and the roof was also repaired. By the 1620s, the choir was in poor condition so a renovation took place, repairing the walls, putting in a new floor, and installing a new altar. In the 1630s, the tower on the roof was removed and the roof repaired. In the 1660s, the church was characterized as "dilapidated".

Like other churches in the area, the Count of Jarlsberg took ownership of Kodal Church in 1673. An inspection in 1689 showed the church was in poor condition so a major renovation was undertaken. The renovation was completed in 1691. During this project, the nave roof was taken down and the walls (2 wooden walls and 2 stone walls) were taken down. The four walls were rebuilt using log construction and a new roof was installed with clay tiles. The choir was not rebuilt, so that portion of the building kept its medieval stone walls. Inside, a second story seating gallery was installed.

In 1769, the Count sold the church at auction, and it was bought by the chaplain from Andebu Church together with the local villagers for just 80 dalers. When the medieval Sandar Church, located about 12 kilometers (7.5 mi) south of Kodal Church, was torn down in 1790, the altarpiece and pulpit from Sandar was moved into Kodal Church. The church was restored in 1917 (under the leadership of Haldor Børve).

== Inventory ==
The altarpiece dates from 1781, and the painting Jesus and the Disciples on the Walk to Emmaus by Otto Valstad is painted in the style of Anton Dorph and is from 1899. In 1893, the church received its first organ. In 1919 new bells from the Olsen Nauen Bell Foundry were installed.

== Media gallery ==
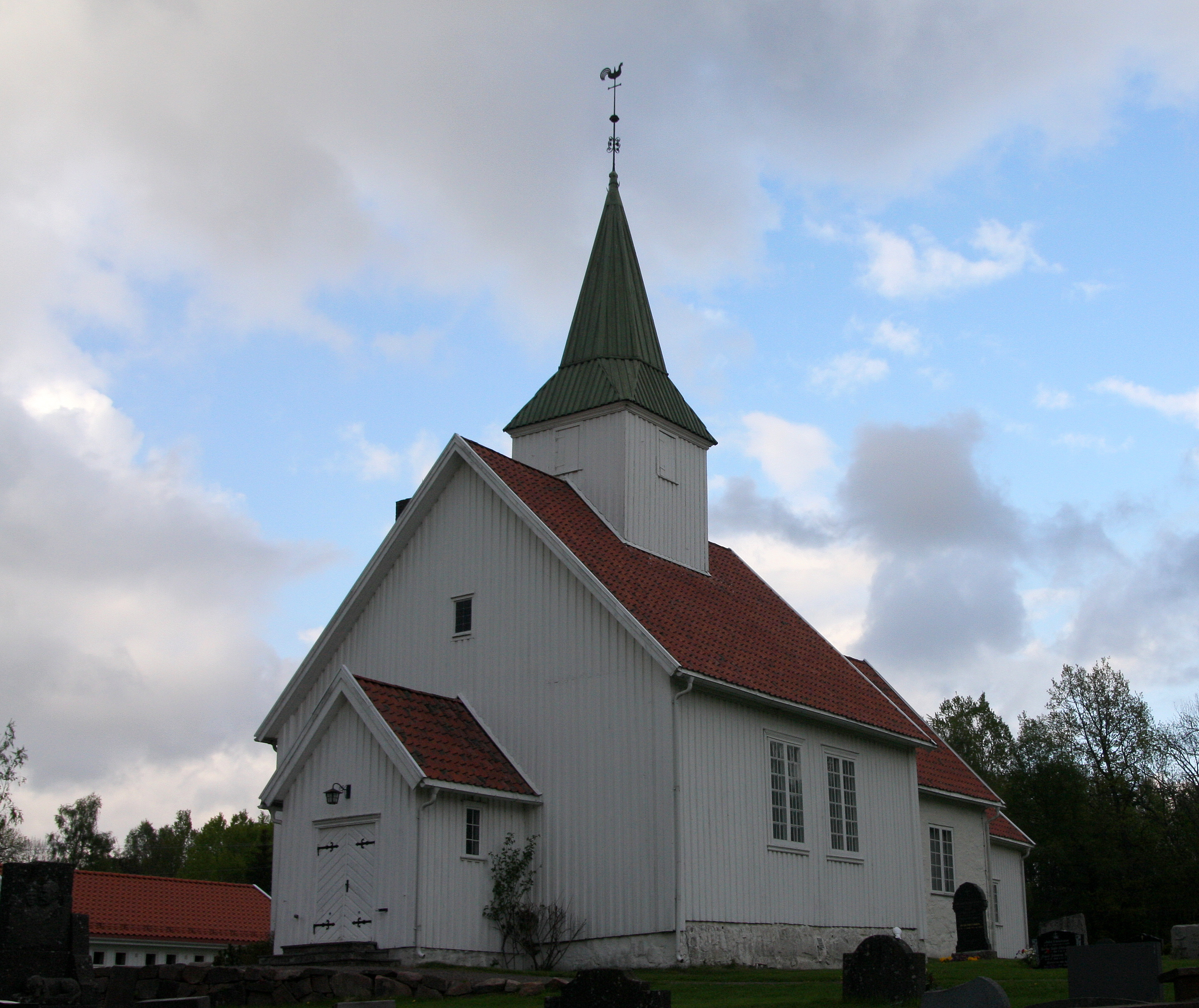

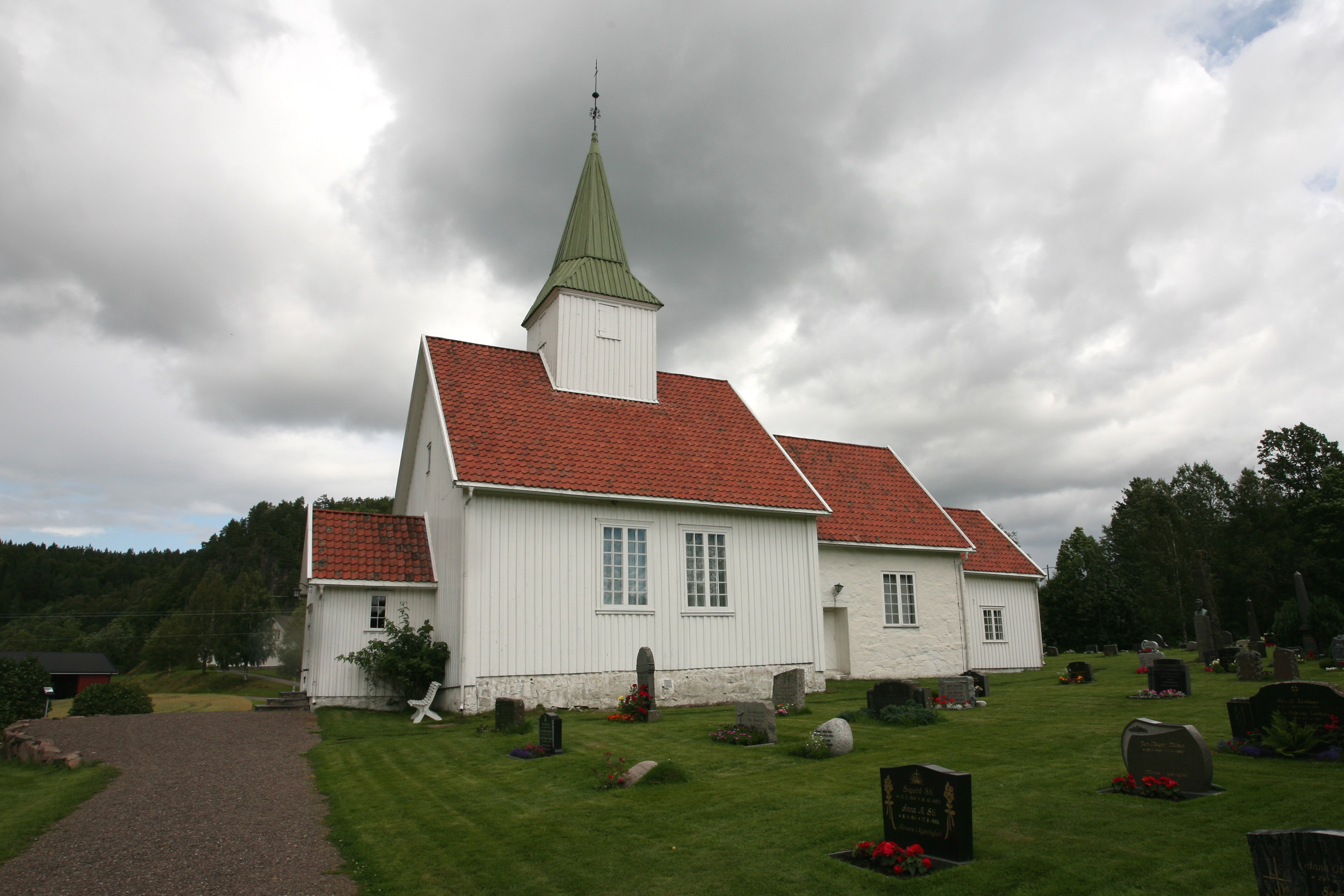

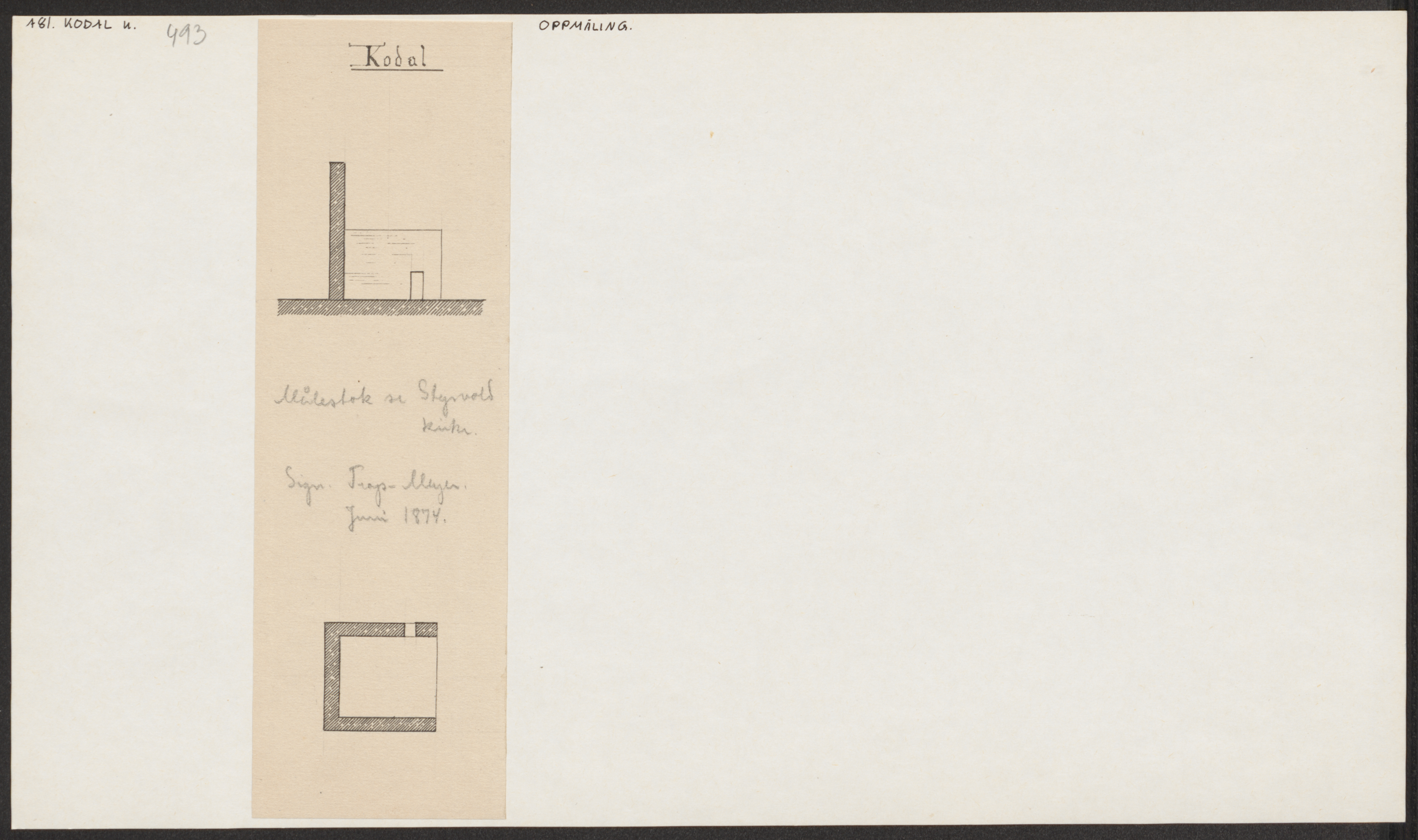

== See also ==
- List of churches in Tunsberg
