= Kodal =

Village in Sandefjord Municipality, Norway

- Village
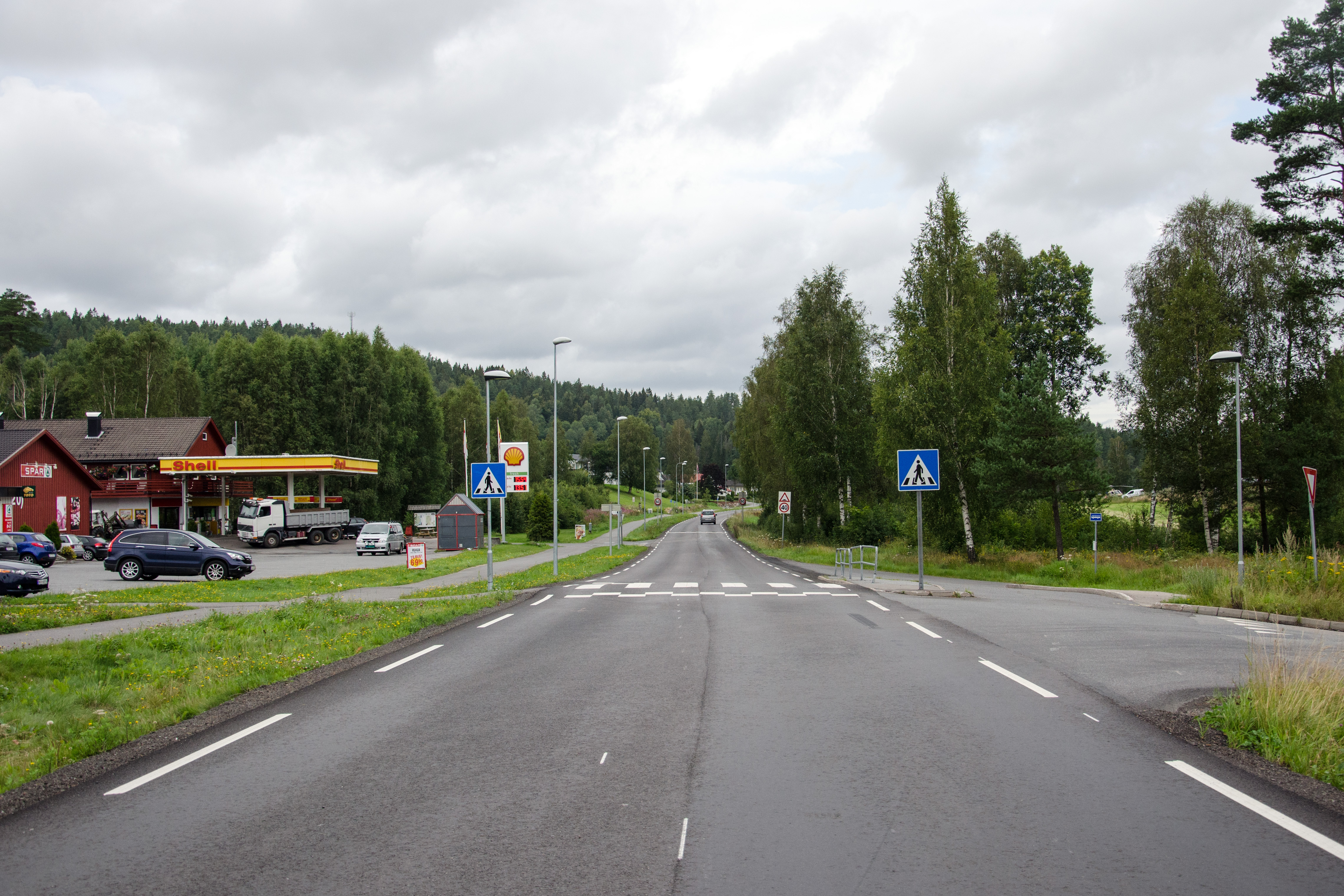
- View of the village
- Interactive map of Kodal
- Coordinates: 59.21446°N 10.13796°E
- Country: Norway
- Region: Eastern Norway
- County: Vestfold
- Municipality: Sandefjord Municipality

Area
  - Total: 0.63 km^{2} (0.24 sq mi)
- Elevation: 56 m (184 ft)

Population (2026)
  - Total: 1,104
  - Density: 1,752/km^{2} (4,540/sq mi)
- Time zone: UTC+01:00 (CET)
  - Summer (DST): UTC+02:00 (CEST)
- Post Code: 3243 Kodal

Kodal is a village in Sandefjord Municipality in Vestfold county, Norway. The village is located about 10 kilometres (6.2 mi) to the north of the city of Sandefjord and about 12 kilometres (7.5 mi) to the south of the village of Andebu.

The 0.63-square-kilometre (160-acre) village has a population (2026) of 1,104 and a population density of 1,752 inhabitants per square kilometre (4,540/sq mi).

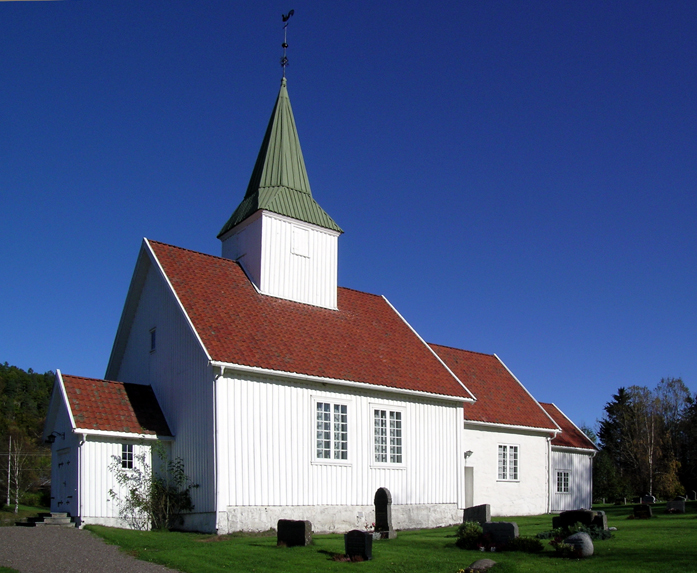
Kodal Church

Kodal has one gas station, an elementary school, a kindergarten, grocery store, and sports center. There are several burial mounds dating back to the Viking Age that have been found in the area. Kodal Church is located at Prestbøen, about 2 kilometres (1.2 mi) north of the village centre. Agriculture is an important industry in Kodal, but large amounts of iron and phosphorus are also found. The amount of granite is estimated to be 100,000,000 tonnes (98,000,000 long tons; 110,000,000 short tons).

== Etymology ==
The village is named after the site of the historic Kodal Church. The Old Norse form of the name Kvǫðudalr or Kváðudalr. The first element is the old name for the local river Ivjua which was formerly known as Kvaða or Kvæða. The meaning of the old river name is uncertain. It may have been derived from the word kóð which means "shallow waters". Another option is that it may have been derived from the word kvaða which means "resin", referring to the vast Norway spruce forests in the area. The last element is dalr which means "valley" or "dale". The spelling of the name has changed over time. Some written forms of the name were Kvodal (from 1376), Kuadal (1390), Quadal (1414), and Quodal (1558). Its current spelling Kodal is kept from the 17th century.

== Recreation ==
An ancient hill fort can be seen about 5 kilometres (3.1 mi) from the village centre of Kodal, connected by a hiking trail from the village centre. A closer parking lot can be found at Kodalveien 414. The trail is marked by blue paint on trees and rocks, and a variety of interpretive signs describing the fauna and flora can be found on the trail to Bygdeborgen. The local lake Gallisvannet sits at the north end of the village at an elevation of 44 metres (144 ft) above sea level. The lake Goksjø is located about 3 kilometres (1.9 mi) to the south of the village.
