= Kaare Reitan =

Norwegian orthodontist

- Born: 8 August 1903; Norway
- Died: 8 October 2000 (aged 97)
- Education: Northwestern University, University of Oslo
- Known for: Albert H. Ketcham Award Recipient, known for his histological research experimental introducing the idea of possible effects of orthodontic tooth movement on teeth and surrounding tissues
- Medical career
- Profession: Dentist
- Institutions: University of Oslo
- Sub-specialties: orthodontics

Kaare Reitan (8 August 1903 – 8 October 2000) was a Norwegian orthodontist who was instrumental in introducing through his histological research experiments the responses of tissues to orthodontic tooth movement. His experiments set a foundation for future research on the effects on surrounding tissues of teeth by the mechanical forces of orthodontics. He was a recipient of Albert H. Ketcham Award.

== Life ==
He was born in Andebu Municipality, Norway. He then traveled to Paris to study linguistics and dentistry. He completed his dental degree in 1928 from a dental school there. He then started working in Sandefjord as a dentist. He then traveled to US and enrolled himself at the Northwestern University in Chicago in 1937. He completed his orthodontics and received his Masters there in 1939. He then started working under Dr. William Skillen and Balint Orban for the histological research. Later he returned to Norway in 1940 and practiced orthodontics.

== Orthodontics ==
In 1946, he investigated the morphology of tissue changes and presented his thesis in 1951 called "The initial tissue reaction incident to orthodontic tooth movement as related to the influence of function". He worked on dogs on his experiment. His research was key in distinguishing the tissue response difference between animals and humans. His research was important in introducing possibly detrimental effects of orthodontics on tooth movement. He then returned to US in 1950 and further worked with Dr. Gottlieb, Dr. Sicher and Dr. Weinmann. His research focused on histological reactions in teeth and surrounding tissues. He studied the factors that influenced orthodontic tooth movement.

He published over 50 papers and has contributed to many chapters of orthodontic textbooks.

== Awards and recognition ==
- John Valentine Mershon Lecturer - 1966
- Prix George Villain - 1967
- Albert H. Ketcham Award - 1976
- Honorary member of Danish and Norwegian Orthodontic Societies - 1972
- Honorary Doctorate from University of Gothenburg and University of Bergen
