= Høyjord Stave Church =

Church in Vestfold, Norway

- Høyjord stavkirke
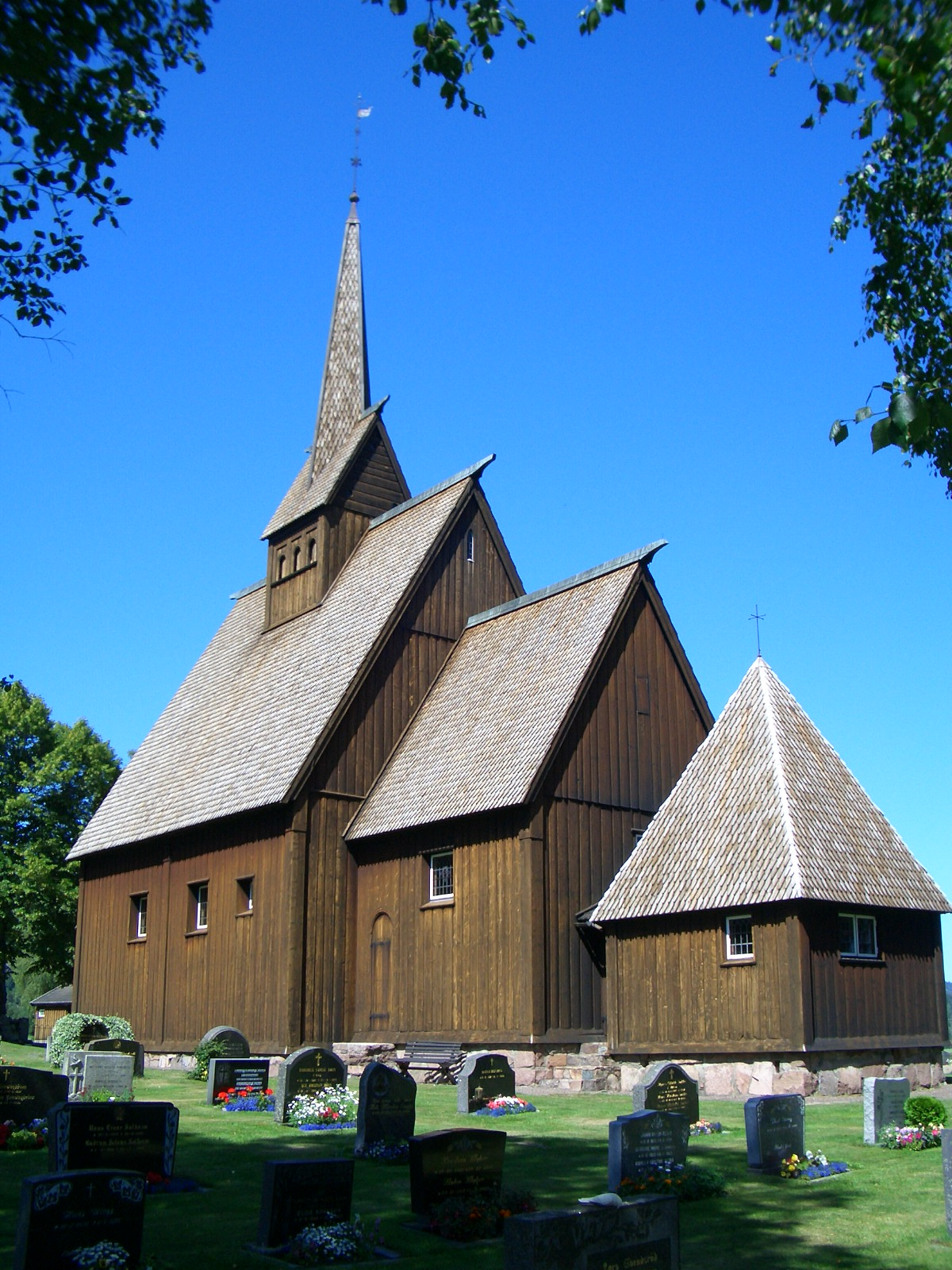
- View of the church
- Høyjord Stave Church
- 59°22′03″N 10°07′16″E
- Location: Sandefjord Municipality, Vestfold
- Country: Norway
- Denomination: Church of Norway
- Previous denomination: Catholic Church
- Churchmanship: Evangelical Lutheran

History
- Status: Parish church
- Founded: 12th-century
- Consecrated: 12th-century

Architecture
- Functional status: Active
- Architectural type: Stave church
- Style: Numedal type
- Completed: c. 1150 (876 years ago)

Specifications
- Capacity: 150
- Materials: Wood

Administration
- Diocese: Tunsberg
- Deanery: Sandefjord prosti
- Parish: Høyjord
- Norwegian Cultural Heritage Site
- Type: Church
- Status: Automatically protected
- ID: 84703

Høyjord Stave Church (Norwegian: Høyjord stavkirke) is a parish church of the Church of Norway in Sandefjord Municipality in Vestfold county, Norway. It is located in the village of Høyjord. It is the church for the Høyjord parish which is part of the Sandefjord prosti (deanery) in the Diocese of Tunsberg. The brown, wooden church was built in a stave church design during the late 12th century using plans drawn up by an unknown architect. The church seats about 150 people.

The church is the only stave church still standing in Vestfold county. It is also Norway's southernmost stave church that still looks like its original form. The church is one of three remaining center post churches (midtmastkirke) in Norway. The present stave church is commonly dated to around the year 1300, however, parts of the church were constructed in the 1100s and in 1275.

The church is single-naved building with a square chancel. It is a Numedal-type stave church. Restorations were initiated in the 1600s. After World War II it also underwent restoration. The medieval nave and the chancel's main structural components are preserved. Its wooden vault over the chancel has been reconstructed.

== History ==
The earliest existing historical records of the church date back to the year 1374, but the church was not built that year. The church was constructed in two different centuries. The present chancel of the church was built some time between the years 1150 and 1200. It was built in a 12th-century Romanesque style. The small building originally served as the whole church. About 100 years later, in 1275, a much larger Gothic-style nave was built to the west of the original building. After the nave was completed, the old part of the building became the choir. The nave had 12 large staves holding up the roof, each with a unique design plus it had a large central stave post that held up the roof. The central post of this type was built to symbolize Jesus, while the twelve existing posts holding up the roof symbolized the twelve apostles. Originally, the church had open-air corridors that encircled the whole building.

In 1689, the church was in disrepair, and a major renovation was carried out. The exterior open-air corridors were removed and exterior wood paneling was installed. Also in 1689, a new roof was installed and a central post was probably removed at this time since the roof was rebuilt. In 1840, the church interior was renovated. Wood panelling was installed and new (rather large) windows were installed.

By 1904, the church looked a lot like most modern churches with wood siding and painted white. At that time, a historical investigation took place to see how much of the old medieval stave church construction actually remained in the building. After World War II, a major reconstruction took place from 1948-1953, led by Otto L. Scheen. The goal of this project was to return the church to its medieval look. A foundation stone for a central post was discovered during the restorations. A replica of the old central post was installed, paint was removed, and new exterior paneling was installed. The roof and tower were reconstructed as well, using the Old Nes Stave Church in Hallingdal as a model (that church in Hallingdal had been torn down in 1864). A new church porch was built to the west of the nave and a new sacristy was built to the east of the choir. It was found that the main structure of the nave and choir were mostly authentic so they were kept, but all of the timber-framed parts of the church were removed. Medieval discoveries were also found during this work, including a consecration cross, proving the church had been consecrated by the bishop. In 1960, the church's altarpiece was restored by Finn Kraft.

During the 1948-53 restorations, five preserved skeletons of a man, two children, and two women were retrieved from under a thin layer of soil beneath the chancel floor. The bodies were dated to the time of the Black Death in the mid-1300s.

== Media gallery ==
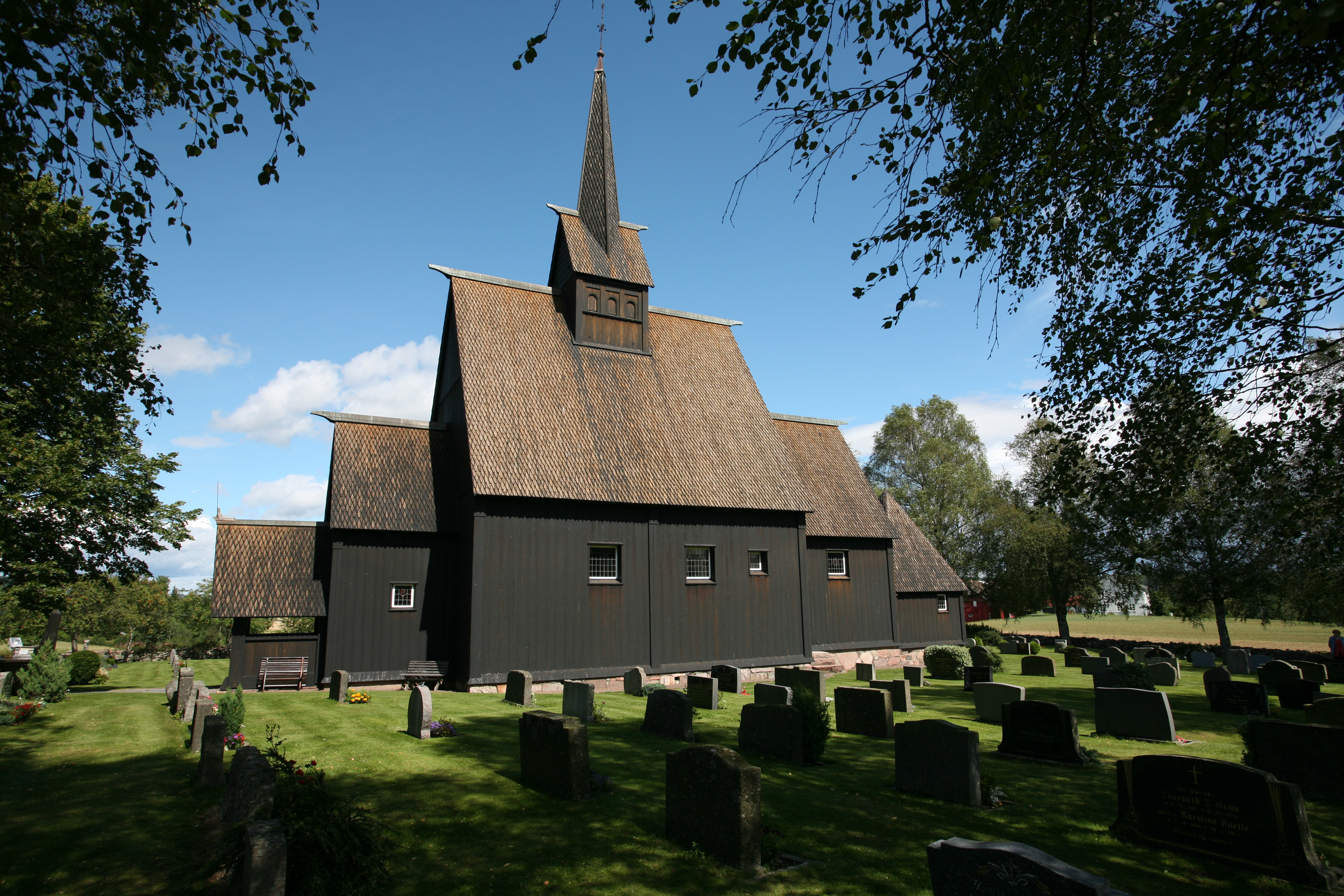

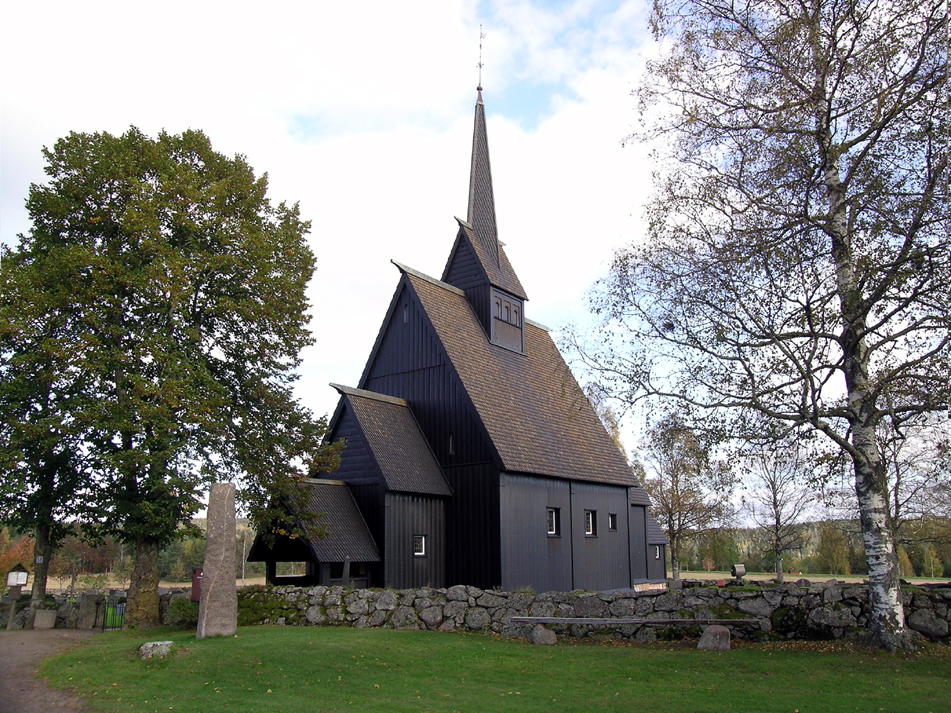

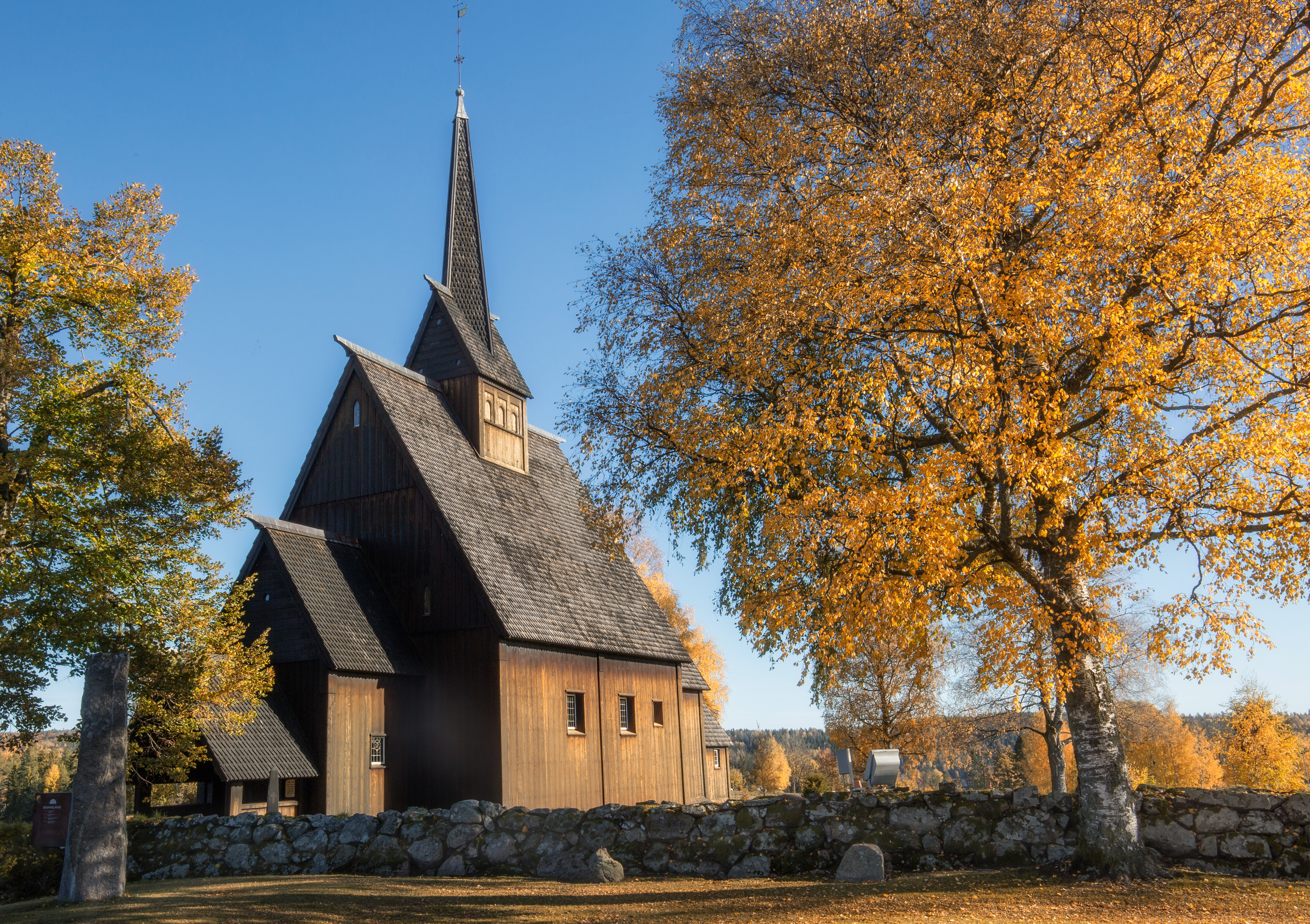

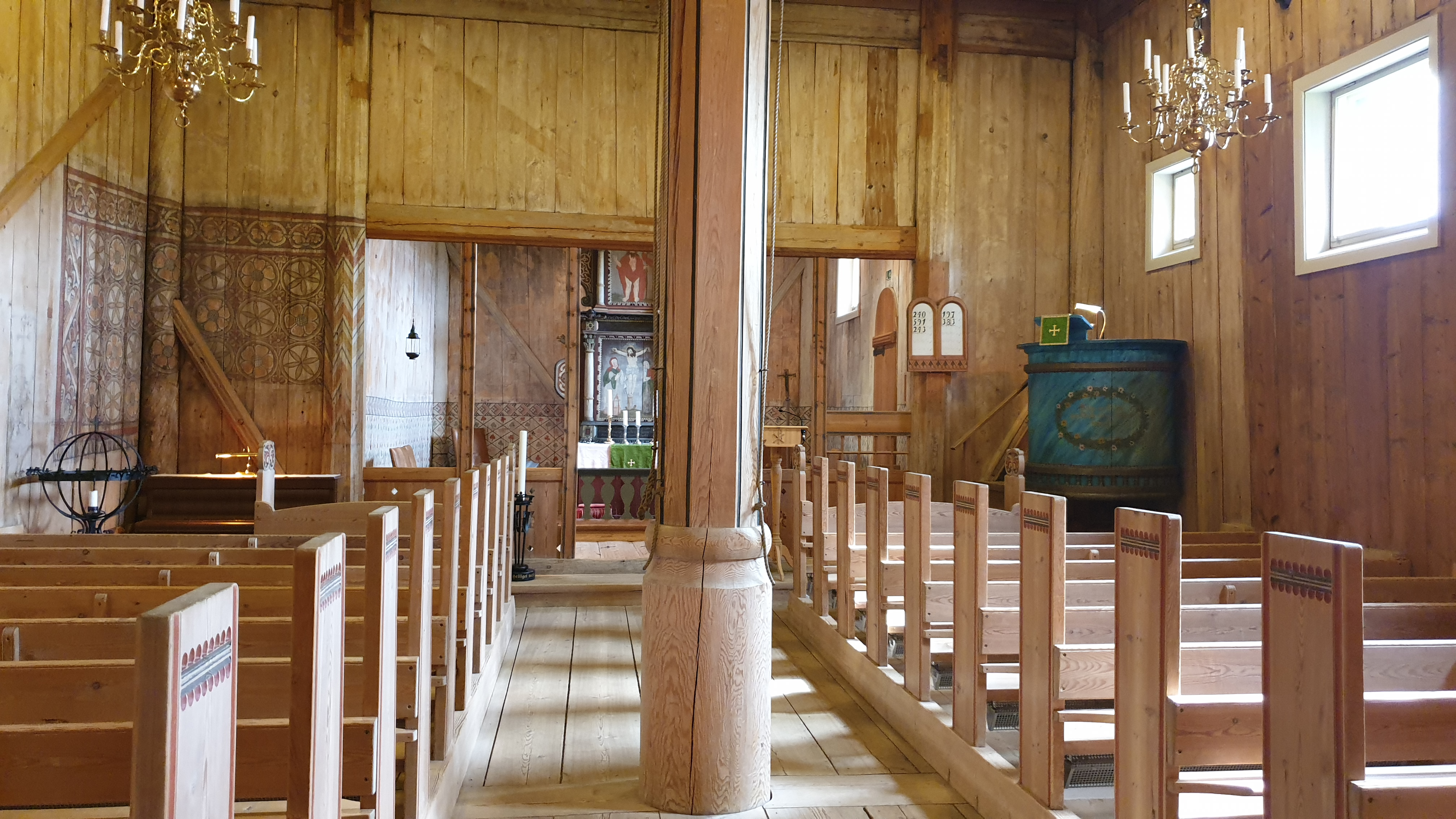
Interior with central stave post

Details of the roof

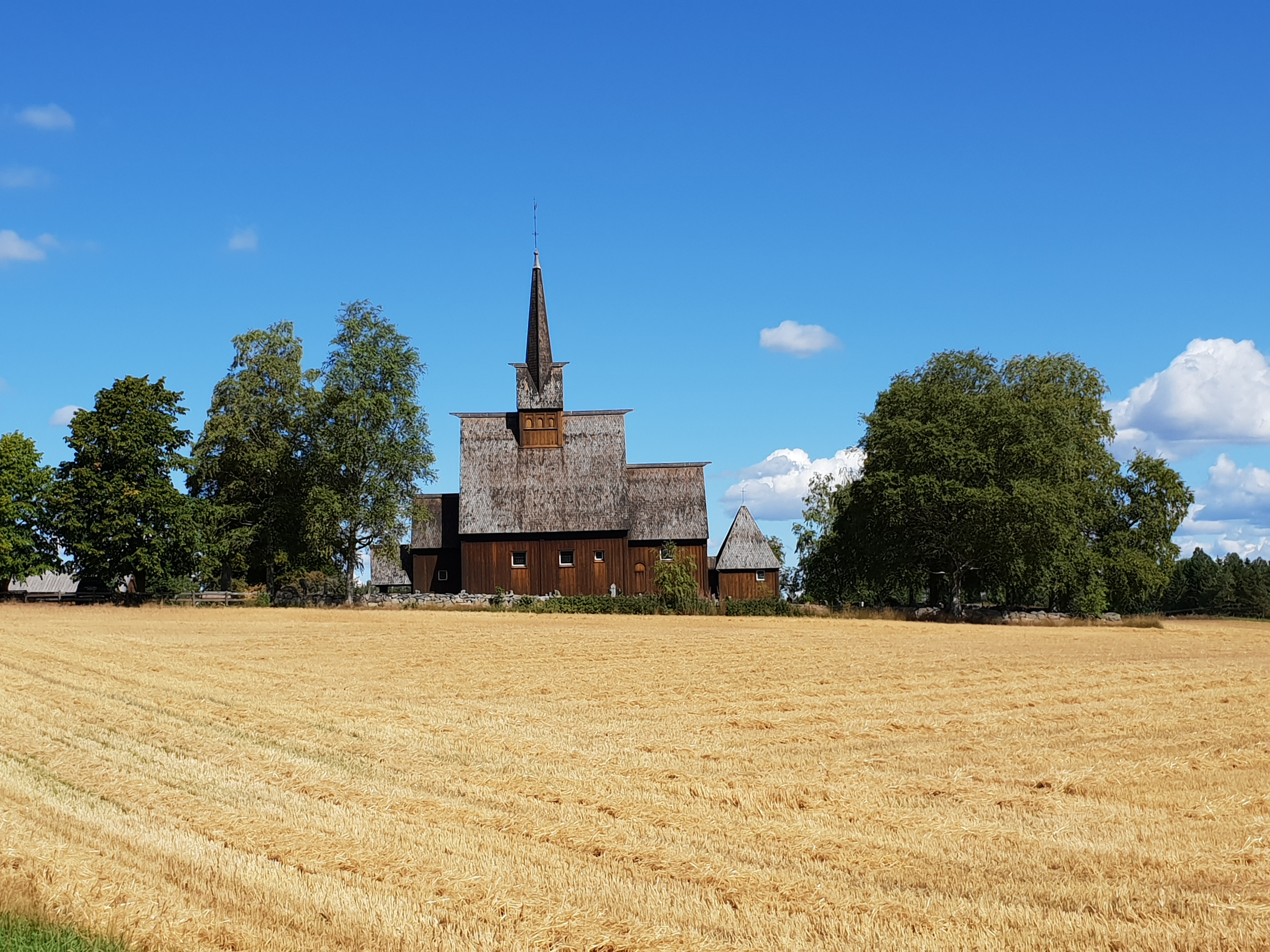

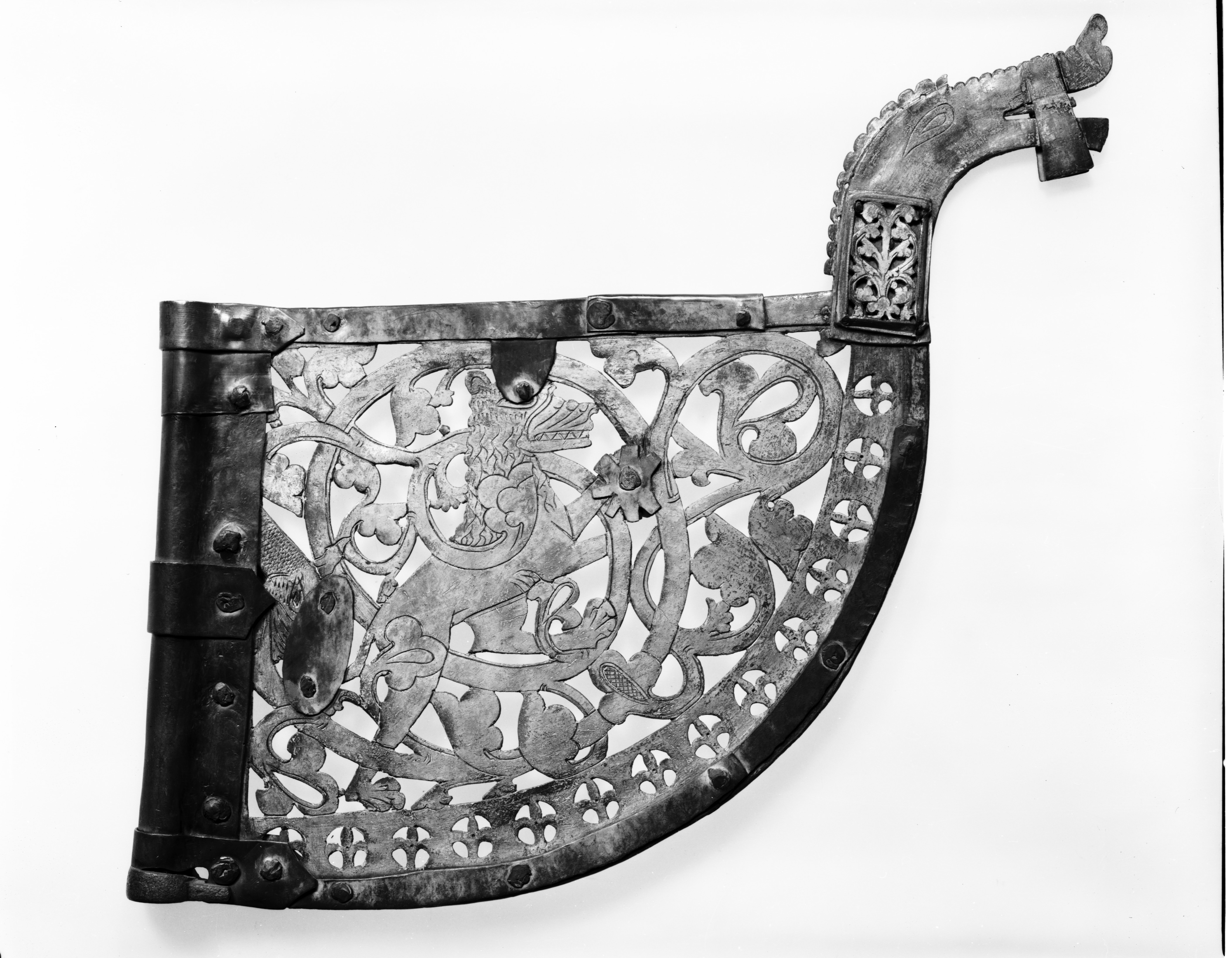
Høyjord weather vane

== See also ==
- List of churches in Tunsberg

== Related reading ==
- Anker, Leif (2005). The Norwegian Stave Churches. Oslo: Arfo Forlag. ISBN 9788291399294.
