= Skrim =

Mountain in Buskerud, Norway

Highest point
- Elevation: 859 m (2,818 ft)
- Prominence: 188 m (617 ft)
- Isolation: 3.2 km (2.0 mi)
- Coordinates: 59°30′55″N 9°35′14″E

Geography
- Location: Buskerud, Norway

Skrim is a mountain in Kongsberg Municipality in Buskerud county, Norway. The 859-metre (2,818 ft) tall mountain is located about 16 kilometres (9.9 mi) southwest of the town of Kongsberg.

== See also ==
- List of mountains of Norway by height
