= Andebu Church =

Church in Vestfold, Norway

- Andebu kirke
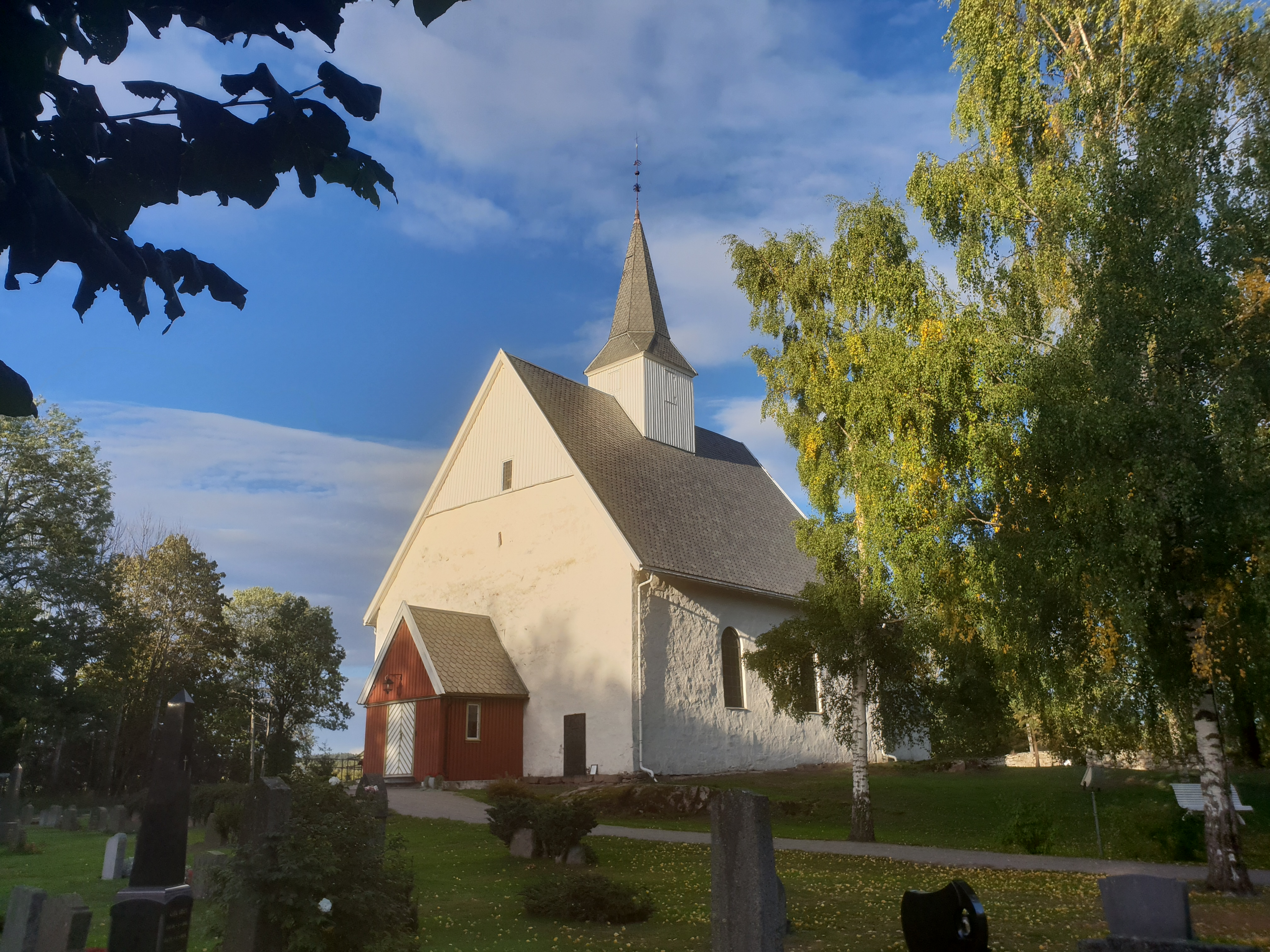
- View of the church
- Andebu Church
- 59°18′32″N 10°10′37″E
- Location: Sandefjord Municipality, Vestfold
- Country: Norway
- Denomination: Church of Norway
- Previous denomination: Catholic Church
- Churchmanship: Evangelical Lutheran

History
- Status: Parish church
- Founded: c. 1100
- Consecrated: 28 February (c. 1100)

Architecture
- Functional status: Active
- Architectural type: Long church
- Completed: c. 1100 (926 years ago)

Specifications
- Capacity: 300
- Materials: Stone

Administration
- Diocese: Tunsberg
- Deanery: Sandefjord prosti
- Parish: Andebu
- Norwegian Cultural Heritage Site
- Type: Church
- Status: Automatically protected
- ID: 83777

Andebu Church (Norwegian: Andebu kirke) is a parish church of the Church of Norway in Sandefjord Municipality in Vestfold county, Norway. It is located in the village of Andebu. It is the church for the Andebu parish which is part of the Sandefjord prosti (deanery) in the Diocese of Tunsberg. The white, stone church was built in a long church design around the year 1100 using plans drawn up by an unknown architect. The church seats about 300 people.

== History ==
The earliest existing historical records of the church date back to the year 1314, but the church was not built that year. The church was likely built around the year 1100 and it was consecrated on 28 February, but the year is unknown. Originally, the church consisted of a nave and chancel with no tower. Later, a small stone sacristy was built on the east end of the chancel and a small wooden church porch was built on the west end of the nave. In 1673, the church was purchased by the County of Jarlsberg. In 1686, the church was extensively restored after a number of years of decay. It received a new roof, a new bell tower on the roof, and larger windows among other things. In 1701, the roof tower was destroyed in a storm and it was rebuilt. In 1769, the church was sold to the parish of Andebu.

In 1814, this church served as an election church (Norwegian: valgkirke). Together with more than 300 other parish churches across Norway, it was a polling station for elections to the 1814 Norwegian Constituent Assembly which wrote the Constitution of Norway. This was Norway's first national elections. Each church parish was a constituency that elected people called "electors" who later met together in each county to elect the representatives for the assembly that was to meet at Eidsvoll Manor later that year.

== Media gallery ==
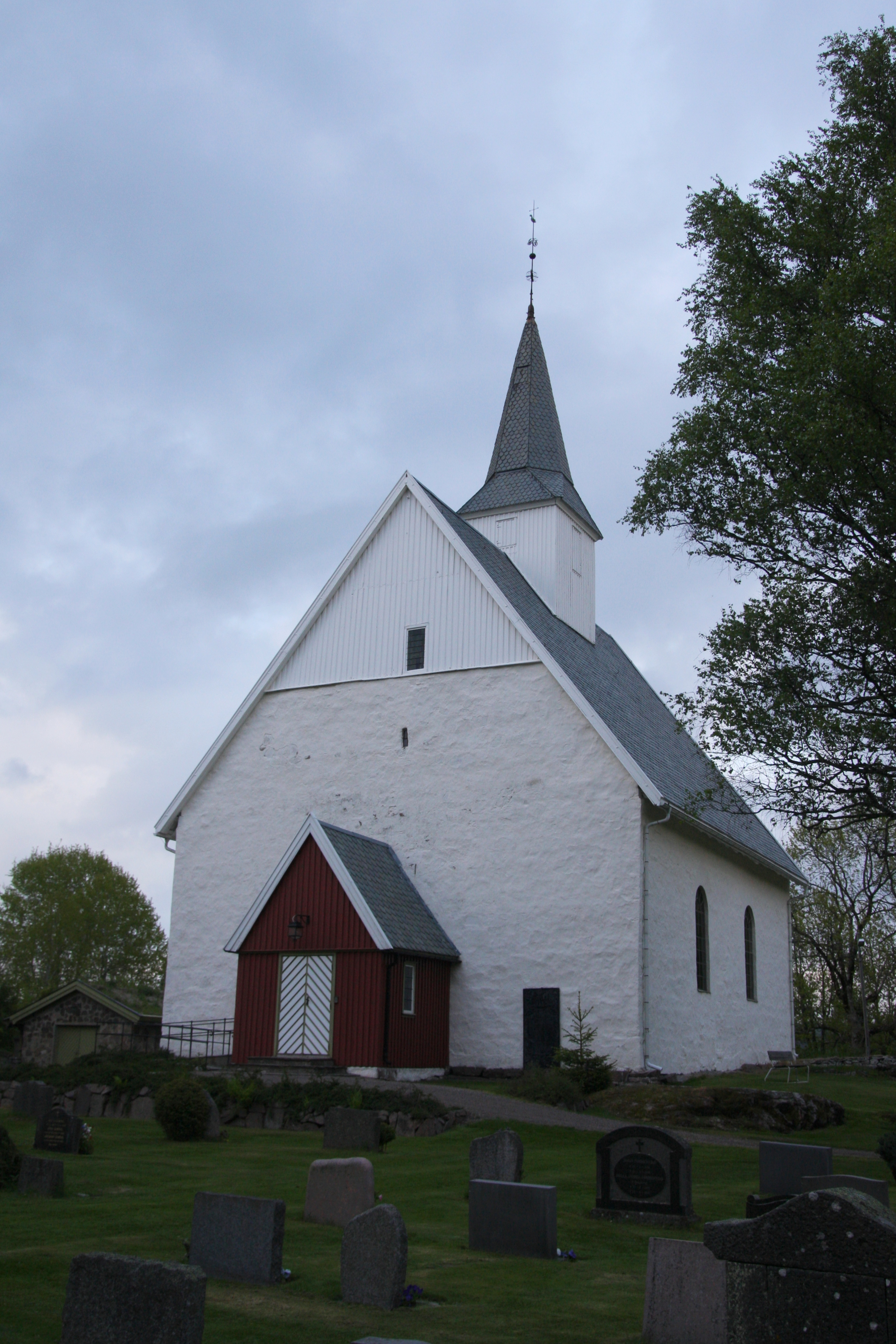

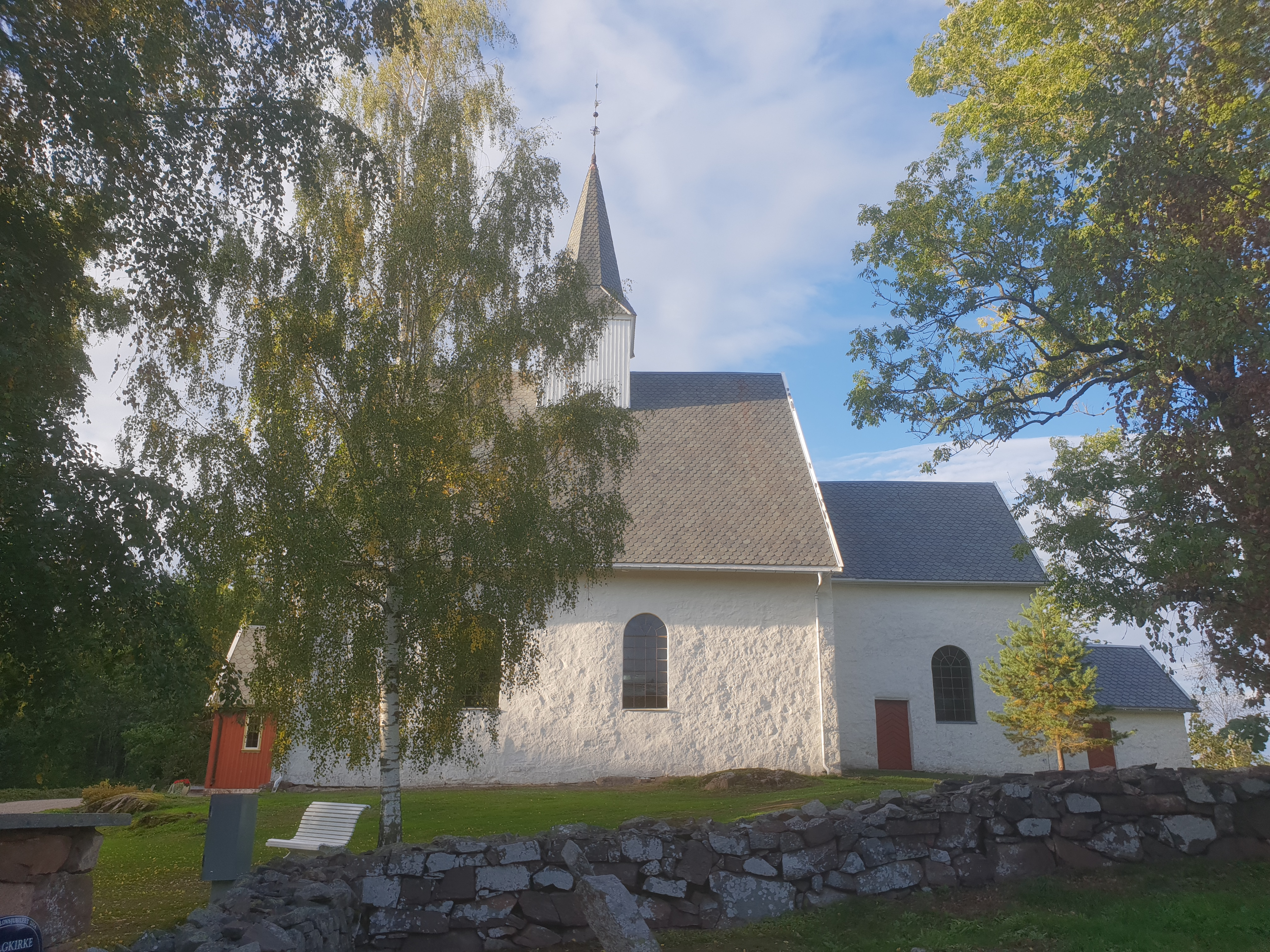

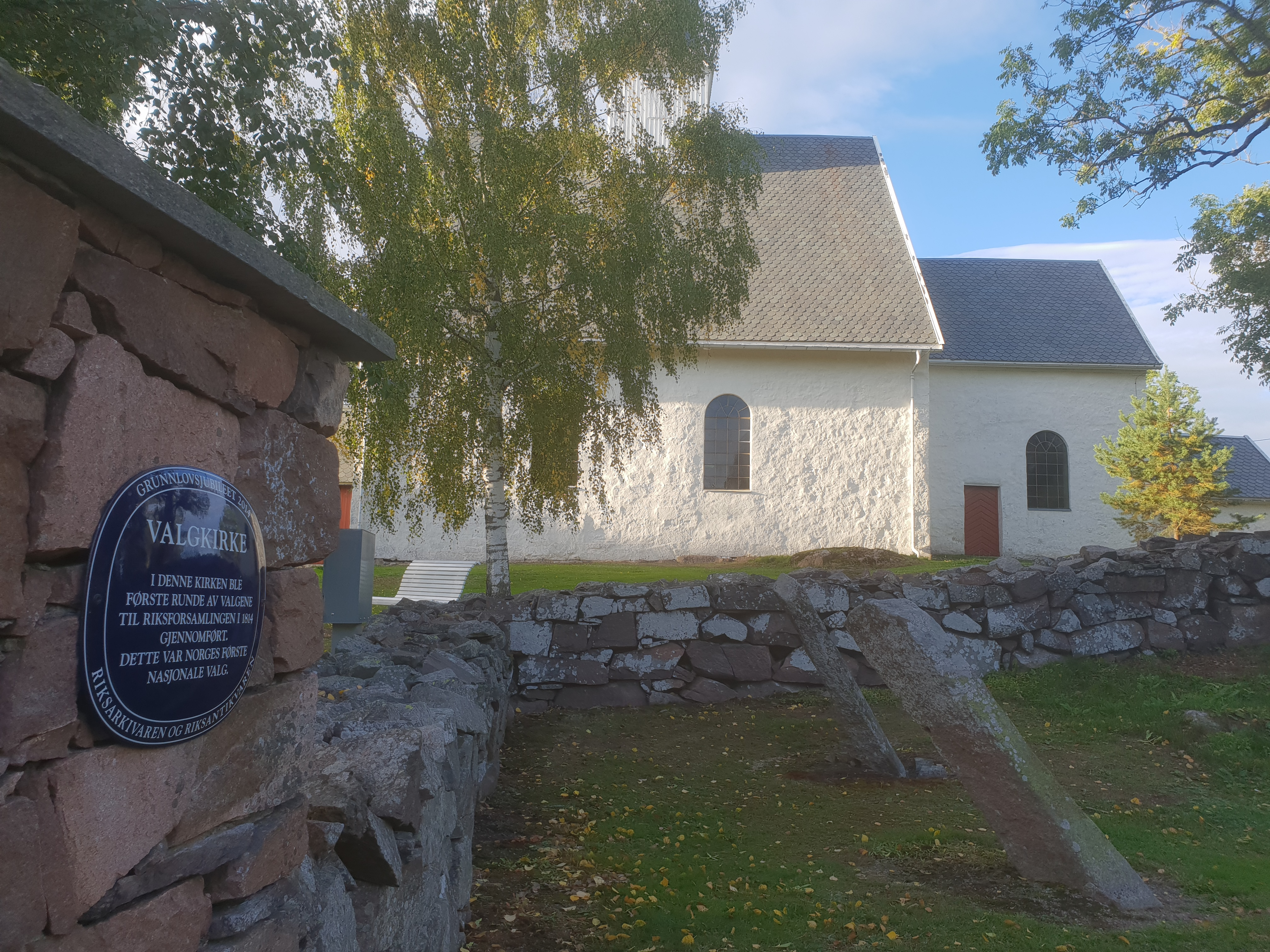

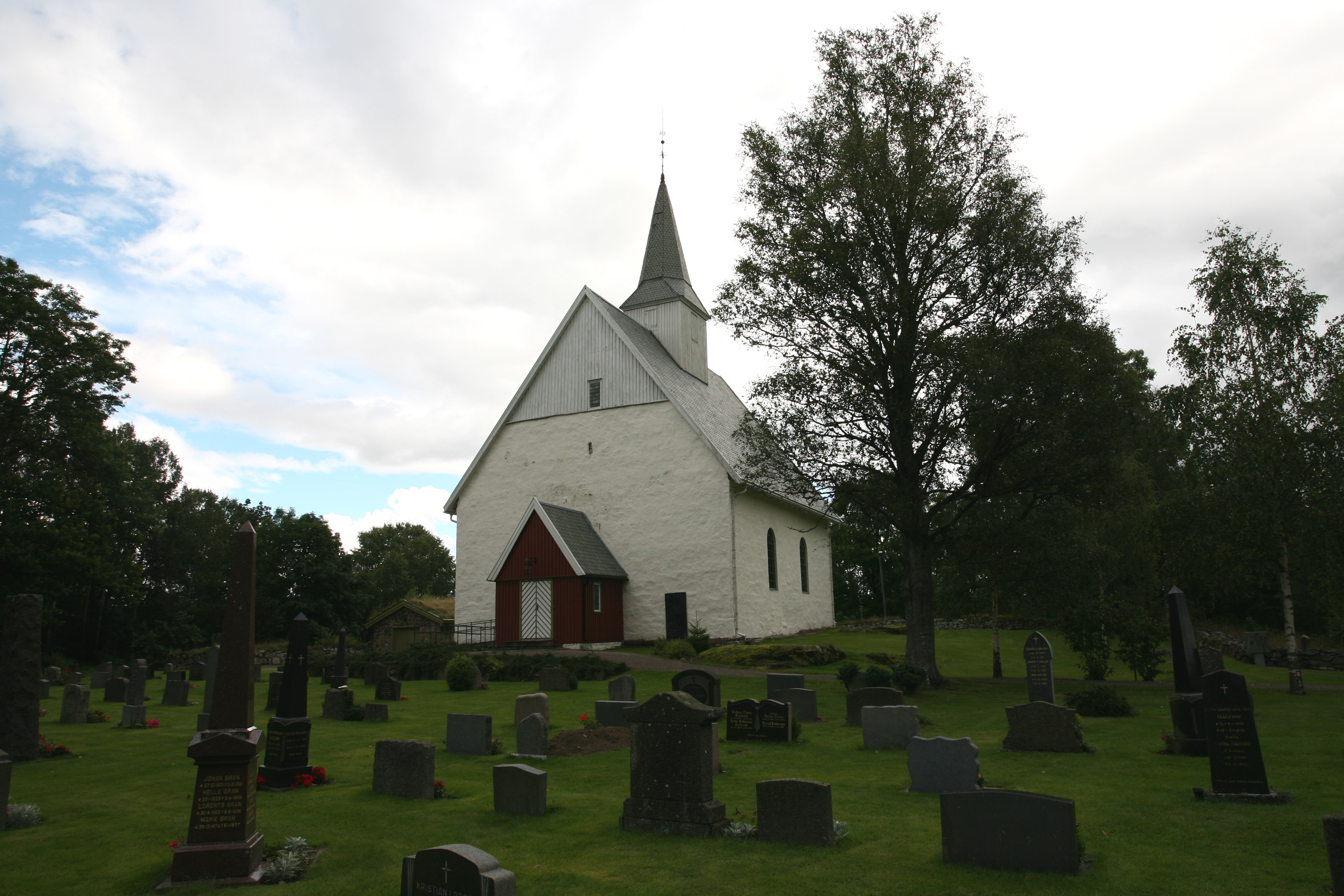

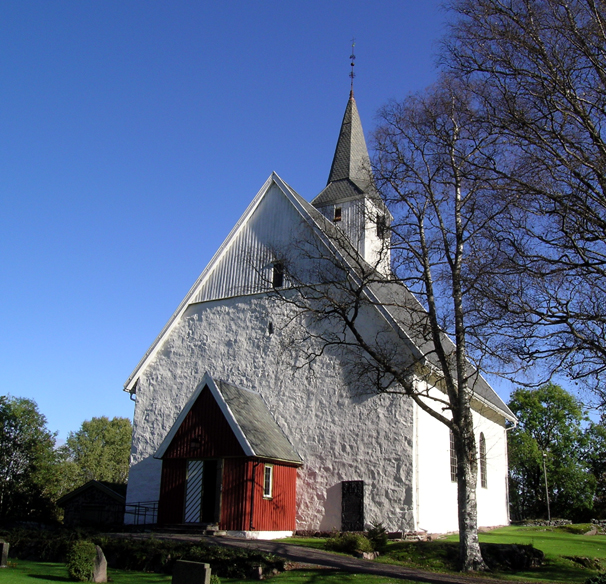

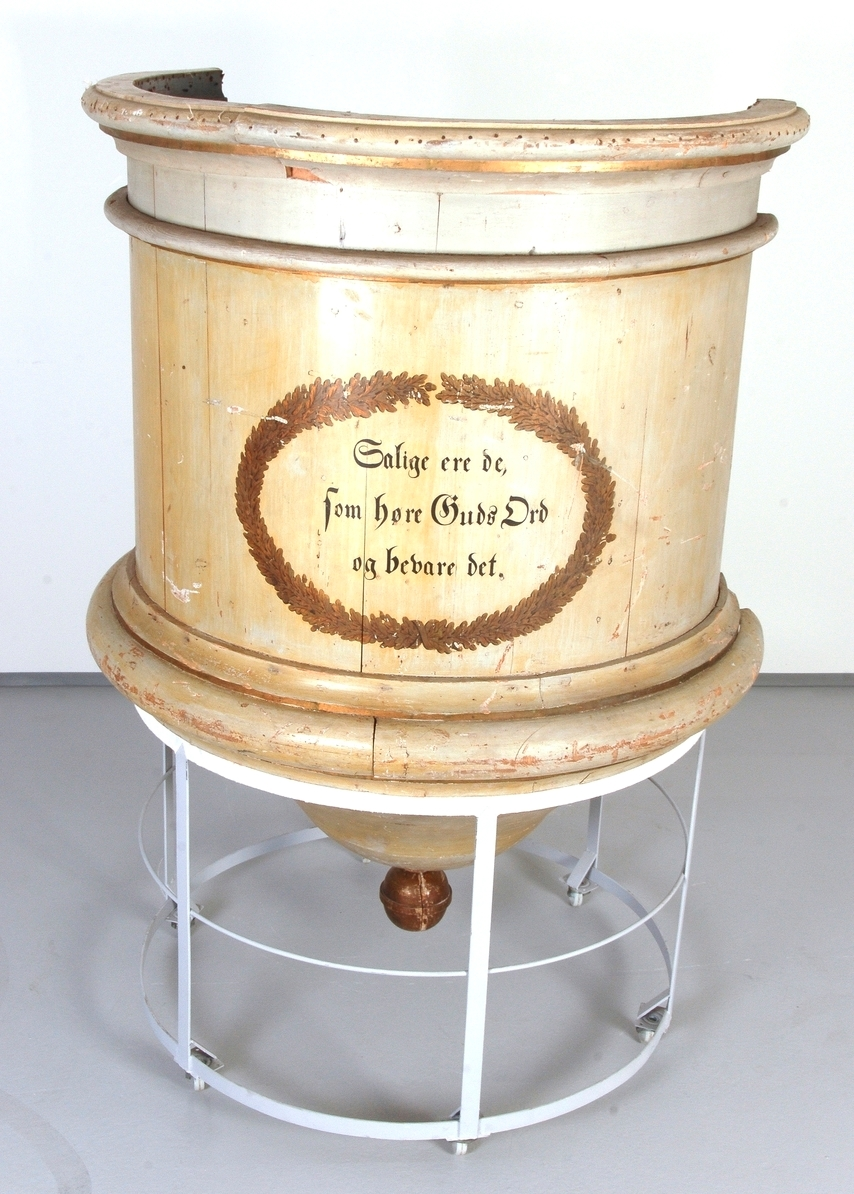

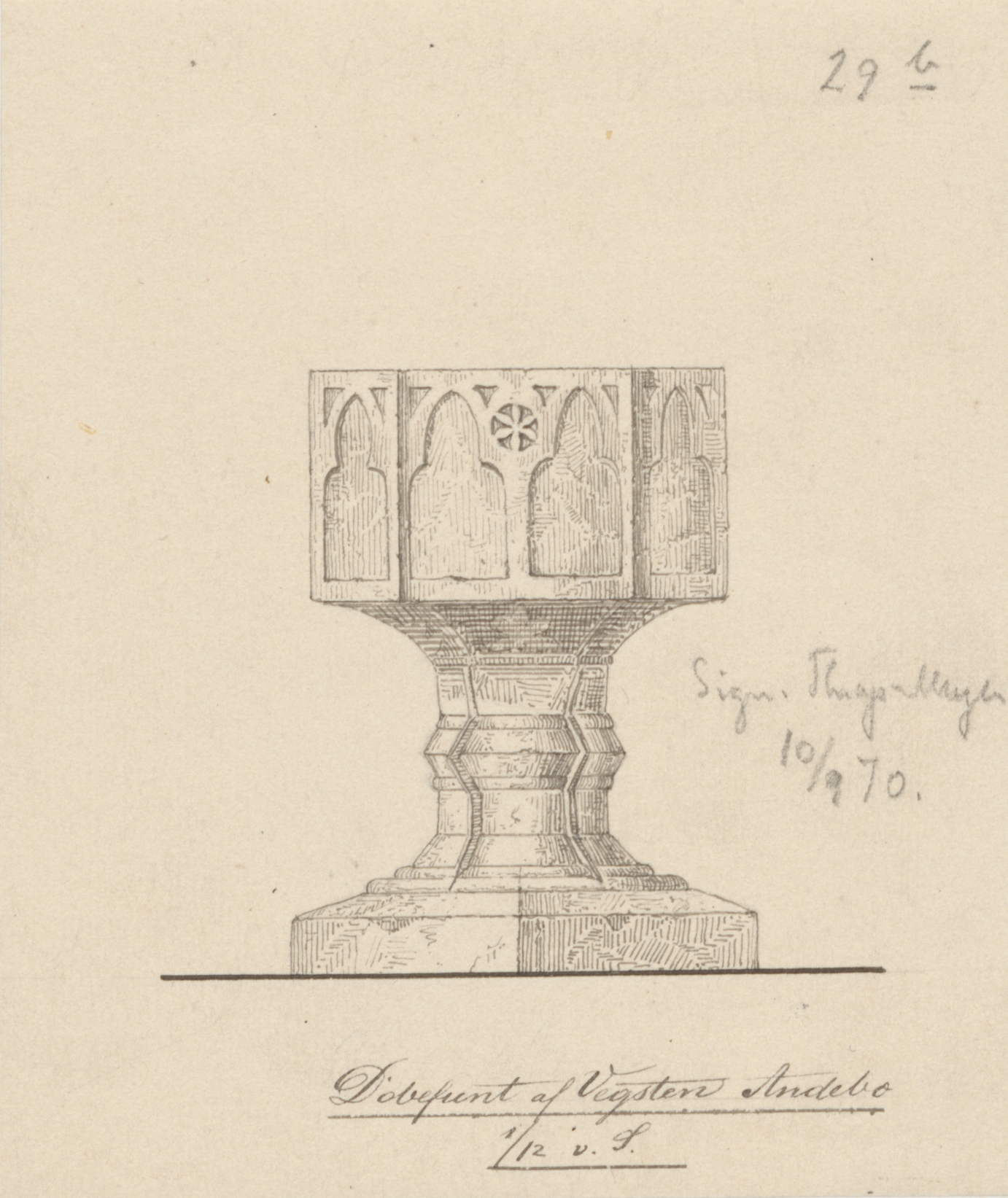

== See also ==
- List of churches in Tunsberg
