= Andebu (village) =

Village in Sandefjord Municipality, Norway

- Village
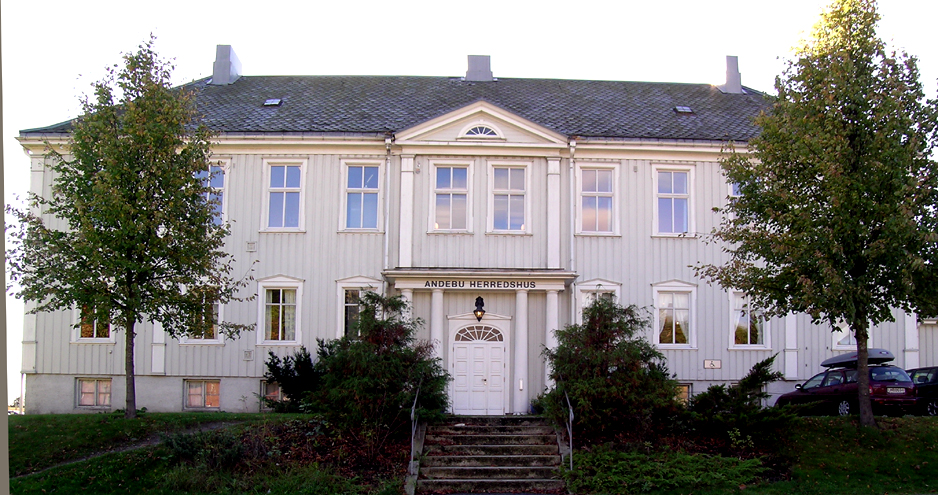
- View of the historic municipal building in Andebu
- Interactive map of Andebu
- Coordinates: 59.30591°N 10.17656°E
- Country: Norway
- Region: Eastern Norway
- County: Vestfold
- Municipality: Sandefjord Municipality

Area
  - Total: 1.89 km^{2} (0.73 sq mi)
- Elevation: 55 m (180 ft)

Population (2022)
  - Total: 2,503
  - Density: 1,324/km^{2} (3,430/sq mi)
- Time zone: UTC+01:00 (CET)
  - Summer (DST): UTC+02:00 (CEST)
- Post Code: 3158 Andebu

Andebu is a village in Sandefjord Municipality in Vestfold county, Norway. It is located about 20 kilometres (12 mi) north of the city of Sandefjord and about 15 kilometres (9.3 mi) to the west of the city of Tønsberg.

The 1.89-square-kilometre (470-acre) village has a population (in 2026) of 2,503 and a population density of 1,324 inhabitants per square kilometre (3,430/sq mi).

== History ==
The village was the administrative centre of the old Andebu Municipality which existed from 1838 until its dissolution on 1 January 2017 when it became part of Sandefjord Municipality. The medieval Andebu Church is located on the north side of the village. An elementary school and a secondary school are located in the village.
