= Sang til Sandefjord =

1930s song by Thorleif Jacobsen

Sang til Sandefjord was written to the town of Sandefjord by Thorleif Jacobsen in the 1930s. The original music was composed by Baard Heradstveit. However, his melody was considered to be very difficult to sing. In order to revitalize the song, Rolf Hansen Stub composed an alternative melody in the early 1980s, which is the one in use today.
The melody has been played daily from the carillon of Sandefjord Kirke.

== Lyrics ==
Sandefjord, du by blandt alle
hvor vår vei så enn kan falle.
Deg vi elsker høyst i verden
i vårt liv og all vår ferden.
:/: Vakre by ved fjordens bund
alltid ungdomsfrisk og sund. :/:

By med utferd, by med evne
til mot store mål å stevne.
By med fest og by med hygge
hvor vårt livsverk vi vil bygge.
:/: Vinter, sommer, høst og vår
er du byen, byen vår. :/:

Fangstmann, se det når du kommer
hjem til Norges vår og sommer,
når du stevner inn ad fjorden
til den beste by på jorden.
:/: Du er byen, byen vår
nu i dag og alle år. :/:
