= Granholmen, Sandefjord =

Island in Vestfold, Norway

Granholmen
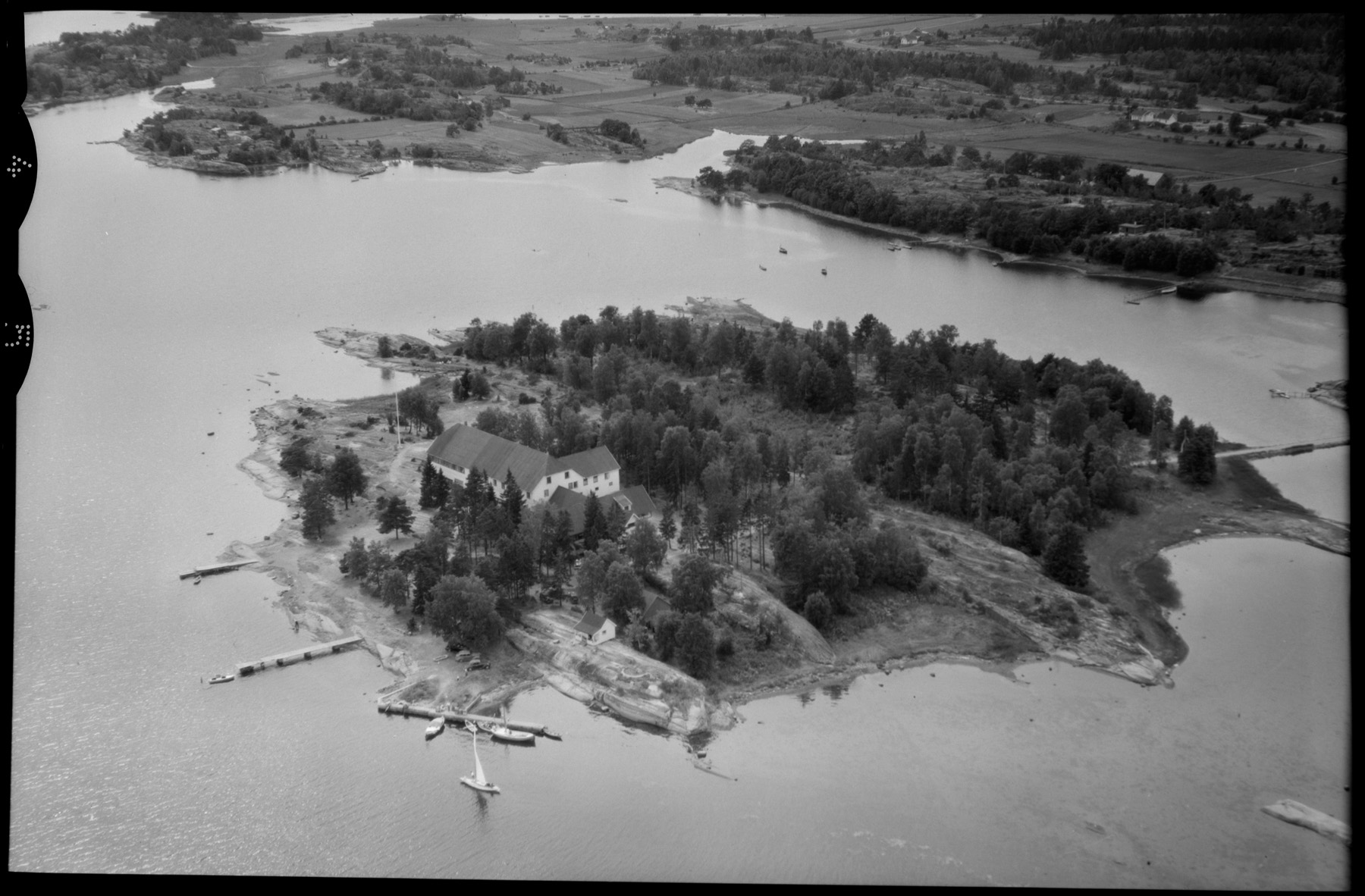
- View of Granholmen in 1947
- Interactive map of the island

Geography
- Location: Vestfold, Norway
- Coordinates: 59.08807°N 10.2208°E
- Area: 5 km^{2} (1.9 sq mi)

Administration
- Norway
- County: Vestfold
- Municipality: Sandefjord Municipality

Granholmen is an island in the Sandefjordsfjord in Sandefjord Municipality in Vestfold county, Norway. It is located about 5 kilometres (3.1 mi) south of the city center of Sandefjord and about 2.5 kilometres (1.6 mi) to the north of the village of Hem in neighboring Larvik Municipality. The 5-hectare (12-acre) island has a campground, a cafe, kiosk, pub, and soccer field, along with grasslands and sandy beaches. It lies along county road 303 and is connected to the mainland by a bridge. A hotel was constructed on the island in 1902 when the island was purchased by Anton Johansen. He also established a restaurant at Granholmen. Ferries such as Fjeldvik, Huvik II, Laugen, Expedit, and Varden transferred visitors to the island.

The island was home to a farm with cows until 1890, and later one of Norway's largest wooden buildings with a restaurant and hotel. It also housed a school for Germans during World War II and was the location of the Norwegian championship in boxing in 1933 and chess in 1935. It was also previously a destination for steamboats carrying passengers.

During the German occupation of World War II, Granholmen Hotel was housing NS Ungdomsfylking, the youth organization of the fascist party Nasjonal Samling. After the war, Stephan Trøber of Sarpsborg purchased the island and opened Granholmen Turisthotell. This hotel burnt down on 4 September 1950, and all ten hotel guests were brought to safety. The island was purchased by Sandar Municipality the following year. The island was previously named Flatskjær but was given the name Granholmen in 1887 due to its many spruce trees.

Today, the island is used for a variety of outdoor activities, including sailing, kayaking, rowing, camping, hiking, swimming, boccia, soccer, and more. Granholmen is one of 124 islands within Sandefjord Municipality.

A new swimming rig and ramp were installed at Granholmen Campground in 2020. Granholmen's sandy beaches are popular for swimming and one of few beaches on the western shores of the Sandefjordsfjord.

== History ==
After its expansion in 1931, the restaurant on Granholmen was considered the largest in the Oslo Fjord. A fire on the night before 4 September 1950, destroyed all buildings, and the 8-10 guests were brought to safety. The year after, the island was purchased by the city to use for recreational purposes. Granholmen was home to a hotel, restaurant, and in 1933, the first Norwegian Championship (NM) in boxing was held on the island. The island was also home to a sandy beach and a jumping tower, where visitors came to swim, sunbathe and use their boats.

== Notable people ==
- Henrik Dannstrøm, an entrepreneur

== See also ==
- Nattholmen
- List of islands of Norway
