= Vestfold District Court =

First-instance law court in Norway

- Vestfold tingrett
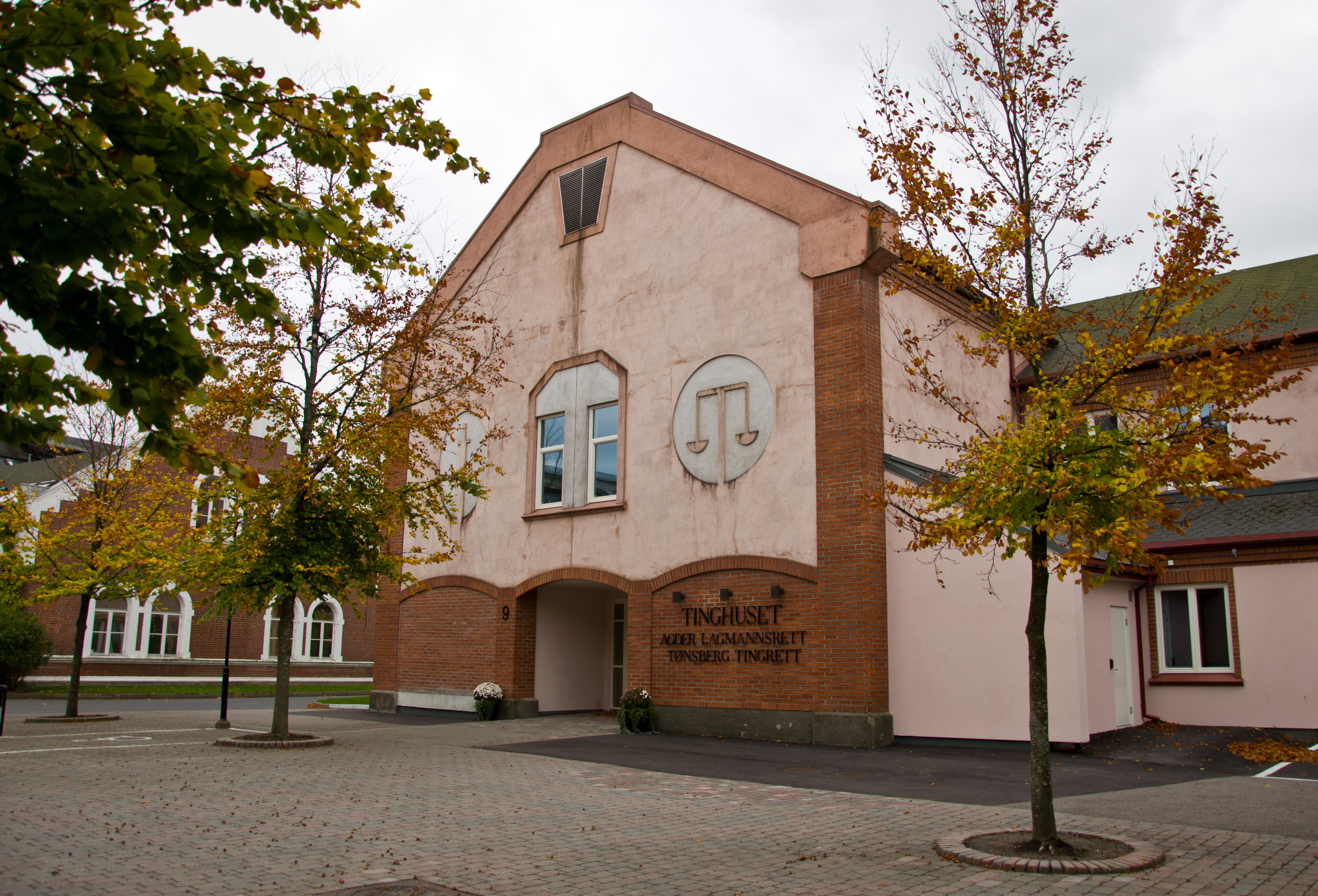
- Old courthouse in Tønsberg
- 59°16′18″N 10°24′42″E
- Established: 1 January 2019
- Jurisdiction: Vestfold, Norway
- Location: Tønsberg, Horten, and Larvik
- Coordinates: 59°16′18″N 10°24′42″E
- Appeals to: Agder Court of Appeal
- Website: Official website

Vestfold District Court (Norwegian: Vestfold tingrett) is a district court located in Vestfold county, Norway. This court is based in Tønsberg. The court is subordinate to the Agder Court of Appeal. The court serves all six municipalities in Vestfold county (Færder, Holmestrand, Horten, Larvik, Sandefjord, and Tønsberg).

The court is led by a chief judge (sorenskriver) and several other judges. The court is a court of first instance. Its judicial duties are mainly to settle criminal cases and to resolve civil litigation as well as bankruptcy. The administration and registration tasks of the court include death registration, issuing certain certificates, performing duties of a notary public, and officiating civil wedding ceremonies. Cases from this court are heard by a combination of professional judges and lay judges.

== History ==
This court was established on 1 January 2019 after the old Larvik District Court, Nordre Vestfold District Court, Sandefjord District Court and Tønsberg District Court were all merged into one court. The new district court system continued to use the four courthouses from the predecessor courts as follows:

- The courthouse in Larvik accepted cases from Larvik Municipality.
- The courthouse in Sandefjord accepted cases from Sandefjord Municipality.
- The courthouse in Horten accepted cases from Horten Municipality and Holmestrand Municipality.
- The courthouse in Tønsberg accepted cases from Tønsberg Municipality and Færder Municipality.

On 17 December 2020, the courthouse in Sandefjord was permanently closed and cases from Sandefjord Municipality were reassigned to go to the courthouse in Larvik. During the summer of 2025, the courthouses in Larvik, Horten, and Tønsberg were closed as a brand new courthouse in Tønsberg was completed. Starting in August 2025, all cases for the Vestfold District Court were held in the new Tønsberg Courthouse.
