= Sandefjordsfjord =

Fjord in Vestfold, Norway

Sandefjordsfjorden
- Sandefjorden
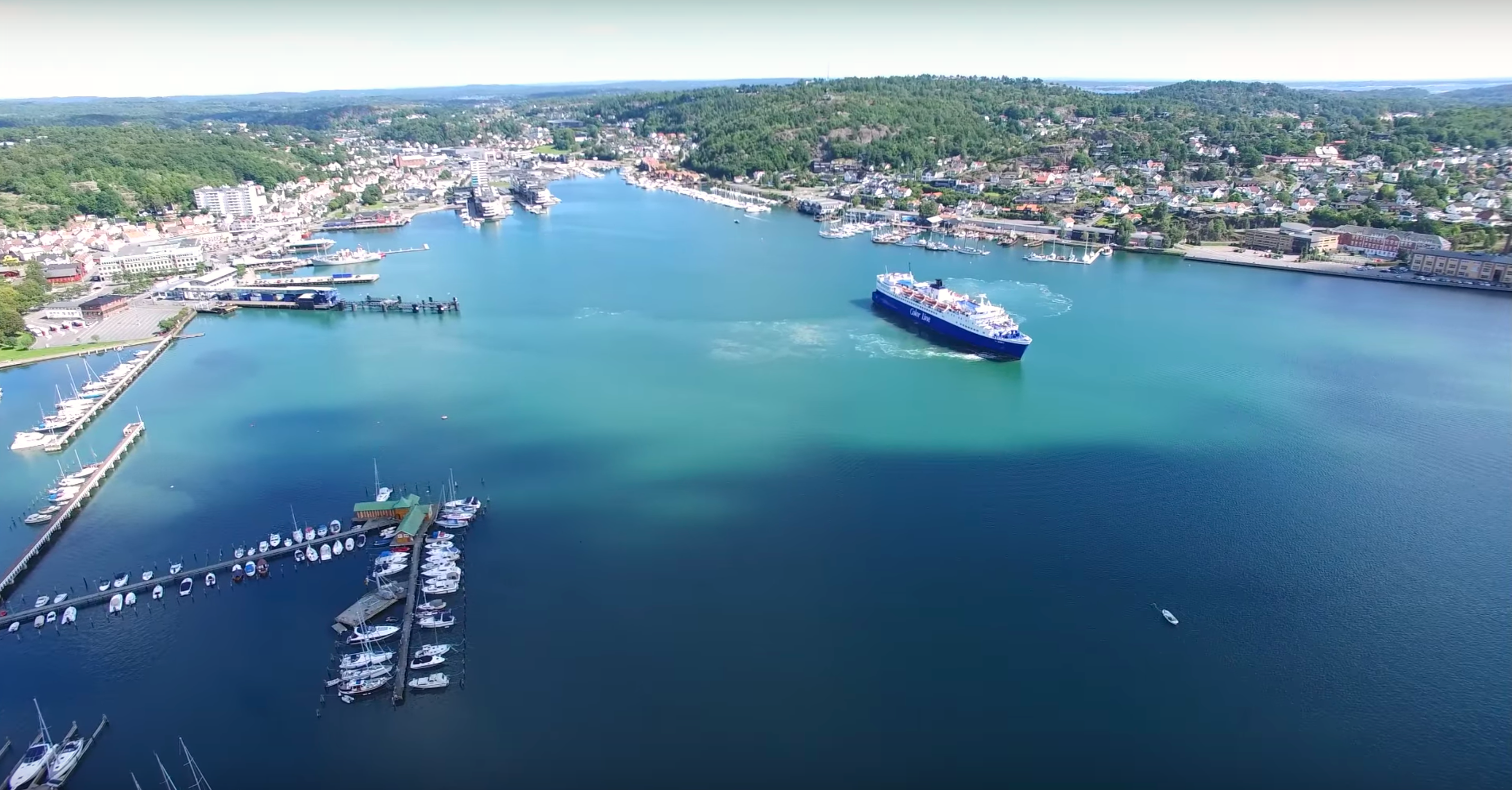
- View of the head of the fjord
- Interactive map of the fjord
- Location: Vestfold county, Norway
- Coordinates: 59.08139°N 10.24°E
- Type: Fjord
- Primary outflows: Ytre Oslofjord
- Basin countries: Norway
- Max. length: 9 kilometres (5.6 mi)
- Settlements: Sandefjord

Sandefjordsfjorden or sometimes simply Sandefjorden is a 9-kilometre (5.6 mi) long fjord in Sandefjord Municipality in Vestfold county, Norway. It is located west of the mainland, south of the town of Sandefjord, and east of the Vesterøya peninsula. The Sandefjordsfjord is the longest of the four fjords located in Sandefjord Municipality. It is a wide fjord which gradually shrinks northbound towards the city harbor. It has a number of small islands located in the fjord including Granholmen.

== Name ==
The name dates to Sverris saga from 1200 AD. Its name derives from the name Sandar which, originally, was that of the farm just outside the present town centre, and which for hundreds of years was the vicarage of the Sandeherred prestegjeld, also known as Sande – hence the Sande-fjord. As the town came into existence, the name gradually came to be applied to it, and the need for an expression to allow references to the fjord, as opposed to the town, emerged. Sandefjordsfjord was the pleonastic result. The name Sandarfjorden was suggested during the merger of Sandar Municipality-Sandefjord Municipality in the 1960s, but its current name was ultimately kept.

== See also ==
- List of Norwegian fjords
