= Vesterøy Church =

Church in Vestfold, Norway

- Vesterøy kirke
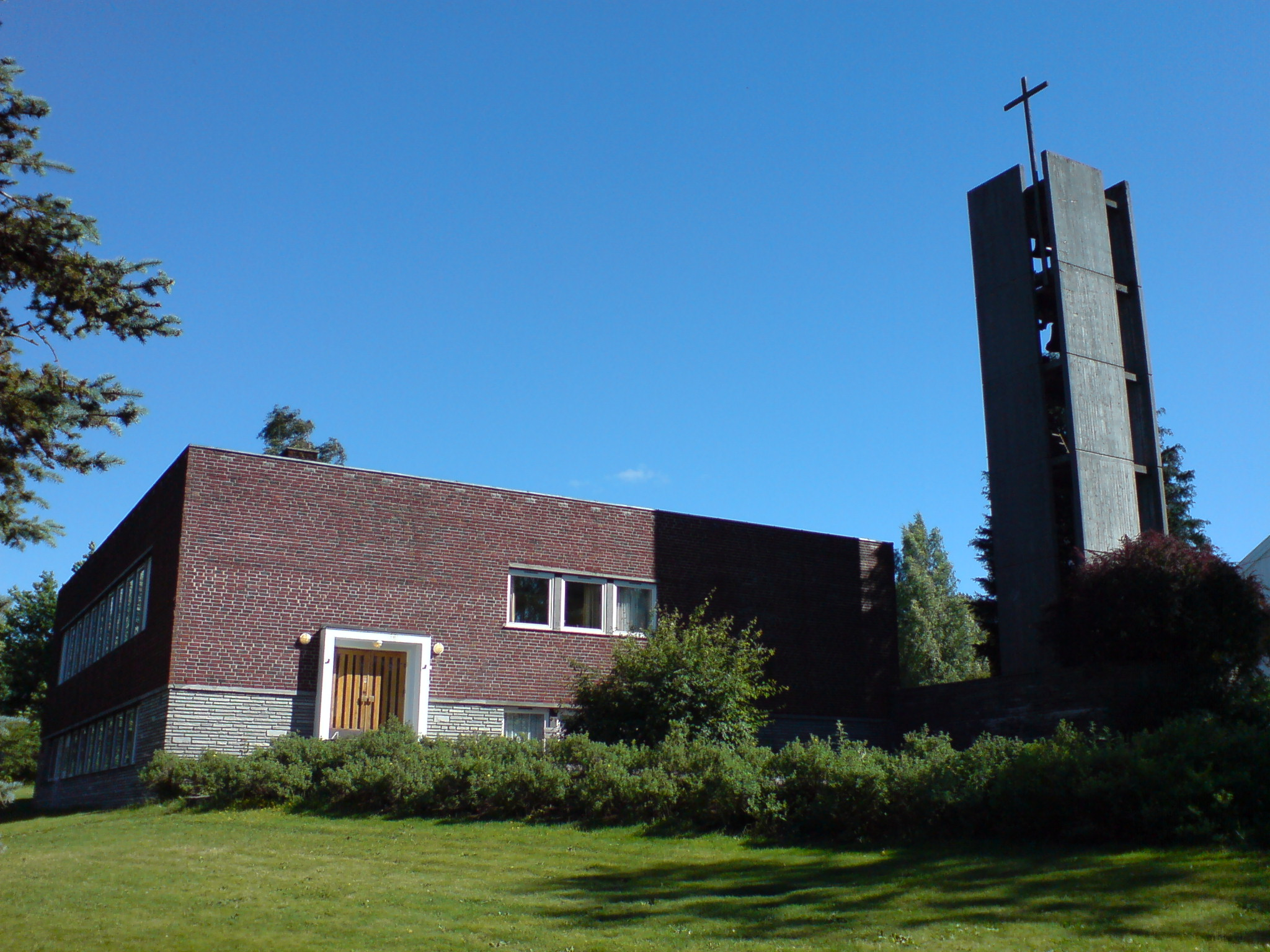
- View of the church
- Vesterøy Church
- 59°07′11″N 10°14′24″E
- Location: Sandefjord Municipality, Vestfold
- Country: Norway
- Denomination: Church of Norway
- Churchmanship: Evangelical Lutheran

History
- Status: Parish church
- Founded: 1967
- Consecrated: 15 June 1967

Architecture
- Functional status: Active
- Architect: Elisabeth Breen Fidjestøl
- Architectural type: Rectangular
- Completed: 1967 (59 years ago)

Specifications
- Capacity: 250
- Materials: Brick

Administration
- Diocese: Tunsberg
- Deanery: Sandefjord prosti
- Parish: Vesterøy
- Norwegian Cultural Heritage Site
- Type: Church
- Status: Not protected
- ID: 85812

Vesterøy Church (Norwegian: Vesterøy kirke) is a parish church of the Church of Norway in Sandefjord Municipality in Vestfold county, Norway. It is located on the Vesterøya peninsula in the southern part of the city of Sandefjord. It is the church for the Vesterøy parish which is part of the Sandefjord prosti (deanery) in the Diocese of Tunsberg. The red brick church was built in a rectangular design in 1967 using plans drawn up by the architect Elisabeth Breen Fidjestøl. The church seats about 250 people.

== History ==
In the 1950s, the parish began planning for a new church to serve the southern part of the old Sandar Municipality (which merged with Sandefjord in 1968). A plot of land was purchased in 1954. The church was constructed during the 1960s and it was consecrated on 15 June 1967. The rectangular brick building was actually the first stage of construction which included a multi-purpose church hall and some smaller offices and classrooms. The second phase was to be a large sanctuary, but the second phase has not yet been built. The altarpiece is a wooden mosaic made by Ingrid Nordby Søyland and bears the title "The Cross in our world".

== See also ==
- List of churches in Tunsberg
