= Sandefjord District Court =

Former district court in Norway

- Sandefjord tingrett
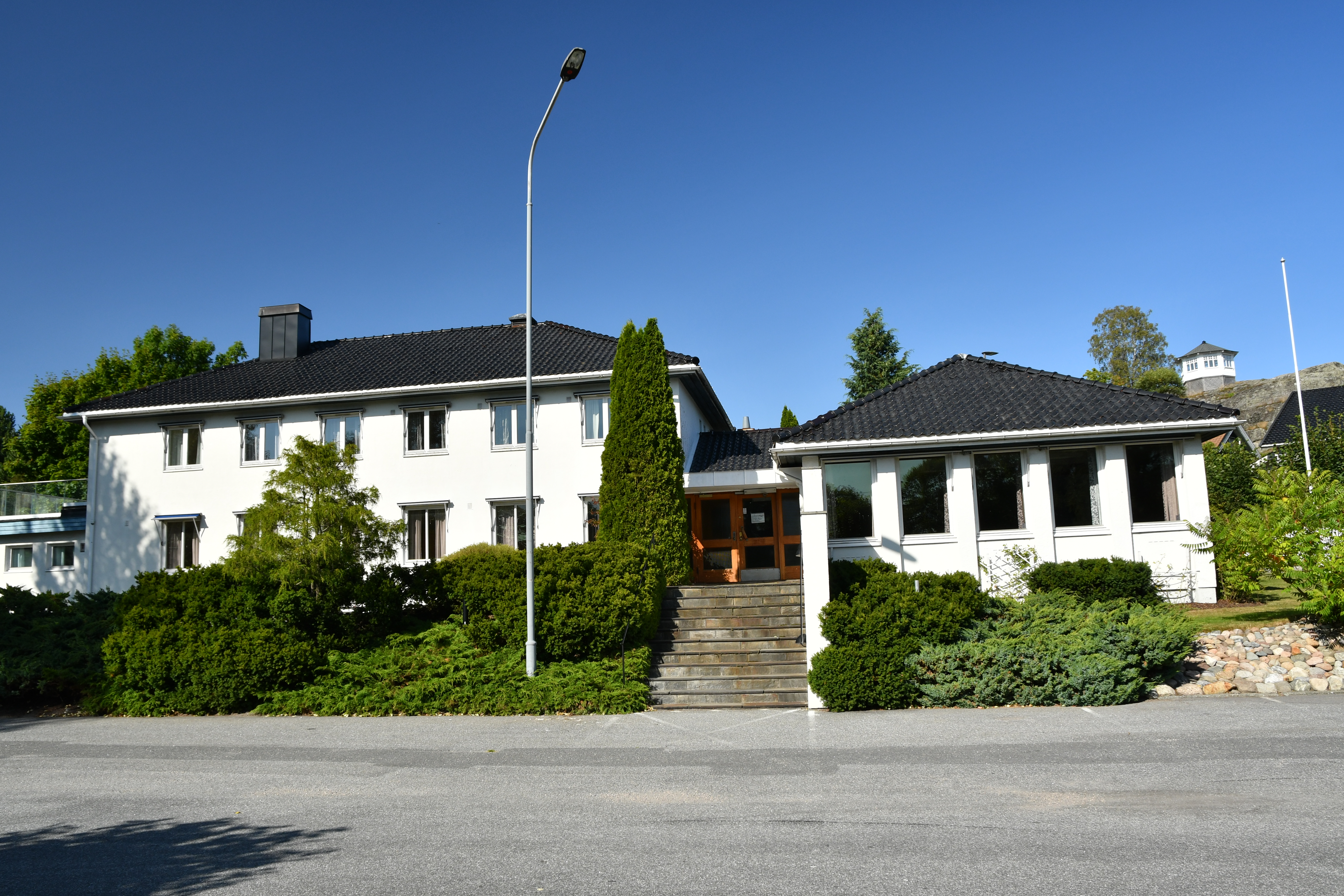
- Courthouse in Sandefjord
- 59°08′08″N 10°13′34″E
- Established: 24 April 1936
- Dissolved: 1 January 2019
- Jurisdiction: Southern Vestfold
- Location: Sandefjord, Norway
- Coordinates: 59°08′08″N 10°13′34″E
- Appeals to: Agder Court of Appeal

Division map
- Historic Vestfold county court jurisdictions: Larvik District Court Sandefjord District Court Tønsberg District Court Nordre Vestfold District Court Drammen District Court

Sandefjord District Court (Norwegian: Sandefjord tingrett) was a district court in Vestfold county, Norway. The court was based in Sandefjord. The court existed until 2019. It had jurisdiction over Sandefjord Municipality. Cases from this court could be appealed to Agder Court of Appeal.

The court was a court of first instance. Its judicial duties were mainly to settle criminal cases and to resolve civil litigation as well as bankruptcy. The administration and registration tasks of the court included death registration, issuing certain certificates, performing duties of a notary public, and officiating civil wedding ceremonies. Cases from this court were heard by a combination of professional judges and lay judges.

== History ==
This court was established on 24 April 1936 as the Sandar District Court (later changed to Sandefjord District Court) and it originally had jurisdiction over the town of Sandefjord and the neighboring Andebu Municipality and Sandar Municipality.

On 6 June 1952, the area of Andebu Municipality was moved to the new Jarlsberg District Court. In 1968, Sandar Municipality was merged into the town of Sandefjord and consequently the court's name was changed to Sandefjord District Court.

On 1 January 2019, Sandefjord District Court was merged with the Nordre Vestfold District Court, Tønsberg District Court, and Larvik District Court to create the new Vestfold District Court.
