= Larvik District Court =

Former district court in Norway

- Larvik tingrett
- 59°03′11″N 10°01′32″E
- Established: 30 August 1825
- Dissolved: 1 January 2019
- Jurisdiction: Southwestern Vestfold
- Location: Larvik, Norway
- Coordinates: 59°03′11″N 10°01′32″E
- Appeals to: Agder Court of Appeal

Division map
- Historic Vestfold county court jurisdictions: Larvik District Court Sandefjord District Court Tønsberg District Court Nordre Vestfold District Court Drammen District Court

Larvik District Court (Norwegian: Larvik tingrett) was a district court in western Vestfold county, Norway. The court was based in Larvik. The court existed until 2019. It had jurisdiction over Larvik Municipality. Cases from this court could be appealed to Agder Court of Appeal.

The court was a court of first instance. Its judicial duties were mainly to settle criminal cases and to resolve civil litigation as well as bankruptcy. The administration and registration tasks of the court included death registration, issuing certain certificates, performing duties of a notary public, and officiating civil wedding ceremonies. Cases from this court were heard by a combination of professional judges and lay judges.

== History ==
The court was originally established on 30 August 1825 and it originally included the city of Larvik plus the surrounding areas of Tjøme, Sandar, Tjølling, Brunlanes, and Hedrum.

On 17 July 1847, Lardal Municipality was moved from the Nordre Jarlsberg District Court to the Larvik District Court and on 20 February 1849, Tjøme Municipality was moved from this court to the Søndre Jarlsberg District Court. On 24 April 1936, the new Sandar District Court was created, moving Sandar and Sandefjord to that new court.

On 1 January 2019, Larvik District Court was merged with the Nordre Vestfold District Court, Sandefjord District Court, and Tønsberg District Court to create the new Vestfold District Court.
