= Nordre Vestfold District Court =

Former district court in Norway

- Nordre Vestfold tingrett
- 59°24′22″N 10°28′51″E
- Established: 1 January 2005
- Dissolved: 1 January 2019
- Jurisdiction: North/Central Vestfold
- Location: Horten, Norway
- Coordinates: 59°24′22″N 10°28′51″E
- Appeals to: Agder Court of Appeal

Division map
- Historic Vestfold county court jurisdictions: Larvik District Court Sandefjord District Court Tønsberg District Court Nordre Vestfold District Court Drammen District Court

Nordre Vestfold District Court (Norwegian: Nordre Vestfold tingrett) was a district court in north-central Vestfold county, Norway. The court was based in Horten. The court existed until 2019. It had jurisdiction over the municipalities of Horten, Re, and Holmestrand Municipality. Cases from this court could be appealed to Agder Court of Appeal.

The court was a court of first instance. Its judicial duties were mainly to settle criminal cases and to resolve civil litigation as well as bankruptcy. The administration and registration tasks of the court included death registration, issuing certain certificates, performing duties of a notary public, and officiating civil wedding ceremonies. Cases from this court were heard by a combination of professional judges and lay judges.

== History ==
The Nordre Vestfold District Court was established on 1 January 2005 when the Horten District Court and Holmestrand District Court were closed and merged together to form the new Nordre Vestfold District Court. The new court had jurisdiction over Horten Municipality and Re Municipality from the old Horten court and Holmestrand Municipality and Hof Municipality from the old Holmestrand court (Sande and Svelvik municipalities were transferred from the old Holmestrand court to the Drammen District Court).

On 1 January 2019, Nordre Vestfold District Court was merged with the Tønsberg District Court, Sandefjord District Court, and Larvik District Court to create the new Vestfold District Court.
