= Sandar Church =

Church in Vestfold, Norway

- Sandar kirke
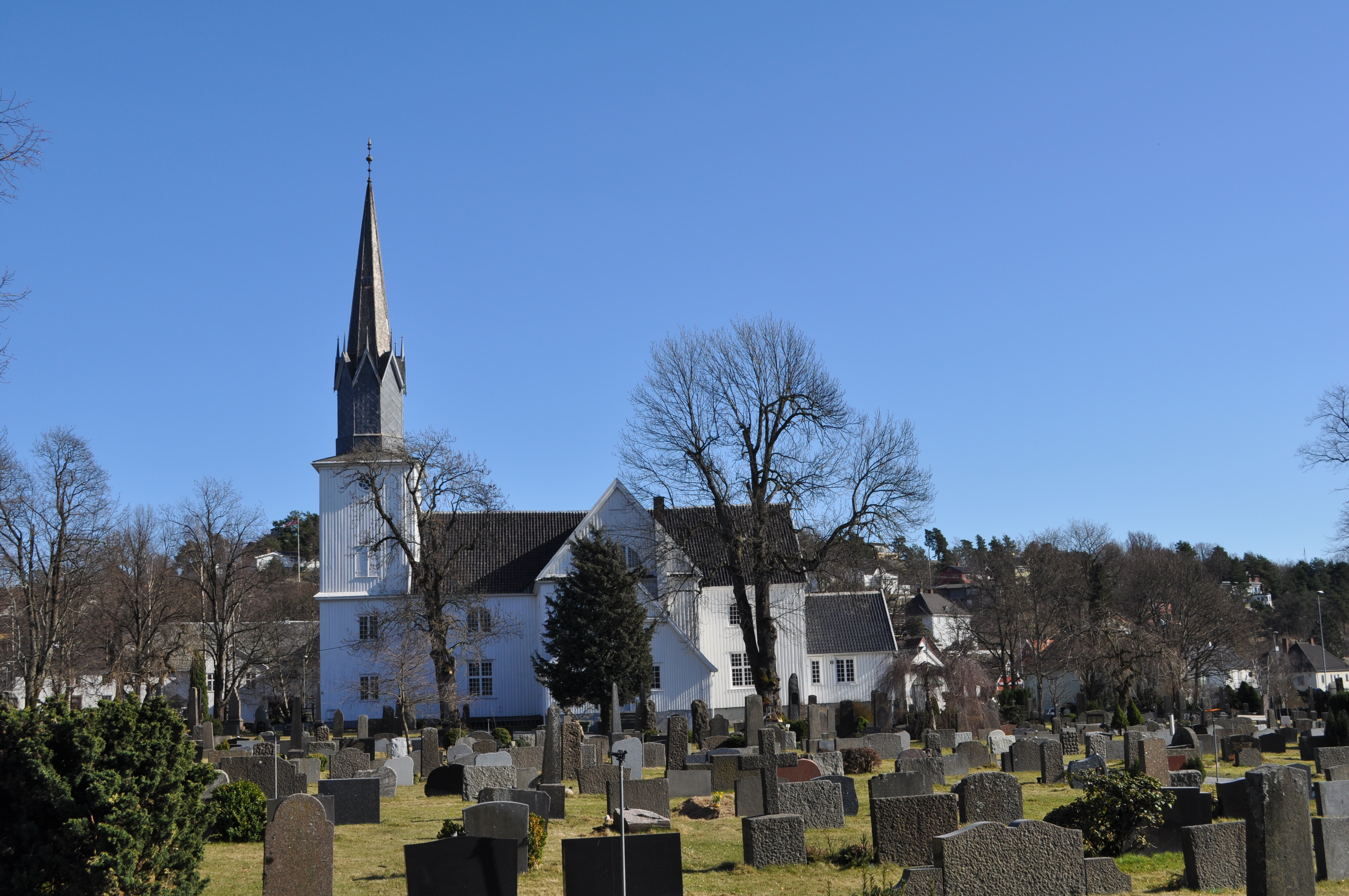
- View of the church
- Sandar Church
- 59°08′03″N 10°13′35″E
- Location: Sandefjord Municipality, Vestfold
- Country: Norway
- Denomination: Church of Norway
- Previous denomination: Catholic Church
- Churchmanship: Evangelical Lutheran

History
- Former name(s): Sandeherred kirke Frederiks kirke
- Status: Parish church
- Founded: 1100s
- Consecrated: 15 Aug 1792

Architecture
- Functional status: Active
- Architect: Hans Christian Lind
- Architectural type: Cruciform
- Style: Style Louis XV
- Completed: 1792 (234 years ago)

Specifications
- Capacity: 700
- Materials: Wood

Administration
- Diocese: Tunsberg
- Deanery: Sandefjord prosti
- Parish: Sandar
- Norwegian Cultural Heritage Site
- Type: Church
- Status: Automatically protected
- ID: 85374

Sandar Church (Norwegian: Sandar kirke) is a parish church of the Church of Norway in Sandefjord Municipality in Vestfold county, Norway. It is located in the city of Sandefjord. It is the church for the Sandar parish which is part of the Sandefjord prosti (deanery) in the Diocese of Tunsberg. The white, wooden church was built in a cruciform design in 1792 using plans drawn up by the architect Hans Christian Lind. The church seats about 700 people.

The present church was erected at the ruins of a mediaeval stone church from the 12th century. The current church was built in 1792 in the Style Louis XV. Sandar Church originally had a half-circle dome top, but the roofing was changed to the current spire in 1868. The church was the main church of the old Sandar Municipality for a long time until 1968 when it became part of Sandefjord Municipality. The church is located just 300 metres (980 ft) from the Sandefjord Church. The old church is only open for advertised church events.

== History ==
=== Medieval church ===
The earliest existing historical records of the church date back to the year 1345, but the church was not built that year. The first church on this site was a stone church that was likely built in the early 1100s. The old church was known as the Sancte Marie Et Sancti Olaui church because it was dedicated to Saint Mary and Saint Olaf, according to Bishop Eystein Aslaksson's book from 1398. The church was consecrated on Saint Faith Day October 6 (exact year unknown). Although it is most likely dedicated to St. Mary, the mother of Jesus, S. A. Sørensen claims in “Lidt om Sandeherred før i Tiden” (1872) that the church was dedicated to Saint Mary Magdalene.

During excavations in 1901-1902, researchers revealed the original stone church had apses and a tower. The church's rectangular nave measured 19.2 by 12 metres (63 ft × 39 ft), the choir measured 6.3 by 8 metres (21 ft × 26 ft), and there was a church porch with a bell tower above that measured 8.4 by 11.6 metres (28 ft × 38 ft). The total length of the church was estimated to have been 37.6 metres (123 ft). During these excavations, several coins from the early 1100s were recovered which supports the idea that the church was first built around that time. The original stone tower was removed in 1401, but it was later replaced several times. A wooden tower was installed in 1603 after the stone tower was removed for good.

After the Reformation, the church was known as the Sandeherred Church as it was the church for the Sandeherred parish. When the County of Larvik was established in 1671, the Count became the church owner. On 22 July 1745, lightning struck the church and caused quite a bit of damage to the church. By the latter half of the 18th century the church was described as being in poor condition. It was also too small for the growing population.

=== Current church ===
Count Christian Ahlefeldt-Laurvig decided that the church needed to be replaced with a larger, more modern church building. Construction plans ran into some problems, however, when the local farmers refused to carry out the compulsory work the Count imposed on them. However, they procured the timber, which was delivered in February 1790. In March of 1790, the old church was torn down. Work on the new wooden, cruciform building began soon after on the same site. The new church was framed and put under roof by the summer of 1791. Construction began under the leadership of a builder named Mr. Horn, who did most of the framing and structural work. He was dismissed after some time and replaced by Hans Christian Lind who finished the project. Lind is often credited especially for the interior work. During the construction process in 1791, Count Christian Ahlefeldt-Laurvig also died, and the title passed to his son Frederik. The church was completed in 1792 and it was consecrated on 15 August 1792 by bishop Christen Schmidt. The new church was named Frederiks Church in honor of King Frederik VI. The new Count Frederik almost went bankrupt in 1805, and the King took over most of the count's estate, but not the churches. Because of this, the churches in the area fell into disrepair.

In 1814, this church served as an election church (Norwegian: valgkirke). Together with more than 300 other parish churches across Norway, it was a polling station for elections to the 1814 Norwegian Constituent Assembly which wrote the Constitution of Norway. This was Norway's first national elections. Each church parish was a constituency that elected people called "electors" who later met together in each county to elect the representatives for the assembly that was to meet at Eidsvoll Manor later that year.

In 1816, an inspection was carried out and it concluded that the church was in a poor condition and some repairs were carried out. The Count continued to have unpaid bills and an insolvent estate, so then in 1835 Frederik Wilhelm Treschow took over ownership of the church and he eventually transferred ownership of the church to the parish.

Outside the church, there is a sculpture depicting priest and poet Magnus Brostrup Landstad. The Landstad sculpture is Norway's first statue made of hard rock. It was unveiled on 17 May 1928 and was made by sculptor Hans Holmen.

The church underwent a restoration for 13.4 million kr from November 2020 to July 2021. The restoration was funded by the municipality; the Norwegian Directorate for Cultural Heritage; and donations from private companies, individuals, and nonprofits.

== Media gallery ==
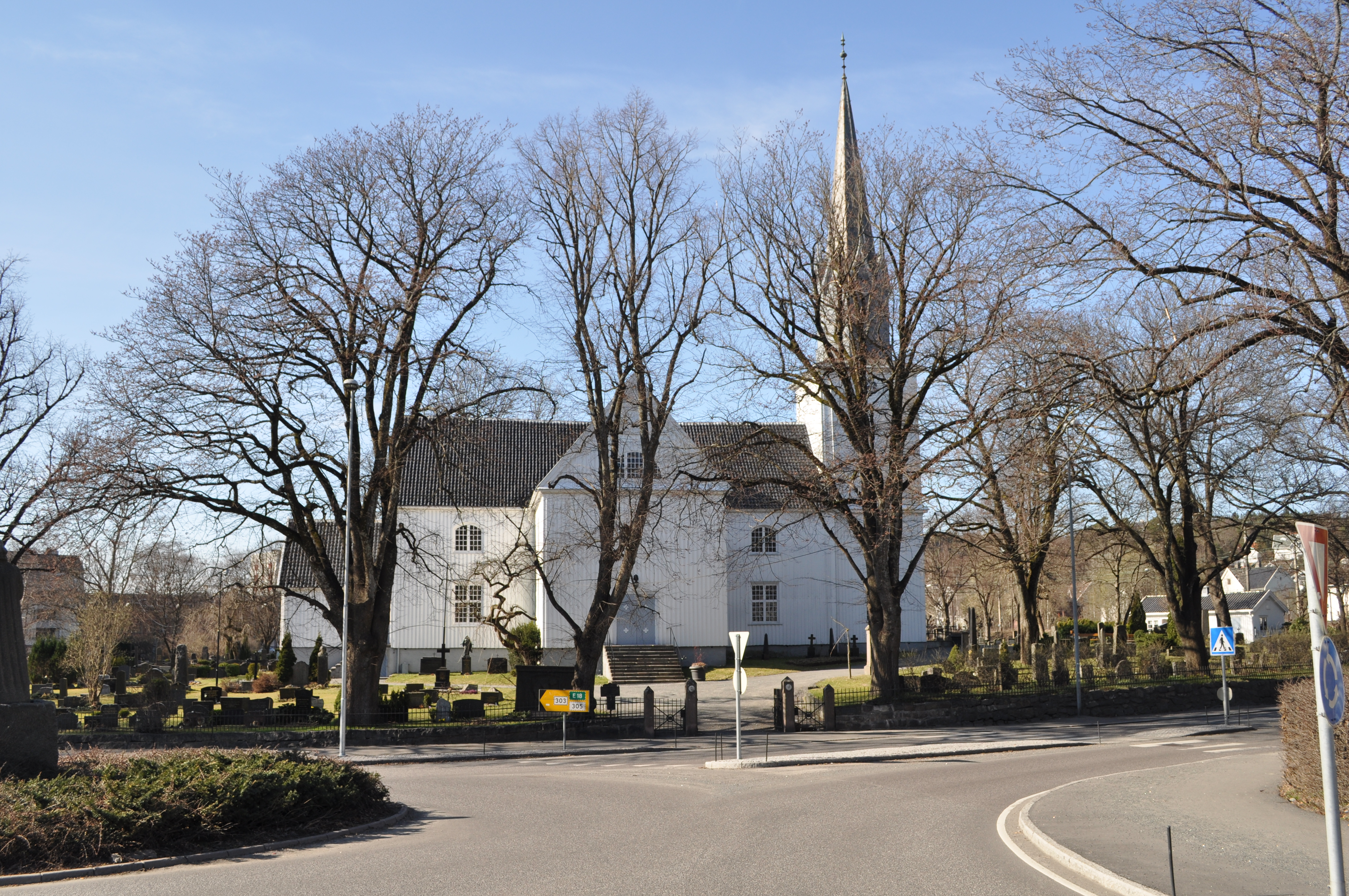

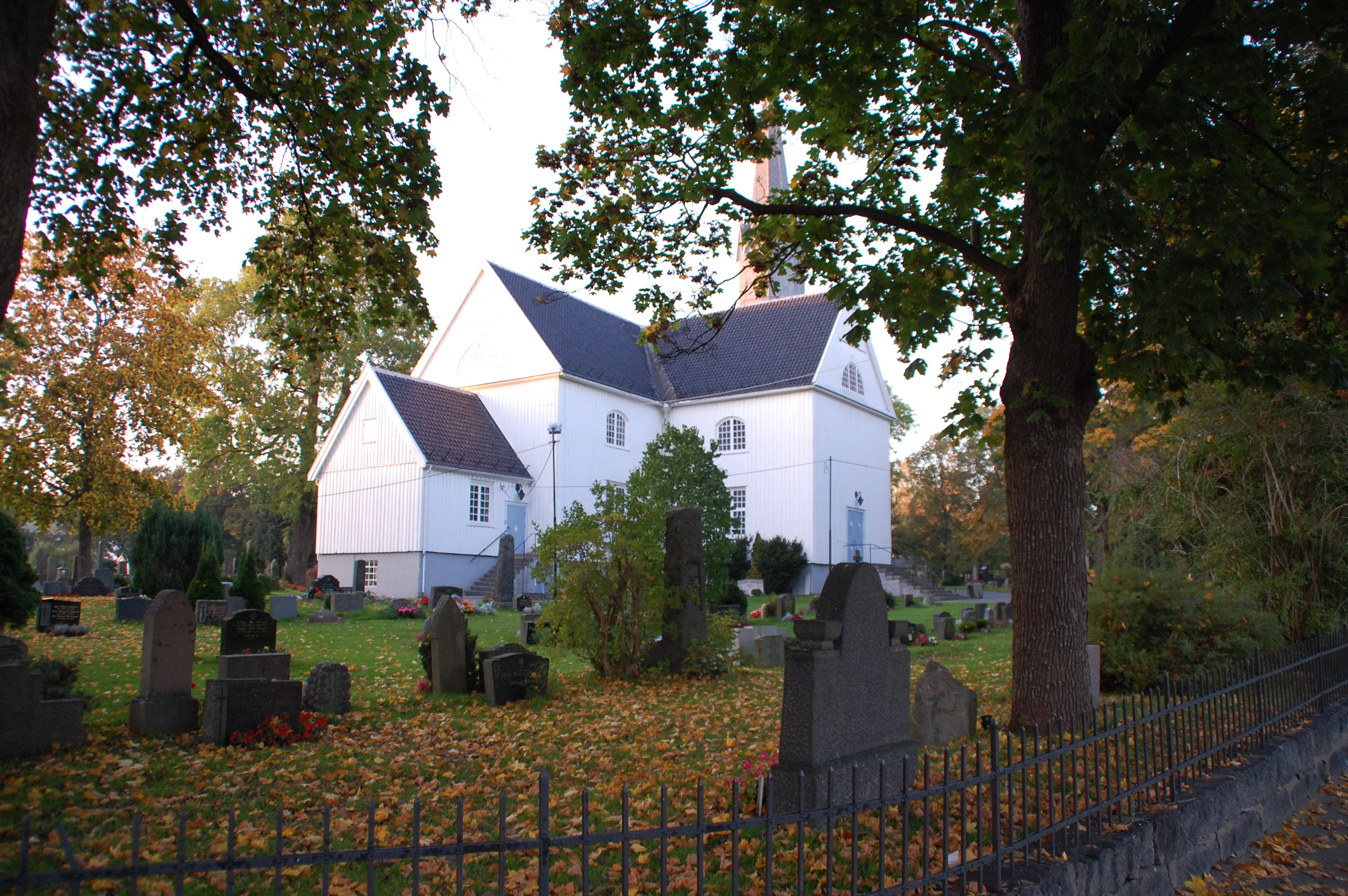

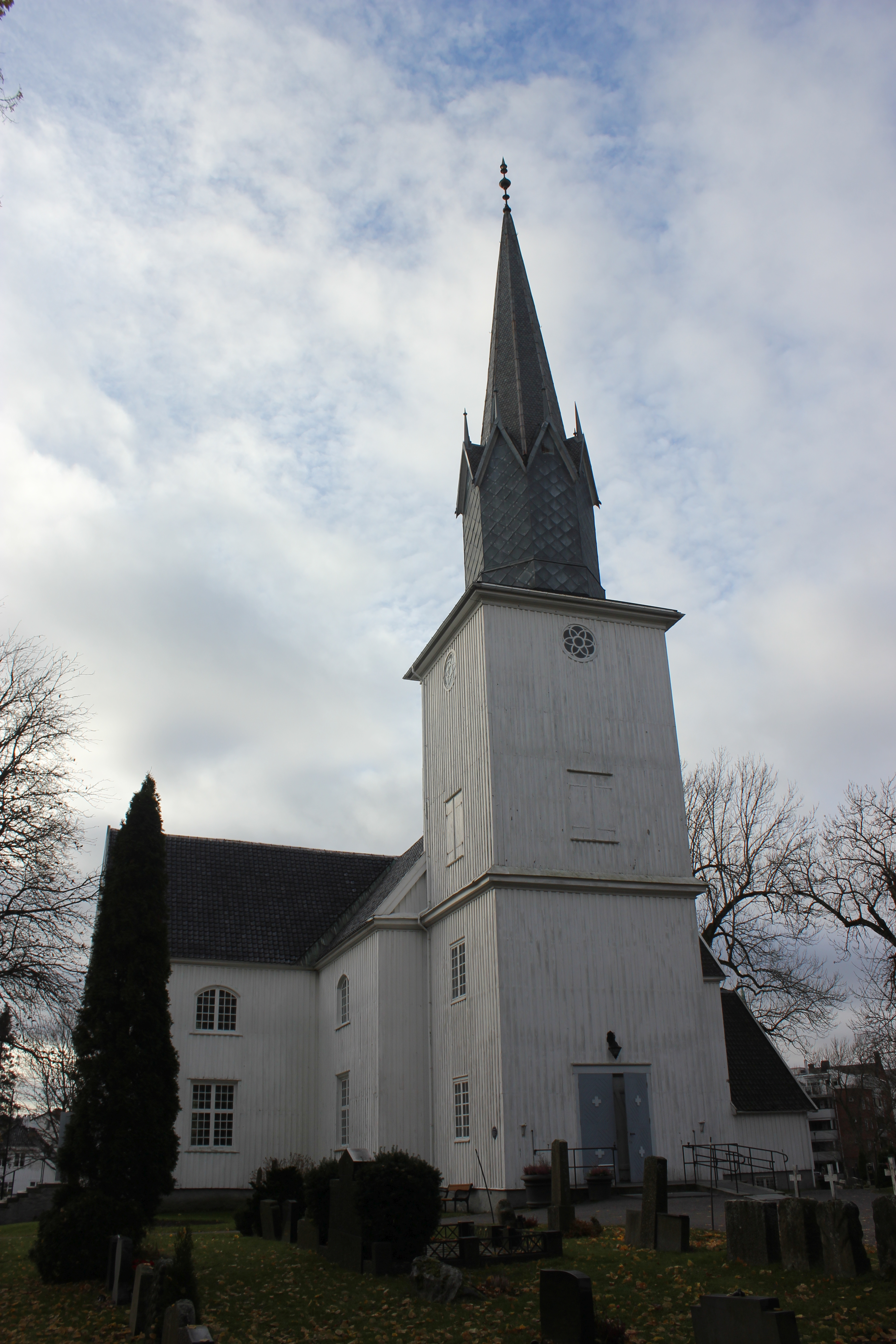

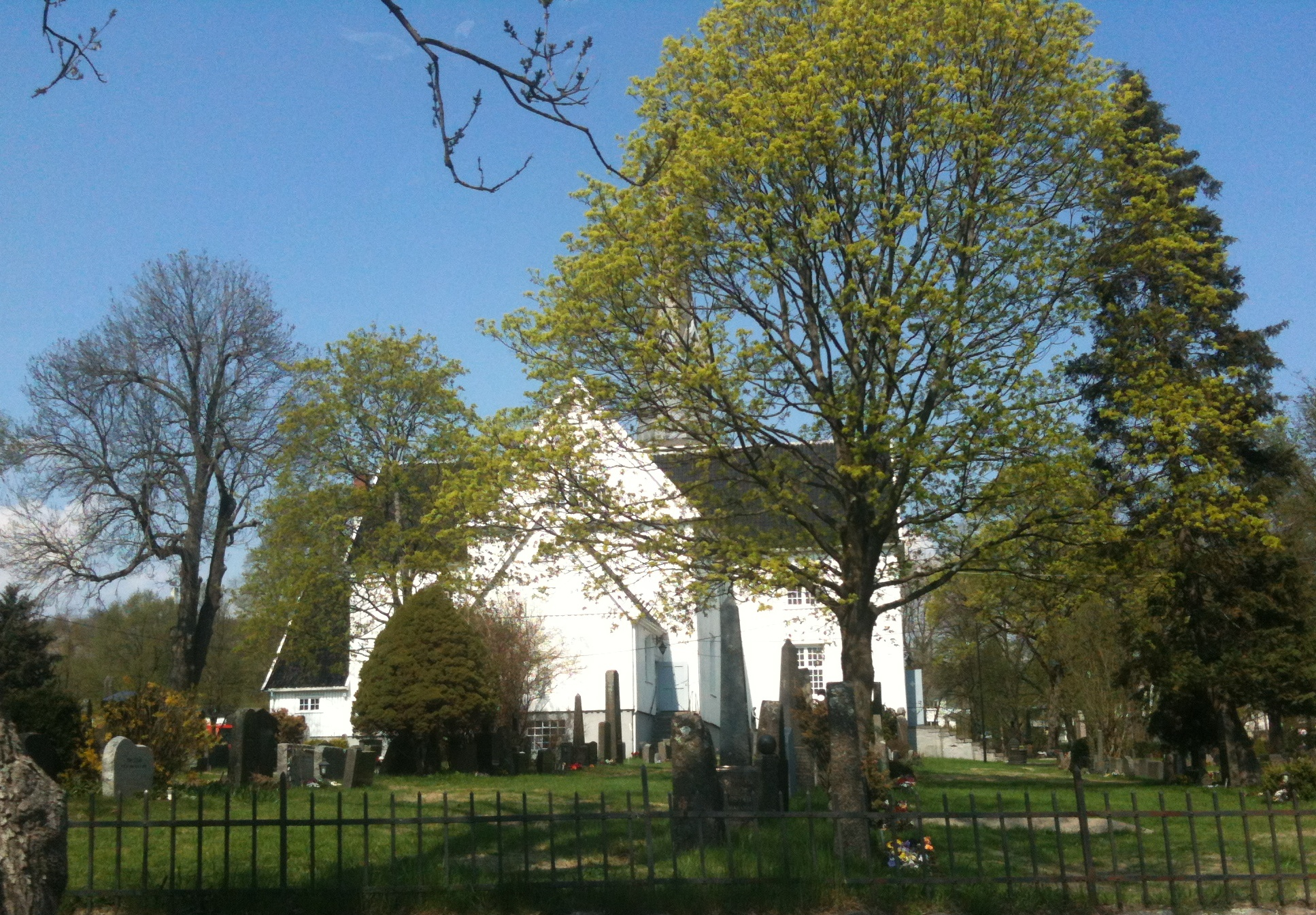

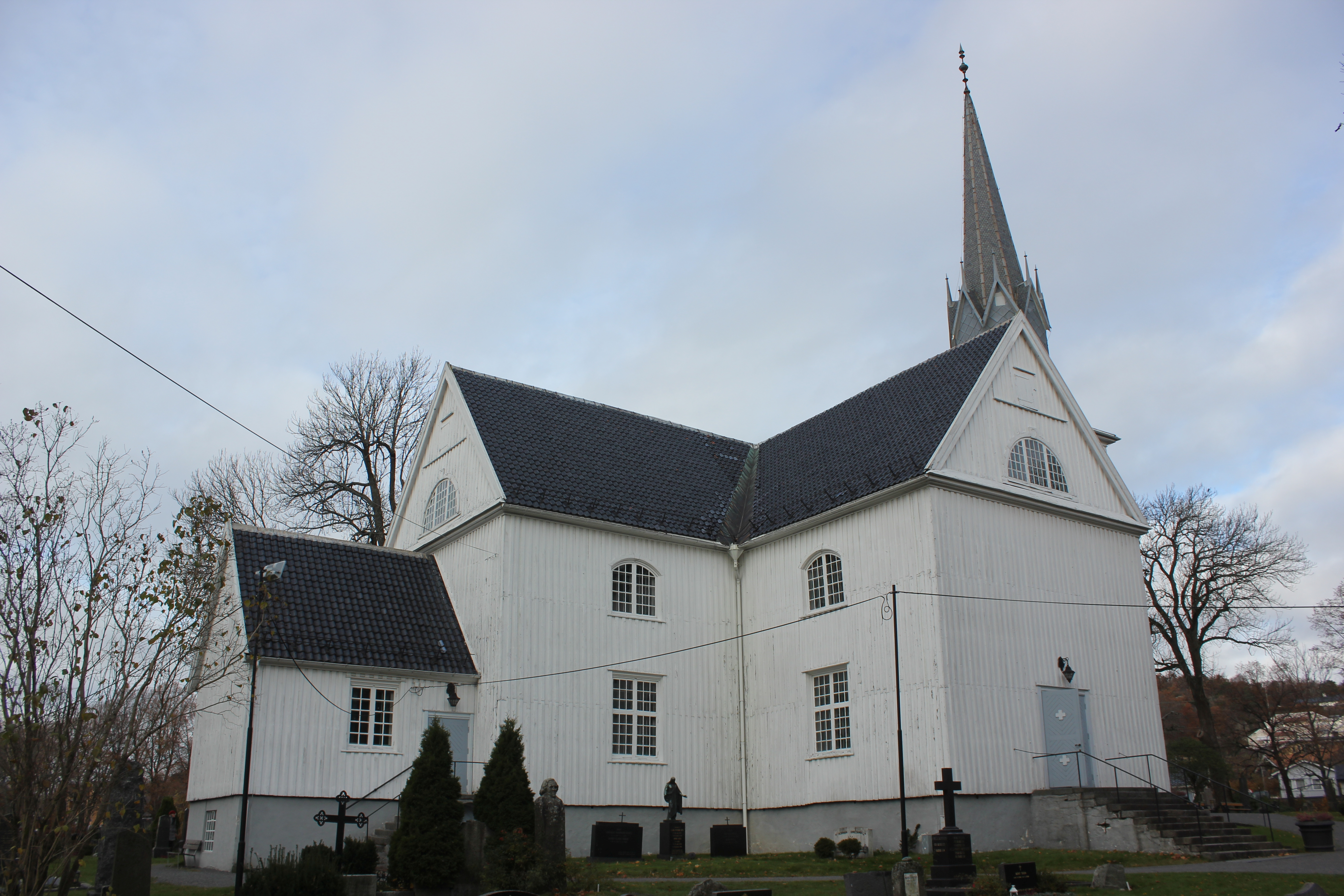

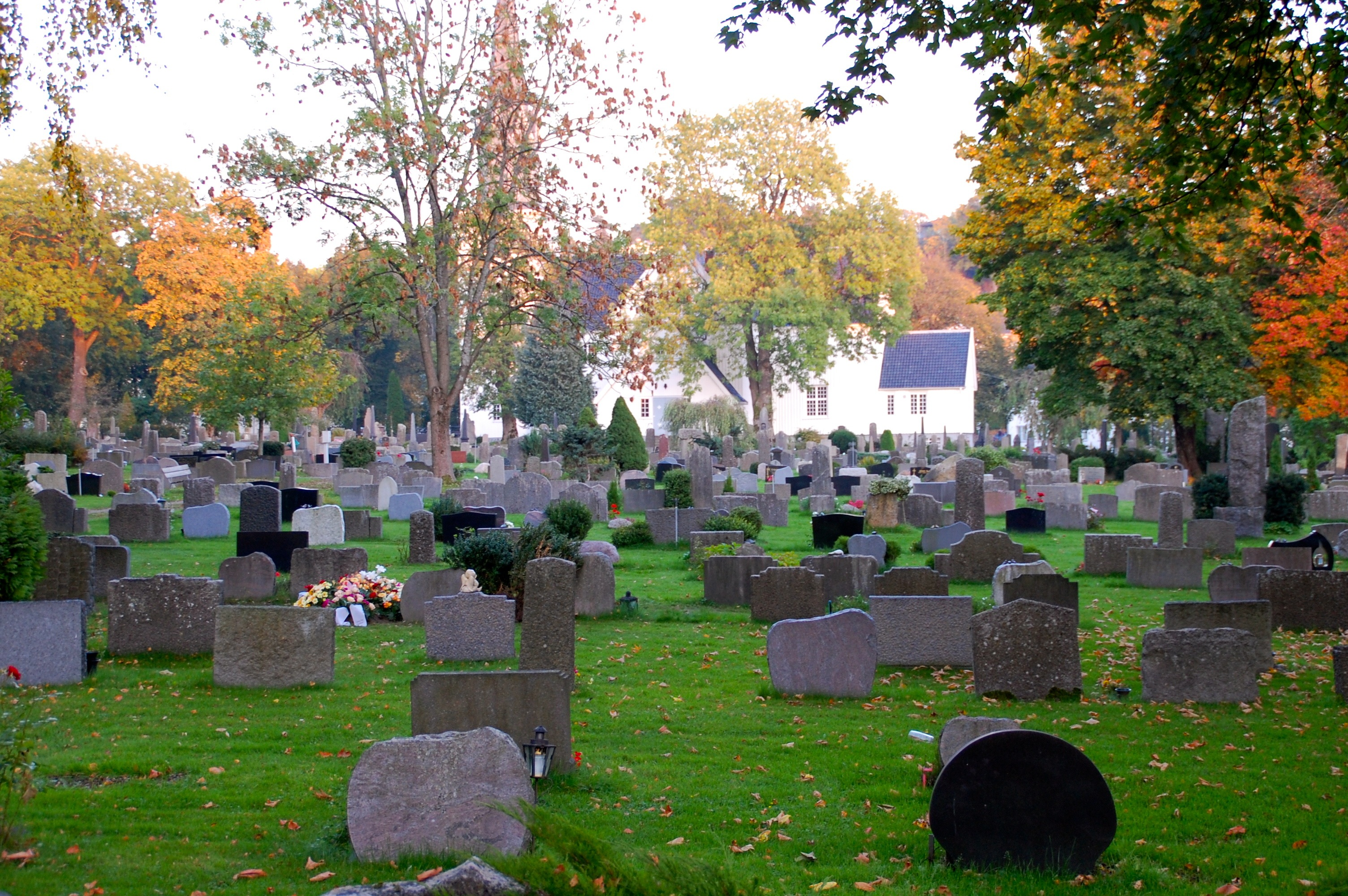

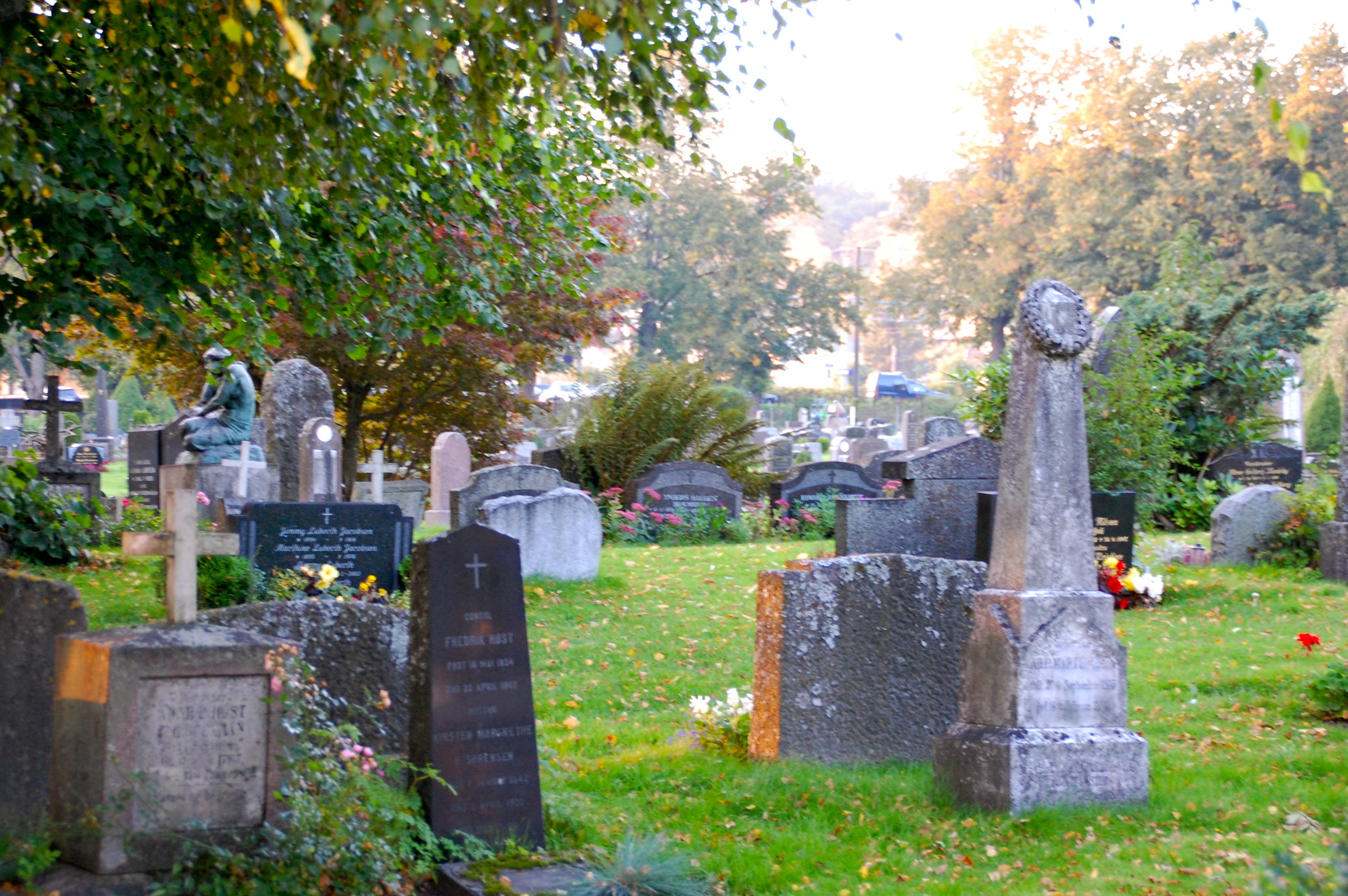

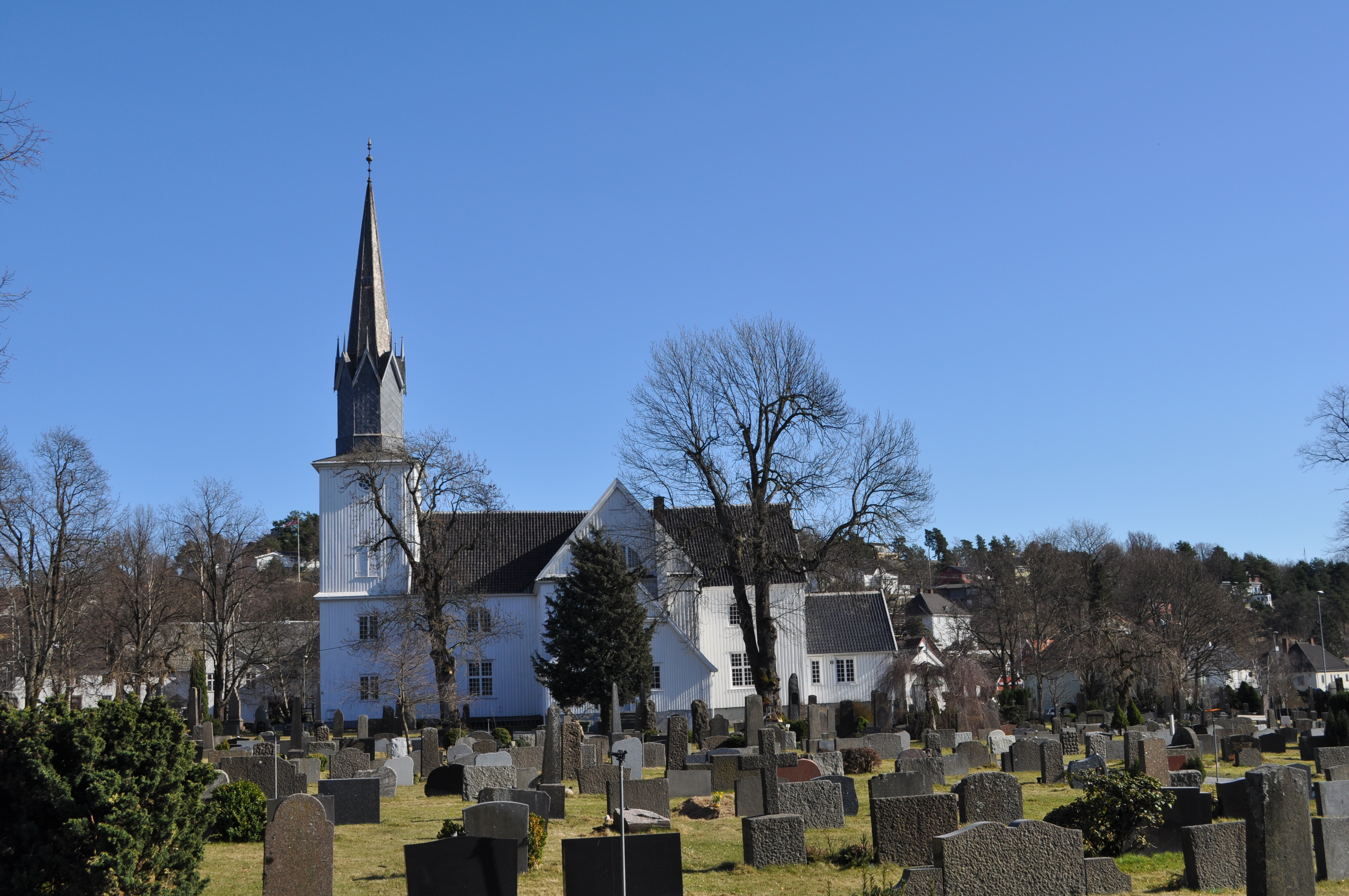

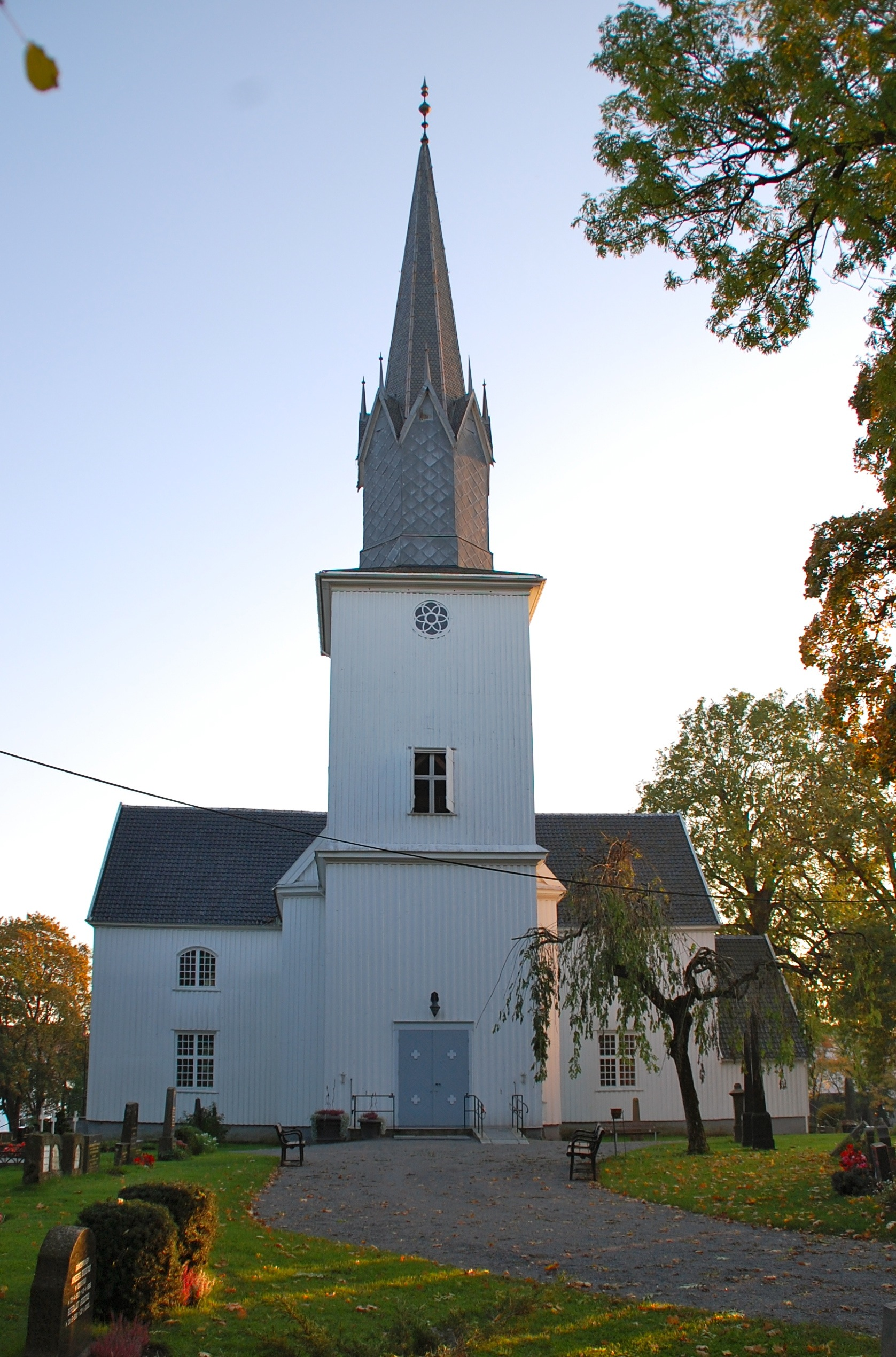

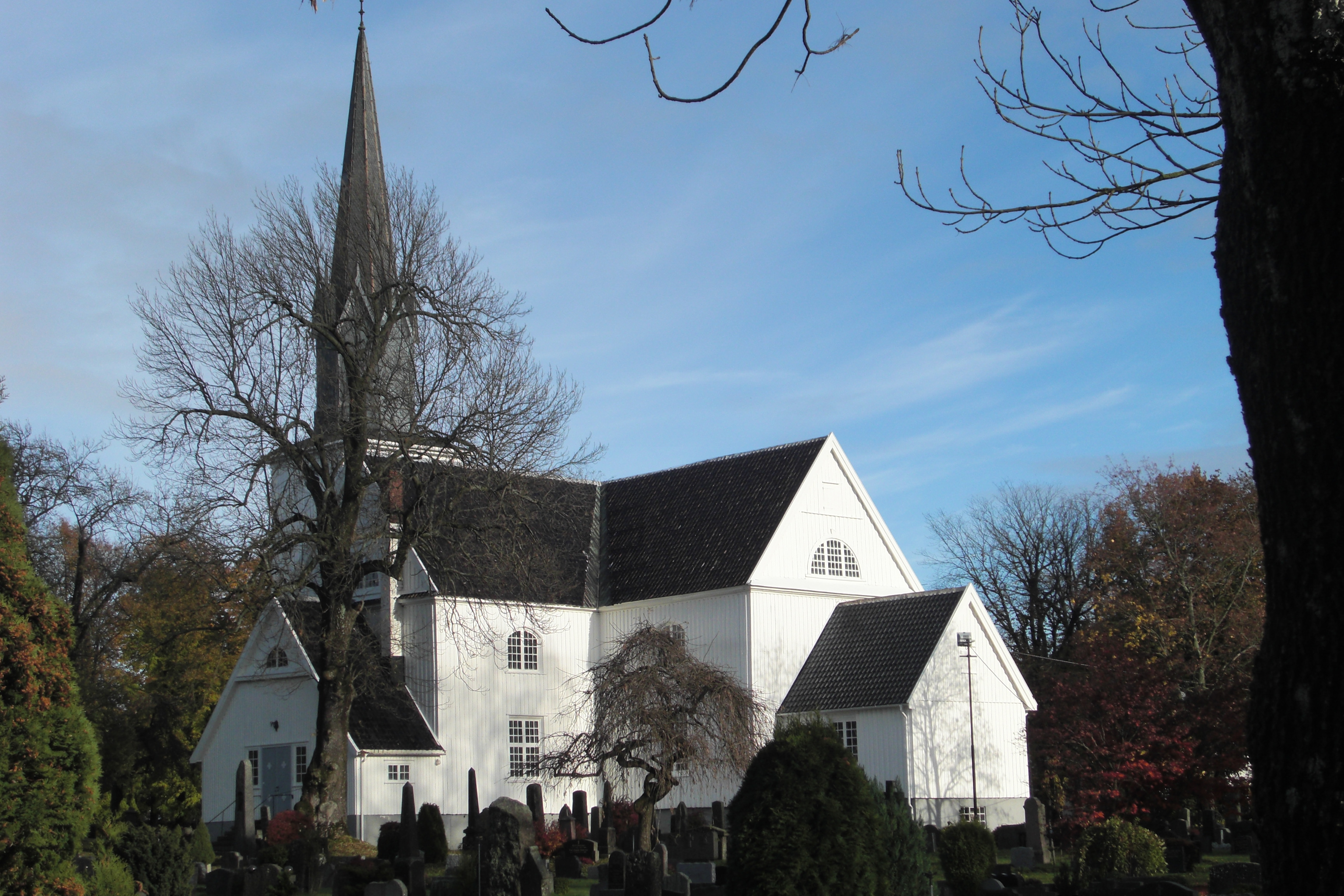

== See also ==
- List of churches in Tunsberg
