= Sandefjord Church =

Church in Vestfold, Norway

- Sandefjord kirke
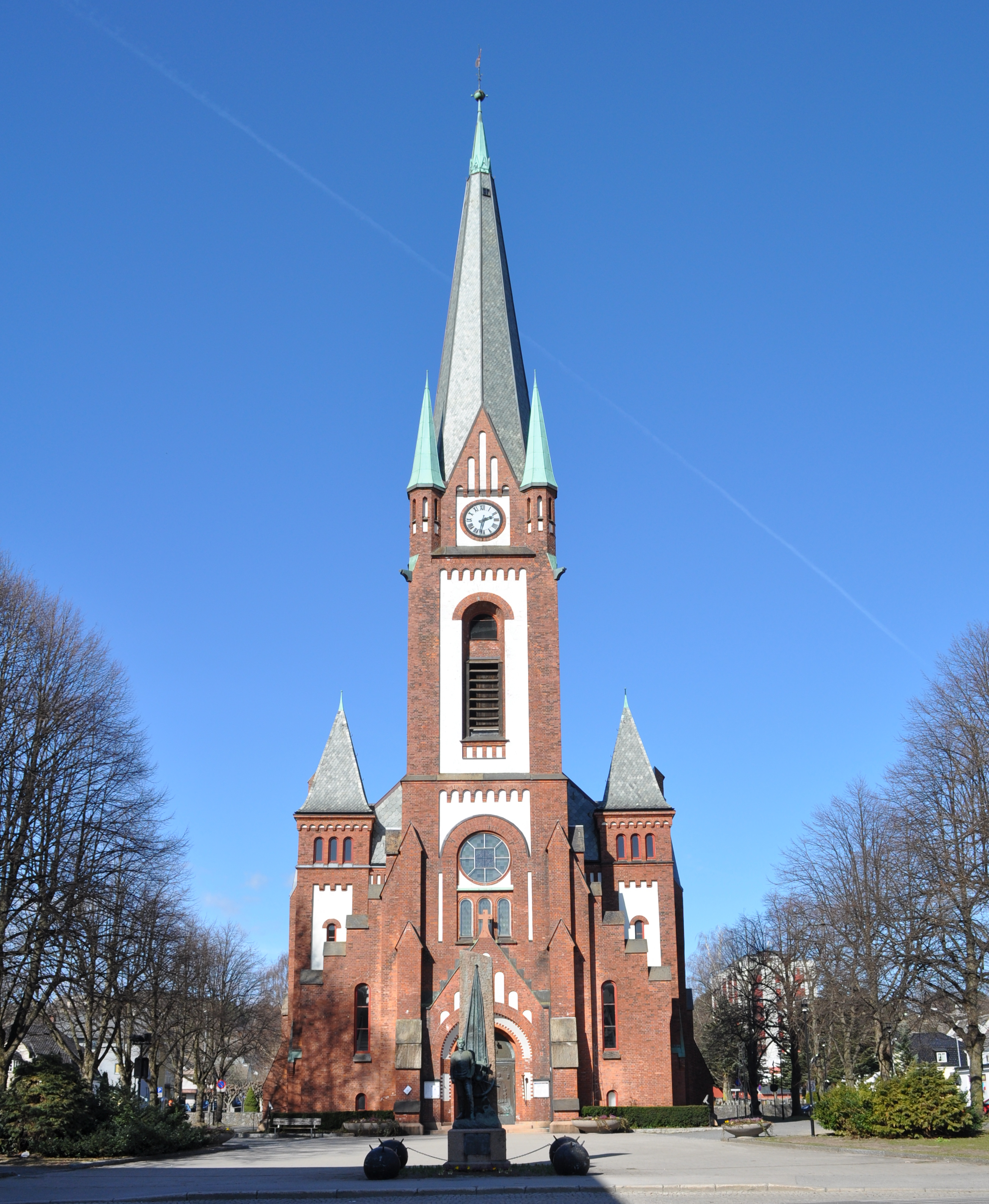
- View of the church
- Sandefjord Church
- 59°07′59″N 10°13′18″E
- Location: Sandefjord Municipality, Vestfold
- Country: Norway
- Denomination: Church of Norway
- Churchmanship: Evangelical Lutheran

History
- Status: Parish church
- Founded: 1872
- Consecrated: 23 October 1903

Architecture
- Functional status: Active
- Architect: Karl Michalsen
- Architectural type: Cruciform
- Completed: 1903 (123 years ago)

Specifications
- Capacity: 600
- Materials: Brick

Administration
- Diocese: Tunsberg
- Deanery: Sandefjord prosti
- Parish: Sandefjord
- Norwegian Cultural Heritage Site
- Type: Church
- Status: Listed
- ID: 85383

Sandefjord Church (Norwegian: Sandefjord kirke) is a parish church of the Church of Norway in Sandefjord Municipality in Vestfold county, Norway. It is located in the city of Sandefjord. It is the church for the Sandefjord parish which is part of the Sandefjord prosti (deanery) in the Diocese of Tunsberg. The red brick church was built in a cruciform design in 1903 using plans drawn up by the architect Karl Michalsen. The church seats about 600 people.

== History ==
The ladested of Sandefjord received kjøpstad rights in 1845 after becoming its own municipality on 1 January 1838. However, the young town had no church, and the inhabitants had to go to the nearby Sandeherred Church. That church was located north of the town in a different municipality. The townspeople were relegated to a few rows at the back of the second floor seating gallery and there eventually arose great dissatisfaction with this among the people of Sandefjord. The emerging town reached 2,500 inhabitants in the 1870s, and on 10 December 1872 the town's first church was consecrated. It was a small, white timber-framed church that was designed by Jacob Wilhelm Nordan. It was located about 250 metres (820 ft) to the southeast of the present church, between Kongens gate road and Rådhusgaten road on the west side of Storgaten road. It was about the same distance south of Sandeherred Church. The church unfortunately was destroyed in the great town fire on the night of 16 March 1900.

Soon after the fire, planning for a new church began. Land belonging to the neighboring Sandeherred Church priest's farm on the north edge of the town was given for a new church. The new church was built according to drawings by Carl Michalsen. The new building was a brick cruciform church with a 60-metre (200 ft) high tower. Despite having a cruciform design, the trancepts are very short and the interior is set up like a long church. The main entrance to the church faces south towards the town, making it a real landmark in town. The new church was consecrated on 23 October 1903. The main entrance has two large bronze doors. Inside, the nave has seating for about 600 people. There are second floor seating galleries on three sides of the nave. The chancel floor is raised three steps up from the floor of the nave.

== Media gallery ==
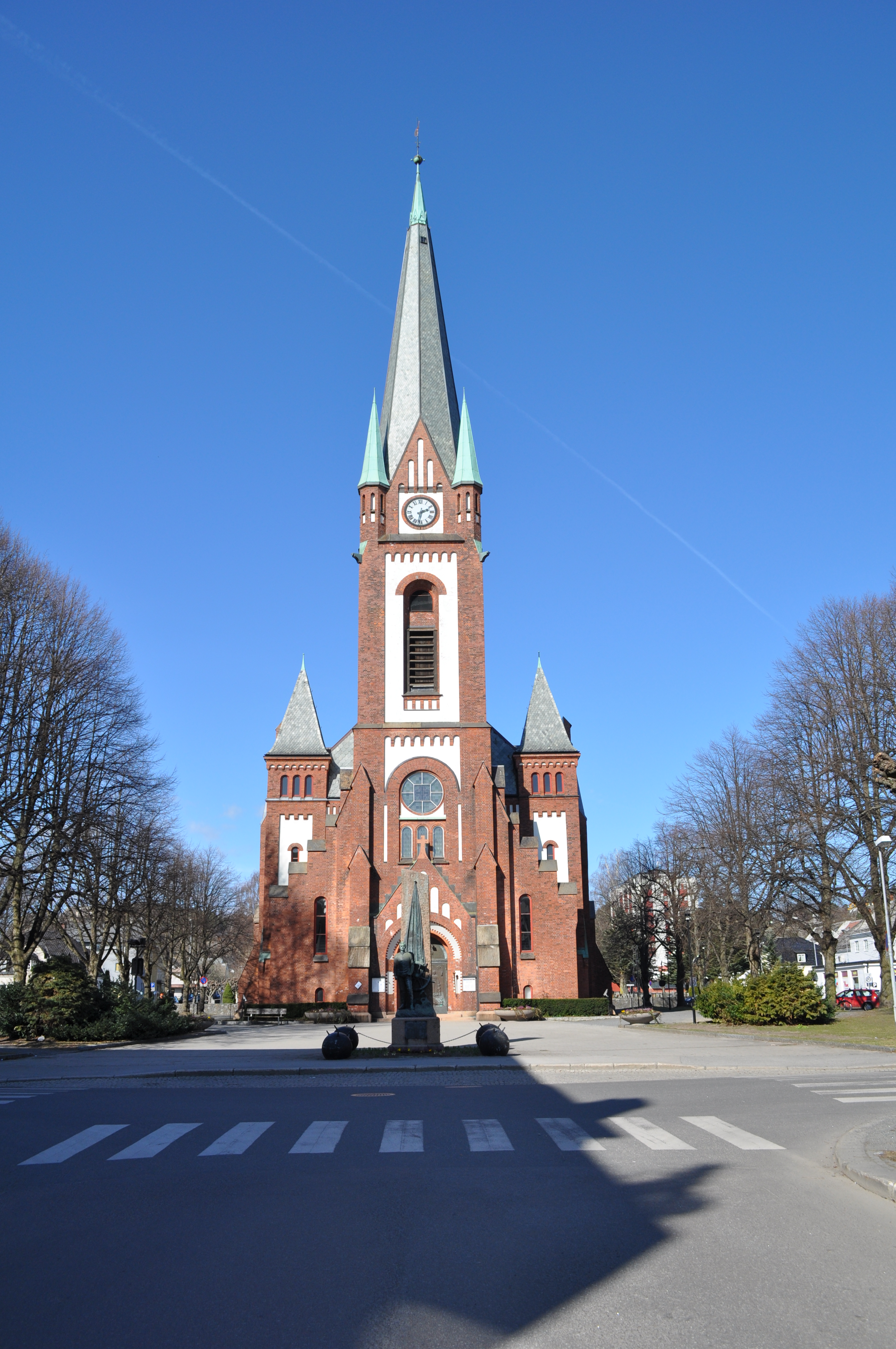

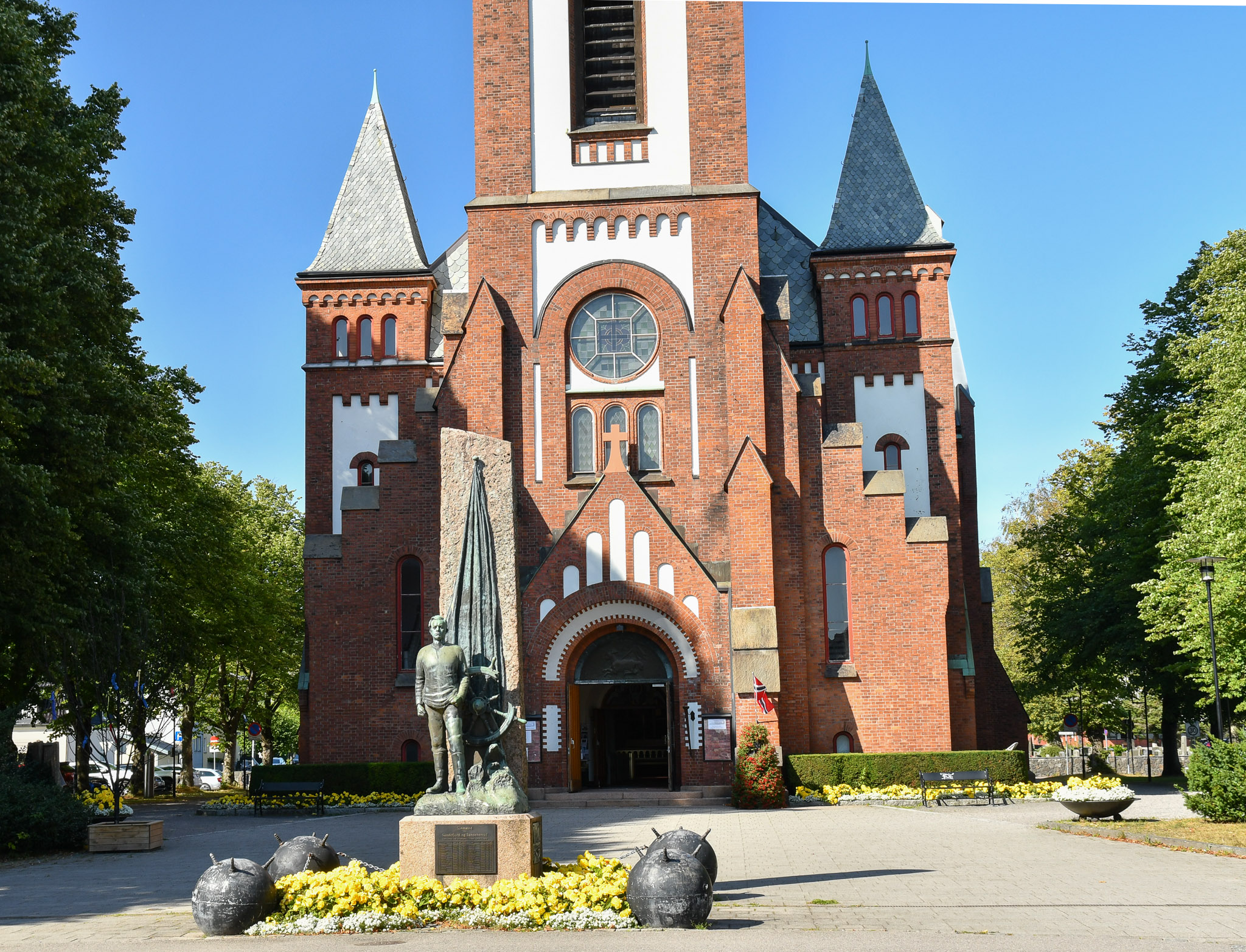

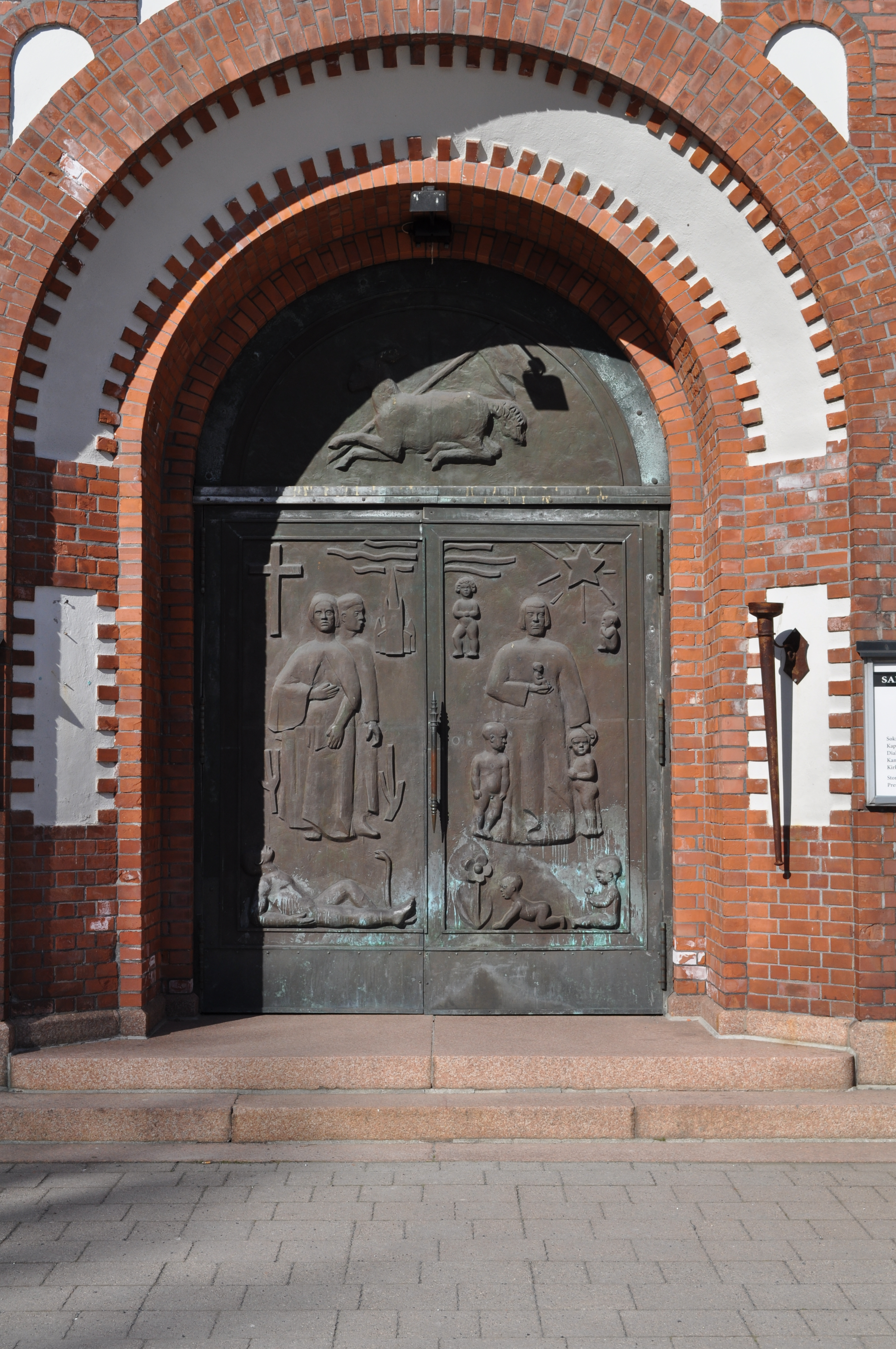

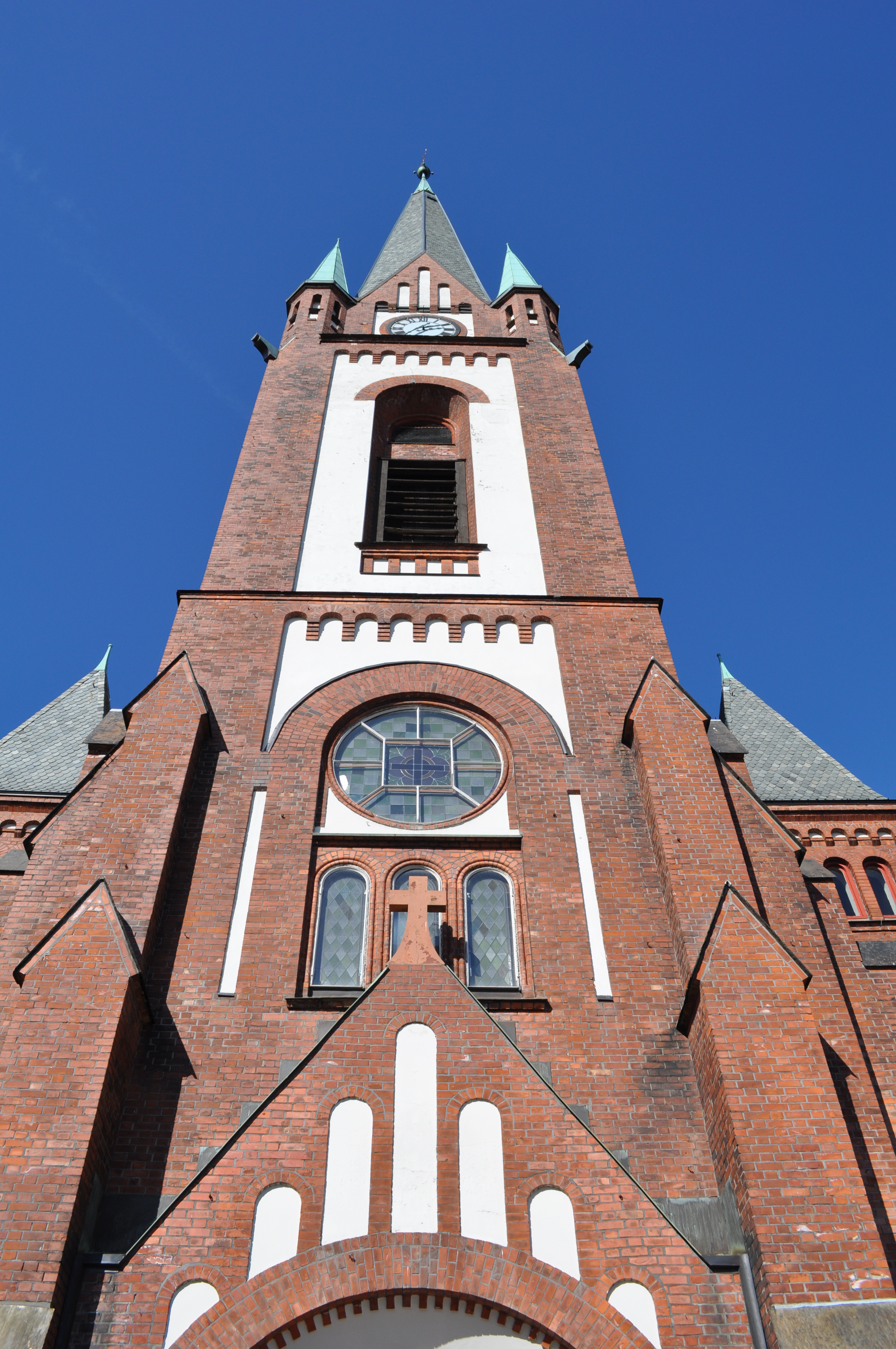

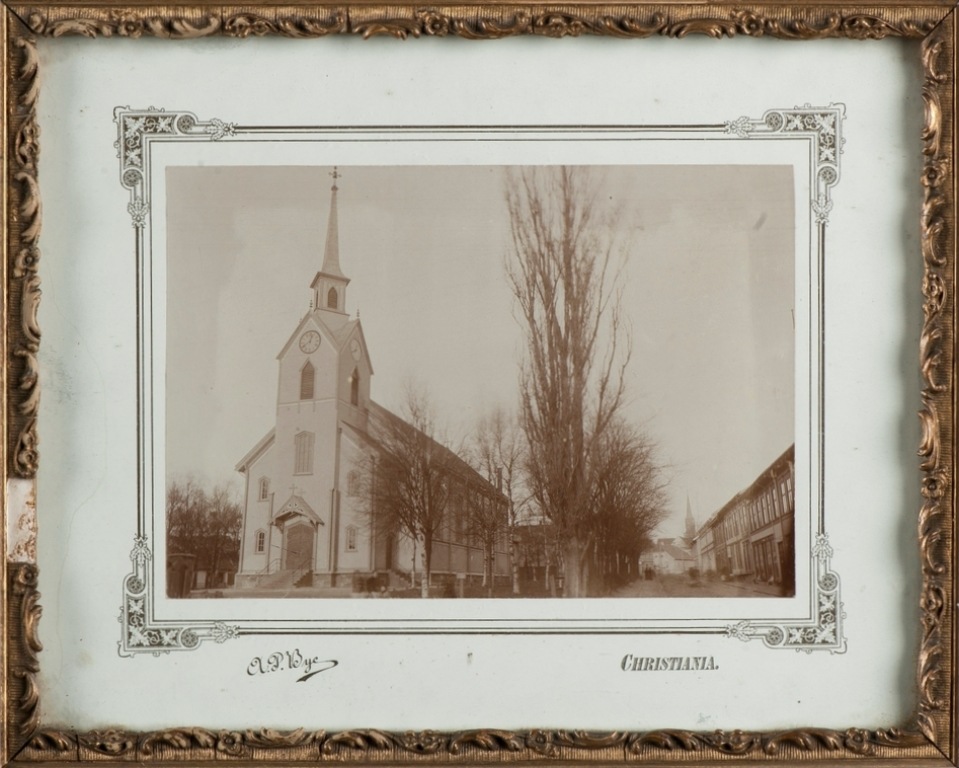
Exterior of the first church (1872–1900)

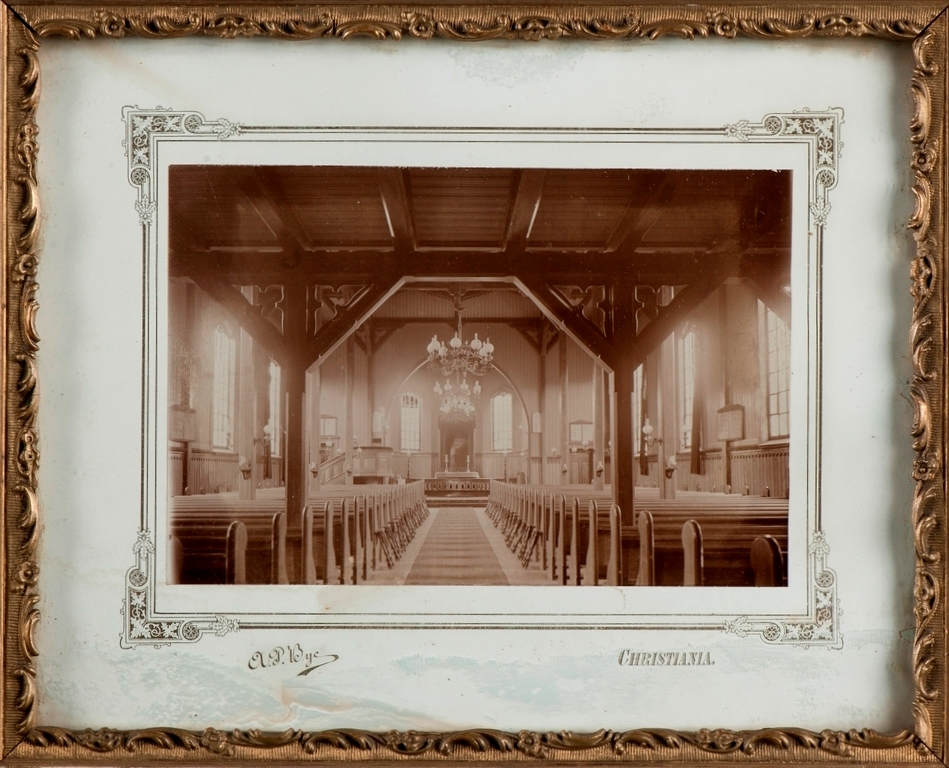
Interior of the first church (1872–1900)

== See also ==
- List of churches in Tunsberg
