= Tønsberg District Court =

Former district court in Norway

- Tønsberg tingrett
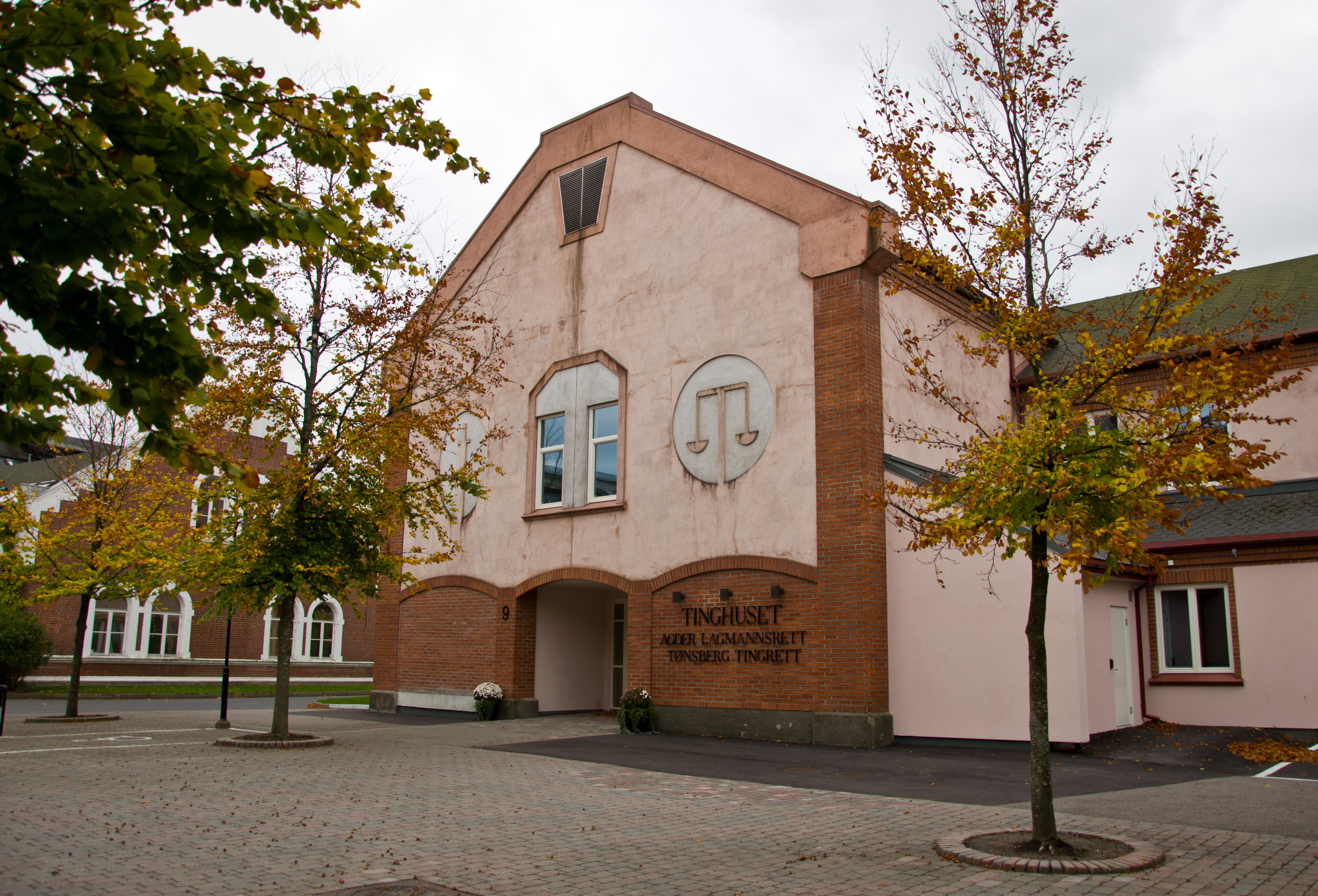
- The Courthouse of Tønsberg
- 59°16′40″N 10°24′20″E
- Established: 1684
- Dissolved: 1 January 2019
- Jurisdiction: Southeastern Vestfold
- Location: Tønsberg, Norway
- Coordinates: 59°16′40″N 10°24′20″E
- Appeals to: Agder Court of Appeal

Division map
- Historic Vestfold county court jurisdictions: Larvik District Court Sandefjord District Court Tønsberg District Court Nordre Vestfold District Court Drammen District Court

Tønsberg District Court (Norwegian: Tønsberg tingrett) was a district court in southeastern Vestfold county, Norway. The court was based in Tønsberg. The court existed until 2019. It historically had jurisdiction over the municipalities of Andebu, Nøtterøy, Stokke, Tjøme, and Tønsberg. Due to municipal mergers during the 2010s, by the time the court was abolished in 2019, it only had jurisdiction over Tønsberg Municipality and Færder Municipality. Cases from this court could be appealed to Agder Court of Appeal.

The court was a court of first instance. Its judicial duties were mainly to settle criminal cases and to resolve civil litigation as well as bankruptcy. The administration and registration tasks of the court included death registration, issuing certain certificates, performing duties of a notary public, and officiating civil wedding ceremonies. Cases from this court were heard by a combination of professional judges and lay judges.

== History ==
=== Søndre Jarlsberg District Court ===
The Søndre Jarlsberg District Court (later renamed as Tønsberg District Court) was established in 1684, originally having jurisdiction over all of southern Jarlsberg county including Ramnes, Borre, Sem, Nøtterøy, Stokke, and Andebu.

In 1847, a new Mellom Jarlsberg District Court was established, which reduced the area of jurisdiction for this court to just Sem, Stokke, and Nøtterøy. On 20 February 1849, Tjøme Municipality was moved to the jurisdiction of this court from the neighboring Larvik District Court.

On 10 November 1922, the court's name was changed to Sør-Jarlsberg District Court. On 21 April 1933, the old Tønsberg City Court was merged into the Sør-Jarlsberg District Court.

=== Tønsberg District Court ===
On 23 October 1936, the name of the court was changed to Tønsberg District Court. On 6 June 1952, the new Jarlsberg District Court was created and Sem Municipality and Stokke Municipality were moved to that new court which left the city of Tønsberg plus Nøtterøy and Tjøme municipalities in the Tønsberg District Court. In 1981, the Jarlsberg District Court was merged with the Tønsberg District Court which moved Sem, Stokke, and Andebu (back) to the jurisdiction of this court.

On 1 January 2019, Tønsberg District Court was merged with the Nordre Vestfold District Court, Sandefjord District Court, and Larvik District Court to create the new Vestfold District Court.
