= Sandefjord (town) =

Town in Vestfold, Norway

- Town/City
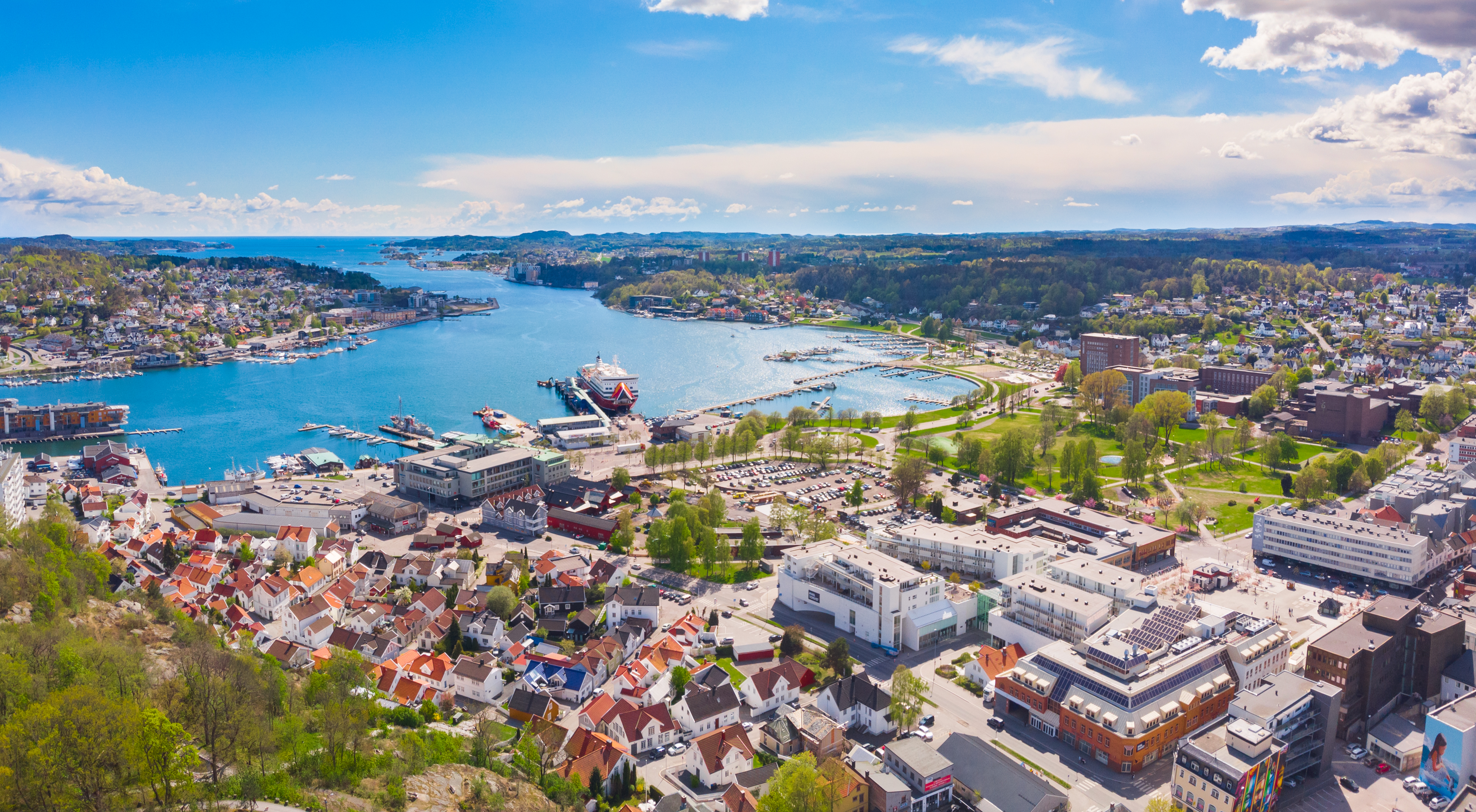
- View of the town
- Nickname: Hvalfangstbyen (lit. 'Town of Whaling')
- Interactive map of Sandefjord
- Coordinates: 59.13133°N 10.22234°E
- Country: Norway
- Region: Eastern Norway
- County: Vestfold
- District: Vestfold
- Municipality: Sandefjord Municipality
- Established as
- Ladested: 1680
- Kjøpstad: 1845

Area
  - Total: 26.14 km^{2} (10.09 sq mi)
- Elevation: 5 m (16 ft)

Population (2026)
  - Total: 49,186
  - Density: 1,882/km^{2} (4,870/sq mi)
- Demonym: Sandefjording
- Time zone: UTC+01:00 (CET)
  - Summer (DST): UTC+02:00 (CEST)
- Post Code: 3210 Sandefjord

Sandefjord (pronounced [ˈsɑ̂nːəfjuːr]; locally [ˈsɑ̂nːəfjøːɽ]) is a city (or town) that is the administrative centre of the large Sandefjord Municipality in Vestfold county, Norway. The town is located at the head of the Sandefjordsfjorden, along the Skagerrak coast in southern Vestfold. The large town also includes coastal areas on both sides of the Mefjorden on the Vesterøya and Østerøya peninsulas. The 26.14-square-kilometre (6,460-acre) town has a population (2026) of 49,186 and a population density of 1,882 inhabitants per square kilometre (4,870/sq mi).

The city is known for its rich Viking history and the prosperous whaling industry, which made Sandefjord the richest city in Norway. Today, it has built up the third-largest merchant fleet in Norway. The Sandefjord Museum is located in the town, the only museum in Europe that is dedicated to whaling. The 9th-century Gokstad Ship was discovered at the nearby Gokstad Mound, on the eastern edge of the city.

The Church of Norway has several churches in the city of Sandefjord including Sandefjord Church, Sandar Church, Bugården Church, and Vesterøy Church.

Sandefjord has numerous nicknames, including the Viking "capital" of Norway. It is also known as the undisputed summer city of Norway. The city is also known as the "whaling capital of the world" or the "whaling capital of Norway". It has also been dubbed the "Bathing City" (Badebyen), due to its many beaches and former resort spas. It is still considered a resort town, due to high numbers of visitors during summer months.

== History ==
The area where the town of Sandefjord is located has been inhabited for thousands of years. Excavations indicate that people have inhabited Sandefjord for around 3,000 years. Rock carvings at Haugen farm by Istrehågan in Jåberg are dated to 1,500–500 BCE.

The Vikings lived in Sandefjord and surrounding areas about 1,000 years ago, and numerous Viking artifacts and monuments can be found in Sandefjord. One of the most important remains from the Viking Age was found at the grave site Gokstadhaugen (Gokstad Mound) in Sandefjord. The Gokstad ship was excavated by Nicolay Nicolaysen and is now in the Viking Ship Museum in Oslo.

The town of Sandefjord was established as a ladested in 1680, giving it rights as a seaport. On 1 January 1838, it was established as a self-governing municipality under the new formannskapsdistrikt law. Sandefjord functioned as a seaport defined by the twin industries of shipping and shipbuilding throughout the 1600s and 1700s. It was formally recognized as a market town (kjøpstad) by King Oscar in 1845

Over time, the city-municipality was enlarged. On 1 January 1889, a part of the neighboring municipality of Sandeherred Municipality (population: 318) was transferred into Sandefjord. In 1931, an area of the neighboring Sandar Municipality (population: 66) was transferred into Sandefjord Municipality. In 1950, another area of the neighboring Sandar Municipality (population: 226) was transferred into Sandefjord Municipality. During the 1960s, there were many municipal mergers across Norway due to the work of the Schei Committee. On 1 January 1968 the city-municipality of Sandefjord (population: 6,242) was merged into the surrounding Sandar Municipality (population: 24,898), creating a much larger municipality which was also named Sandefjord. Prior to the merger, the city and municipality were one and the same, but after the merger, the city was just one small part of a much larger municipality.

=== Etymology ===
The name Sandefjord was first mentioned in chapter 169 of Sverris saga from the year 1200. It was then referring to the fjord which is now known as Sandefjordsfjord. The city of Sandefjord is named after the local fjord, now called Sandefjordsfjorden since the city of Sandefjord grew up at the head of the fjord. The first element of the name comes from the old Sande farm (Old Norse: Sandar). The old farm name is the plural form of sandr which means "sand" or "sandbanks". The last element comes from the word fjǫrðr which means "fjord".

== Government ==
In Norway, municipalities are the unit of local government. This means that cities and towns are simply designations for urban areas, but under current Norwegian law, they have no actual government authority. The city of Sandefjord lies within Sandefjord Municipality and is therefore governed by the municipal council of Sandefjord Municipality.

== Gallery ==
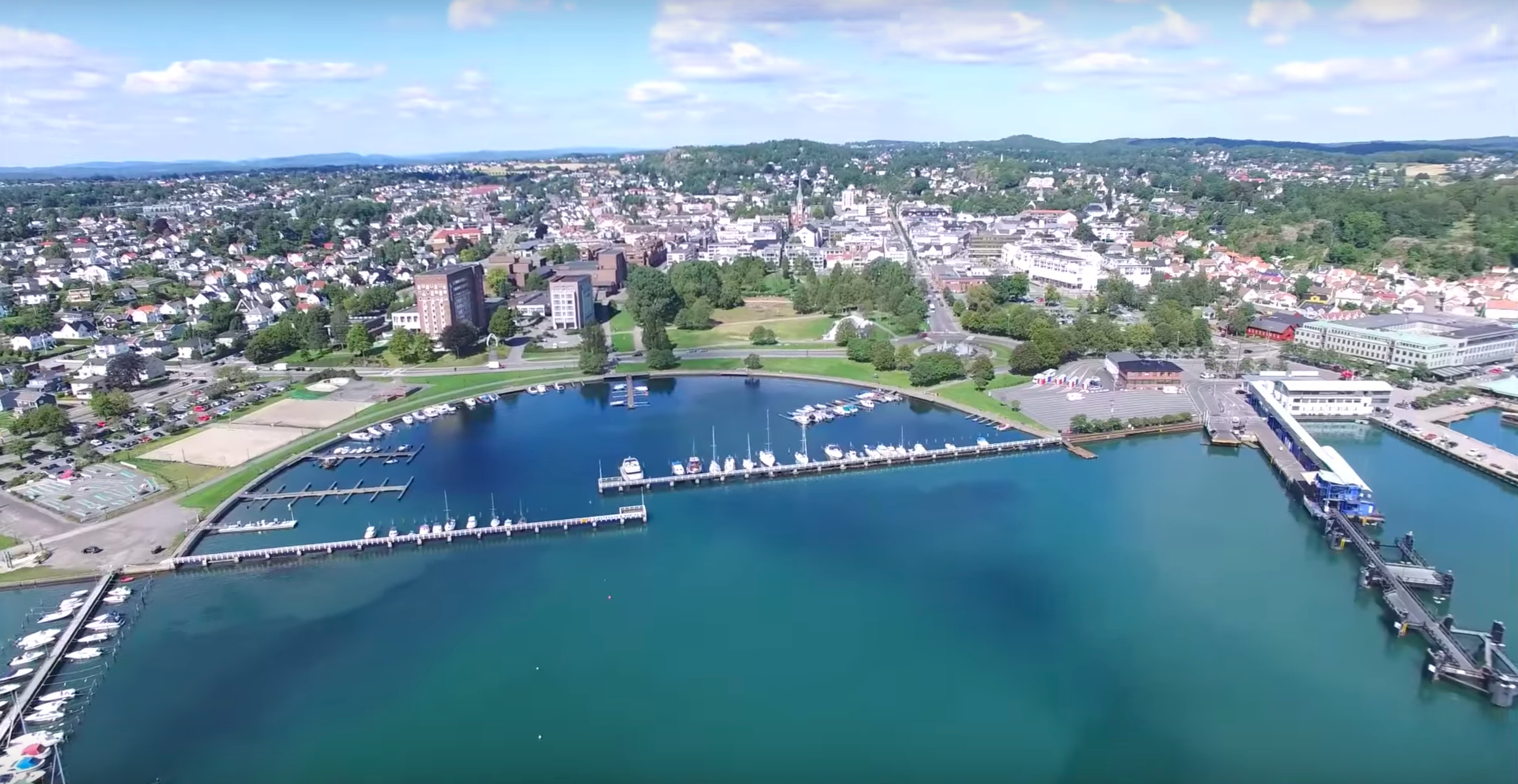

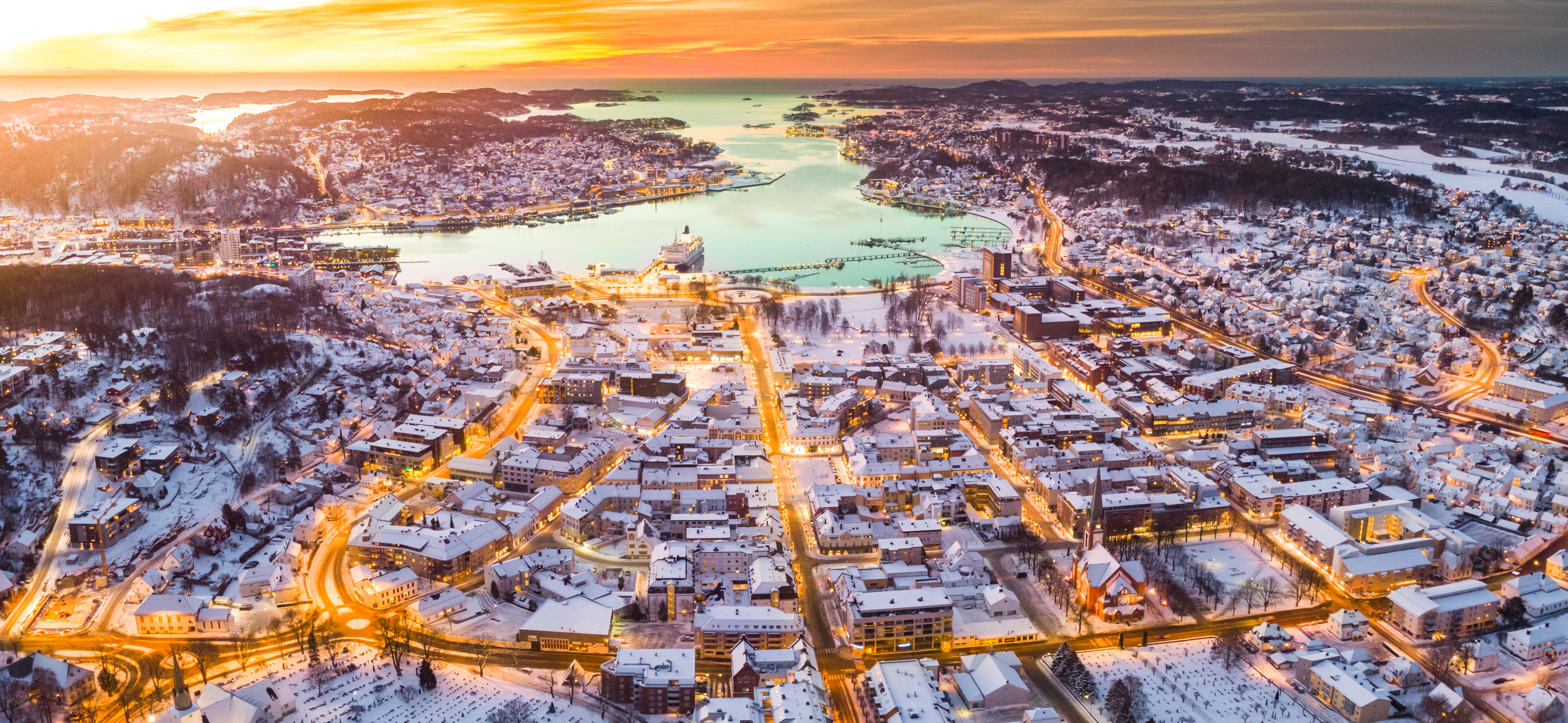

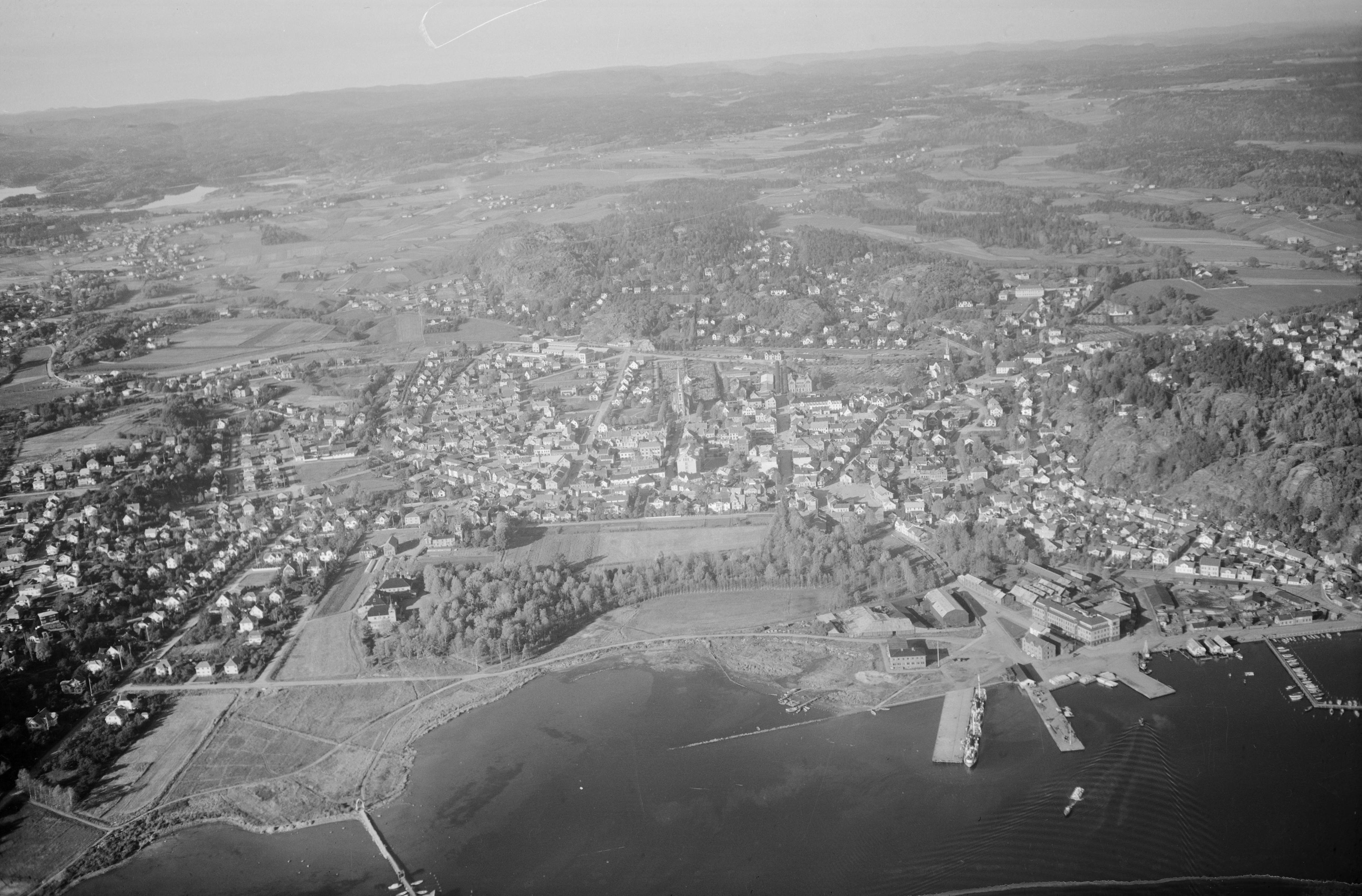

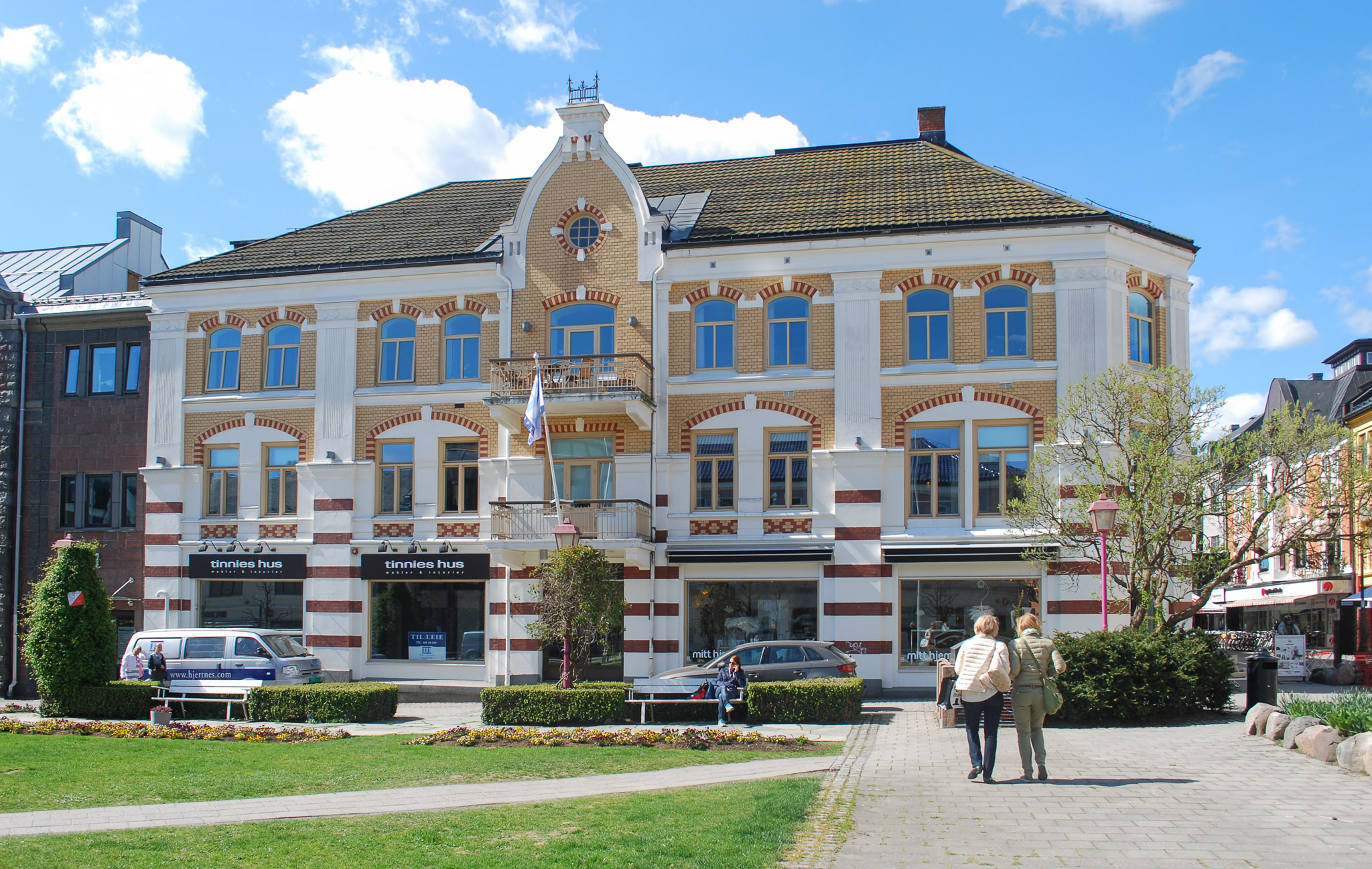

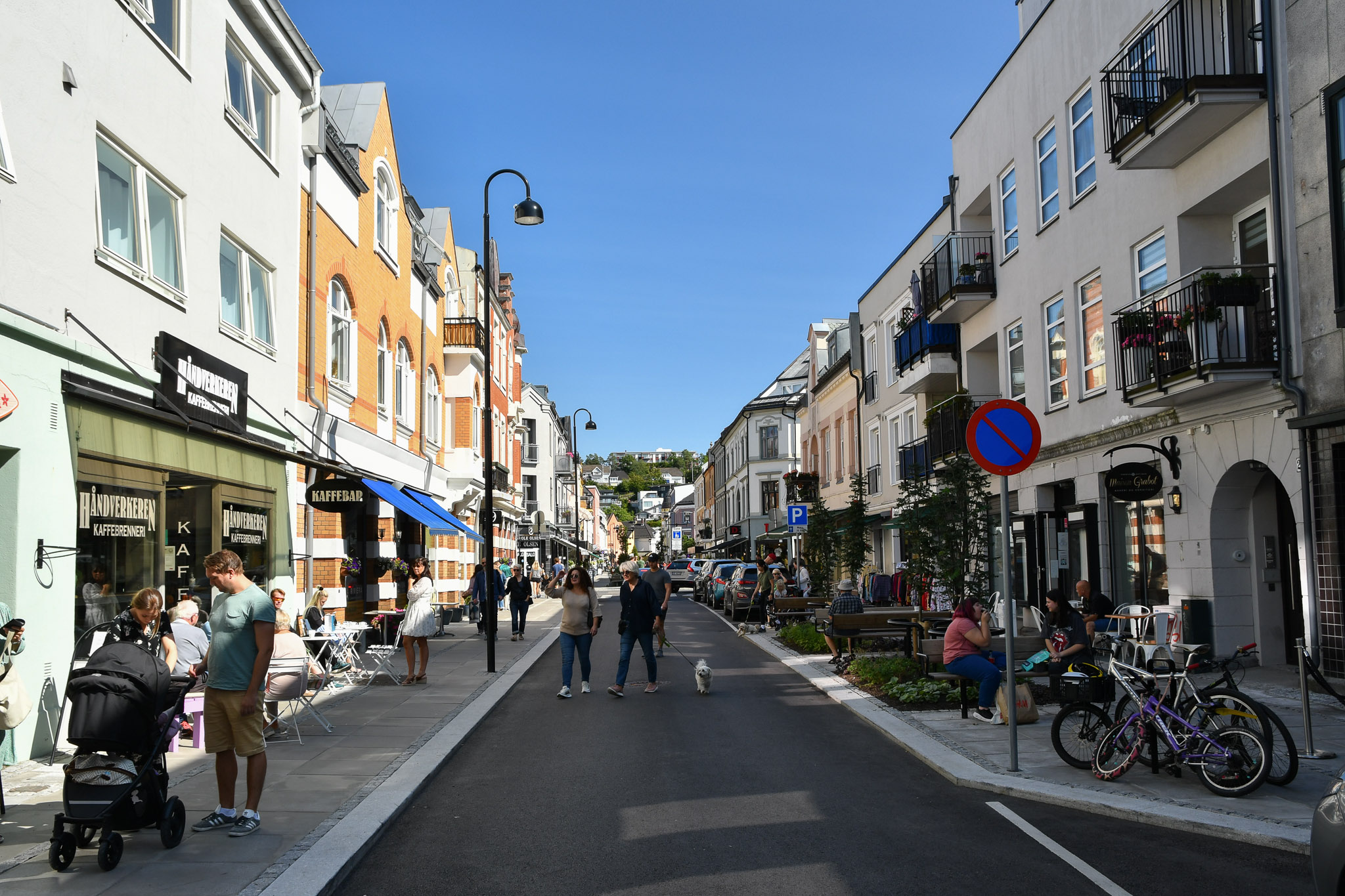

== See also ==
- List of towns and cities in Norway
