= Sandar Municipality =

Former municipality in Vestfold, Norway

Sandar Municipality Sandar herred
- Former municipality
- Sandeherad herred (historic name); Sandeherred herred (historic name)
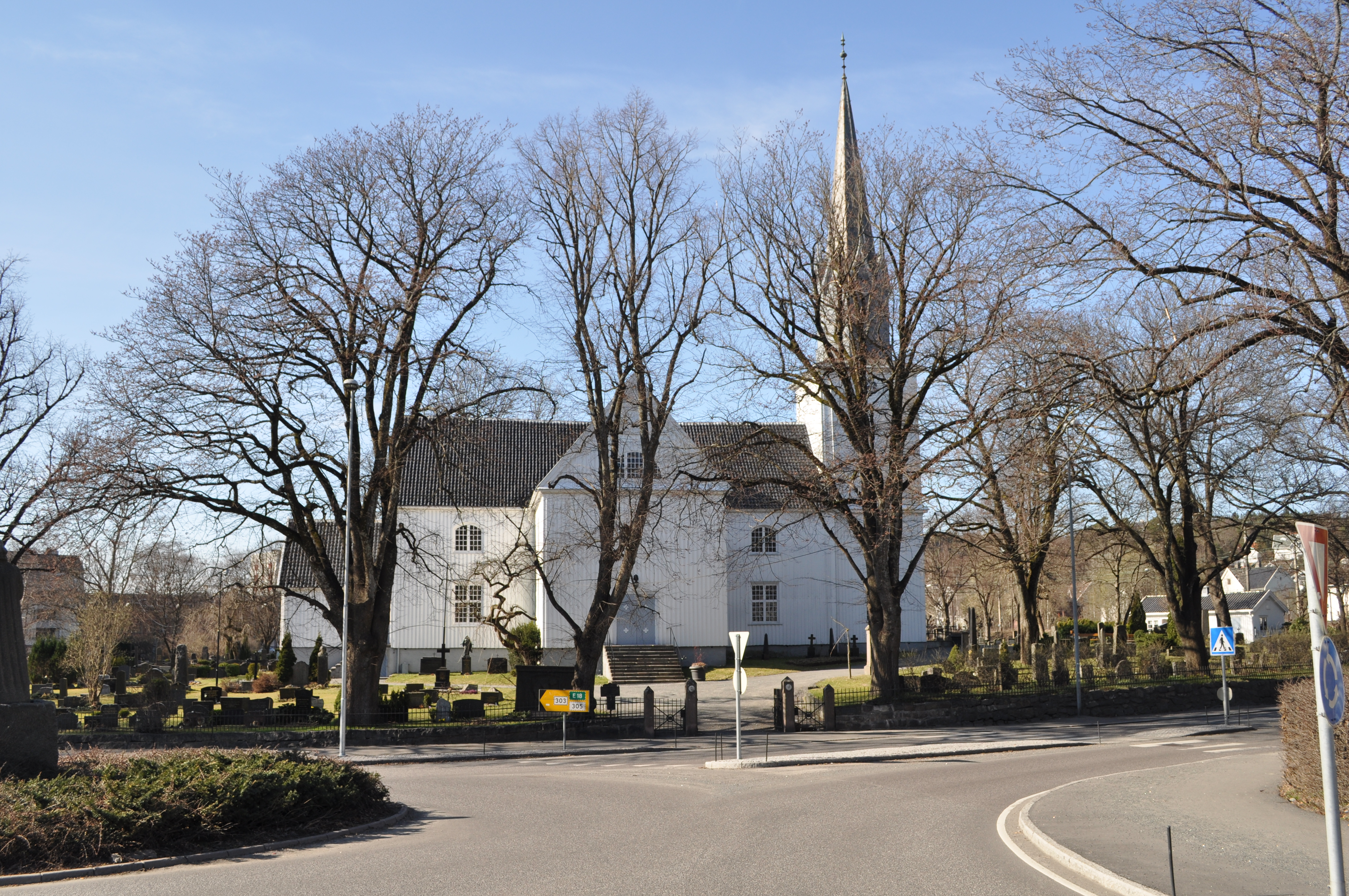
- Sandar Church

- Vestfold within Norway

- Sandar within Vestfold
- Coordinates: 59°08′03″N 10°13′28″E
- Country: Norway
- County: Vestfold
- District: Vestfold
- Established: 1 Jan 1838
  - Created as: Formannskapsdistrikt
- Disestablished: 1 Jan 1968
  - Succeeded by: Sandefjord Municipality
- Administrative centre: Sandar

Government
  - Mayor (1964–1967): Einar Abrahamsen (H)

Area (upon dissolution)
  - Total: 119.8 km^{2} (46.3 sq mi)
  - Rank: #368 in Norway
- Highest elevation (Hjertås): 147.48 m (483.9 ft)

Population (1967)
  - Total: 24,391
  - Rank: #22 in Norway
  - Density: 203.6/km^{2} (527/sq mi)
  - Change (10 years): ▲ +19.1%
- Demonym: Sandehering

Official language
  - Norwegian form: Bokmål
- Time zone: UTC+01:00 (CET)
  - Summer (DST): UTC+02:00 (CEST)
- ISO 3166 code: NO-0724

Sandar (Norwegian pronunciation: [ˈsɑ̂nːɑɾ]; locally [ˈsɑnːɑ]; historically called Sandeherred) is a former municipality in Vestfold county, Norway. The 119.8-square-kilometre (46.3 sq mi) municipality existed from 1838 until its dissolution in 1968. The area is now part of Sandefjord Municipality. The administrative centre was located at Sandar, right by the Sandar Church in what is now the town of Sandefjord.

Prior to its dissolution in 1968, the 119.8-square-kilometre (46.3 sq mi) municipality was the 368th largest by area out of the 454 municipalities in Norway. Sandar Municipality was the 22nd most populous municipality in Norway with a population of about 24,391. The municipality's population density was 203.6 inhabitants per square kilometre (527/sq mi) and its population had increased by 19.1% over the previous 10-year period.

During its existence, Sandar Municipality was basically the rural area surrounding an urban town. It had its share of industry, mostly located close to the town border. Many famous corporations now associated with the town of Sandefjord had their origins in Sandar Municipality including Jotun, Framnæs Mekaniske Værksted, and Sandar Fabrikker (a chemical plant dedicated to refining whale oil).

== General information ==
=== Administrative history ===
The formannskapsdistrikt law of 1837 created a system of local government in Norway by establishing each town (ladested or kjøpstad) and each Church of Norway prestegjeld as a civil municipality. On 1 January 1838, Sandeherred prestegjeld was established as Sandeherred Municipality (later spelled Sandar). The original municipality encircled the growing town of Sandefjord.

On 1 January 1889, an area of Sandeherred Municipality (population: 318) was transferred to Sandefjord Municipality. In 1931, another area of Sandar Municipality (population: 66) was transferred to Sandefjord Municipality. In 1950, another area of Sandar Municipality (population: 226) was transferred to Sandefjord Municipality.

During the 1960s, there were many municipal mergers across Norway due to the work of the Schei Committee. On 1 January 1964, Sandar Municipality]] (population: 24,898) was dissolved and merged with Sandefjord Municipality (population: 6,242) to form an enlarged Sandefjord Municipality.

=== Name ===
The municipality is named after the old Sandeherred prestegjeld. The prestegjeld was named after the old Sande farm (Old Norse: Sandar) since the first Sandar Church was built there. The first element is the plural form of sandr which means "sand" or "sandbanks". The last element was added later. It was derived from the old word herað which means "district" or "municipality".

Historically, the name of the municipality was spelled Sandeherred. On 3 November 1917, a royal resolution changed the spelling of the name of the municipality to Sandeherad. On 13 March 1931, a royal resolution changed the name of the municipality to Sandar, the original Old Norse name for the old farm.

=== Churches ===
The Church of Norway had one parish (sokn) within Sandar Municipality. At the time of the municipal dissolution, it was part of the Sandar prestegjeld and the Sandar prosti (deanery) in the Diocese of Tunsberg.

Churches in Sandar Municipality
Parish (sokn)	Church name	Location of the church	Year built
Sandar	Sandar Church	Sandar	1792

== Geography ==
Sandar Municipality was located in the southern, coastal part of Vestfold county. The European route E18 highway and the Vestfoldbanen railway line both passed through the municipality. The municipality encircled the whole town of Sandefjord until 1968 when they were merged. The highest point in the municipality was the 147.48-metre (483.9 ft) tall mountain Hjertås.

Stokke Municipality was located to the north, Tjøme Municipality was located to the east, the Skagerrak was to the south, Tjølling Municipality was located to the southwest, Hedrum Municipality was located to the west, and Andebu Municipality was located to the northwest. Sandefjord Municipality was an enclave located in the central part of Sandar Municipality. The village of Himberg was an exclave of Sandar Municipality located on the border of Hedrum and Tjølling municipalities, just west of the border with Sandar Municipality.

== Government ==
While it existed, Sandar Municipality was responsible for primary education (through 10th grade), outpatient health services, senior citizen services, welfare and other social services, zoning, economic development, and municipal roads and utilities. The municipality was governed by a municipal council of directly elected representatives. The mayor was indirectly elected by a vote of the municipal council. The municipality was under the jurisdiction of the Sandar District Court and the Agder Court of Appeal.

=== Municipal council ===
The municipal council (Herredsstyre) of Sandar Municipality was made up of representatives that were elected to four year terms. The tables below show the historical composition of the council by political party.

Sandar herredsstyre 1963–1967
Party name (in Norwegian)	Number of representatives
Labour Party (Arbeiderpartiet)	18
Conservative Party (Høyre)	15
Christian Democratic Party (Kristelig Folkeparti)	2
Centre Party (Senterpartiet)	1
Socialist People's Party (Sosialistisk Folkeparti)	1
Liberal Party (Venstre)	4
Total number of members:	41
Note: On 1 January 1964, Sandar Municipality became part of Sandefjord Municipality.

Sandar herredsstyre 1959–1963
Party name (in Norwegian)	Number of representatives
Labour Party (Arbeiderpartiet)	18
Conservative Party (Høyre)	14
Christian Democratic Party (Kristelig Folkeparti)	2
Centre Party (Senterpartiet)	2
Liberal Party (Venstre)	5
Total number of members:	41

Sandar herredsstyre 1955–1959
Party name (in Norwegian)	Number of representatives
Labour Party (Arbeiderpartiet)	17
Conservative Party (Høyre)	13
Christian Democratic Party (Kristelig Folkeparti)	2
Farmers' Party (Bondepartiet)	2
Liberal Party (Venstre)	7
Total number of members:	41

Sandar herredsstyre 1951–1955
Party name (in Norwegian)	Number of representatives
Labour Party (Arbeiderpartiet)	15
Conservative Party (Høyre)	13
Communist Party (Kommunistiske Parti)	1
Christian Democratic Party (Kristelig Folkeparti)	3
Farmers' Party (Bondepartiet)	1
Liberal Party (Venstre)	7
Total number of members:	40

Sandar herredsstyre 1947–1951
Party name (in Norwegian)	Number of representatives
Labour Party (Arbeiderpartiet)	13
Conservative Party (Høyre)	11
Communist Party (Kommunistiske Parti)	2
Christian Democratic Party (Kristelig Folkeparti)	3
Farmers' Party (Bondepartiet)	2
Joint list of the Liberal Party (Venstre) and the Radical People's Party (Radikale Folkepartiet)	9
Total number of members:	40

Sandar herredsstyre 1945–1947
Party name (in Norwegian)	Number of representatives
Labour Party (Arbeiderpartiet)	14
Conservative Party (Høyre)	9
Communist Party (Kommunistiske Parti)	3
Christian Democratic Party (Kristelig Folkeparti)	5
Farmers' Party (Bondepartiet)	2
Joint list of the Liberal Party (Venstre) and the Radical People's Party (Radikale Folkepartiet)	7
Total number of members:	40

Sandar herredsstyre 1937–1941*
Party name (in Norwegian)	Number of representatives
Labour Party (Arbeiderpartiet)	13
Conservative Party (Høyre)	15
Farmers' Party (Bondepartiet)	1
Liberal Party (Venstre)	11
Total number of members:	40
Note: Due to the German occupation of Norway during World War II, no elections were held for new municipal councils until after the war ended in 1945.

=== Mayors ===
The mayor (Norwegian: ordfører) of Sandar Municipality was the political leader of the municipality and the chairperson of the municipal council. The following people have held this position:

- 1838–1839: Anders Haraldsen Sverstad
- 1840–1841: Erland Erlandsen Orerød
- 1842–1859: Peder Hansen Holtan
- 1860–1863: Brynnil Haraldsen Hotvet
- 1864–1878: Henrik Klaveness
- 1878–1881: Thor Bryn
- 1882–1892: Olaus Klaveness (V)
- 1892–1893: Oluf Joberg (V)
- 1893–1897: Olaus Klaveness (V)
- 1898–1907: Fredrik Enge (V)
- 1908–1913: Julius From (H)
- 1914–1919: Johan L. Tønnesson (V)
- 1920–1928: Johan Rasmussen (H)
- 1929–1931: Lars Klaveness (H)
- 1932–1937: P. Irgens Odberg (H)
- 1938–1940: Haldor Virik (H)
- 1941–1941: Kristian Laug (V)
- 1941–1945: Ole Kristian Holtan (NS)
- 1945–1947: Haldor Virik (H)
- 1948–1957: Egill Thoresen (H)
- 1958–1959: Kristoffer Kalleberg (Ap)
- 1960–1963: Bjarne Vangstein (H)
- 1964–1967: Einar Abrahamsen (H)

== See also ==
- List of former municipalities of Norway
