= List of district courts of Norway =

A District Court in Norway is called a tingrett.

== List of current and former district courts in Norway ==
=== A ===
- Agder District Court
- Alstahaug District Court
- Alta District Court
- Asker og Bærum District Court
- Aust-Agder District Court
- Aust-Telemark District Court

=== B ===
- Bergen District Court
- Brønnøy District Court
- Buskerud District Court

=== D ===
- Dalane District Court
- Drammen District Court

=== E ===
- Eiker, Modum og Sigdal District Court

=== F ===
- Fjordane District Court
- Follo District Court
- Follo og Nordre Østfold District Court
- Fosen District Court
- Fredrikstad District Court

=== G ===
- Gjøvik District Court
- Glåmdal District Court
- Gudbrandsdal District Court

=== H ===
- Hadeland og Land District Court
- Halden District Court
- Hallingdal District Court
- Hammerfest District Court
- Hardanger District Court
- Hardanger og Voss District Court
- Haugaland District Court
- Haugaland og Sunnhordland District Court
- Hedmarken District Court
- Hedmarken og Østerdal District Court
- Heggen og Frøland District Court
- Helgeland District Court
- Hordaland District Court

=== I ===
- Inderøy District Court
- Indre Finnmark District Court
- Indre Follo District Court
- Indre og Østre Finnmark District Court
- Inntrøndelag District Court

=== J ===
- Jæren District Court

=== K ===
- Kongsberg District Court
- Kristiansand District Court

=== L ===
- Larvik District Court
- Lister District Court
- Lofoten District Court

=== M ===
- Midtre Hålogaland District Court
- Moss District Court
- Møre og Romsdal District Court

=== N ===
- Namdal District Court
- Nedre Romerike District Court
- Nedre Telemark District Court
- Nord-Gudbrandsdal District Court
- Nord-Troms District Court
- Nord-Troms og Senja District Court
- Nord-Østerdal District Court
- Nordhordland District Court
- Nordmøre District Court
- Nordmøre og Romsdal District Court
- Nordre Vestfold District Court

=== O ===
- Ofoten District Court
- Oslo District Court

=== R ===
- Rana District Court
- Ringerike District Court
- Ringerike, Asker og Bærum District Court
- Ringerike og Hallingdal District Court
- Romerike og Glåmdal District Court
- Romsdal District Court
- Ryfylke District Court

=== S ===
- Salten District Court
- Salten og Lofoten District Court
- Sandefjord District Court
- Sandnes District Court
- Sarpsborg District Court
- Senja District Court
- Sogn District Court
- Sogn og Fjordane District Court
- Stavanger District Court
- Stjør- og Verdal District Court
- Sunnhordland District Court
- Sunnmøre District Court
- Søndre Østfold District Court
- Sør-Gudbrandsdal District Court
- Sør-Rogaland District Court
- Sør-Trøndelag District Court
- Sør-Østerdal District Court
- Søre Sunnmøre District Court

=== T ===
- Telemark District Court
- Toten District Court
- Trondenes District Court
- Trondheim District Court
- Trøndelag District Court
- Tønsberg District Court

=== V ===
- Valdres District Court
- Vest-Telemark District Court
- Vesterålen District Court
- Vestfold District Court
- Vestoppland og Valdres District Court
- Vestre Finnmark District Court
- Vestre Innlandet District Court

=== Y ===
- Ytre Follo District Court

=== Ø ===
- Øst-Finnmark District Court
- Østre Innlandet District Court
- Øvre Romerike District Court
- Øvre Telemark District Court
