= Arne Jørgen Aasen =

Norwegian chemist and professor emeritus (born 1939)

- Born: 15 October 1939 (age 86); Norway
- Education: Norwegian Institute of Technology; Royal Institute of Technology
- Known for: Organic Chemistry, Natural Products Chemistry
- Scientific career
- Fields: Chemistry, Organic Chemistry
- Institutions: University of Oslo; University of Tromsø; Norwegian University of Life Sciences; Norwegian Institute of Technology; Royal Institute of Technology
- Thesis: (1972)

Arne Jørgen Aasen (born 15 October 1939) is a Norwegian chemist and professor emeritus at the University of Oslo, School of Pharmacy. Aasen received his engineering degree in biochemistry and organic chemistry in 1964, and a doctorate (dr. ing.) in organic chemistry in August 1966 from The Norwegian Institute of Technology, Trondheim (renamed Norwegian University of Science and Technology in 1996). In 1972 he defended his thesis for a doctorate (tekn. dr.) at The Royal Institute of Technology, Stockholm, Sweden.

In 1972 Aasen was appointed as unpaid associate professor ("oavlönad dosent") in organic chemistry at Royal Institute of Technology in Stockholm. Three years later Aasen was employed as a doesn't in general and pharmaceutical organic chemistry at the School of Pharmacy in the University of Oslo, where except for two periods, he was a member of the staff until his retirement in 2007.

In 1979 Aasen became a professor in organic chemistry at the University of Tromsø, Department of Chemistry, and in 1983 professor in chemistry at the Norwegian College of Agriculture (the Norwegian University of Life Sciences after 1995), Institute of Chemistry, Ås. He was an employee at the University of Tromsø and the Norwegian College of Agriculture for two and five years, respectively.

Aasen was contacted in 2017 by associated professor Aman Dekebo who suggested collaboration re structural elucidations, structure-activity studies of compounds from the resin of Commophora africana which is used in traditional medicine. The results were published in 2020

o the University of Oslo School of Pharmacy in 1988 as professor in his previous field. Arne Jørgen Aasen was appointed professor II in natural products chemistry at the University of Tromsø, School of Pharmacy from 1996 to 2007.

Aasen has held a number of research positions abroad. He was a research scientist with Commonwealth Scientific and Industrial Research Organisation in Melbourne, Australia, postdoctoral fellow and research associate in professor Ralph T. Holman's group at The Hormel Institute, University of Minnesota, Austin, Minnesota, USA. Professor Ralph T. Holman published the first paper describing the well known omega-3 nomenclature in 1964. Aasen was appointed research scientist at the Research Department of Swedish Tobacco Co., Stockholm, Sweden. He has also been visiting professor at ARCO (Atlantic Richfield Company) Plant Cell Research Institute, Dublin, California, USA. and at Nycomed Salutar Inc., Sunnyvale, California, USA.

Aasen's research areas include determination of the absolute configurations of racemic drugs, isolation, structural determination and syntheses of natural products, e.g. carotenoids and pyrrolizidine alkaloids, mass spectrometry of specifically deuterium-labelled wax esters, fatty acids and triglycerides, and identification and syntheses of flavour constituents from tobacco and other plants.

Aasen was from 1979 to 1981 responsible for the establishment of a section for organic chemistry at University of Tromsø. During the period 1989 to 2002 Aasen was head of the Department of Medicinal Chemistry, School of Pharmacy, University of Oslo.

Aasen has participated in about twenty lawsuits dealing with drugs and patent infringements either as an expert co-judge of Borgarting Court of Appeal, the District Courts of Asker and Bærum, Follo, and Oslo, or an expert for one of the parties in Norway and in New York, USA. He has since 2000 been consultant for the Norwegian registries of drugs used in human and veterinary medicine.

== Academic distinctions ==
- In 1988 Aasen was called upon to a membership of the Royal Norwegian Society of Sciences and Letters, Trondheim, Norway.
- Aasen has been a member of the International Advisory Board, Bulletin of the Chemical Society of Ethiopia since 2000.
