= Hedmarken and Østerdal District Court =

First-instance law court in Norway

- Hedmarken og Østerdal tingrett
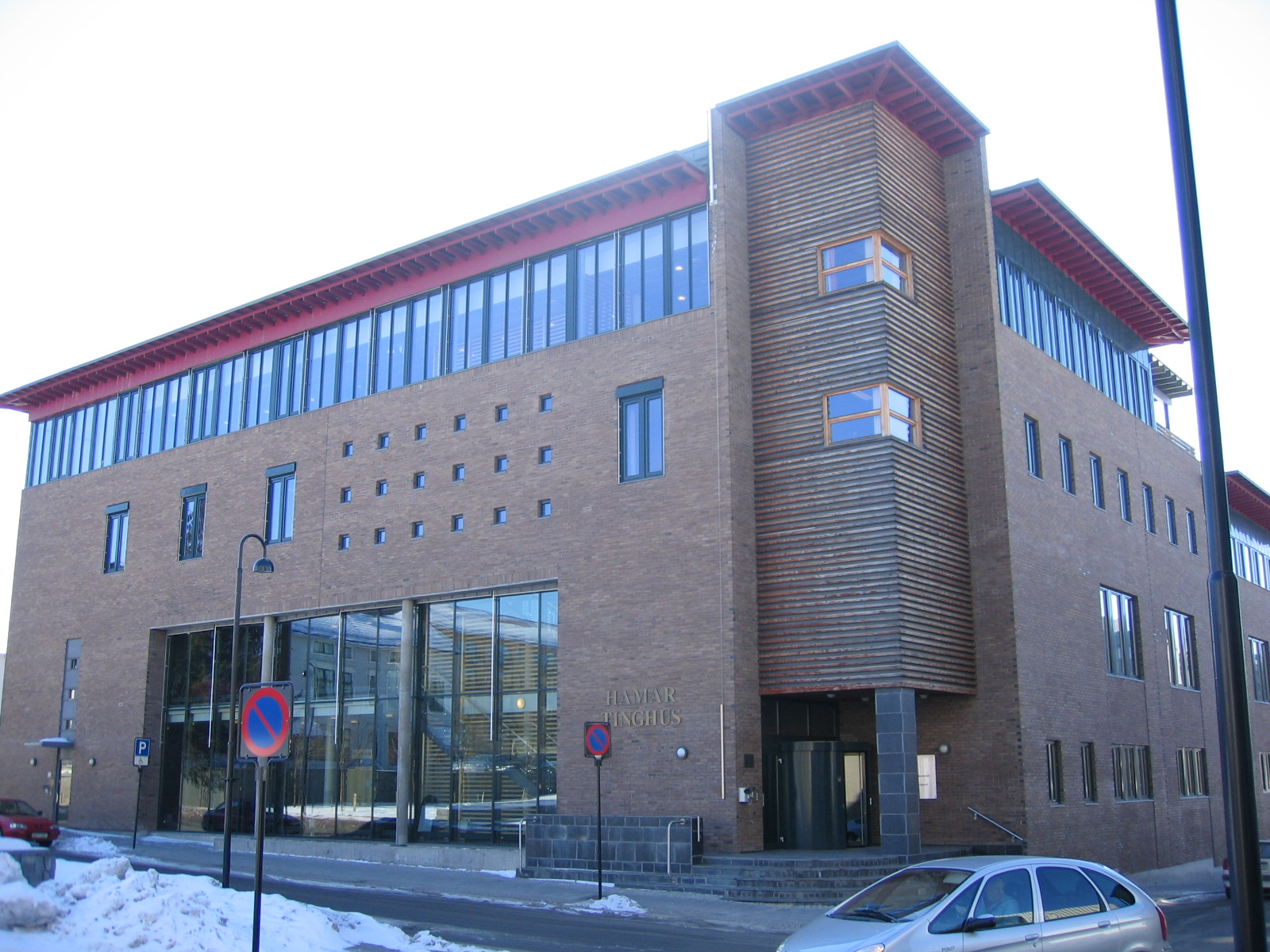
- View of the courthouse in Hamar
- Interactive map of Hedmarken and Østerdal; District Court
- 60°47′36″N 11°04′39″E
- Established: 26 April 2021
- Jurisdiction: Hedmarken and Østerdal, Norway
- Location: Elverum, Hamar, and Tynset
- Coordinates: 60°47′36″N 11°04′39″E
- Appeals to: Eidsivating Court of Appeal
- Website: Official website

Hedmarken and Østerdal District Court (Norwegian: Hedmarken og Østerdal tingrett) is a district court located in Innlandet county, Norway. This court is based at three different courthouses which are located in Elverum, Hamar, and Tynset. The court is subordinate to the Eidsivating Court of Appeal. The court serves the eastern part of the county, in particular, the Hedmarken and Østerdal regions. The court accepts cases from 17 municipalities as follows:

- The courthouse in Elverum accepts cases from the municipalities of Elverum, Trysil, Våler, Åmot, and Åsnes.
- The courthouse in Hamar accepts cases from the municipalities of Hamar, Løten, Ringsaker, and Stange.
- The court in Tynset accepts cases from the municipalities of Alvdal, Engerdal, Folldal, Os, Rendalen, Stor-Elvdal, Tolga, and Tynset.

The court is led by a chief judge (sorenskriver) and several other judges. The court is a court of first instance. Its judicial duties are mainly to settle criminal cases and to resolve civil litigation as well as bankruptcy. The administration and registration tasks of the court include death registration, issuing certain certificates, performing duties of a notary public, and officiating civil wedding ceremonies. Cases from this court are heard by a combination of professional judges and lay judges. Cases from this district court may be appealed to the Eidsivating Court of Appeal.

== History ==
This court (originally named Østre Innlandet) was established on 26 April 2021 after the old Hedmarken District Court, Nord-Østerdal District Court and Sør-Østerdal District Court were all merged into one court. The new district court system continues to use the courthouses from the predecessor courts. On 10 June 2025, the name of the court was changed from Østre Innlandet District Court to Hedmarken og Østerdal District Court.
