= Ringerike District Court =

Former district court in Norway

- Ringerike tingrett
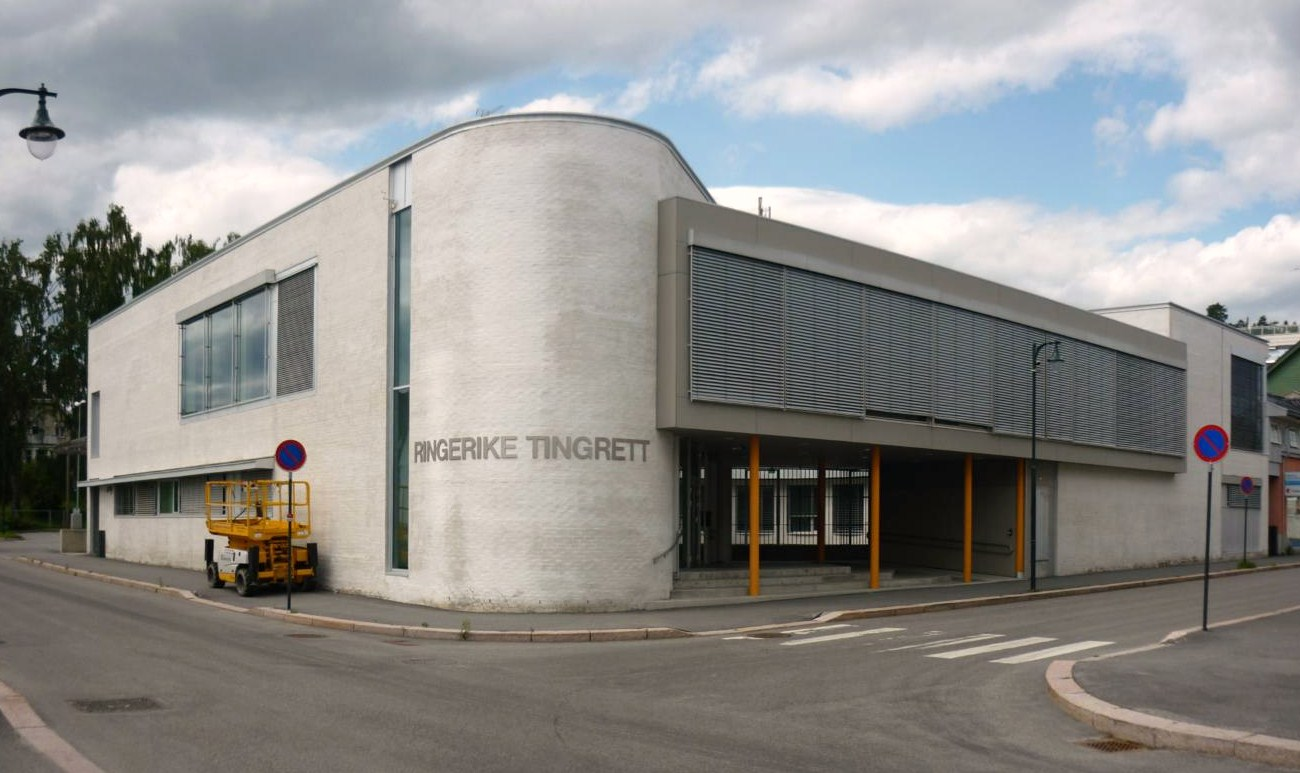
- Ringerike District Court pictured in 2013
- 60°09′49″N 10°15′19″E
- Established: 9 August 1825
- Dissolved: 26 April 2021
- Jurisdiction: Ringerike
- Location: Hønefoss, Norway
- Coordinates: 60°09′49″N 10°15′19″E
- Appeals to: Borgarting Court of Appeal

Ringerike District Court (Norwegian: Ringerike tingrett) was a district court in Buskerud county, Norway. The court was based in Hønefoss. The court existed until 2021. It had jurisdiction over Hole Municipality, Jevnaker Municipality, and Ringerike Municipality. Cases from this court could be appealed to Borgarting Court of Appeal.

The court was a court of first instance. Its judicial duties were mainly to settle criminal cases and to resolve civil litigation as well as bankruptcy. The administration and registration tasks of the court included death registration, issuing certain certificates, performing duties of a notary public, and officiating civil wedding ceremonies. Cases from this court were heard by a combination of professional judges and lay judges.

== History ==
The court was created on 9 August 1825, when the old district court covering both Ringerike and Hallingdal was divided. Originally, the Ringerike District Court covered Norderhov and Hole. From 1963-1977, the court was named Hønefoss District Court, but it was changed (back) to Ringerike District Court in 1977. In 2008, Jevnaker Municipality was transferred to this court district.

On 26 April 2021, Ringerike District Court was merged with the Asker og Bærum District Court to create the new Ringerike, Asker og Bærum District Court. (This was short-lived because in 2025, that new court was divided and Ringerike was moved to the new Ringerike og Hallingdal District Court).
