= Kongsberg og Eiker District Court =

Former district court in Norway

- Kongsberg og Eiker tingrett
- 59°40′14″N 9°39′06″E
- Established: 1 July 2016
- Dissolved: 26 April 2021
- Jurisdiction: Southern Buskerud
- Location: Kongsberg, Norway
- Coordinates: 59°40′14″N 9°39′06″E
- Appeals to: Borgarting Court of Appeal

Kongsberg og Eiker District Court (Norwegian: Kongsberg og Eiker tingrett) was a district court in Buskerud county, Norway. The court was based at two courthouses in Kongsberg and Hokksund. The court existed from 2016 until 2021. Cases from this court could be appealed to Borgarting Court of Appeal. The court had jurisdiction over 8 municipalities (originally 9 municipalities, but in 2020, Nedre Eiker Municipality merged into Drammen Municipality and therefore became part of the Drammen District Court).

- The courthouse in Hokksund accepted cases from the municipalities of Krødsherad, Modum, Sigdal, and Øvre Eiker.
- The courthouse in Kongsberg accepted cases from the municipalities of Flesberg, Kongsberg, Nore og Uvdal, and Rollag.

The court was a court of first instance. Its judicial duties were mainly to settle criminal cases and to resolve civil litigation as well as bankruptcy. The administration and registration tasks of the court included death registration, issuing certain certificates, performing duties of a notary public, and officiating civil wedding ceremonies. Cases from this court were heard by a combination of professional judges and lay judges.

== History ==
This court was created on 1 July 2016, when the old Kongsberg District Court and Eiker, Modum og Sigdal District Court were merged. On 26 April 2021, Kongsberg og Eiker District Court was merged with the Drammen District Court and Hallingdal District Court to create the new Buskerud District Court.
