= Halden District Court =

Former district court in Norway

- Halden tingrett
- 59°07′11″N 11°23′18″E
- Established: 1591
- Dissolved: 21 April 2021
- Jurisdiction: Southeastern Østfold
- Location: Halden, Norway
- Coordinates: 59°07′11″N 11°23′18″E
- Appeals to: Borgarting Court of Appeal

Halden District Court (Norwegian: Halden tingrett) was a district court in southeastern Østfold county, Norway. The court was based in Halden. The court existed until 2021. It had jurisdiction over Aremark Municipality and Halden Municipality. Cases from this court could be appealed to Borgarting Court of Appeal.

The court was a court of first instance. Its judicial duties were mainly to settle criminal cases and to resolve civil litigation as well as bankruptcy. The administration and registration tasks of the court included death registration, issuing certain certificates, performing duties of a notary public, and officiating civil wedding ceremonies. Cases from this court were heard by a combination of professional judges and lay judges.

== History ==
=== Idd og Marker District Court ===
The court was created in 1591, but at that time it was called Idd og Marker District Court. Originally, it included Aremark, Idd, Rødenes, and part of Berg. In 1678, the rest of Berg and the Skjeberg area were moved to this court's jurisdiction. Also in 1678, the Rødenes area was moved to the neighboring Rakkestad District Court. In 1796, the Fredrikshald city court was incorporated into Idd og Marker District Court.

On 24 August 1933, Skjeberg Municipality was transferred to the Tune District Court. From 1952-1964, the Degernes area part of this court's jurisdiction (it was part of Rakkestad District Court before and after that time. On 1 January 1964, Rødenes Municipality became part of the Heggen og Frøland District Court.

=== Halden District Court ===
On 1 January 1967, after a large municipal merger, the name of the court was changed to Halden District Court.

On 26 April 2021, Halden District Court was merged with the Fredrikstad District Court, Moss District Court, and Sarpsborg District Court to create the new Søndre Østfold District Court.
