= Trondenes District Court =

District court in Harstad, Troms, Norway

- Trondenes tingrett
- 68.8008°N 16.54095°E
- Established: 1 January 1917
- Dissolved: 26 April 2021
- Jurisdiction: Southern Troms
- Location: Harstad, Norway
- Coordinates: 68.8008°N 16.54095°E
- Appeals to: Hålogaland Court of Appeal

Division map
- Trondenes District Court included the blue areas in Troms county

Trondenes District Court (Norwegian: Trondenes tingrett) was a district court located in the town of Harstad in Troms county, Norway. The court served the southwestern part of the county which included the municipalities of Harstad, Kvæfjord, Skånland, and Ibestad. The court was subordinate to the Hålogaland Court of Appeal. The court was led by the chief judge (Sorenskriver) Kirsti Ramberg. This court employed a chief judge and two other judges.

The court was a court of first instance. Its judicial duties were mainly to settle criminal cases and to resolve civil litigation as well as bankruptcy. The administration and registration tasks of the court included death registration, issuing certain certificates, performing duties of a notary public, and officiating civil wedding ceremonies. Cases from this court were heard by a combination of professional judges and lay judges.

== History ==
The Trondenes District Court was established on 1 January 1917 when it was split off from the Senja District Court. On 26 April 2021, Trondenes District Court was merged with the Ofoten District Court and Vesterålen District Court to create the new Midtre Hålogaland District Court.
