= Hammerfest District Court =

District court in Hammerfest, Norway

- Hammerfest tingrett
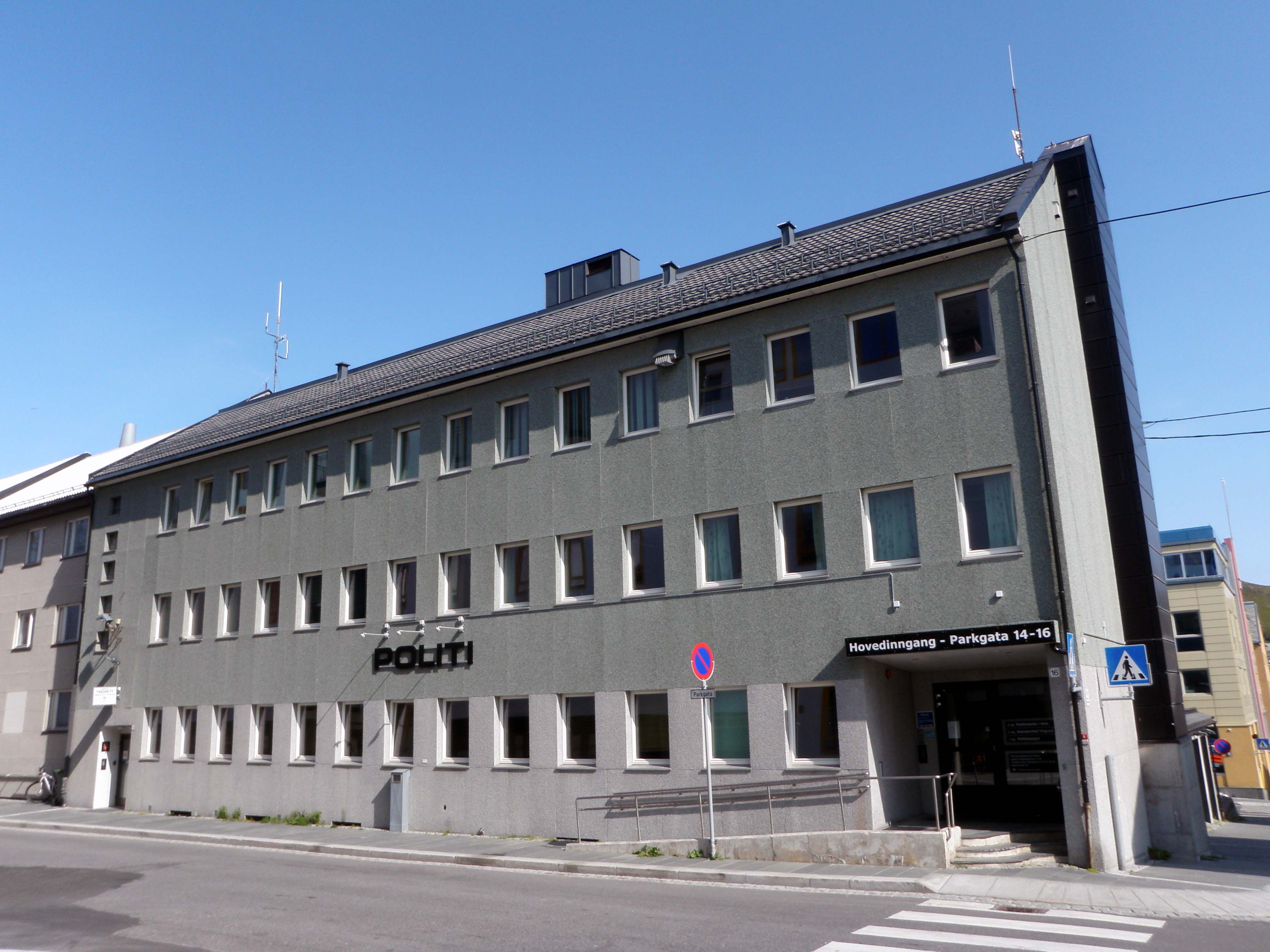
- Hammerfest District Court is co-located with Hammerfest Police Station, the court's entrance on the left
- 70.663383°N 23.67968°E
- Dissolved: 26 April 2021
- Jurisdiction: Northern Finnmark
- Location: Hammerfest, Norway
- Coordinates: 70.663383°N 23.67968°E
- Appeals to: Hålogaland Court of Appeal

Hammerfest District Court (Norwegian: Hammerfest tingrett) was a district court based in the town of Hammerfest in Finnmark county, Norway. The court served the northern part of the county which included Hammerfest Municipality, Hasvik Municipality, Måsøy Municipality, and Nordkapp Municipality. The court was subordinate to the Hålogaland Court of Appeal. The court was led by the chief judge (Sorenskriver) Anders Flock Bachmann. This court employed a chief judge, two other judges and three prosecutors.

The court was a court of first instance. Its judicial duties were mainly to settle criminal cases and to resolve civil litigation as well as bankruptcy. The administration and registration tasks of the court included death registration, issuing certain certificates, performing duties of a notary public, and officiating civil wedding ceremonies. Cases from this court were heard by a combination of professional judges and lay judges.

== History ==
On 26 April 2021, the court was merged with the Alta District Court to create the new Vestre Finnmark District Court. At the same time, the court's jurisdiction was enlarged by adding Kvænangen Municipality in from the Nord-Troms District Court judicial region as well.
