= Alta District Court =

District court in Alta, Norway

- Alta tingrett
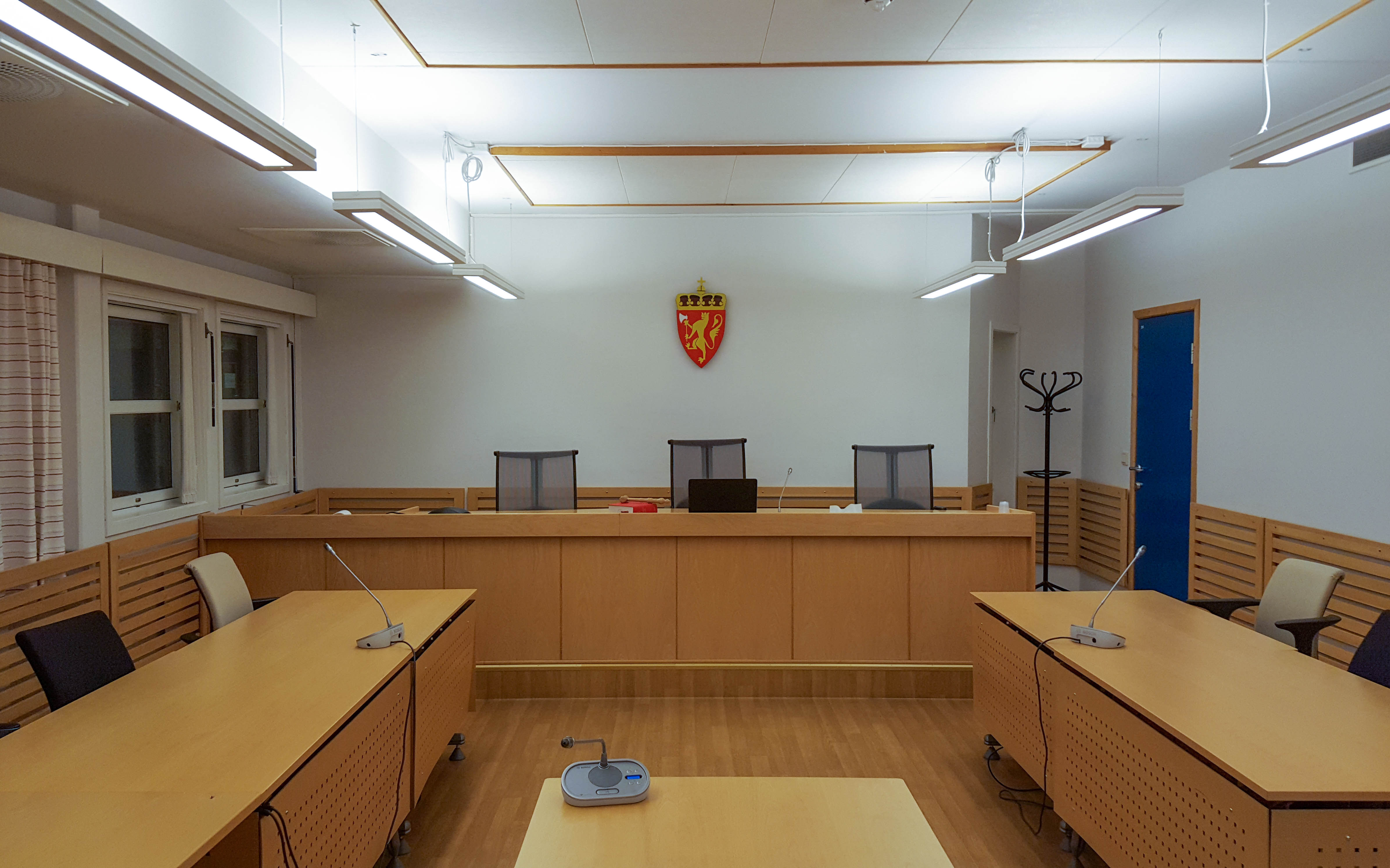
- View inside the court
- 69.96625°N 23.274919°E
- Dissolved: 26 April 2021
- Jurisdiction: Alta and Loppa
- Location: Alta, Norway
- Coordinates: 69.96625°N 23.274919°E
- Appeals to: Hålogaland Court of Appeal

Alta District Court (Norwegian: Alta tingrett) was the district court based in the town of Alta in Finnmark county, Norway. The court served Alta Municipality and Loppa Municipality. The court was subordinate to the Hålogaland Court of Appeal. The court was led by the chief judge (Sorenskriver) Bjørnar K. Leistad. This court employed a chief judge, another judge and four prosecutors.

The court was a court of first instance. Its judicial duties were mainly to settle criminal cases and to resolve civil litigation as well as bankruptcy. The administration and registration tasks of the court included death registration, issuing certain certificates, performing duties of a notary public, and officiating civil wedding ceremonies. Cases from this court were heard by a combination of professional judges and lay judges.

== History ==
On 26 April 2021, the court was merged with the Hammerfest District Court to create the new Vestre Finnmark District Court. At the same time, the court's jurisdiction was enlarged by adding Kvænangen Municipality from the Nord-Troms District Court judicial region as well.
