= Drammen District Court =

Former district court in Norway

- Drammen tingrett
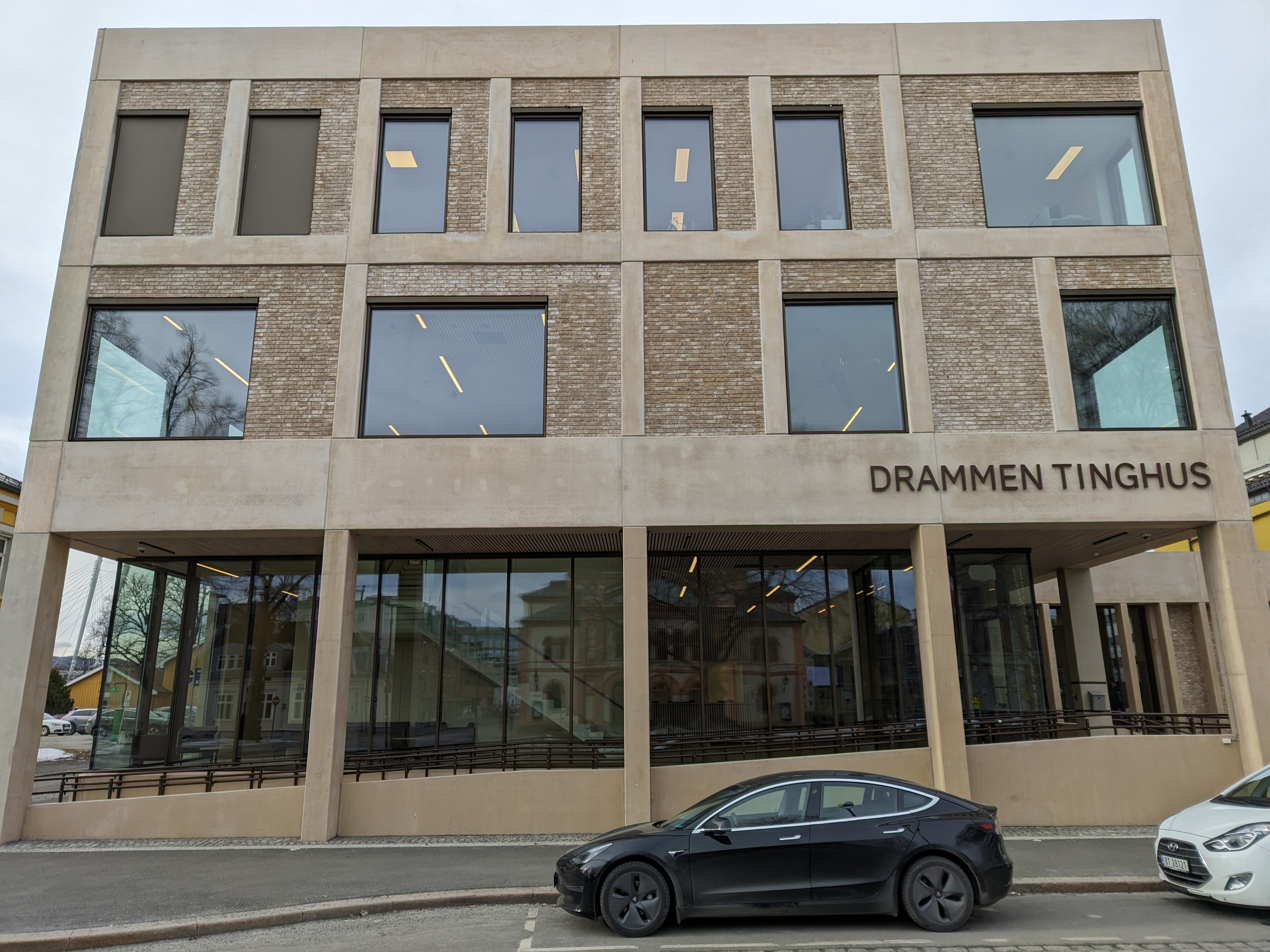
- Courthouse in Drammen
- 59°44′42″N 10°11′56″E
- Established: 30 August 1662
- Dissolved: 26 April 2021
- Jurisdiction: Buskerud/Vestfold
- Location: Drammen, Norway
- Coordinates: 59°44′42″N 10°11′56″E
- Appeals to: Borgarting Court of Appeal

Drammen District Court (Norwegian: Drammen tingrett) was a district court in southeastern Buskerud and northeastern Vestfold counties in Norway. The court was based in Drammen. The court existed until 2021. It had jurisdiction over the municipalities of Drammen, Lier, Sande, and Svelvik. Cases from this court could be appealed to Borgarting Court of Appeal.

The court was a court of first instance. Its judicial duties were mainly to settle criminal cases and to resolve civil litigation as well as bankruptcy. The administration and registration tasks of the court included death registration, issuing certain certificates, performing duties of a notary public, and officiating civil wedding ceremonies. Cases from this court were heard by a combination of professional judges and lay judges.

== History ==
The court was created on 30 August 1662, when King Frederik III created the new Bragernes District Court. It originally had jurisdiction over the towns of Strømsø and Bragernes. In 1811, the two towns were merged into the modern-day town of Drammen. In 1964, Skoger Municipality became part of Drammen Municipality which expanded the area of this court's jurisdiction. In 1970, the name of the court was changed to Drammen District Court.

In 1991, the old Lier, Røyken og Hurum District Court was merged into this court, which added Lier Municipality, Hurum Municipality, and Røyken Municipality to this court's jurisdiction. In 2005, Sande Municipality and Svelvik Municipality were transferred to the Drammen District Court when the old Holmestrand District Court was dissolved. In 2020, Hurum Municipality and Røyken Municipality became part of Asker Municipality, therefore they were moved under the jurisdiction of the Asker og Bærum District Court.

On 26 April 2021, Drammen District Court was merged with the Kongsberg og Eiker District Court and Hallingdal District Court to create the new Buskerud District Court.
