= Rana District Court =

District court in Rana, Norway

- Rana tingrett Nordre Helgeland sorenskriveri (historic)
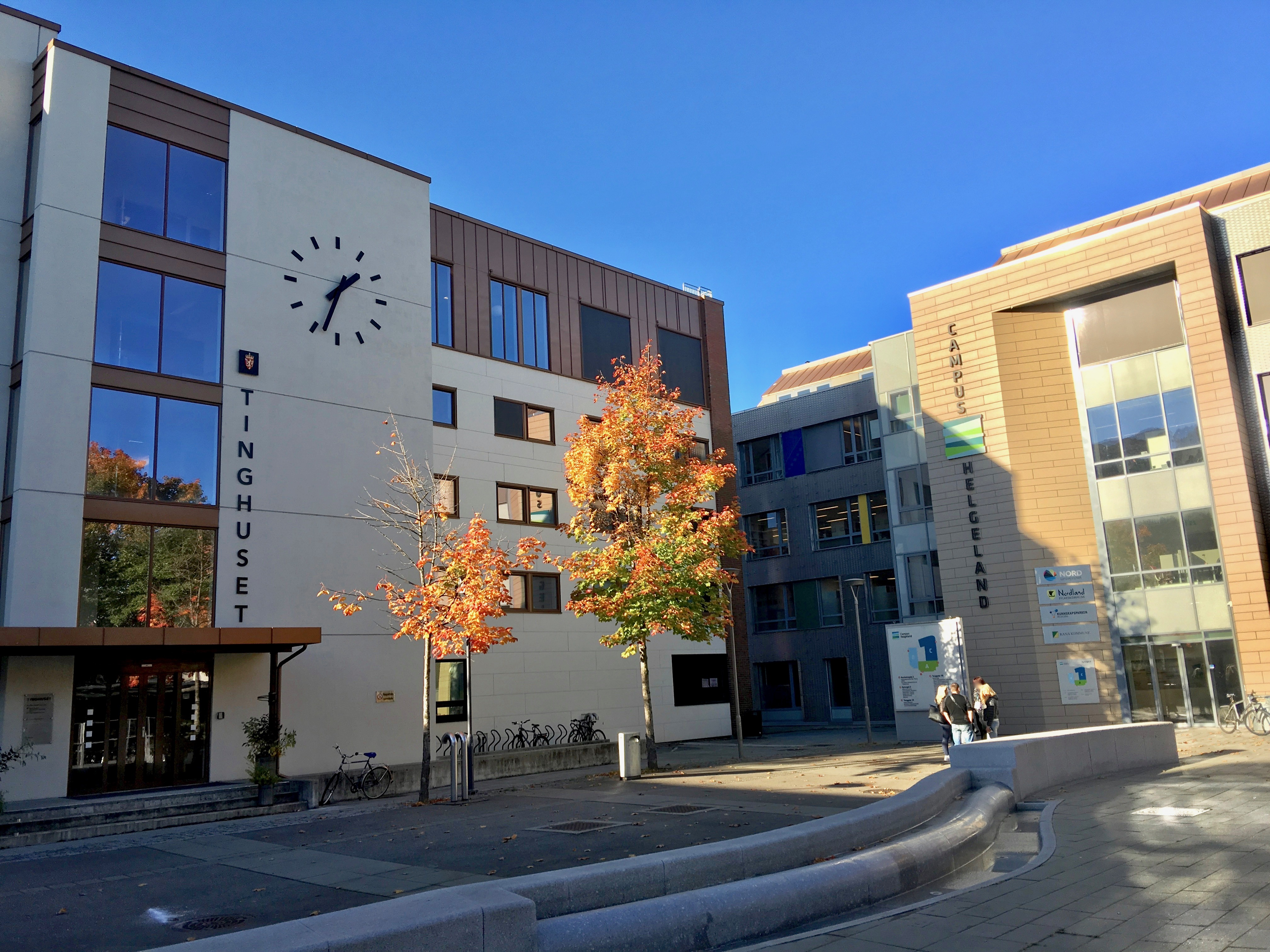
- View of the courthouse
- 66.31104°N 14.13789°E
- Established: 1859
- Dissolved: 26 April 2021
- Jurisdiction: Northern Helgeland, Norway
- Location: Mo i Rana
- Coordinates: 66.31104°N 14.13789°E
- Appeals to: Hålogaland Court of Appeal

Division map
- Rana District Court covered the lower pink areas in Nordland county

Rana District Court (Norwegian: Rana tingrett) was a district court in Nordland county, Norway. The court was based in the town of Mo i Rana. The court existed from 1859 until 2021. It served the central part of the county which included the municipalities of Rana, Hemnes, Nesna, Lurøy, Træna, and Rødøy. Cases from this court could be appealed to Hålogaland Court of Appeal. The court was led by the chief judge (Sorenskriver) Rolf Selfors, who also lead the neighboring Alstahaug District Court and Brønnøy District Court at the time of the court's dissolution. This court employed a chief judge, two other judges, and two prosecutors.

The court was a court of first instance. Its judicial duties were mainly to settle criminal cases and to resolve civil litigation as well as bankruptcy. The administration and registration tasks of the court included death registration, issuing certain certificates, performing duties of a notary public, and officiating civil wedding ceremonies. Cases from this court were heard by a combination of professional judges and lay judges.

== History ==
This district court (originally named Nordre Helgeland District Court was established in 1859 when the geographical jurisdiction of the old Helgeland District Court was divided into two: Søndre Helgeland District Court in the south and Nordre Helgeland District Court in the north. In 1919, the name of the court was changed to Rana District Court. On 26 April 2021, the court was merged with the Alstahaug District Court and Brønnøy District Court to create the new Helgeland District Court.
