= Lofoten District Court =

District court in Lofoten, Norway

- Lofoten tingrett
- 68.23267°N 14.56203°E
- Dissolved: 26 April 2021
- Jurisdiction: Lofoten, Norway
- Location: Svolvær
- Coordinates: 68.23267°N 14.56203°E
- Appeals to: Hålogaland Court of Appeal

Division map
- Lofoten District Court covered the upper green areas in Nordland county

Lofoten District Court (Norwegian: Lofoten tingrett) was a district court in Nordland county, Norway. The court was based in the town of Svolvær. The court existed until 2021. It served the municipalities of Flakstad, Moskenes, Vestvågøy, and Vågan which are all located in the Lofoten archipelago. Cases from this court could be appealed to Hålogaland Court of Appeal. The court was led by the chief judge (Sorenskriver) Ingrid Johanne Lillevik. This court employed a chief judge, one other judge, and two prosecutors.

The court was a court of first instance. Its judicial duties were mainly to settle criminal cases and to resolve civil litigation as well as bankruptcy. The administration and registration tasks of the court included death registration, issuing certain certificates, performing duties of a notary public, and officiating civil wedding ceremonies. Cases from this court were heard by a combination of professional judges and lay judges.

== History ==
On 26 April 2021, the court was merged with the Salten District Court to create the new Salten og Lofoten District Court.
