= Alstahaug District Court =

District court in Alstahaug, Norway

- Alstahaug tingrett Søndre Helgeland sorenskriveri (historic)
- 66.0228878°N 12.637066°E
- Established: 1859
- Dissolved: 26 April 2021
- Jurisdiction: Central Helgeland, Norway
- Location: Sandnessjøen
- Coordinates: 66.0228878°N 12.637066°E
- Appeals to: Hålogaland Court of Appeal

Division map
- Alstahaug District Court covered the lower green areas in Nordland county. The yellow area (Brønnøy District Court) was separated from Alstahaug Court in 1919.

Alstahaug District Court (Norwegian: Alstahaug tingrett) was a district court in Nordland county, Norway. The court was based in the town of Sandnessjøen. The court existed from 1859 until 2021. It served the municipalities of Alstahaug, Dønna, Grane, Hattfjelldal, Herøy, Leirfjord, and Vefsn. Cases from this court could be appealed to Hålogaland Court of Appeal. The court was led by the chief judge (Sorenskriver) Rolf Selfors, who also lead the neighboring Rana District Court and Brønnøy District Court at the time of the court's dissolution. This court employed a chief judge and three other judges.

The court was a court of first instance. Its judicial duties were mainly to settle criminal cases and to resolve civil litigation as well as bankruptcy. The administration and registration tasks of the court included death registration, issuing certain certificates, performing duties of a notary public, and officiating civil wedding ceremonies. Cases from this court were heard by a combination of professional judges and lay judges.

== History ==
This district court (originally named Søndre Helgeland District Court was established in 1859 when the geographical jurisdiction of the old Helgeland District Court was divided into two: Søndre Helgeland District Court in the south and Nordre Helgeland District Court in the north. On 11 July 1919, the southern part of the jurisdictional area was separated to become the Brønnøy District Court. On 26 April 2021, the court was merged with the Brønnøy District Court and Rana District Court to create the new Helgeland District Court.
