= Brønnøy =

Brønnøy may refer to:

== Places ==
- Brønnøy Municipality, a municipality in Nordland county, Norway
- Brønnøy Church, a church in Brønnøy Municipality in Nordland county, Norway
- Brønnøy Airport, an airport in Brønnøy Municipality in Nordland county, Norway
- Brønnøya, an island in Asker Municipality in Akershus county, Norway

== Other ==
- Brønnøy dialect, a dialect of the Norwegian language
- Brønnøy District Court, a former district court in Norway
