= Øst-Finnmark District Court =

Former district court in Norway

- Øst-Finnmark tingrett
- 70.07373°N 29.75122°E
- Established: 1 January 2004
- Dissolved: 26 April 2021
- Jurisdiction: Øst-Finnmark
- Location: Vadsø, Norway
- Coordinates: 70.07373°N 29.75122°E
- Appeals to: Hålogaland Court of Appeal

Øst-Finnmark District Court (Norwegian: Øst-Finnmark tingrett) was a district court located in the town of Vadsø in Finnmark county, Norway. The court served the eastern part of the county which includes the municipalities of Berlevåg, Båtsfjord, Gamvik, Lebesby, Sør-Varanger, Vadsø, and Vardø. The court was subordinate to the Hålogaland Court of Appeal. The court was led by the chief judge (Sorenskriver) Steinar Langholm. This court employed a chief judge, three other judges, and five prosecutors.

The court was a court of first instance. Its judicial duties were mainly to settle criminal cases and to resolve civil litigation as well as bankruptcy. The administration and registration tasks of the court included death registration, issuing certain certificates, performing duties of a notary public, and officiating civil wedding ceremonies. Cases from this court were heard by a combination of professional judges and lay judges.

== History ==
The Øst-Finnmark District Court was established on 1 January 2004 when the old Tana og Varanger District Court and Vardø District Court were merged. On 26 April 2021, the court was merged with the Indre Finnmark District Court to create the new Indre og Østre Finnmark District Court.
