= Court of appeal (Norway) =

Appeal court in Norway

The court of appeal (Norwegian: lagmannsrett, lit. 'lawman's court') is the second level of courts of justice in Norway, reviewing criminal and civil cases appealed from the district courts. There are six courts of appeal, each covering a jurisdiction and based in a city. Each court is led by a senior judge president (førstelagmann) and several appellate judges (lagdommer). The courts are administered by the Norwegian National Courts Administration. Decisions from civil and criminal matters, except the question of guilt, can be appealed from the courts of appeal to the Supreme Court.

== Criminal cases ==
In criminal cases, the court consists of two professional judges and five lay judges; all seven have equal votes in the decisions. In order to convict, five of the seven judges must vote for conviction, including at least one of the two professional judges.

Even if the bench is reduced because of a recusal, the requirement for five guilty votes remains.

Lay judges are members of the public without legal qualifications, who are appointed for periods of four years by the city and county councils.

== Civil cases ==
In civil cases, the court will consists of three judicial judges, though two or four lay judges may be appointed in certain cases.

== Courts ==
There are six courts of appeal:

- Agder, based in Skien, serves the counties of Agder (except Sirdal Municipality), Telemark, and Vestfold.
- Borgarting, based in Oslo, serves the counties of Oslo (including Bouvet Island), Buskerud, Østfold and parts of Akershus west and south of Oslo.
- Eidsivating, based in Hamar, serves the counties of Innlandet and parts of Akershus east of Oslo.
- Frostating, based in Trondheim, serves the counties of Møre og Romsdal and Trøndelag.
- Gulating, based in Bergen, serves the counties of Vestland, Rogaland, and Sirdal Municipality in Agder.
- Hålogaland, based in Tromsø, serves the counties of Nordland (including Jan Mayen), Troms, and Finnmark (including Svalbard).

== History ==
The court system in Norway dates back to about 950, when the things were created as assembly of the great farmers to set laws and convict people of breaching them. These main things were Borgarting, Eidsivating, Gulating and Frostating, but many smaller ones existed, and courts could be raised in any, or even multiple things, creating a fog of legal doubt in cases of disagreements. From about 1300 King Håkon V allowed cases to be appealed directly to the king, for final decision. District courts were established transitionally from the old things to bygdeting, consisting of six or twelve lay judges (lagrettemenn) appointed by the king. In 1539, with the removal of the Norwegian Riksråd, a system of herredag was introduced each ten, later three, years. It acted as court of appeal for peasants, and first instance for the nobility. These things met in Oslo, Skien, Stavanger, Bergen and Trondheim; from 1625 only in Oslo and Bergen.

A system of courts with instances, so a case could be appealed, was introduced in 1607. At first there were four levels of court. The district courts remained, but cases could be appealed to appeal judges (lagmann). Further they could be appealed to the herredag, and at last to the king. In 1661, with the introduction of the absolute monarchy, a supreme court was created in Copenhagen, allowing a single and final decision to be made by one court. The following year the district courts were supplemented with the city courts, creating another level under the courts of appeal. The courts of appeal lasted until 1797, when they were removed.

In 1797 four high courts (overrett) were created, replacing the courts of appeal. These were located in Christiania (Oslo), Bergen, Kristiansand and Throndhjem. In 1890 they were reorganized and reduced to only three courts, with Kristiansand losing its seat. The courts of appeal lasted until 1797, when they were removed. At the same time the courts of appeal were reintroduced, and divided into five constitutions.

The high courts remained until 1936, but were limited to only written procedure, while only oral procedure was permitted in the courts of appeal. In addition, the two levels had non-compatible jurisdictions, creating confusion and an unnecessary complexity. With the new system, the court of appeal became the second level for all civil cases, and lesser criminal cases, while they became the first level for serious criminal charges. This was changed in 1995 when all matters were to be handled by the district courts first. At the same time, the Eidsivating Court of Appeal was split in two, with Oppland, Hedmark and northern Akershus being administered from Hamar and taking the name, while the Oslo office took the new name Borgarting.
