= Follo and Nordre Østfold District Court =

First-instance law court in Norway

- Follo og Nordre Østfold tingrett
- Interactive map of Follo and Nordre Østfold; District Court
- 59°42′53″N 10°49′54″E
- Established: 26 April 2021
- Jurisdiction: Follo and North Østfold
- Location: Ski and Mysen, Norway
- Coordinates: 59°42′53″N 10°49′54″E
- Appeals to: Eidsivating Court of Appeal
- Website: Official website

Follo and Nordre Østfold District Court (Norwegian: Follo og Nordre Østfold tingrett) is a district court located in Akershus and Østfold county, Norway. This court is based at two different courthouses which are located in Ski and Mysen. The court serves the eastern part of Akershus county and the northern part of Østfold county. The court is subordinate to the Eidsivating Court of Appeal. The jurisdiction area of the court covers nine municipalities.

- The courthouse in Ski accepts cases from the municipalities of Enebakk, Frogn, Nesodden, Nordre Follo, Vestby, and Ås.
- The courthouse in Mysen accepts cases from the municipalities of Indre Østfold, Marker, and Skiptvet.

The court is led by a chief judge (sorenskriver) and several other judges. The court is a court of first instance. Its judicial duties are mainly to settle criminal cases and to resolve civil litigation as well as bankruptcy. The administration and registration tasks of the court include death registration, issuing certain certificates, performing duties of a notary public, and officiating civil wedding ceremonies. Cases from this court are heard by a combination of professional judges and lay judges.

== History ==
This court was established on 26 April 2021 after the old Follo District Court and Heggen og Frøland District Court were merged into one court. The new district court system continues to use the courthouses from the predecessor courts. When the court was created, the Storting also approved moving these areas from the Borgarting Court of Appeal to the Eidsivating Court of Appeal. This change was not carried out immediately, however, but on 1 March 2022 the change was officially enacted.
