= Salten District Court =

District court in Salten, Norway

- Salten tingrett
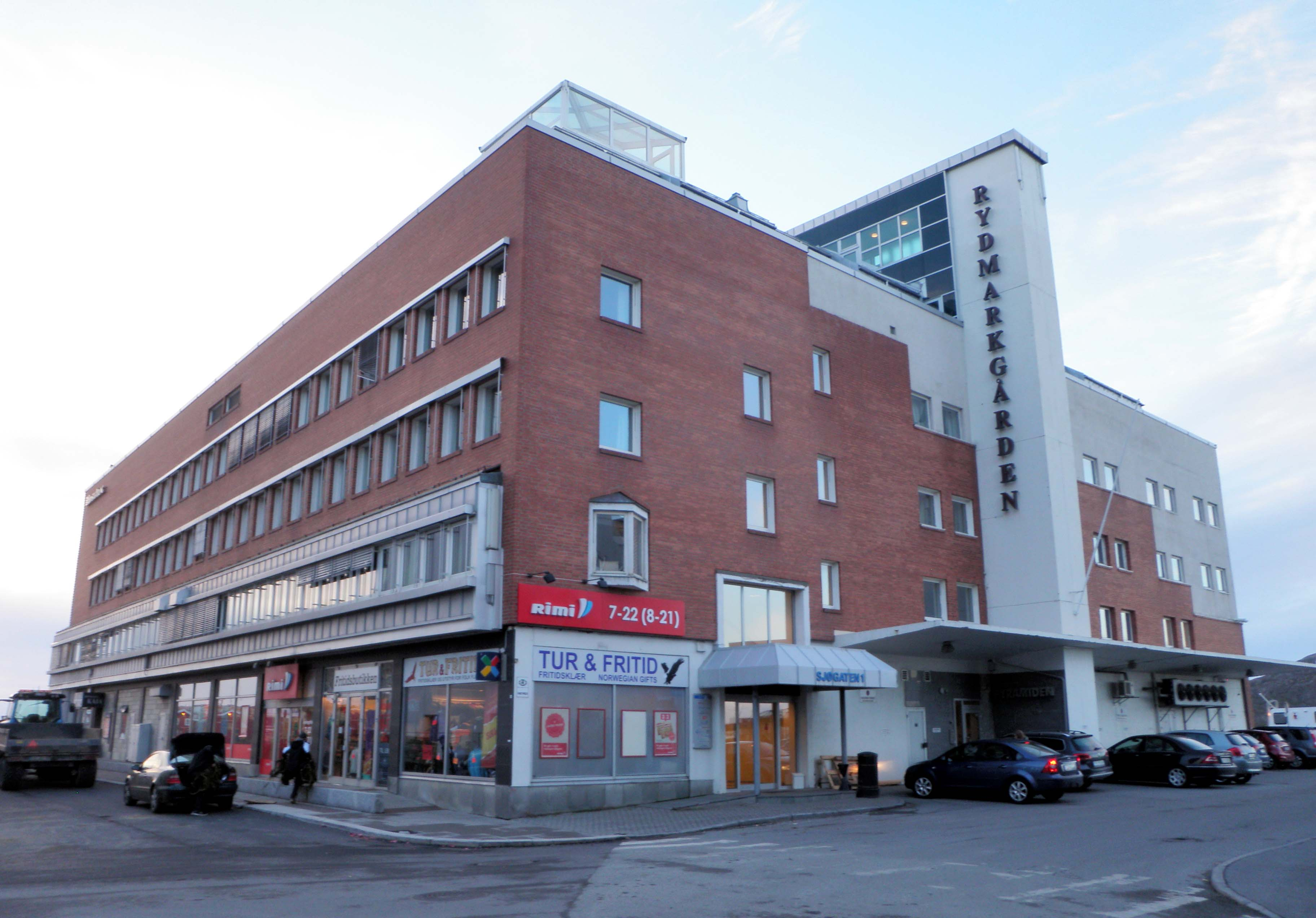
- Courthouse in Bodø
- 67.28320°N 14.37320°E
- Dissolved: 26 April 2021
- Jurisdiction: Salten, Norway
- Location: Bodø
- Coordinates: 67.28320°N 14.37320°E
- Appeals to: Hålogaland Court of Appeal

Division map
- Salten District Court covered the lower blue areas in Nordland county

Salten District Court (Norwegian: Salten tingrett) was a district court in Nordland county, Norway. The court was based in the town of Bodø. The court existed until 2021. It served the Salten area which included the municipalities of Beiarn, Bodø, Fauske, Gildeskål, Meløy, Røst, Saltdal, Steigen, Sørfold, and Værøy. It also held jurisdiction over the outlying territory of Jan Mayen. Cases from this court could be appealed to Hålogaland Court of Appeal. The court was led by the chief judge (Sorenskriver) Ingrid Johanne Lillevik. This court employed a chief judge, four other judges, and four prosecutors.

The court was a court of first instance. Its judicial duties were mainly to settle criminal cases and to resolve civil litigation as well as bankruptcy. The administration and registration tasks of the court included death registration, issuing certain certificates, performing duties of a notary public, and officiating civil wedding ceremonies. Cases from this court were heard by a combination of professional judges and lay judges.

== History ==
On 26 April 2021, the court was merged with the Lofoten District Court to create the new Salten og Lofoten District Court.
