= Eiker, Modum og Sigdal District Court =

Former district court in Norway

- Eiker, Modum og Sigdal tingrett
- 59°46′06″N 9°54′52″E
- Established: 1697
- Dissolved: 1 January 2016
- Jurisdiction: Central Buskerud
- Location: Hokksund, Norway
- Coordinates: 59°46′06″N 9°54′52″E
- Appeals to: Borgarting Court of Appeal

Eiker, Modum og Sigdal District Court (Norwegian: Eiker, Modum og Sigdal tingrett) was a district court in Buskerud county, Norway. The court was based in Hokksund. The court existed until 2016. It had jurisdiction over the municipalities of Krødsherad, Modum, Nedre Eiker, Sigdal, and Øvre Eiker. Cases from this court could be appealed to Borgarting Court of Appeal.

The court was a court of first instance. Its judicial duties were mainly to settle criminal cases and to resolve civil litigation as well as bankruptcy. The administration and registration tasks of the court included death registration, issuing certain certificates, performing duties of a notary public, and officiating civil wedding ceremonies. Cases from this court were heard by a combination of professional judges and lay judges.

== History ==
This court was established in 1697, originally encompassing the Eiker, Modum, and Sigdal areas. In 1885, Eiker was divided into Nedre Eiker Municipality and Øvre Eiker Municipality. In 1901, Sigdal was divided into Sigdal Municipality and Krødsherad Municipality.

On 1 July 2016, Eiker, Modum, og Sigdal District Court was merged with the Kongsberg District Court to create the new Kongsberg og Eiker District Court.
