= Hallingdal District Court =

Former district court in Norway

- Hallingdal tingrett
- 60°34′05″N 9°06′04″E
- Established: 9 August 1825
- Dissolved: 26 April 2021
- Jurisdiction: Hallingdal
- Location: Nesbyen, Norway
- Coordinates: 60°34′05″N 9°06′04″E
- Appeals to: Borgarting Court of Appeal

Hallingdal District Court (Norwegian: Hallingdal tingrett) was a district court in Buskerud county, Norway. The court was based in Nesbyen. The court existed until 2021. It had jurisdiction over the Hallingdal valley which included the municipalities of Flå, Gol, Hemsedal, Hol, Nesbyen, and Ål. Cases from this court could be appealed to Borgarting Court of Appeal.

The court was a court of first instance. Its judicial duties were mainly to settle criminal cases and to resolve civil litigation as well as bankruptcy. The administration and registration tasks of the court included death registration, issuing certain certificates, performing duties of a notary public, and officiating civil wedding ceremonies. Cases from this court were heard by a combination of professional judges and lay judges.

== History ==
The court was created on 9 August 1825 when the old district court covering both Ringerike and Hallingdal was divided into two. On 26 April 2021, Hallingdal District Court was merged with the Drammen District Court and Kongsberg og Eiker District Court to create the new Buskerud District Court.
