= Sarpsborg District Court =

Former district court in Norway

- Sarpsborg tingrett
- 59°17′06″N 11°06′44″E
- Established: 13 May 1952
- Dissolved: 21 April 2021
- Jurisdiction: Southern Østfold
- Location: Sarpsborg, Norway
- Coordinates: 59°17′06″N 11°06′44″E
- Appeals to: Borgarting Court of Appeal

Sarpsborg District Court (Norwegian: Sarpsborg tingrett) was a district court in southern Østfold county, Norway. The court was based in Sarpsborg. The court existed until 2021. It had jurisdiction over Rakkestad Municipality and Sarpsborg Municipality. Cases from this court could be appealed to Borgarting Court of Appeal.

The court was a court of first instance. Its judicial duties were mainly to settle criminal cases and to resolve civil litigation as well as bankruptcy. The administration and registration tasks of the court included death registration, issuing certain certificates, performing duties of a notary public, and officiating civil wedding ceremonies. Cases from this court were heard by a combination of professional judges and lay judges.

== History ==
The court was created on 13 May 1952. It originally had jurisdiction over the town of Sarpsborg and the surrounding Borge Municipality and Torsnes Municipality (they had been removed from the jurisdiction of the Tune District Court). On 9 December 1988, the Tune District Court was dissolved and merged into the Sarpsborg District Court.

On 26 April 2021, Sarpsborg District Court was merged with the Fredrikstad District Court, Halden District Court, and Moss District Court to create the new Søndre Østfold District Court.
