= Indre Finnmark District Court =

District court in Finnmark, Norway

- Indre Finnmark tingrett (Norwegian); Sis-Finnmárkku diggegoddi (Northern Sami)
- 70.20008°N 28.18860°E
- Established: 1 Jan 2004
- Dissolved: 26 April 2021
- Jurisdiction: Southern/Central Finnmark
- Location: Tana bru, Norway
- Coordinates: 70.20008°N 28.18860°E
- Appeals to: Hålogaland Court of Appeal

Indre Finnmark District Court (Norwegian: Indre Finnmark tingrett or Northern Sami: Sis-Finnmárkku diggegoddi) was a district court in Finnmark county, Norway. The court was based in the village of Tana Bru. The court existed from 2004 until 2021. It served the municipalities of Nesseby, Tana, Karasjok, Porsanger and Kautokeino. Cases from this court could be appealed to Hålogaland Court of Appeal. The court was led by the chief judge (Sorenskriver) Finn-Arne Schanche Selfors. This court also had two other judges, three prosecutors, and one linguist to help with the bilingual nature of this court.

This court was officially bilingual in that all work (oral or written) could be done in either the Norwegian language or the Northern Sami language. The court had an additional responsibility (based on section 110 of the Constitution of Norway) that other district courts did not have: to protect the customs and identity of the Sami people as well as the rights of Sami-speaking people to have the full access of the law in this court.

The court was a court of first instance. Its judicial duties were mainly to settle criminal cases and to resolve civil litigation as well as bankruptcy. The administration and registration tasks of the court included death registration, issuing certain certificates, performing duties of a notary public, and officiating civil wedding ceremonies. Cases from this court were heard by a combination of professional judges and lay judges.

== History ==
The court was established on 1 January 2004 and its official opening was on 23 June 2004. The court was established by a recommendation to support the Sami language-speaking region of Finnmark. On 26 April 2021, the court was merged with the Øst-Finnmark District Court to create the new Indre og Østre Finnmark District Court.
