= Moss District Court =

Former district court in Norway

- Moss tingrett
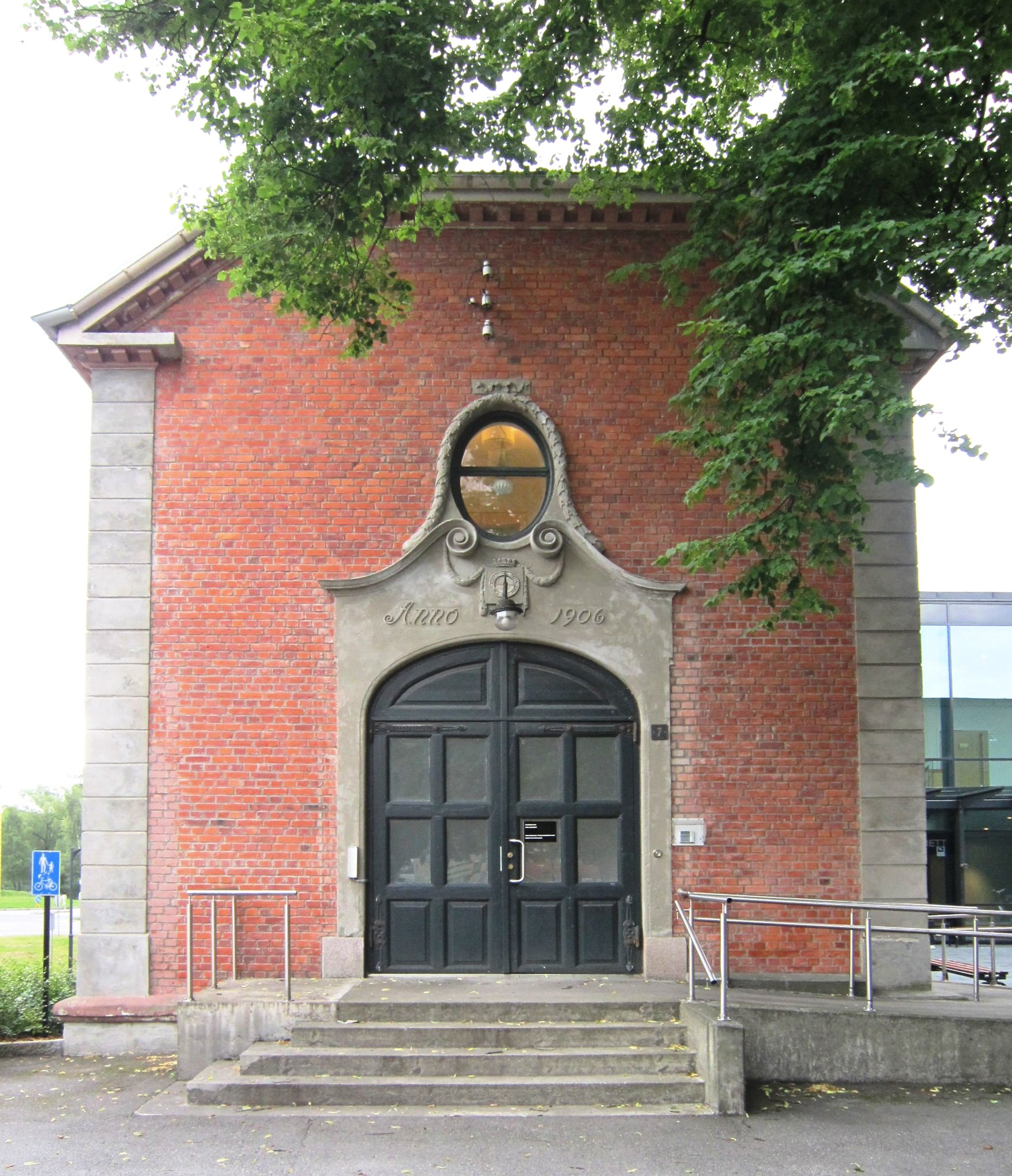
- Courthouse in Moss
- 59°26′09″N 10°40′13″E
- Established: 1591
- Dissolved: 21 April 2021
- Jurisdiction: Western Østfold
- Location: Moss, Norway
- Coordinates: 59°26′09″N 10°40′13″E
- Appeals to: Borgarting Court of Appeal

Moss District Court (Norwegian: Moss tingrett) was a district court in western Østfold county, Norway. The court was based in Moss. The court existed until 2021. It had jurisdiction over Moss Municipality, Råde Municipality, and Våler Municipality (before merging with Moss Municipality in 2020, Rygge Municipality was part of this court's jurisdiction too). Cases from this court could be appealed to Borgarting Court of Appeal.

The court was a court of first instance. Its judicial duties were mainly to settle criminal cases and to resolve civil litigation as well as bankruptcy. The administration and registration tasks of the court included death registration, issuing certain certificates, performing duties of a notary public, and officiating civil wedding ceremonies. Cases from this court were heard by a combination of professional judges and lay judges.

== History ==
The court was created in 1591 and it had jurisdiction over Hobøl (Mossedal). In 1674, Råde, Rygge, and Våler were added to the jurisdiction of this court. In 1842, the Onsøy area was transferred from the Tune District Court to this court. From 1905-1952, the Spydeberg and Skiptvet areas were added to this court's jurisdiction.

On 26 April 2021, Moss District Court was merged with the Fredrikstad District Court, Halden District Court, and Sarpsborg District Court to create the new Søndre Østfold District Court.
