= Ofoten District Court =

District court in Narvik, Norway

- Ofoten tingrett
- 68.43946°N 17.4305°E
- Dissolved: 26 April 2021
- Jurisdiction: Ofoten, Norway
- Location: Narvik
- Coordinates: 68.43946°N 17.4305°E
- Appeals to: Hålogaland Court of Appeal

Division map
- Ofoten District Court included the pink areas (top of map) in Nordland county, plus three municipalities to the north in Troms county (not on map)

Ofoten District Court (Norwegian: Ofoten tingrett) was a district court in Nordland county (and a small part of Troms) in Norway. The court was based in the town of Narvik. The court existed until 2021. The court served the northeastern part of the Nordland county and a small part of south-central Troms county. It included the municipalities of Evenes, Hamarøy, Lødingen, Narvik, and Tjeldsund in Nordland plus Gratangen, Lavangen, and Salangen in Troms. Cases from this court could be appealed to Hålogaland Court of Appeal. The court was led by the chief judge (Sorenskriver) Arne Eirik Kirkerud. The judicial staff consisted of one chief judge, two appointed professional judges, and one deputy judge. The chief judge was the president of the district court. He led the administration of the staff and appointed deputy judges for a period of up to three years. The judges divided their time approximately equally between criminal cases and civil cases.

The court was a court of first instance. Its judicial duties were mainly to settle criminal cases and to resolve civil litigation as well as bankruptcy. The administration and registration tasks of the court included death registration, issuing certain certificates, performing duties of a notary public, and officiating civil wedding ceremonies. Cases from this court were heard by a combination of professional judges and lay judges.

== History ==
On 26 April 2021, the court was merged with the Vesterålen District Court and Trondenes District Court to create the new Midtre Hålogaland District Court.
