= Nord-Troms and Senja District Court =

First-instance law court in Norway

- Nord-Troms og Senja tingrett
- Interactive map of Nord-Troms and Senja; District Court
- 69°39′17″N 18°57′54″E
- Established: 26 April 2021
- Jurisdiction: North Troms and Senja, Norway
- Location: Tromsø and Finnsnes
- Coordinates: 69°39′17″N 18°57′54″E
- Appeals to: Hålogaland Court of Appeal
- Website: Official website

Nord-Troms and Senja District Court (Norwegian: Nord-Troms og Senja tingrett) is a district court located in Troms county, Norway. This court is based at two different courthouses which are located in Tromsø and Finnsnes. The court is subordinate to the Hålogaland Court of Appeal. The court serves the northern and central parts of Troms county which includes cases from 13 municipalities as follows:

- The courthouse in Tromsø accepts cases from the municipalities of Balsfjord, Karlsøy, Kåfjord, Lyngen, Nordreisa, Skjervøy, Storfjord, and Tromsø.
- The courthouse in Finnsnes accepts cases from the municipalities of Bardu, Dyrøy, Målselv, Senja, and Sørreisa.

The court is led by a chief judge (sorenskriver) and several other judges. The court is a court of first instance. Its judicial duties are mainly to settle criminal cases and to resolve civil litigation as well as bankruptcy. The administration and registration tasks of the court include death registration, issuing certain certificates, performing duties of a notary public, and officiating civil wedding ceremonies. Cases from this court are heard by a combination of professional judges and lay judges.

== History ==
This court was established on 26 April 2021 after the old Senja District Court and Nord-Troms District Court were merged into one court. Kvænangen Municipality was part of the old Nord-Troms District Court, but on this date it was transferred to the Vestre Finnmark District Court. The new district court system continues to use the courthouses from the predecessor courts.
