= Fredrikstad District Court =

Former district court in Norway

- Fredrikstad tingrett
- 59°12′52″N 10°56′18″E
- Established: 2 February 1979
- Dissolved: 21 April 2021
- Jurisdiction: Southwestern Østfold
- Location: Fredrikstad, Norway
- Coordinates: 59°12′52″N 10°56′18″E
- Appeals to: Borgarting Court of Appeal

Fredrikstad District Court (Norwegian: Fredrikstad tingrett) was a district court in southwestern Østfold county, Norway. The court was based in Fredrikstad. The court existed until 2021. It had jurisdiction over Fredrikstad Municipality and Hvaler Municipality. Cases from this court could be appealed to Borgarting Court of Appeal.

The court was a court of first instance. Its judicial duties were mainly to settle criminal cases and to resolve civil litigation as well as bankruptcy. The administration and registration tasks of the court included death registration, issuing certain certificates, performing duties of a notary public, and officiating civil wedding ceremonies. Cases from this court were heard by a combination of professional judges and lay judges.

== History ==
The court was created on 2 February 1979 when the old Fredrikstad city court and the old Onsøy District Court were merged to form the new Fredrikstad District Court. On 1 January 1994, Borge Municipality was moved from the Sarpsborg District Court to Fredrikstad District Court (because Borge Municipality was merged into Fredrikstad Municipality on that date).

On 26 April 2021, Fredrikstad District Court was merged with the Halden District Court, Moss District Court, and Sarpsborg District Court to create the new Søndre Østfold District Court.
