= Vesterålen District Court =

District court in Vesterålen, Norway

- Vesterålen tingrett
- 68.69508°N 15.41815°E
- Dissolved: 26 April 2021
- Jurisdiction: Vesterålen, Norway
- Location: Torggata 10 A, 8400 Sortland
- Coordinates: 68.69508°N 15.41815°E
- Appeals to: Hålogaland Court of Appeal

Division map
- Vesterålen District Court covered the upper blue areas in Nordland county

Vesterålen District Court (Norwegian: Vesterålen tingrett) was a district court in Nordland county, Norway. The court was based in the town of Sortland. The court existed until 2021. It served the Vesterålen district in the northern part of the county. It included the municipalities of Andøy, Bø i Vesterålen, Hadsel, Sortland, and Øksnes. Cases from this court could be appealed to Hålogaland Court of Appeal. The court was led by the chief judge (Sorenskriver) Hans Edvard Roll. This court employed a chief judge, one other judge, and two prosecutors.

The court was a court of first instance. Its judicial duties were mainly to settle criminal cases and to resolve civil litigation as well as bankruptcy. The administration and registration tasks of the court included death registration, issuing certain certificates, performing duties of a notary public, and officiating civil wedding ceremonies. Cases from this court were heard by a combination of professional judges and lay judges.

== History ==
On 26 April 2021, the court was merged with the Ofoten District Court and Trondenes District Court to create the new Midtre Hålogaland District Court.
