= Kongsberg District Court =

Former district court in Norway

- Kongsberg tingrett
- 59°40′14″N 9°39′06″E
- Established: 1624
- Dissolved: 1 January 2016
- Jurisdiction: Southern Buskerud
- Location: Kongsberg, Norway
- Coordinates: 59°40′14″N 9°39′06″E
- Appeals to: Borgarting Court of Appeal

Kongsberg District Court (Norwegian: Kongsberg tingrett) was a district court in Buskerud county, Norway. The court was based in Kongsberg. The court existed until 2016. It had jurisdiction over the municipalities of Flesberg, Kongsberg, Nore og Uvdal, and Rollag. Cases from this court could be appealed to Borgarting Court of Appeal.

The court was a court of first instance. Its judicial duties were mainly to settle criminal cases and to resolve civil litigation as well as bankruptcy. The administration and registration tasks of the court included death registration, issuing certain certificates, performing duties of a notary public, and officiating civil wedding ceremonies. Cases from this court were heard by a combination of professional judges and lay judges.

== History ==
In 1624, the mining town of Kongsberg was established. Initially, a city court and separate mining court oversaw cases arising within the new town of Kongsberg. The mining court closed in 1812, but the city court continued on, overseeing cases from the town of Kongsberg. On 1 July 1900, the Kongsberg city court was merged into the Numedal og Sandsvær District Court which included the geographical area surrounding Kongsberg. In 1970, the name of the court was changed to Kongsberg District Court.

On 1 July 2016, Kongsberg District Court was merged with the Eiker, Modum og Sigdal District Court to create the new Kongsberg og Eiker District Court.
