= Salten and Lofoten District Court =

First-instance law court in Norway

- Salten og Lofoten tingrett
- Interactive map of Salten and Lofoten; District Court
- 67°16′59″N 14°22′24″E
- Established: 26 April 2021
- Jurisdiction: Salten and Lofoten, Norway
- Location: Bodø and Svolvær
- Coordinates: 67°16′59″N 14°22′24″E
- Appeals to: Hålogaland Court of Appeal
- Website: Official website

Salten and Lofoten District Court (Norwegian: Salten og Lofoten tingrett) is a district court located in Nordland county, Norway. This court is based at two different courthouses which are located in Bodø and Svolvær. The court serves the Salten and Lofoten areas in the county. The court is subordinate to the Hålogaland Court of Appeal. The court's jurisdiction covers cases from 16 municipalities as follows:

- The courthouse in Bodø accepts cases from the municipalities of Beiarn, Bodø, Fauske, Gildeskål, Hamarøy, Meløy, Rødøy, Saltdal, Steigen, and Sørfold.
- The courthouse in Svolvær accepts cases from the municipalities of Vågan, Vestvågøy, Flakstad, Moskenes, Værøy, and Røst.

The court is led by a chief judge (sorenskriver) and several other judges. The court is a court of first instance. Its judicial duties are mainly to settle criminal cases and to resolve civil litigation as well as bankruptcy. The administration and registration tasks of the court include death registration, issuing certain certificates, performing duties of a notary public, and officiating civil wedding ceremonies. Cases from this court are heard by a combination of professional judges and lay judges.

== History ==
This court was established on 26 April 2021 after the old Lofoten District Court and Salten District Court were merged into one court. The new district court system continues to use the courthouses from the predecessor courts.
