= Indre og Østre Finnmark District Court =

First-instance law court in Norway

- Indre og Østre Finnmark tingrett Sis-ja Nuorta-Finnmárkku diggegoddi
- 70°04′25″N 29°45′04″E
- Established: 26 May 2021
- Jurisdiction: East/Central Finnmark, Norway
- Location: Vadsø and Tana Bru
- Coordinates: 70°04′25″N 29°45′04″E
- Appeals to: Hålogaland Court of Appeal
- Website: Official website

Indre og Østre Finnmark District Court (Norwegian: Indre og Østre Finnmark tingrett or Northern Sami: Sis-ja Nuorta-Finnmárkku diggegoddi) is a district court located in Finnmark, Norway. This court is based at two different courthouses which are located in Tana Bru and Vadsø. The court is subordinate to the Hålogaland Court of Appeal. The court serves the central and eastern parts of Finnmark which includes 11 municipalities as follows:

- The courthouse in Tana Bru accepts cases from the municipalities of Karasjok, Kautokeino, Nesseby, and Tana.
- The courthouse in Vadsø accepts cases from the municipalities of Berlevåg, Båtsfjord, Gamvik, Lebesby, Sør-Varanger, Vadsø, and Vardø.

The court is led by a chief judge (sorenskriver) and several other judges. The court is a court of first instance. Its judicial duties are mainly to settle criminal cases and to resolve civil litigation as well as bankruptcy. The administration and registration tasks of the court include death registration, issuing certain certificates, performing duties of a notary public, and officiating civil wedding ceremonies. Cases from this court are heard by a combination of professional judges and lay judges.

== History ==
This court was established on 26 May 2021 after the old Indre Finnmark District Court and Øst-Finnmark District Court were merged into one court. The new district court system continues to use the courthouses from the predecessor courts.
