= Senja District Court =

Former district court in Norway

- Senja tingrett
- 69.2293°N 17.9792°E
- Established: 28 August 1854
- Dissolved: 26 April 2021
- Jurisdiction: Central Troms
- Location: Finnsnes, Norway
- Coordinates: 69.2293°N 17.9792°E
- Appeals to: Hålogaland Court of Appeal

Division map
- Senja District Court covered the green areas in Troms county

Senja District Court (Norwegian: Senja tingrett) was a district court located in the town of Finnsnes in Troms county, Norway. The court served the central and southeastern part of the county which included the municipalities of Bardu, Berg, Dyrøy, Lenvik, Målselv, Torsken, Tranøy, and Sørreisa. The court was subordinate to the Hålogaland Court of Appeal. The court was led by the chief judge (Sorenskriver) Frank Kjetil Olsen. This court employed a chief judge and two other judges.

The court was a court of first instance. Its judicial duties were mainly to settle criminal cases and to resolve civil litigation as well as bankruptcy. The administration and registration tasks of the court included death registration, issuing certain certificates, performing duties of a notary public, and officiating civil wedding ceremonies. Cases from this court were heard by a combination of professional judges and lay judges.

== History ==
The Senja District Court was established on 28 August 1854 when the old Senja og Tromsø District Court was divided into Senja District Court and Tromsø District Court. On 26 April 2021, Senja District Court was merged with the Nord-Troms District Court to create the new Nord-Troms og Senja District Court.
