= Vestre Finnmark District Court =

First-instance law court in Norway

- Vestre Finnmark tingrett
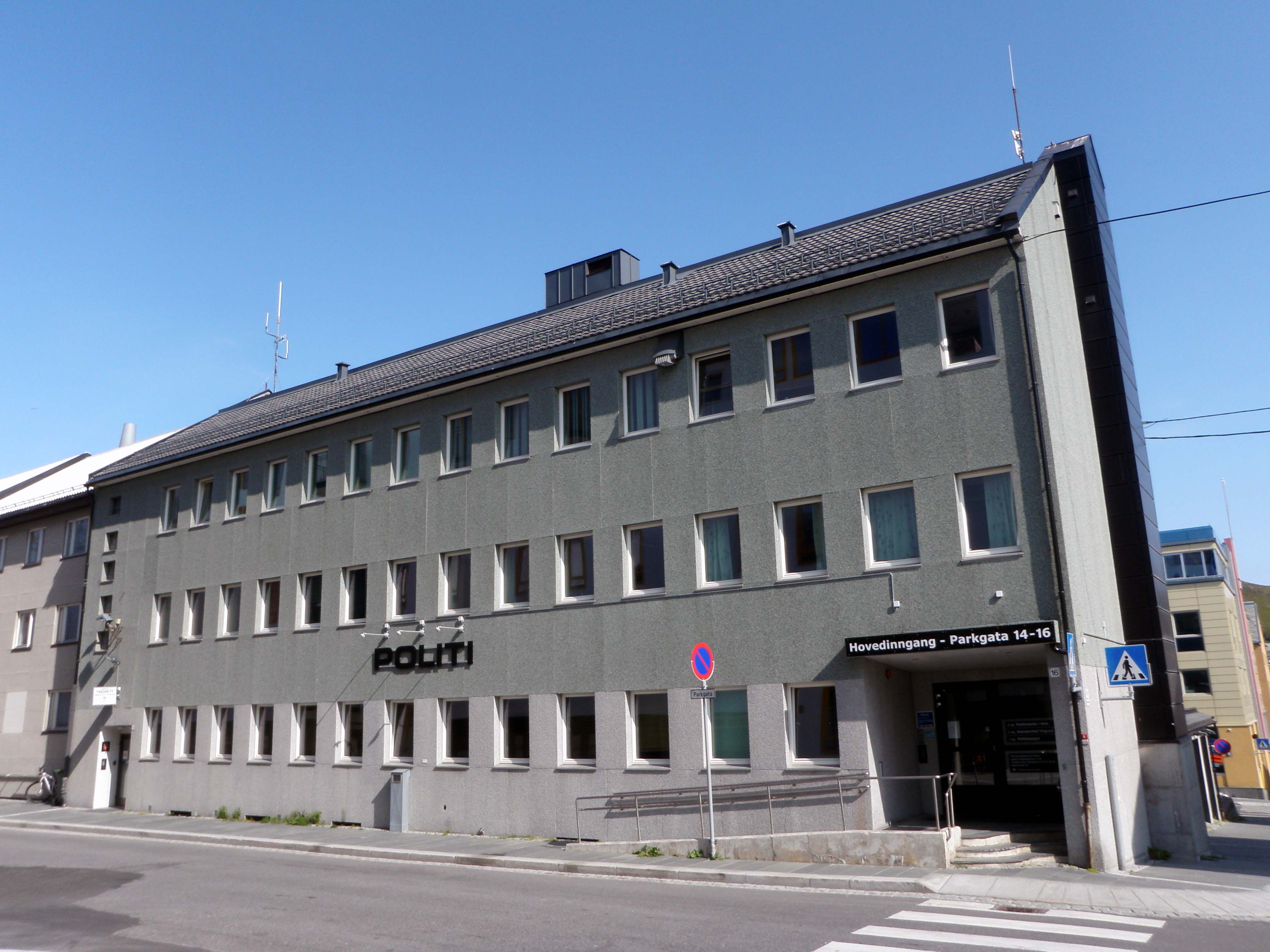
- Courthouse in Hammerfest
- 69°57′57″N 23°16′33″E
- Established: 26 April 2021
- Jurisdiction: Western Finnmark, Norway
- Location: Alta and Hammerfest
- Coordinates: 69°57′57″N 23°16′33″E
- Appeals to: Hålogaland Court of Appeal
- Website: Official website

Vestre Finnmark District Court (Norwegian: Vestre Finnmark tingrett) is a district court located in northern Norway. This court is based at two different courthouses which are located in Alta and Hammerfest. The court is subordinate to the Hålogaland Court of Appeal. The court serves seven municipalities in the eastern part of Finnmark county plus Kvænangen Municipality in Troms county.

- The courthouse in Alta accepts cases from the municipalities of Alta, Loppa, and Kvænangen.
- The courthouse in Hammerfest accepts cases from the municipalities of Hasvik, Hammerfest, Måsøy, Nordkapp, and Porsanger.

The court is led by a chief judge (sorenskriver) and several other judges. The court is a court of first instance. Its judicial duties are mainly to settle criminal cases and to resolve civil litigation as well as bankruptcy. The administration and registration tasks of the court include death registration, issuing certain certificates, performing duties of a notary public, and officiating civil wedding ceremonies. Cases from this court are heard by a combination of professional judges and lay judges.

== History ==
This court was established on 26 April 2021 after the old Alta District Court, Hammerfest District Court, and a small part of Nord-Troms District Court (just Kvænangen Municipality) were all merged into one court. The new district court system continues to use the courthouses from the predecessor courts.
