= Helgeland District Court =

First-instance law court in Norway

- Helgeland tingrett
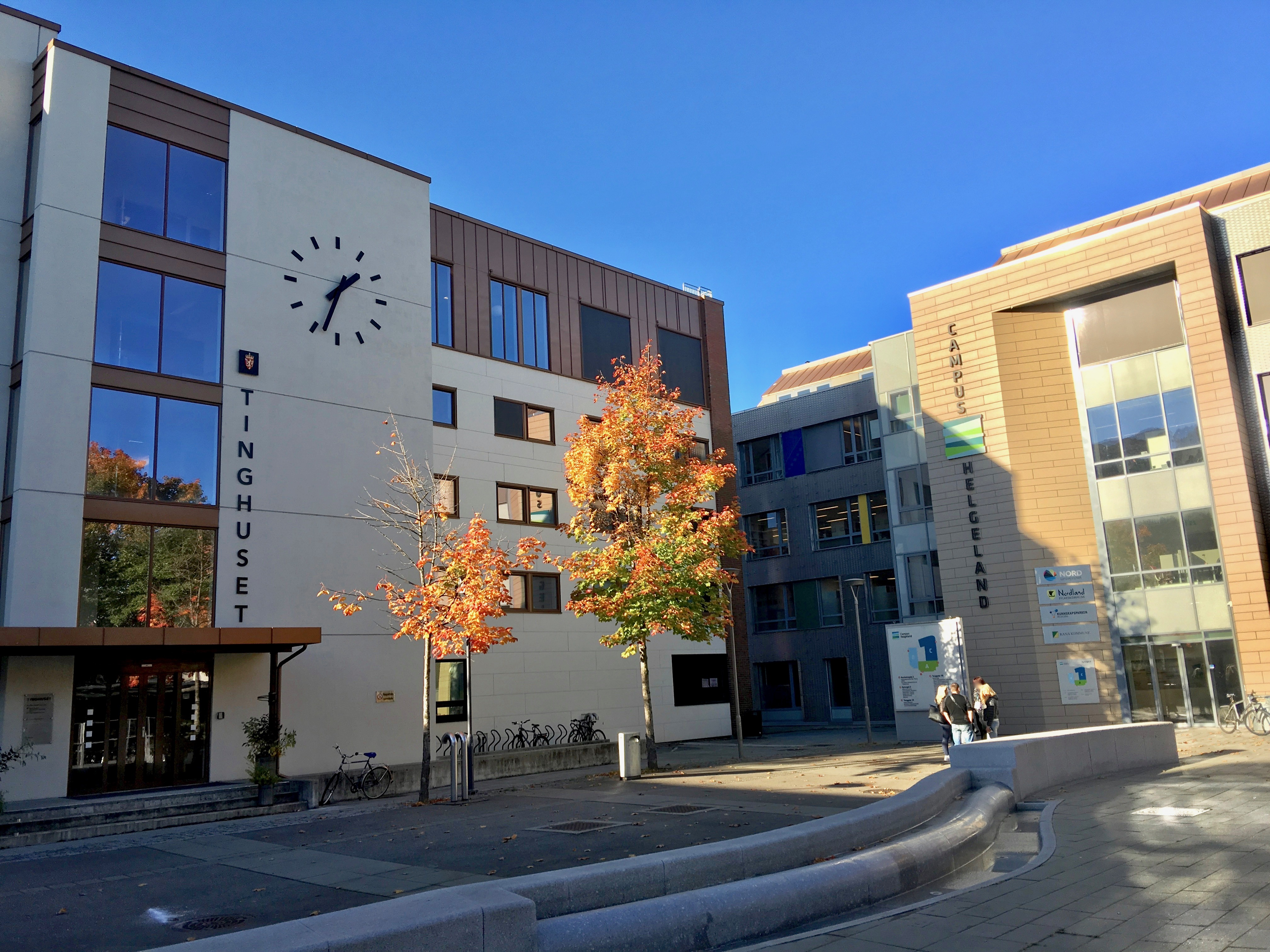
- Courthouse in Mo i Rana
- 66°18′40″N 14°08′16″E
- Established: 26 April 2021
- Jurisdiction: Helgeland, Norway
- Location: Brønnøysund, Mo i Rana, and Sandnessjøen
- Coordinates: 66°18′40″N 14°08′16″E
- Appeals to: Hålogaland Court of Appeal
- Website: Official website

Helgeland District Court (Norwegian: Helgeland tingrett) is a district court located in Nordland county, Norway. This court is based at three different courthouses which are located in Brønnøysund, Mo i Rana, and Sandnessjøen. The court is subordinate to the Hålogaland Court of Appeal. The court serves the southern part of the county which includes cases from 17 municipalities.

- The courthouse in Brønnøysund accepts cases from the municipalities of Bindal, Brønnøy, Sømna, Vega, and Vevelstad.
- The courthouse in Mo i Rana accepts cases from the municipalities of Hemnes, Lurøy, Nesna, Rana, Rødøy, and Træna.
- The courthouse in Sandnessjøen accepts cases from the municipalities of Alstahaug, Dønna, Grane, Hattfjelldal, Herøy, Leirfjord, and Vefsn.

The court is led by a chief judge (sorenskriver) and several other judges. The court is a court of first instance. Its judicial duties are mainly to settle criminal cases and to resolve civil litigation as well as bankruptcy. The administration and registration tasks of the court include death registration, issuing certain certificates, performing duties of a notary public, and officiating civil wedding ceremonies. Cases from this court are heard by a combination of professional judges and lay judges.

== History ==
The Helgeland District Court was first established in 1591. By a royal resolution of 5 May 1859, the Helgeland District Court was divided into Søndre Helgeland District Court and Nordre Helgeland District Court. Later, another royal resolution of 11 July 1919, the Søndre Helgeland District Court was divided into Brønnøy District Court and Alstahaug District Court. On 20 December 2020, the Storting voted to merge the three courts back together. So, this court was re-established on 26 April 2021 after the old Alstahaug District Court, Brønnøy District Court and Rana District Court were all merged into one court. The new district court system continues to use the courthouses from the predecessor courts.
