= Follo District Court =

Former district court in Norway

- Follo tingrett
- Interactive map of Follo District Court
- 59°42′53″N 10°49′55″E
- Established: 1 January 2006
- Dissolved: 26 April 2021
- Jurisdiction: Follo
- Location: Akershus, Norway
- Coordinates: 59°42′53″N 10°49′55″E
- Appeals to: Borgarting Court of Appeal

Follo District Court (Norwegian: Follo tingrett) was a district court in Akershus county, Norway. The court was based in the town of Ski in Nordre Follo Municipality. The court had jurisdiction over the district of Follo and it existed until 2021. It had jurisdiction over the municipalities of Enebakk, Frogn, Nesodden, Nordre Follo Municipality, Vestby, and Ås. Cases from this court could be appealed to Borgarting Court of Appeal.

The court was a court of first instance. Its judicial duties were mainly to settle criminal cases and to resolve civil litigation as well as bankruptcy. The administration and registration tasks of the court included death registration, issuing certain certificates, performing duties of a notary public, and officiating civil wedding ceremonies. Cases from this court were heard by a combination of professional judges and lay judges.

== History ==
The court was created on 1 January 2006, when the old Indre Follo District Court and Ytre Follo District Court were merged. On 26 April 2021, Follo District Court was merged with the Heggen og Frøland District Court were merged into the new Follo og Nordre Østfold District Court. The new district court system continued to use the courthouses from the predecessor courts.
