= Brønnøy District Court =

District court in Brønnøy, Norway

- Brønnøy tingrett
- 65.46777°N 12.20578°E
- Established: 11 July 1919
- Dissolved: 26 April 2021
- Jurisdiction: Southern Helgeland, Norway
- Location: Brønnøysund
- Coordinates: 65.46777°N 12.20578°E
- Appeals to: Hålogaland Court of Appeal

Division map
- Brønnøy District Court covered the yellow areas in Nordland county

Brønnøy District Court (Norwegian: Brønnøy tingrett) was a district court in Nordland county, Norway. The court was based in the town of Brønnøysund. The court existed from 1919 until 2021. It served Bindal Municipality, Brønnøy Municipality, Sømna Municipality, Vega Municipality, and Vevelstad Municipality. Cases from this court could be appealed to Hålogaland Court of Appeal. The court was led by the chief judge (Sorenskriver) Rolf Selfors, who also lead the neighboring Alstahaug District Court and Rana District Court at the time of the court's dissolution. This court employed a chief judge, one other judge, and four prosecutors.

The court was a court of first instance. Its judicial duties were mainly to settle criminal cases and to resolve civil litigation as well as bankruptcy. The administration and registration tasks of the court included death registration, issuing certain certificates, performing duties of a notary public, and officiating civil wedding ceremonies. Cases from this court were heard by a combination of professional judges and lay judges.

== History ==
The court was established on 11 July 1919 when the old Søndre Helgeland District Court was divided and the southern part of that geographical jurisdiction was separated to become the new Brønnøy District Court (the rest of the area remained part of the Søndre Helgeland District Court which was later renamed as Alstahaug District Court). On 26 April 2021, the court was merged with the Alstahaug District Court and Rana District Court to create the new Helgeland District Court.
