= Søndre Østfold District Court =

First-instance law court in Norway

- Søndre Østfold tingrett
- 59°26′09″N 10°40′13″E
- Established: 12 April 2021
- Jurisdiction: South Østfold, Norway
- Location: Fredrikstad, Halden, Moss, and Sarpsborg
- Coordinates: 59°26′09″N 10°40′13″E
- Appeals to: Borgarting Court of Appeal
- Website: Official website

Søndre Østfold District Court (Norwegian: Søndre Østfold tingrett) is a district court located in southern Østfold, Norway. This court is based at four different courthouses which are located in Fredrikstad, Halden, Moss, and Sarpsborg. The court is subordinate to the Borgarting Court of Appeal. The court serves the southern part of Østfold which includes nine municipalities.

- The courthouse in Fredrikstad accepts cases from the municipalities of Hvaler and Fredrikstad.
- The court in Halden accepts cases from the municipalities of Aremark and Halden.
- The court in Moss accepts cases from the municipalities of Moss, Råde, and Våler.
- The court in Sarpsborg accepts cases from the municipalities of Rakkestad and Sarpsborg.

The court is led by a chief judge (sorenskriver) and several other judges. The court is a court of first instance. Its judicial duties are mainly to settle criminal cases and to resolve civil litigation as well as bankruptcy. The administration and registration tasks of the court include death registration, issuing certain certificates, performing duties of a notary public, and officiating civil wedding ceremonies. Cases from this court are heard by a combination of professional judges and lay judges.

== History ==
This court was established on 12 April 2021 after the old Fredrikstad District Court, Halden District Court, Moss District Court, and Sarpsborg District Court were all merged into one court. The new district court system continues to use the courthouses from the predecessor courts. When the court was created, the Storting also approved moving these areas from the Borgarting Court of Appeal to the Eidsivating Court of Appeal. This change was not carried out immediately in April of 2021, however, and the law stated that the change would take place when the government is ready to make the switch. By 2025, the switch had not yet been carried out.
