= Midtre Hålogaland District Court =

First-instance law court in Norway

- Midtre Hålogaland tingrett
- 68°26′16″N 17°25′32″E
- Established: 26 April 2021
- Jurisdiction: Central Hålogaland, Norway
- Location: Harstad, Narvik, and Sortland
- Coordinates: 68°26′16″N 17°25′32″E
- Appeals to: Hålogaland Court of Appeal
- Website: Official website

Midtre Hålogaland District Court (Norwegian: Midtre Hålogaland tingrett) is a district court located in Troms and Nordland, Norway. This court is based at three different courthouses which are located in Harstad, Narvik, and Sortland. The court is subordinate to the Hålogaland Court of Appeal. The court serves Ofoten, Vesterålen, and the southern part of Troms in central Hålogaland which includes cases from 15 municipalities.

- The courthouse in Harstad accepts cases from the municipalities of Harstad, Ibestad, Kvæfjord, and Tjeldsund.
- The courthouse in Narvik accepts cases from the municipalities of Evenes, Gratangen, Lavangen, Lødingen, Narvik, and Salangen.
- The courthouse in Sortland accepts cases from the municipalities of Andøy, Bø, Hadsel, Sortland, and Øksnes.

The court is led by a chief judge (sorenskriver) and several other judges. The court is a court of first instance. Its judicial duties are mainly to settle criminal cases and to resolve civil litigation as well as bankruptcy. The administration and registration tasks of the court include death registration, issuing certain certificates, performing duties of a notary public, and officiating civil wedding ceremonies. Cases from this court are heard by a combination of professional judges and lay judges.

== History ==
This court was established on 26 April 2021 after the old Ofoten District Court, Trondenes District Court and Vesterålen District Court were all merged into one court. The new district court system continues to use the courthouses from the predecessor courts.
