= Heggen and Frøland District Court =

Former district court in Norway

Heggen og Frøland District Court
- Heggen og Frøland tingrett
- 59°33′15″N 11°19′36″E
- Established: 13 June 1952
- Dissolved: 26 April 2021
- Jurisdiction: Northern Østfold
- Location: Mysen, Norway
- Coordinates: 59°33′15″N 11°19′36″E
- Appeals to: Borgarting Court of Appeal

Heggen and Frøland District Court (Norwegian: Heggen og Frøland tingrett) was a district court in Akershus county, Norway. The court was based in Mysen in Indre Østfold Municipality. The court existed until 2021. It had jurisdiction overIndre Østfold Municipality, Marker Municipality, and Skiptvet Municipality (before 2020, Rømskog Municipality was also part of this district court). Cases from this court could be appealed to Borgarting Court of Appeal.

The court was a court of first instance. Its judicial duties were mainly to settle criminal cases and to resolve civil litigation as well as bankruptcy. The administration and registration tasks of the court included death registration, issuing certain certificates, performing duties of a notary public, and officiating civil wedding ceremonies. Cases from this court were heard by a combination of professional judges and lay judges.

== History ==
This court was established on 13 June 1952. Originally, it had jurisdiction over the municipalities of Trøgstad, Askim, Eidsberg, Mysen, Spydeberg, Rømskog, and Rødenes. On 26 April 2021, Heggen og Frøland District Court was dissolved and merged with Follo District Court to create the new Follo og Nordre Østfold District Court
