= Buskerud District Court =

First-instance law court in Norway

- Buskerud tingrett
- 59°44′39″N 10°12′42″E
- Established: 26 April 2021
- Jurisdiction: Southern Buskerud, Norway
- Location: Drammen, Hokksund, and Kongsberg
- Coordinates: 59°44′39″N 10°12′42″E
- Appeals to: Borgarting Court of Appeal
- Website: Official website

Buskerud District Court (Norwegian: Buskerud tingrett) is a district court located in Buskerud county, Norway. This court is based at three different courthouses which are located in Drammen, Hokksund, and Kongsberg. The court is subordinate to the Borgarting Court of Appeal. The court serves the southern part of Buskerud which includes jurisdiction over cases from 10 municipalities.

- The courthouse in Drammen accepts cases from the municipalities of Drammen and Lier.
- The courthouse in Hokksund accepts cases from the municipalities of Øvre Eiker, Modum, Sigdal, and Krødsherad.
- The courthouse in Kongsberg accepts cases from the municipalities of Flesberg, Kongsberg, Nore og Uvdal, and Rollag.

The court is led by a chief judge (sorenskriver) and several other judges. The court is a court of first instance. Its judicial duties are mainly to settle criminal cases and to resolve civil litigation as well as bankruptcy. The administration and registration tasks of the court include death registration, issuing certain certificates, performing duties of a notary public, and officiating civil wedding ceremonies. Cases from this court are heard by a combination of professional judges and lay judges.

== History ==
This court was established on 26 April 2021 after the old Drammen District Court, Hallingdal District Court, and Kongsberg og Eiker District Court were all merged into one court. The new district court system continued to use the courthouses from the predecessor courts.

Originally (from 2021-2025), this court had a fourth courthouse site in Nesbyen, which accepted cases from the municipalities of Flå, Gol, Hemsedal, Hol, Nesbyen, and Ål. On 10 June 2025, this courthouse and these municipalities were transferred to the newly-created Ringerike og Hallingdal District Court.
