= Ringerike and Hallingdal District Court =

First-instance law court in Norway

- Ringerike og Hallingdal tingrett
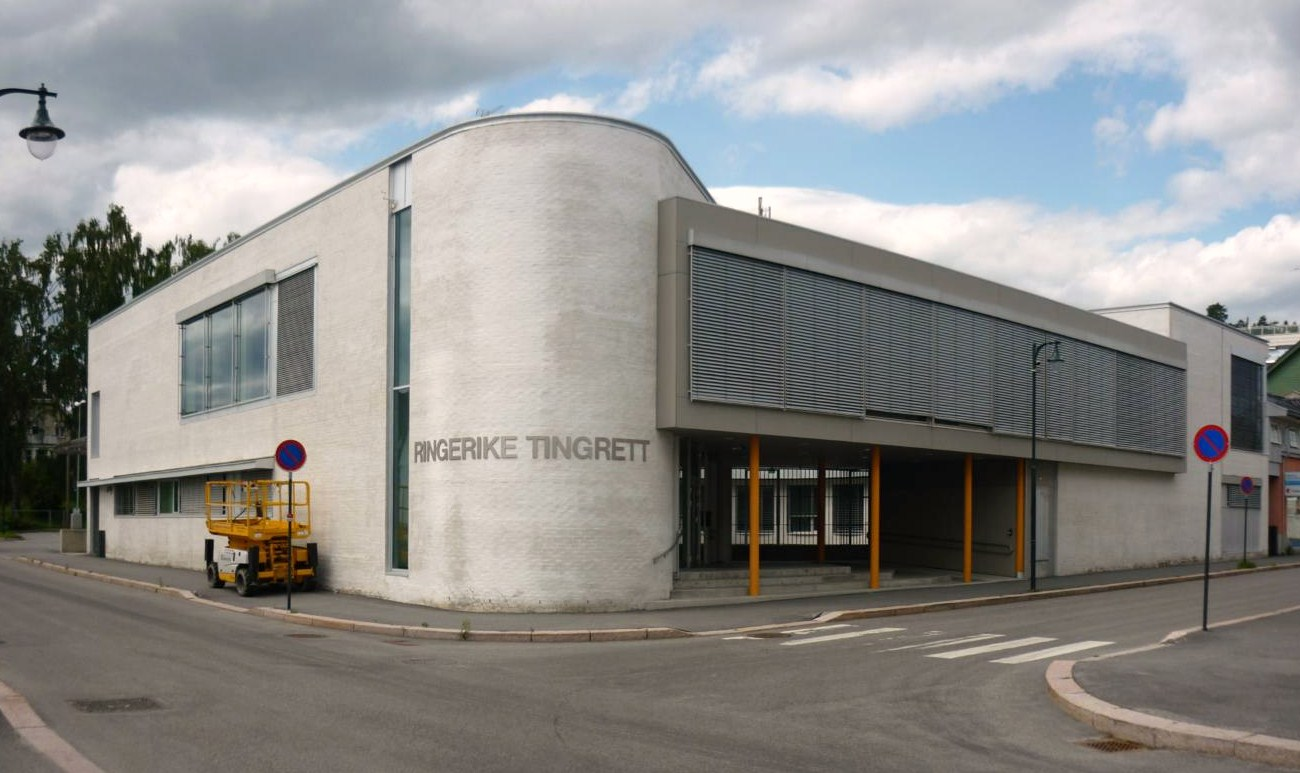
- Courthouse in Hønefoss
- Interactive map of Ringerike and Hallingdal; District Court
- 60°09′49″N 10°15′19″E
- Established: 10 June 2025
- Jurisdiction: Ringerike and Hallingdal
- Location: Hønefoss and Nesbyen, Norway
- Coordinates: 60°09′49″N 10°15′19″E
- Appeals to: Borgarting Court of Appeal
- Website: Official website

Ringerike and Hallingdal District Court (Norwegian: Ringerike og Hallingdal tingrett) is a district court with jurisdiction in parts of Buskerud and Akershus counties in Norway. This court is based at two different courthouses which are located in Hønefoss and Nesbyen. The court is subordinate to the Borgarting Court of Appeal. The court serves the northeastern parts of Buskerud county and the northwestern part of Akershus county. It has jurisdiction over 10 municipalities.

- The courthouse in Hønefoss accepts cases from the municipalities of Hole and Ringerike in Buskerud county and Jevnaker and Lunner in Akershus county.
- The courthouse in Nesbyen accepts cases from the municipalities of Flå, Gol, Hemsedal, Hol, Nesbyen, and Ål (all in Buskerud county).

The court is led by a chief judge (sorenskriver) and several other judges. The court is a court of first instance. Its judicial duties are mainly to settle criminal cases and to resolve civil litigation as well as bankruptcy. The administration and registration tasks of the court include death registration, issuing certain certificates, performing duties of a notary public, and officiating civil wedding ceremonies. Cases from this court are heard by a combination of professional judges and lay judges.

== History ==
This court was established on 10 June 2025 after the a reorganization of the district courts in the region. The old Ringerike, Asker og Bærum District Court and Buskerud District Court were both divided and the "Ringerike" region from the Ringerike, Asker og Bærum District Court was combined with the "Hallingdal" region from the Buskerud District Court to form the new "Ringerike og Hallingdal District Court". At the same time, the old Ringerike, Asker og Bærum District Court was renamed Asker og Bærum District Court.
