= Sør-Østerdal District Court =

District court in Elverum, Norway

- Sør-Østerdal tingrett
- 60°52′48″N 11°33′45″E
- Established: 1 July 1837
- Dissolved: 26 April 2021
- Jurisdiction: Sør-Østerdalen
- Location: Elverum, Norway
- Coordinates: 60°52′48″N 11°33′45″E
- Appeals to: Eidsivating; Court of Appeal

Division map
- Hedmark county and its court districts; Sør-Østerdal is in yellow.

Sør-Østerdal District Court (Norwegian: Sør-Østerdal tingrett) was a district court in Innlandet county, Norway. The court was located in Elverum. It included the southern part of Østerdalen, including the municipalities of Elverum, Trysil, Våler, Åmot, and Åsnes. Cases from this court could be appealed to Eidsivating Court of Appeal.

The court was led by a chief judge (sorenskriver) and several other judges. The court was a court of first instance. Its judicial duties were mainly to settle criminal cases and to resolve civil litigation as well as bankruptcy. The administration and registration tasks of the court included death registration, issuing certain certificates, performing duties of a notary public, and officiating civil wedding ceremonies. Cases from this court were heard by a combination of professional judges and lay judges.

== History ==
On 1 July 1837, the old Østerdalen District Court was divided into two: Nord-Østerdal District Court in the north and Sør-Østerdal District Court in the south. On 26 April 2021, the court was merged with the Nord-Østerdal District Court and the Hedmarken District Court to create the new Østre Innlandet District Court.
