= Hedmarken District Court =

Former district court in Norway

- Hedmarken tingrett
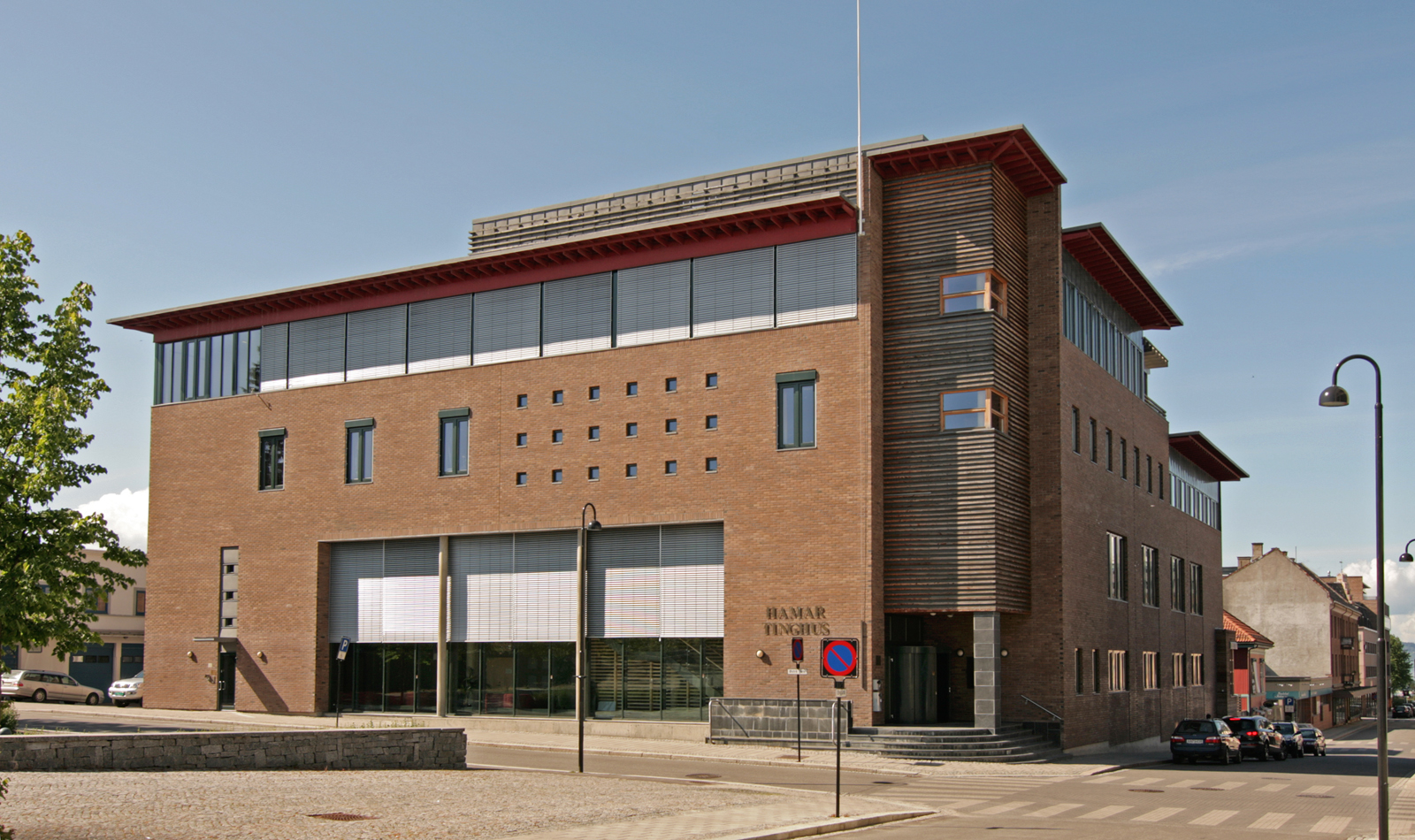
- The Courthouse of Hamar
- Interactive map of Hedmarken District Court
- 60°47′36″N 11°04′39″E
- Established: 1 January 1992
- Dissolved: 26 April 2021
- Jurisdiction: Hedemarken
- Location: Hamar, Norway
- Coordinates: 60°47′36″N 11°04′39″E
- Appeals to: Eidsivating; Court of Appeal

Division map
- Hedmark county and its court districts; Hedmarken was in purple.

Hedmarken District Court (Norwegian: Hedmarken tingrett) was a district court in Innlandet county, Norway. The court existed from 1588 to 1777 and again from 1992 until 2021. It served the Hedmarken area which included the municipalities of Hamar, Løten, Ringsaker, and Stange. The court was based in Hamar. The court had one chief judge, four other judges and two deputy judges, as well as an administrative staff of 12. Cases from this court could be appealed to the Eidsivating Court of Appeal in Hamar.

The court was a court of first instance. Its judicial duties were mainly to settle criminal cases and to resolve civil litigation as well as bankruptcy. The administration and registration tasks of the court included death registration, issuing certain certificates, performing duties of a notary public, and officiating civil wedding ceremonies. Cases from this court were heard by a combination of professional judges and lay judges.

== History ==
Hedmarken District Court was established by royal resolution from King Christian IV on 31 July 1591. The court was based in Hamar. It was in operation until 8 January 1777, when the court was divided into Nord-Hedmark District Court and Sør-Hedmark District Court. On 1 January 1992, the Nord-Hedmark and Sør-Hedmark courts were merged back together to create the Hedmarken District Court. On 26 April 2021, the court was merged with the Nord-Østerdal District Court and the Sør-Østerdal District Court to create the new Østre Innlandet District Court.
