= Asker og Bærum District Court =

First-instance law court in Norway

- Asker og Bærum tingrett
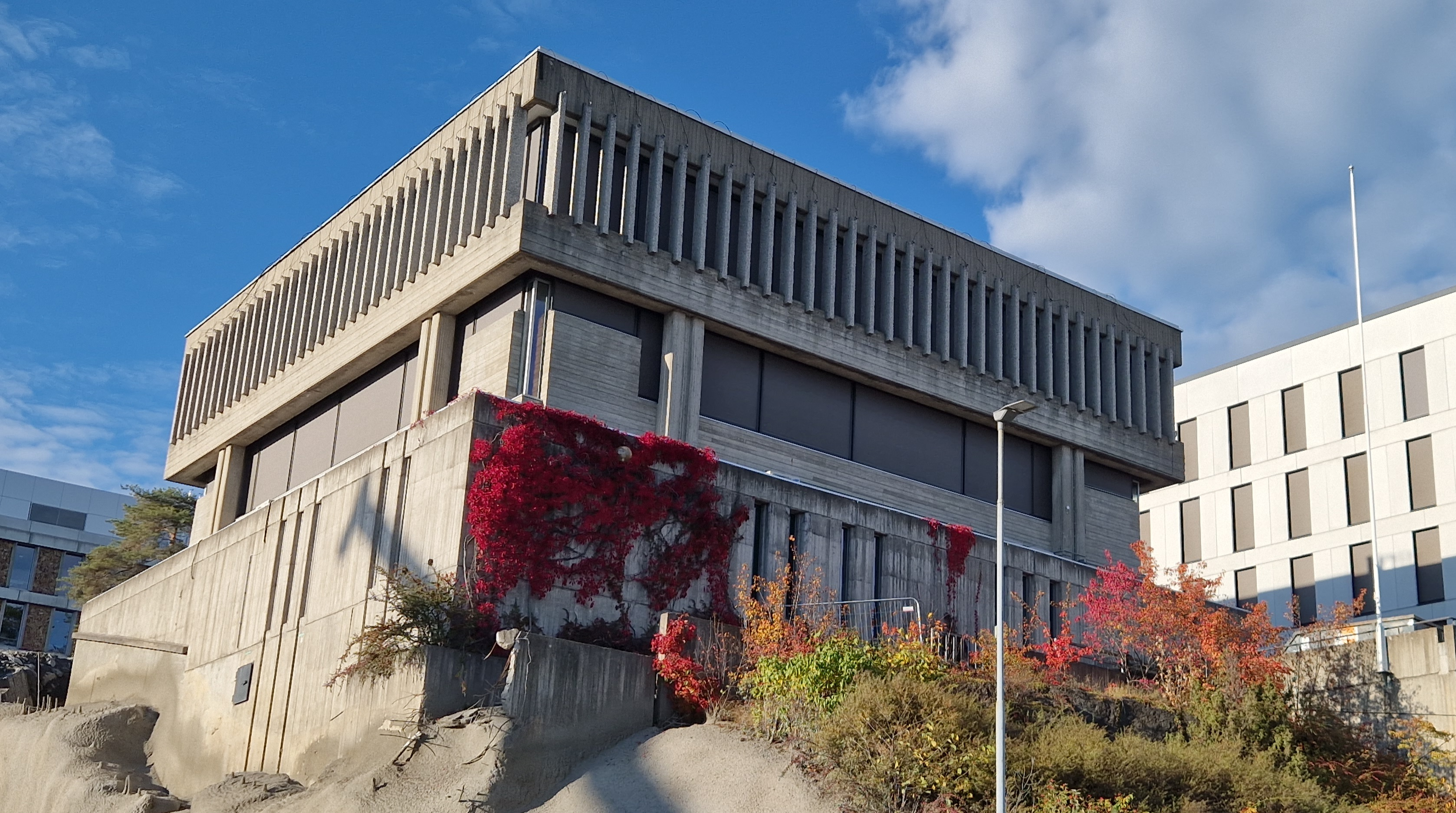
- The courthouse in Sandvika in 2022
- 59°53′30″N 10°31′37″E
- Established: 1948
- Jurisdiction: Asker and Bærum, Norway
- Location: Sandvika, Norway
- Coordinates: 59°53′30″N 10°31′37″E
- Appeals to: Borgarting Court of Appeal
- Website: Official website

Asker og Bærum District Court (Norwegian: Asker og Bærum tingrett) is a district court located in Akershus counties, Norway. This court is based in Sandvika in Bærum Municipality. This court has jurisdiction over Asker Municipality and Bærum Municipality, two large municipalities just southwest of Oslo, the national capital. The court is subordinate to the Borgarting Court of Appeal.

The court is led by a chief judge (sorenskriver) and several other judges. The court is a court of first instance. Its judicial duties are mainly to settle criminal cases and to resolve civil litigation as well as bankruptcy. The administration and registration tasks of the court include death registration, issuing certain certificates, performing duties of a notary public, and officiating civil wedding ceremonies. Cases from this court are heard by a combination of professional judges and lay judges.

== History ==
=== Establishment of the court ===
The court was first established in 1948 when it was created by dividing area of jurisdiction for the large Aker District Court. It originally was created to have jurisdiction over Asker Municipality and Bærum Municipality. In 2006, the court employed 13 professional judges, of which one was the presiding judge, and 2 deputy judges. The administration had 20 employees. That year, the court handled 280 criminal cases, 70 civil cases plus summary procedures.

=== Ringerike, Asker og Bærum District Court ===
On 26 April 2021 after the old Ringerike District Court was merged into the Asker og Bærum District Court and the name of the court was changed to Ringerike, Asker og Bærum District Court. This merger added an additional courthouse in Hønefoss for the court to use. The courthouse in Sandvika continued to take cases from Asker and Bærum municipalities and the courthouse in Hønefoss accepted cases from the municipalities of Hole, Ringerike, Jevnaker, and Lunner.

=== Asker og Bærum District Court ===
On 10 June 2025, the court was divided (undoing the changes from 2021). The courthouse in Hønefoss (and the municipalities over which it had jurisdiction) was transferred to the newly-created Ringerike og Hallingdal District Court. After the division, the name was changed back to Asker og Bærum District Court, and the courthouse in Sandvika continued to take cases from the municipalities of Asker and Bærum once again.
