= Nord-Troms District Court =

District court in Troms, Norway

- Nord-Troms tingrett
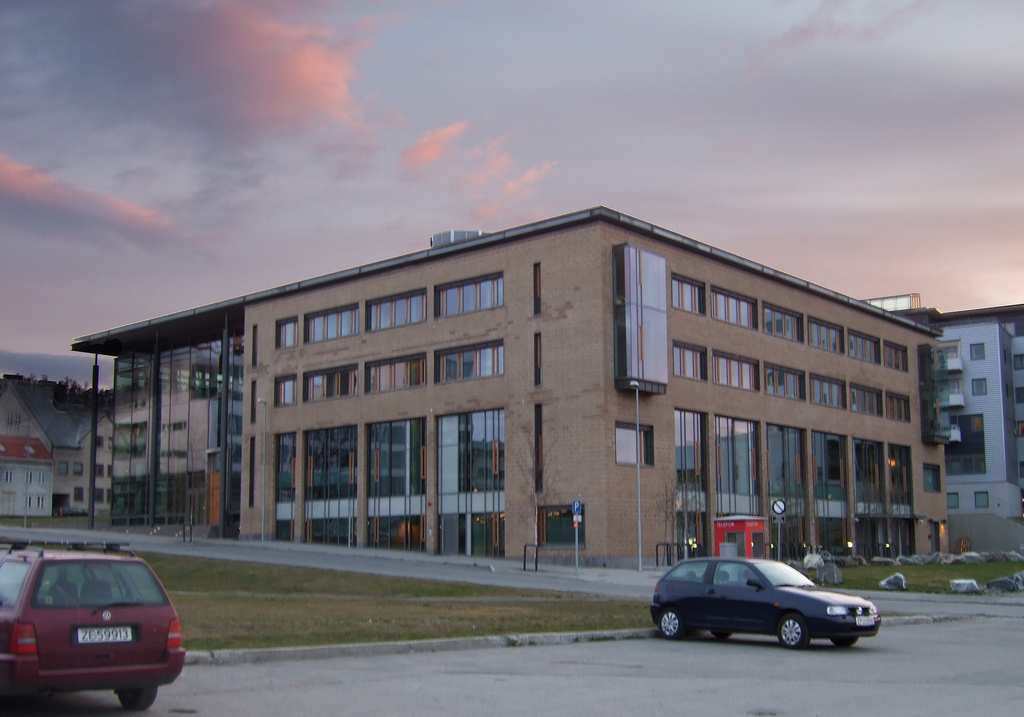
- View of the courthouse
- 69.6548°N 18.9651°E
- Established: 1990
- Dissolved: 26 April 2021
- Jurisdiction: Northern Troms and Svalbard
- Location: Tromsø, Norway
- Coordinates: 69.6548°N 18.9651°E
- Appeals to: Hålogaland Court of Appeal

Division map
- Nord-Troms District Court covered the red areas in Troms county

Nord-Troms District Court (Norwegian: Nord-Troms tingrett) was a district court located in the city of Tromsø in Troms county, Norway. The court served the part of the county located north of the Malangen fjord, plus the territory of Svalbard. This included the municipalities of Tromsø, Karlsøy, Balsfjord, Storfjord, Gáivuotna–Kåfjord, Nordreisa, Skjervøy and Kvænangen (and Svalbard). The court was subordinate to the Hålogaland Court of Appeal. The court was led by the chief judge (Sorenskriver) Unni Sandbukt. This court employed a chief judge and nine other judges.

The court was a court of first instance. Its judicial duties were mainly to settle criminal cases and to resolve civil litigation as well as bankruptcy. The administration and registration tasks of the court included death registration, issuing certain certificates, performing duties of a notary public, and officiating civil wedding ceremonies. Cases from this court were heard by a combination of professional judges and lay judges.

== History ==
Starting around 1600, Troms county was divided into two district courts: Senja District Court and Tromsø District Court. In 1755 the two courts were merged into one court: Senja og Tromsø District Court. When Tromsø became a kjøpstad in 1794, it was supposed to have its own court, although that didn't actually happen until 1838. In 1855, the district court was divided back to the historical Senja District Court and Tromsø District Court. In 1917, the Tromsø District Court was divided into two: Malangen District Court and Lyngen District Court. In 1985, a new Tromsø District Court was established by the merger of the Tromsø City Court and the Malangen District Court. In 1990, the Nord-Troms District Court was created when the Tromsø District Court was merged with the Lyngen District Court. Originally, it was called the Nord-Troms herredsrett, but in 2002, all courts of first instance in Norway changed their name tingrett, thus its new name was Nord-Troms tingrett. On 26 April 2021, Nord-Troms District Court was merged with the Senja District Court to create the new Nord-Troms og Senja District Court.
