= Norwegian National Courts Administration =

The Norwegian Courts Administration (Norwegian: Domstoladministrasjonen) is a Norwegian government agency responsible for the management and operations of the Courts of Justice of Norway. It is purely an administrative organisation, and does not interfere with the judicial processes nor the appointment of judges or other judicial positions in the court system. The agency is based in Trondheim and was created on November 1, 2002, when the responsibilities were transferred from the Norwegian Ministry of Justice and the Police.

Judges are nominated by the Judicial Appointments Board, and officially appointed by the Norwegian Council of State.

== 2011 ==
In 2011, the agency recommended the removal from office of district court judge Tor Holger Bertelsen. (No district court judge has been removed from office in Norway, after World War Two.)
