= Borgarting Court of Appeal =

Appellate court in Norway

- Borgarting tingrett
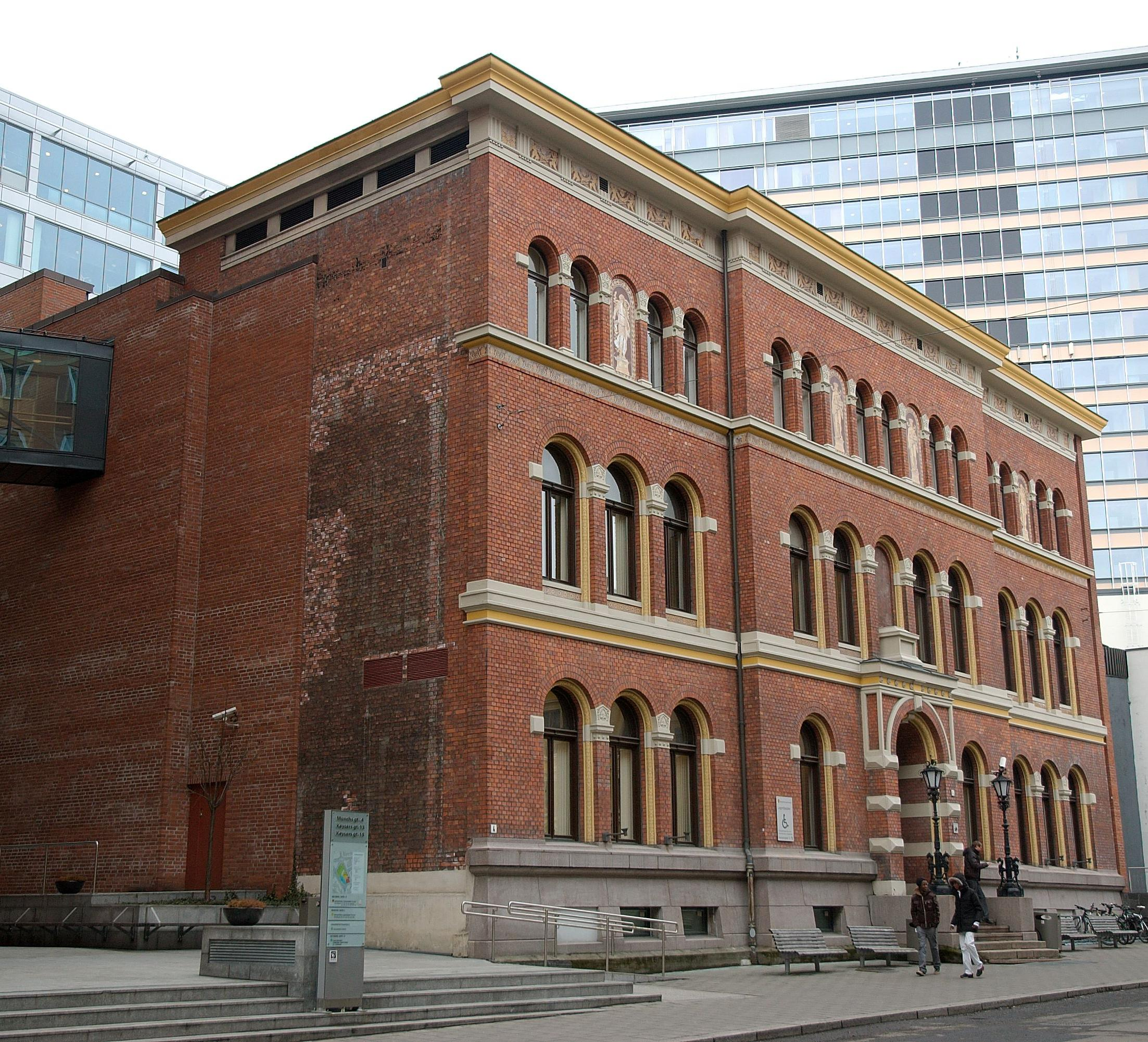
- View of the courthouse
- Interactive map of Borgarting Court of Appeal
- 59°55′00″N 10°44′29″E
- Established: 1 Jan 1995
- Jurisdiction: Western Viken and Oslo
- Location: Keysers gate 13, Oslo, Norway
- Coordinates: 59°55′00″N 10°44′29″E
- Composition method: Court of Appeal
- Appeals to: Supreme Court of Norway
- Appeals from: District courts
- Number of positions: 107
- Website: Official website

Chief Judge (Førstelagmann)
- Currently: Marianne Vollan

The Borgarting Court of Appeal (Norwegian: Borgarting lagmannsrett) is one of six intermediate courts of appeal in Norway. The Court is located in the city of Oslo. The court has jurisdiction over the counties of Oslo, Buskerud, and parts of Akershus and Østfold. These areas constitute the Borgarting judicial district (Norwegian: Borgarting lagdømme). This court can rule on both civil and criminal cases that are appealed from one of its subordinate district courts. Court decisions can be, to a limited extent, appealed to the Supreme Court of Norway. The court has 62 judges and 45 administrative staff. The chief judicial officer of the court (Norwegian: førstelagmann) is currently Marianne Vollan. The court is administered by the Norwegian National Courts Administration.

== Location ==
The Court has its seat in the city of Oslo. Additionally, the Court permanently sits in the town of Drammen. The Court may also sit in other places within its jurisdiction as needed.

The main courthouse in Oslo was built in 2005. It is an eleven story building with four stories of court rooms and seven stories with meeting rooms and offices. There are additional court rooms in a historic adjoining building that was constructed in the early 20th century. The building is located near St. Olavs Plass in the city center.

== Jurisdiction ==
This court accepts appeals from all of the district courts from its geographic jurisdiction. This court is divided into judicial regions (Norwegian: lagsogn) and there is one or more district courts (Norwegian: tingrett) that belongs to each of these regions.

Judicial Regions (lagsogner)	District courts (tingretter)
Oslo, Asker, og Bærum	Oslo District Court; Asker og Bærum District Court
Buskerud	Buskerud District Court; Ringerike og Hallingdal District Court
Søndre Østfold	Søndre Østfold District Court

== History ==
The Borgarting is first mentioned in sources in 1047 as a thing for the counties around the Oslofjord, eventually expanding as far as into Grenland and Båhuslen. The thing was held at Borg. Its laws were codified by King Magnus VI in 1276, when ten judges were appointed. By the fourteenth century, Oslo, Grenland and Båhuslen had their own courts, each with their own presiding judge, and Borgarting was left with Vestfold and Østfold, with the judge seat moving to Tønsberg. In the fifteenth century the seat was moved across the fjord to Sarpsborg, and in 1567 to Fredrikstad. From 1797 Borgarting was renamed Fredrikshald after the city of the same name, and Oslo was renamed Kristiania.

In 1797, the four stiftsoverrett were created as courts of appeal. Akershus Court of Appeal was located in Oslo (at the time called Christiania) and responsible for Eastern Norway. The current structure with six courts of appeal and their names dates from 1890 when the Borgarting Court of Appeal was established. In 1892, the areas of Agder, Telemark, and Vestfold were added to the jurisdiction of this court, and at that time it was renamed the Borgarting og Agder Court of Appeal. In 1936, the court system was modified again and on 1 July 1936, the Borgarting og Agder Court of Appeal was dissolved and its areas split between the Eidsivating Court of Appeal and the Agder Court of Appeal. At the same time the title overrett ("high court") disappeared. On 1 January 1995, the Eidsivating Court of Appeal was divided. The southwestern part of the old court's jurisdictional area became the new Borgarting Court of Appeal and the northeastern part retained the old Eidsivating Court of Appeal name. On 26 April 2021, the Storting approved moving the areas of eastern Viken county from the Borgarting court to the Eidsivating court.
