= Hålogaland Court of Appeal =

Appeals court in Northern Norway

- Hålogaland lagmannsrett
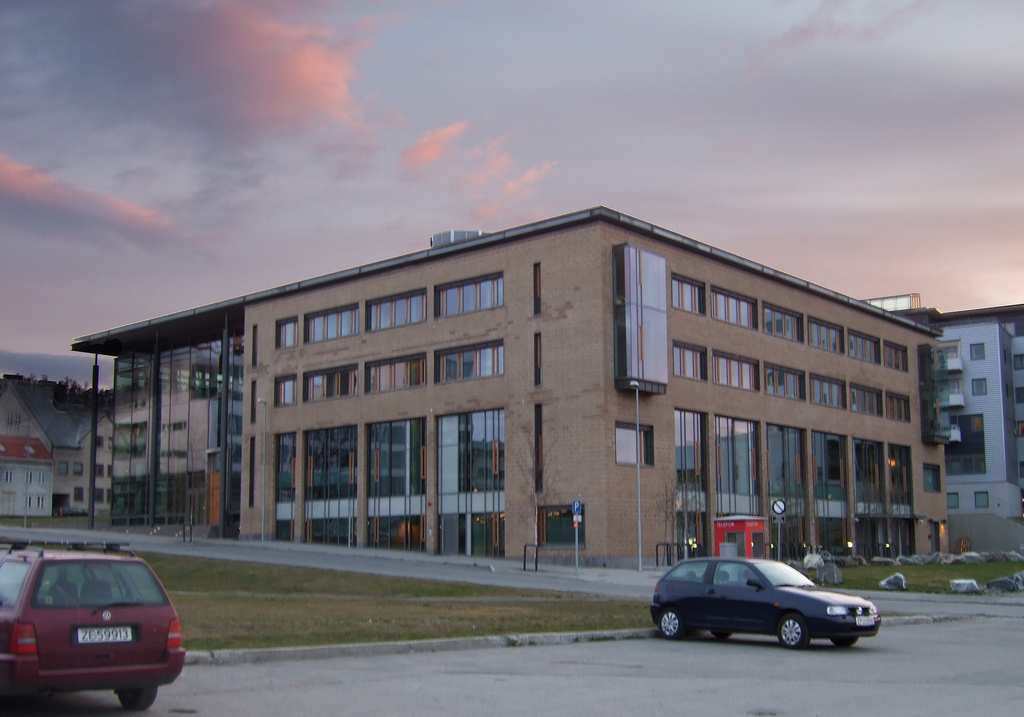
- Courthouse in Tromsø
- Interactive map of Hålogaland Court of Appeal
- 69°39′17″N 18°57′56″E
- Established: 1 Jan 1890
- Jurisdiction: Nordland, Jan Mayen, Troms, Svalbard, Finnmark
- Location: Tromsø, Norway
- Coordinates: 69°39′17″N 18°57′56″E
- Composition method: Court of Appeal
- Appeals to: Supreme Court of Norway
- Appeals from: District courts
- Number of positions: 16 judges
- Website: Official website

Chief Judge (Førstelagmann)
- Currently: Monica Hansen Nylund
- Since: 2017

Division map

The Hålogaland Court of Appeal (Norwegian: Hålogaland lagmannsrett) is one of six courts of appeal in the Kingdom of Norway. The Court is located in the city of Tromsø. The court has jurisdiction over the counties of Nordland, Troms, and Finnmark as well as the island territories of Jan Mayen and Svalbard. These areas constitute the judicial district of Hålogaland (Norwegian: Hålogaland lagdømme), which has nearly a half a million residents. This court can rule on both civil and criminal cases that are appealed from one of its subordinate district courts. Court decisions can be, to a limited extent, appealed to the Supreme Court of Norway. The court has 16 full-time judges plus a number of other support staff members (as of 2015). The chief judicial officer of the court (Norwegian: førstelagmann) is currently Monica Hansen Nylund. The court is administered by the Norwegian National Courts Administration.

Because of the great distances both at land and at sea in Northern Norway, the Court deals with many cases related to fishery and land rights. Northern Norway is also where the "three peoples" meet (Norwegians, Samis, and Kvens). The cultural variations demand bigger efforts of the Court's judges, among other the ability to understand different ways of living and thinking. Also lingual variations represent a challenge.

== Location ==
The Court has its seat in Tromsø, the capital of Troms county and the largest city in Northern Norway (Hålogaland). Additionally, the Court permanently sits in the towns of Bodø (the capital of Nordland county and the second largest city in Northern Norway) and Mosjøen (also in Nordland county). The Court may also sit in other places within its jurisdiction as needed.

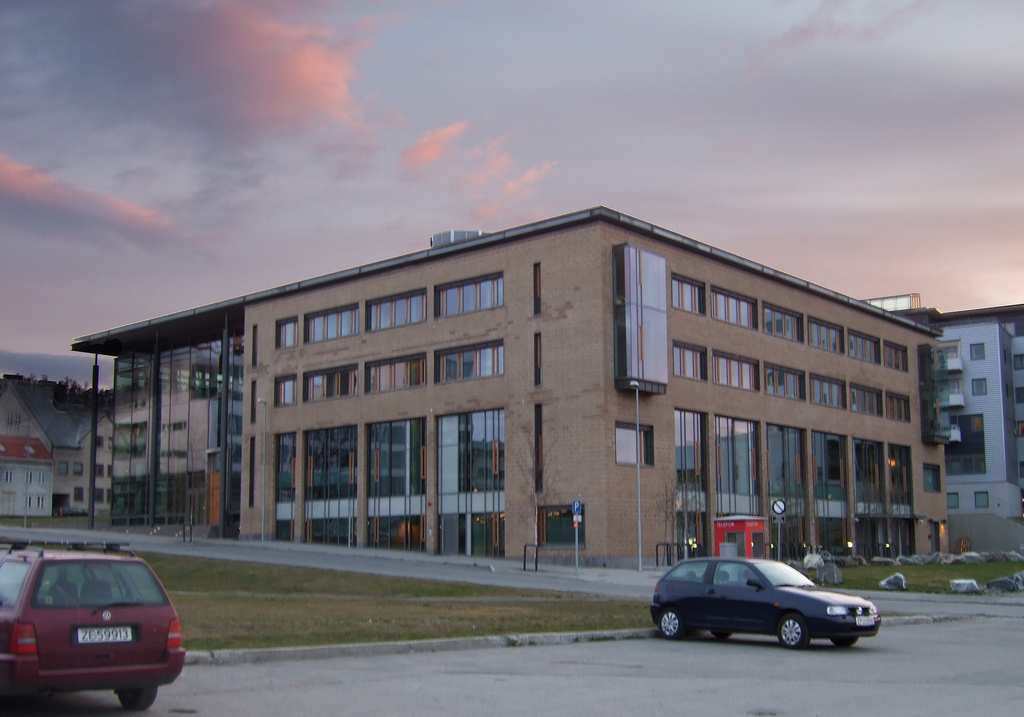
The Courthouse in Tromsø

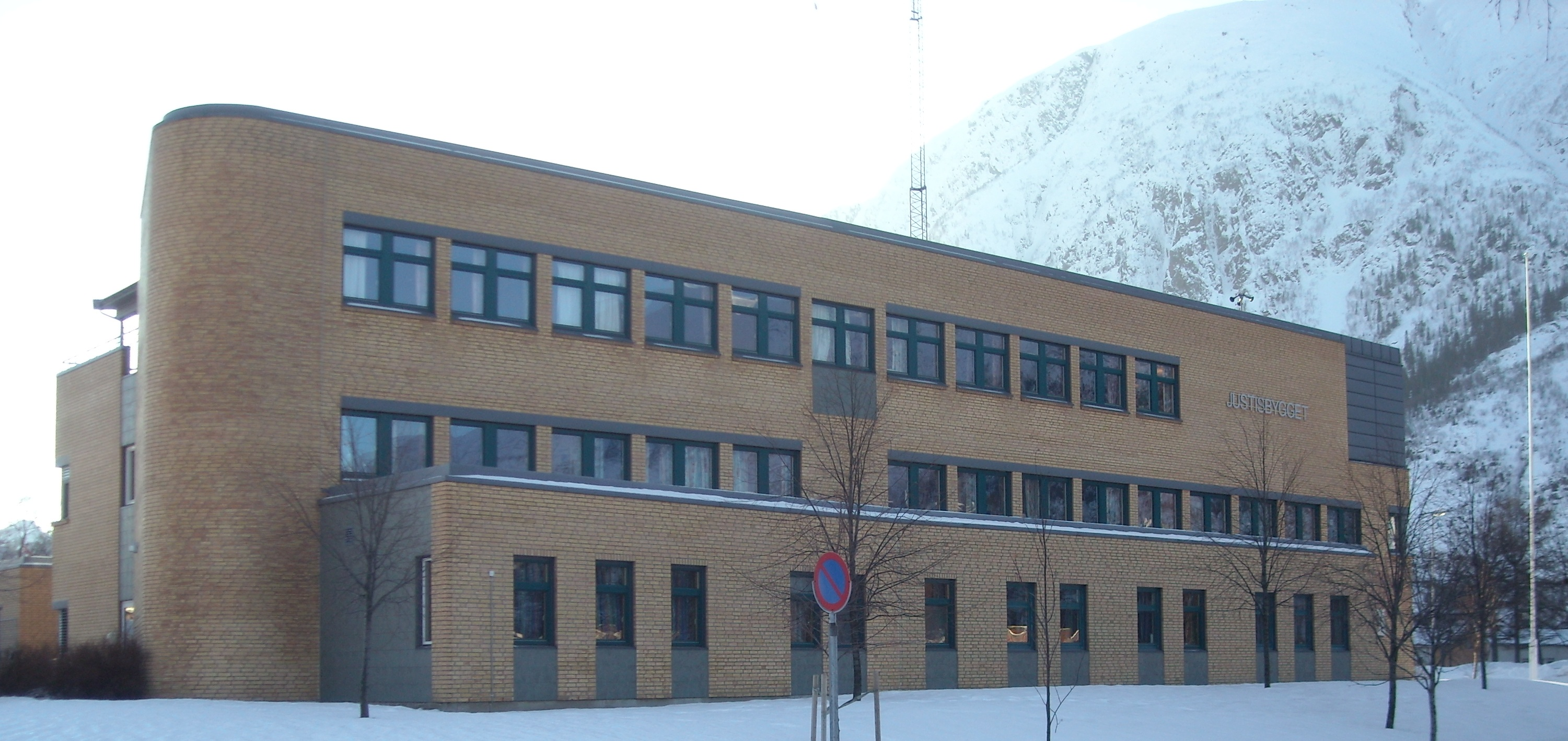
The Building of Justice in Mosjøen

== Jurisdiction ==
This court accepts appeals from all of the district courts from its geographic jurisdiction. This court is divided into judicial regions (Norwegian: lagsogn) and there is one or more district courts (Norwegian: tingrett) that belongs to each of these regions.

Judicial Regions (lagsogner)	District courts (tingretter)
Nordland	Helgeland District Court; Midtre Hålogaland District Court; Salten og Lofoten District Court
Romsa/Troms	Nord-Troms og Senja District Court
Finnmárku/Finnmark	Vestre Finnmark District Court; Indre og Østre Finnmark District Court

== History ==
During the Middle Ages, the old Thing of Hålogaland met at Steigen in Nordland county. This assembly was dissolved in 1797 and after that time, Hålogaland was part of the diocesan court in Trondheim. On 1 January 1890, the Hålogaland District Court was established with its main court in the city of Tromsø.
