= District court (Norway) =

Court of first instance in Norway

In Norway, the district court (Norwegian: tingrett, literally "thing court") is the first court instance, and handles both criminal and civil cases. The chief judge of a district court is the chief district judge (Norwegian: sorenskriver).

The ruling of the district court may be appealed to the next level of court, the court of appeal, and the court of appeal's ruling may in turn be appealed to the supreme court, but only in select cases of precedential relevance admitted by the supreme court. Thus the vast majority of court cases are decided on by the district court or the court of appeal.

The term tingrett for the district courts was introduced in 2002, replacing the previous terms city court (byrett) and district court (herredsrett). Historically the district courts outside the cities were known as sorenskriveri (office of a sorenskriver), and consisted of a single (chief) district judge and often one or two assistant judges. The district usually included multiple parishes/municipalities, and the district judge was typically the highest state official within his jurisdiction, with an almost all-encompassing area of jurisdiction and an important role in the regional state administration.

== Criminal cases ==
Since August 1995, all criminal cases which go to court are tried at the district court first. Prior to this, the most serious cases were tried in the Court of appeal (lagmannsrett). Regular trials are usually held before a panel of three judges, one professional and two lay judges. In particularly difficult cases the bench may consist of five judges (two professional and three lay judges). Verdicts and sentences are determined by a majority vote, with the lay judges' votes counting the same as the professional judge. If there is a full confession, and the defendant agrees to it, the trial may be held before a single professional judge who hears the case and determines sentencing.

== Civil cases ==
The district court is the second tier in most civil cases, the first tier being the conciliation board (forliksråd). Certain cases cannot be held at the conciliation board, including family law, patent and trademark issues, cases against the authorities, and cases where an independent complaints committee has issued an opinion. In addition, larger cases where both sides are representad by attorneys, and other cases where extrajudicial mediation have taken place, may bypass the conciliation board and go straight to the district court. The district court also hears appeals from the conciliation board.

Civil cases are normally held before a single professional judge, but either side can demand two lay judges be seated as well. In some cases the law demands that there be two lay judges with competence in the subject matter.

As of 2021, there were 23 district courts in Norway.
