= Transport in Norway =

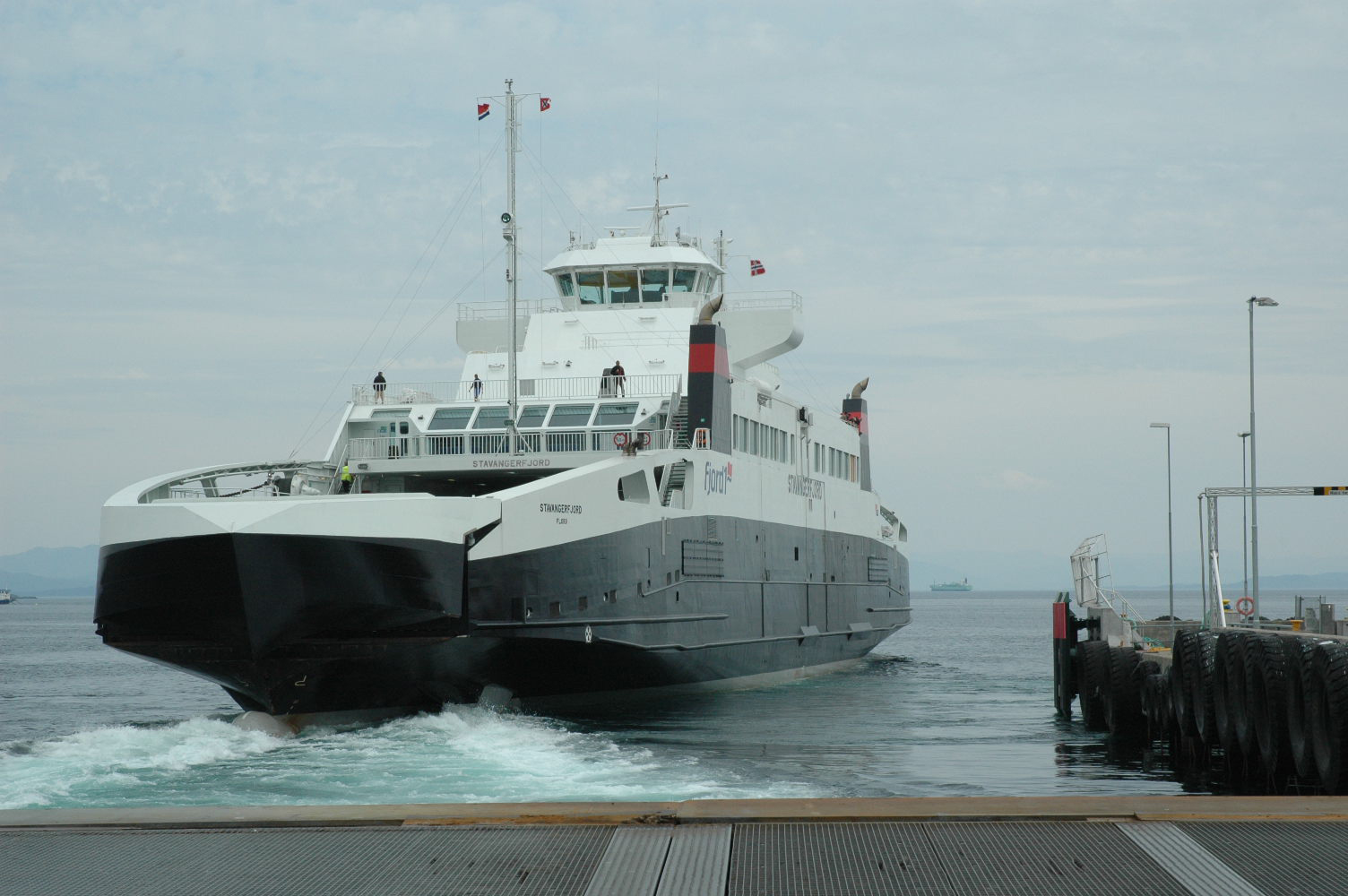
Car ferries are a vital part of the highway infrastructure in the coastal regions. Above is "MF Stavangerfjord" which goes between Arsvågen and Mortavika in Rogaland.

Transport in Norway is highly influenced by Norway's low population density, narrow shape and rugged coastline. Norway has old water transport traditions, but road, rail and air transport have increased in importance during the 20th century. Due to the low population density, public transport is somewhat less built out in rural areas of Norway, however public transport in and around cities is well developed.

The main governing body is the Norwegian Ministry of Transport and Communications, which performs operations through numerous subsidiaries. Tasks related to public transport and some roads have been delegated to the counties and municipalities. Most infrastructure is publicly owned, while most operations are performed by private companies; public transport is subsidized.

On average each Norwegian transported themselves for 70 minutes each day. In 2008 8% of passenger transport was made by public transport; road transport is the dominant mode of transport. It had risen to 10% in 2017. In 2014 22% of travel was on foot and 4% by bicycle. The transport sector was responsible for 4.1% of the gross national product and 6.6% of employment in 2006. According to the World Economic Forum's Travel and Tourism Competitiveness Report 2013, Norway placed 83 out of 140 countries regarding quality of roads, 47 out of 122 regarding quality of railroad infrastructure, 25 out of 140 regarding quality of port infrastructure and 54 out of 140 regarding ground transport networks.

== Civil aviation ==
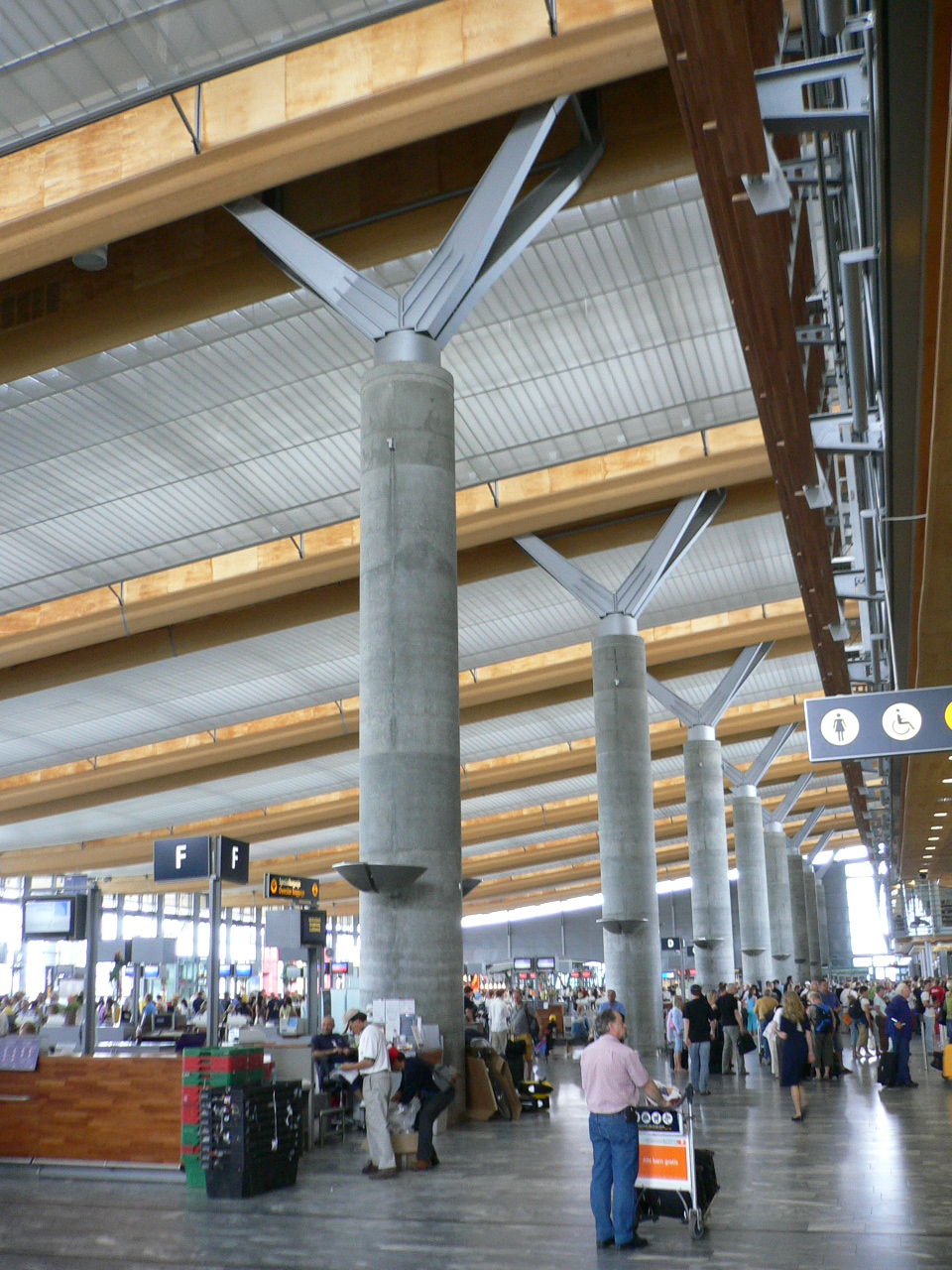
Oslo Airport, Gardermoen, Norway's main airport.

Aviation has become an important passenger transport mode since the 1960s. Aircraft is the commonly used mode of transport on longer distances, and the routes between Oslo and Bergen, Trondheim and Stavanger are all among the largest in Europe. On long distances, such as Oslo-Bodø and longer, air travel is by far the leading travel method. In Western and Northern Norway, with difficult terrain, obstacling fjords and lack of rail transport, regional airline travel provides quick travel within the region or to the capital.

Major airlines based in Norway are Scandinavian Airlines, Norwegian Air Shuttle and Widerøe.

=== Airports ===
Of the 98 airports in Norway, 51 are public, and 46 are operated by the state-owned Avinor. Seven airports have more than one million passengers annually. 41,089,675 passengers passed through Norwegian airports in 2007, of which 13,397,458 were international.

The main gateway by air to Norway is Oslo Airport, Gardermoen, located about 50 kilometres (31 mi) north of Oslo with departures to most European countries and some intercontinental destinations. It is hub for the three major Norwegian airlines Scandinavian Airlines System, Norwegian Air Shuttle, and Widerøe and for regional aircraft from Western Norway.

Heliports are common at hospitals and oil platforms. The Norwegian Air Ambulance service operates twelve helicopters and nine airplanes.

=== Regional aviation ===
The regional airport service was introduced in the 1960s, with 30 airports being served by short take-off and landing aircraft. These are located mainly in Sogn og Fjordane and Northern Norway, in areas with long distances to large cities and with too little traffic to support commercial flights. The airports, which typically have an 800 metres (2,600 ft) runway, are run by Avinor, while the airplanes are operated based on subsidized public service obligation contracts with the Norwegian Ministry of Transport and Communications. by the far largest contractor is Widerøe with their fleet of de Havilland Canada Dash 8 aircraft, but also Danish Air Transport, Lufttransport and Kato Airline have won bids. The flights operate from one or more regional airports to larger hubs; in Oslo, Bergen, Trondheim, Bodø, Tromsø and Kirkenes. One service, to Værøy Heliport, is served by helicopter. 1,214,508 passengers passed through the regional airports in 2012.

== Rail transport ==
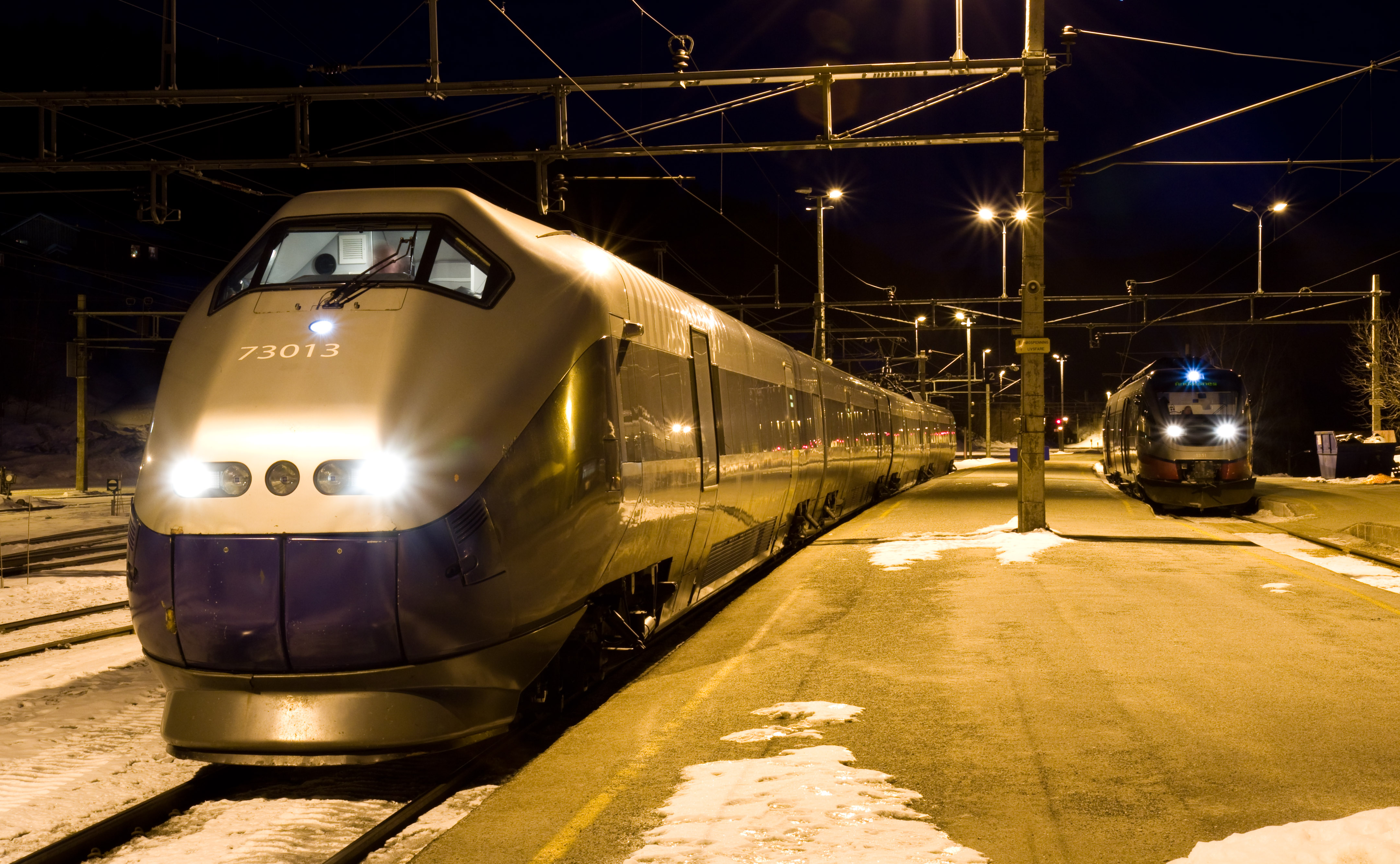
NSB type 73A at Dombås Station

The main railway network consists of 4,114 kilometres (2,556 mi) of standard gauge lines, of which 242 kilometres (150 mi) is double track and 64 kilometres (40 mi) high-speed rail (210 km/h) while 62% is electrified at 15 kV 16.7 Hz AC. The railways transported 56,827,000 passengers 2,956 million passenger kilometers and 24,783,000 tonnes of cargo 3,414 million tonne kilometers.

The main long-haul network consists of lines from Oslo and westwards along the South Coast to Stavanger and over the mountains to Bergen; and north to Åndalsnes and via Trondheim to Bodø. Four lines connect to Sweden, allowing access to the European network. The only high-speed line is Gardermobanen, connecting Oslo to The Oslo Airport, Gardermoen, but plans exist to build more high-speed lines in Eastern Norway, and possibly to other parts of Norway. The entire network is owned by the Bane NOR, while domestic passenger trains are operated by the Airport Express Train, Go-Ahead Nordic, SJ Norge and Vy. Several companies operate freight trains.

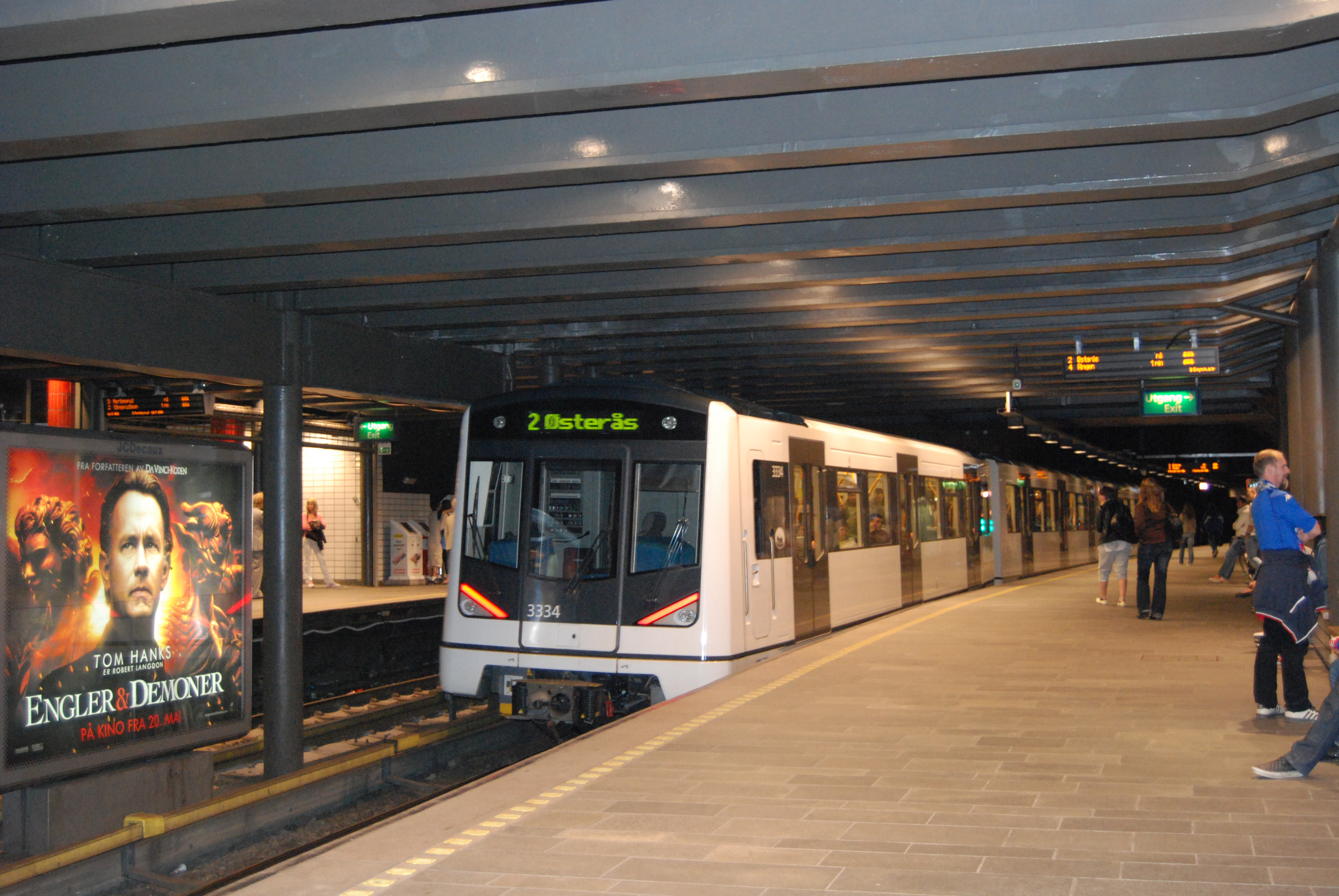
The Oslo T-bane is the backbone of public transport in Oslo, here at Nationaltheateret metro station.

Investment in new infrastructure and maintenance is financed through the state budget, and subsidies are provided for passenger train operations. NSB operates long-haul trains, including night trains, regional services and four commuter train systems, around Oslo, Trondheim, Bergen and Stavanger.

=== Rail transit ===
Tramways operate in Oslo, Trondheim and Bergen. The only rapid transit system is the Oslo T-bane, while the only funicular is in Bergen. The rail transits are operated by the counties, and the ticket system is integrated into the bus transport. In Oslo the two systems make the backbone of the Ruter public transport system, giving Oslo by far the highest public transport share of 20%. Local trains on the railway is operated by NSB, but monthly passes are integrated into the local transit ticket system.

In 2007, 101 million passengers were transported 490 million passenger kilometers by rail transit.

== Road transport ==
Norway has a road network of 92,946 kilometres (57,754 mi), of which 72,033 kilometres (44,759 mi) are paved and 664 kilometres (413 mi) are motorway. There are four tiers of road routes; national, county, municipal and private, with national and primary county roads numbered en route. The most important national routes are part of the European route scheme, and the two most prominent are the E6 going north-south through the entire country, while E39 follows the West Coast. An improved E39 coastal highway is currently under development to improve the route and reduce the driving time from 21 hours. It is expected to be completed in 2033 with a series of new tunnels and bridges, including Rogfast, a 27 kilometres (17 mi) under sea tunnel that will link Stavanger and Haugesund. National and county roads are managed by the Norwegian Public Roads Administration.

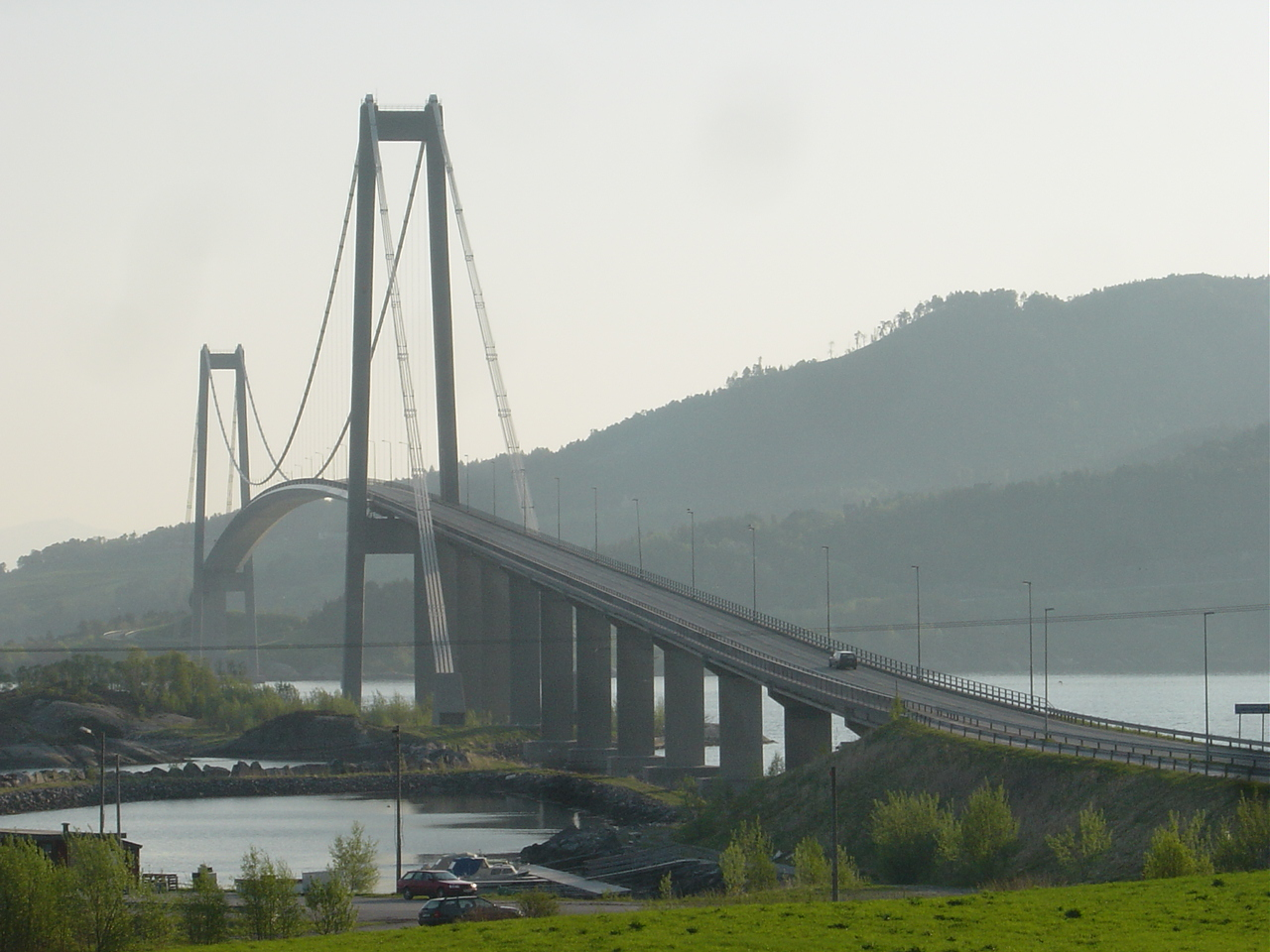
Gjemnessund Bridge is part of the Kristiansund Mainland Connection.

Motorways exist around the largest cities; many of the larger cities have introduced toll schemes to help finance roads. In 2008, 130 ferry routes remained in service, operated by private companies on contract with the Public Roads Administration. Since the 1970s the heaviest rural investments have been mainland connections to replace the many car ferries that are needed to cross fjords and connect to islands. There are not enough funding through tax money, so these tunnels and bridges are normally financed mainly through toll fees. Some mountain passes have severe snowstorm problems in the winter, so often they have to be closed, or cars have to drive after a snowplow in a column. The most exposed mountain passes are closed the entire winter.

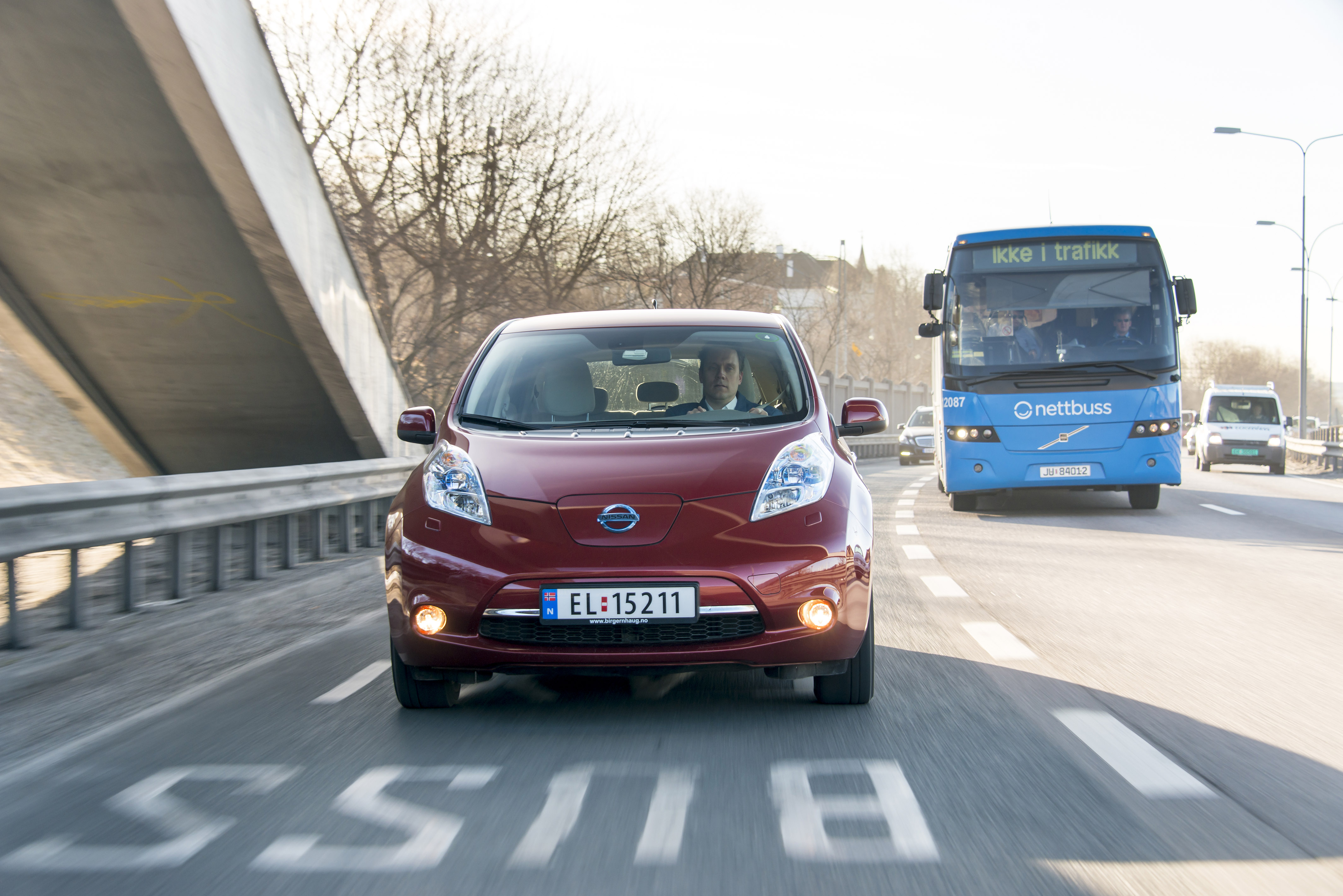
Norway has the largest stock of plug-in electric vehicles per capita in the world.

In 2007 there were 2.6 million automobiles in Norway, or 444 per 1000 residents, an increase of 27% the last ten years—average age was 10.2 years. Road accidents killed 242 people and road transport caused 20% of greenhouse gas emissions. Between 2007 and 2011, diesel cars constituted over 70% of new cars, and fell to 40% in 2015. Trucks transported 264 million tonnes 15 billion tonne kilometers.

Norway has the world's largest registered stock of plug-in electric vehicles per capita, with Oslo recognized as the EV capital of the world. In March 2014, Norway became the first country where over 1 in every 100 passenger cars on the roads is a plug-in electric. Norway's fleet of electric cars is one of the cleanest in the world because almost 100% of the electricity generated in the country comes from hydropower. As of December 2014, a total of 43,442 plug-in electric vehicles were registered in Norway, of which, almost 95% are all-electric vehicles. The Norwegian plug-in electric segment has the world's highest market share of new car sales, with 5.6% in 2013, and 12.5% in 2014.

=== Bus transport ===
Each county is responsible for the public bus and boat transport in their area, (railways, regional airlines and the Coastal Express boat, are financed by the state). Buses transported 290 million passengers 3.7 billion passenger kilometers in 2007. 6,194 buses were in operation during 2007; tickets sales was NOK 3,721 million while bus transport received government subsidies of NOK 3,393 million.

Bus and passenger boat services are normally operated by private companies on contract with the county or their public transport authority (such as Ruter or Vestviken Kollektivtrafikk). Tickets and tickets prices are organised by these authorities. Some of them have special brand names and connected painting of the buses, especially in bigger cities. Other counties, especially smaller, don't use brand names and let the operators decide bus paint.

Long-haul coach services are operated by various companies, most of whom cooperate through NOR-WAY Bussekspress. In Northern Norway (mostly from Fauske Municipality and further north) long-haul buses are operated by the counties.

== Water transport ==
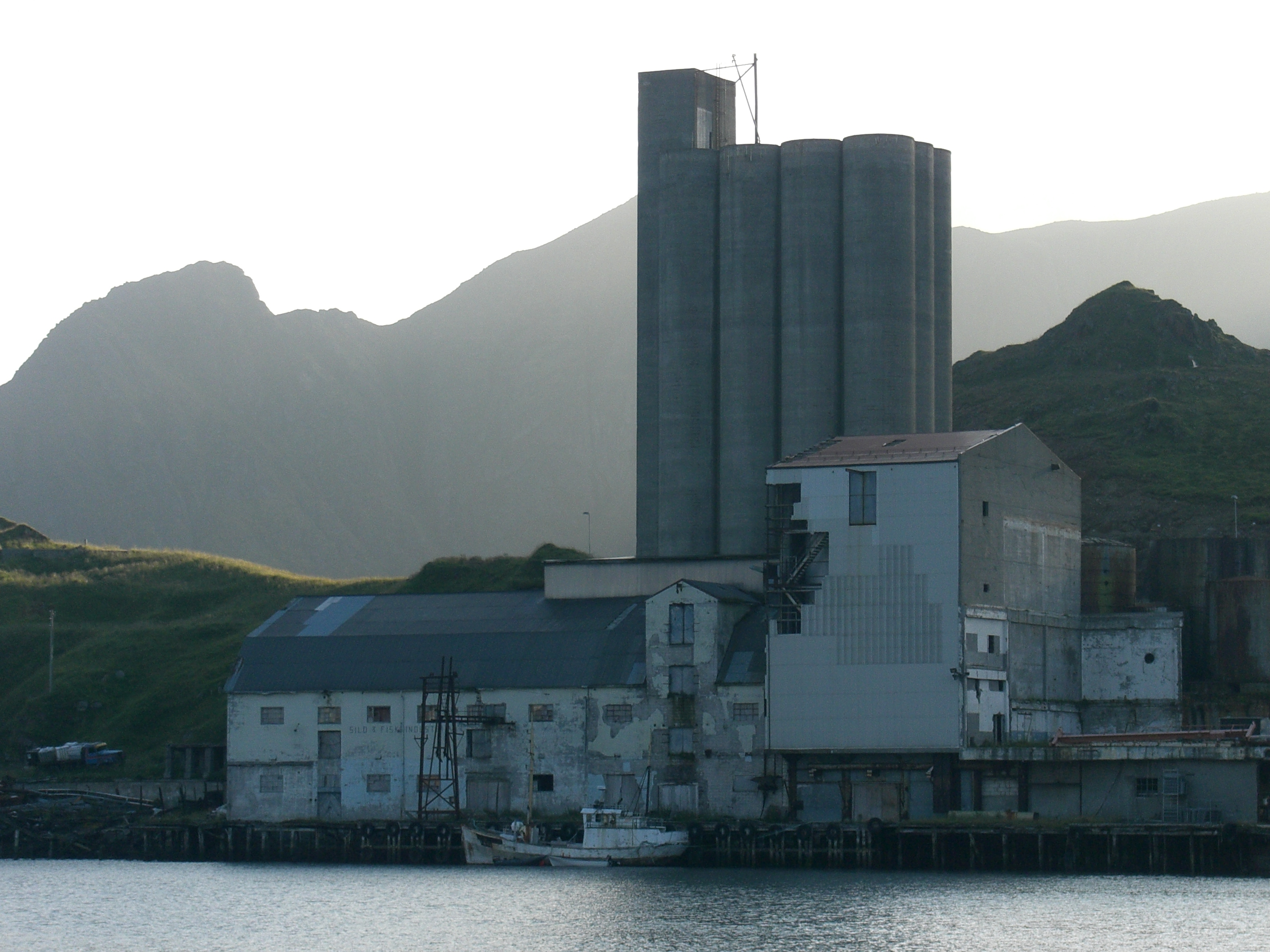
Grain silo in Honningsvåg.

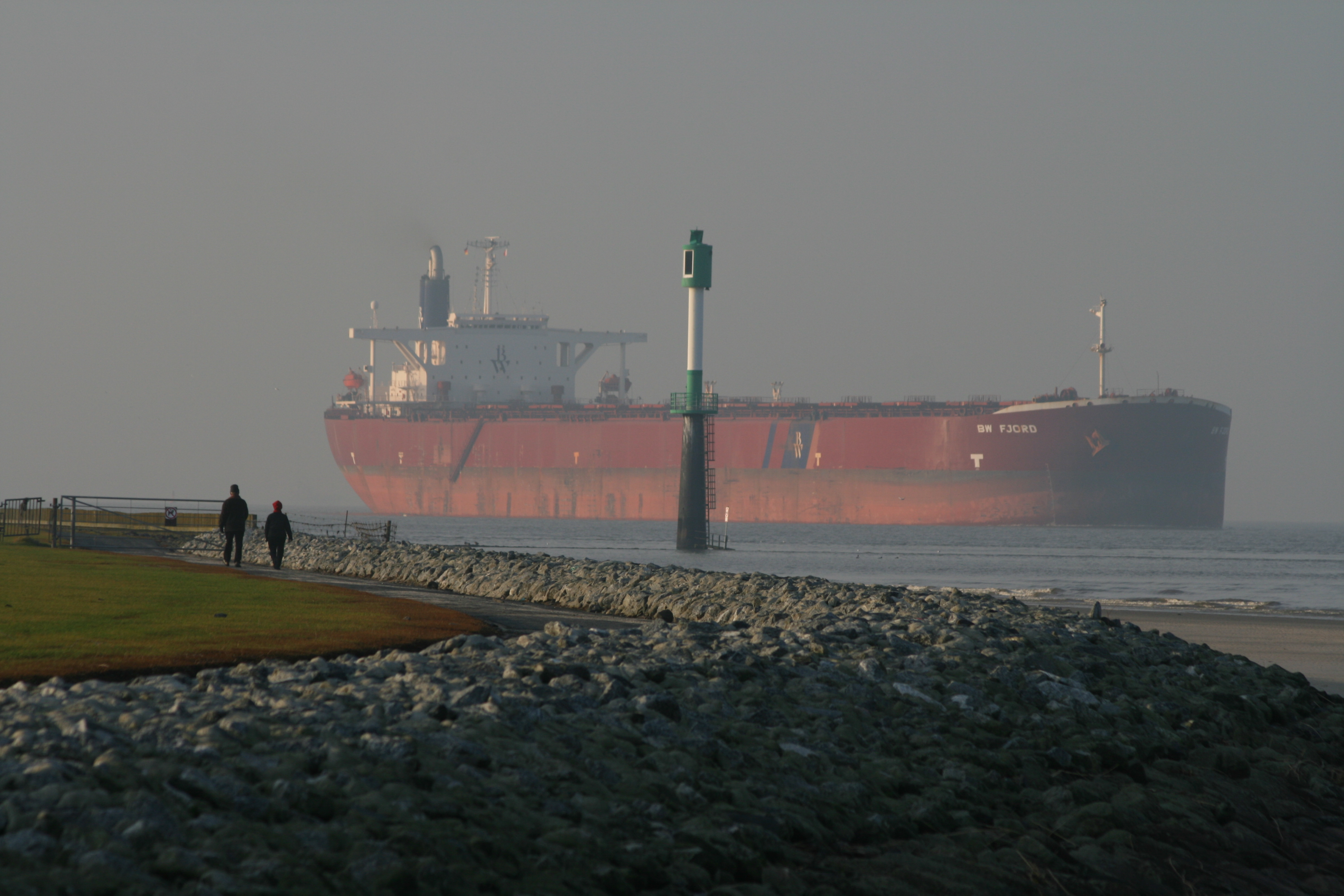
BW Fjord is one of many Norwegian ships that operate abroad.

The coastal infrastructure is operated by the Norwegian Coastal Administration, while ports are operated by the municipalities. Norway has 90,000 kilometres (56,000 mi) of shoreline, 400,000 leisure craft and a 715 ships in the merchant marine.

=== Merchant marine ===
In 2007 Norway was the fifth largest beneficial ship owning country, with 5% of the world's fleet; though a high portion of these were registered in flags of convenience, Norway had 15 million deadweight tonnage of ships under its flag. The government has created an internal register, the Norwegian International Ship Register (NIS), as a subset of the Norwegian Ship Register; ships on the NIS enjoy many benefits of flags of convenience and do not have to be crewed by Norwegians.

=== Ferries ===
Car ferries are vital links across fjords and to islands where there are no fixed connections. There are more than one hundred car ferry connections inside Norway. Fast passenger ferries operate many places where fjords and islands make it quicker to follow the waterways than the roads; some small islands are served by water buses. Public transport by ship transported eight million passengers 273 million passenger kilometers in 2007.

With the large amount of hydroelectricity in Norway, battery-electric ferries have been introduction on several routes. Of Norway's 180 ferries on 112 ferry routes, a study by Siemens and the Bellona Foundation identified 127 could be replaced with either fully electric or hybrid ferries.

The Coastal Express (known as Hurtigruten) operates daily cruiseferries from Bergen to Kirkenes, calling at 35 ports. International car carrying cruiseferries operate from Southern Norway to Denmark, Germany and Sweden.

=== Pipelines ===
The petroleum and natural gas production on the Norwegian continental shelf uses pipelines to transport produce to processing plants on mainland Norway and other European countries; total length is 9,481 kilometres (5,891 mi). The government-owned Gassco operates all natural gas pipelines; in 2006, 88 billion cubic meters were transported, or 15% of European consumption

== See also ==
- Norwegian Air Traffic Control System
