= Atlantsskip =

Icelandic shipping company

Atlantsskip was an Icelandic shipping company, established in 1998. Initially the Atlantsskip and TransAtlantic Lines, a sister in the United States, had their base in Keflavik. In April 2002 the company began to sail to ports in Europe, offering a weekly liner service, and in November 2005 it began to sail around the world. In delivering freight, it stops at the ports Kópavogur, Immingham, Vlissingen, and Esbjerg.

Atlantsskip owns and operates vessels A.S. Africa and Kársnes, which are both registered in Antigua and Barbuda.
