= J. Ludwig Mowinckels Rederi =

Norwegian international shipping company

A/S J. Ludwig Mowinckels Rederi
- Company type: Private
- Industry: Shipping
- Founded: 1898
- Headquarters: Bergen, Norway
- Area served: Global
- Key people: Børge Rosenberg (CEO)
- Revenue: US$45.5 million
- Operating income: $12.8 million
- Number of employees: 139 (2007)
- Website: www.jlmr.no

A/S J. Ludwig Mowinckels Rederi is a Bergen-based shipping company that operates eight tankers with six newbuildings. The company is privately owned and has divided ownership between one foundation and the Mowinckel family through the founder's J. Ludwig Mowinckel's wife Julie Mowinckel's will and testament - still after 30 years waiting to be settled. The foundation Magda Muller Mowincels Legat was set up in 1985 by Magda Mowinckel - the daughter of the founder - and aims to protect and serve for the company's economy and existence.

The portfolio consists of product tankers, shuttle tankers, and chemical tankers. Two newbuildings are bulk carriers. These vessels are registered in the Norwegian International Ship Register, the Norwegian Ship Register, on the Bahamas and on Malta. Chaterers include ExxonMobil, Statoil and Teekay. In 2007, the company reentered the dry bulk market by purchasing two panamax newbuilding contracts of 75,000 tonnes deadweight (DWT) from Golden Ocean Group for US$45 million. One of the company's vessels, the Strinda, was struck by a missile in Bab-el-Mandeb on 11 December 2023 as part of Houthi attacks on commercial shipping in the Red Sea.
