= MV Sygna =

Bulk carrier launched in 1967

Coordinates: 32°51′32.94″S 151°50′40.96″E

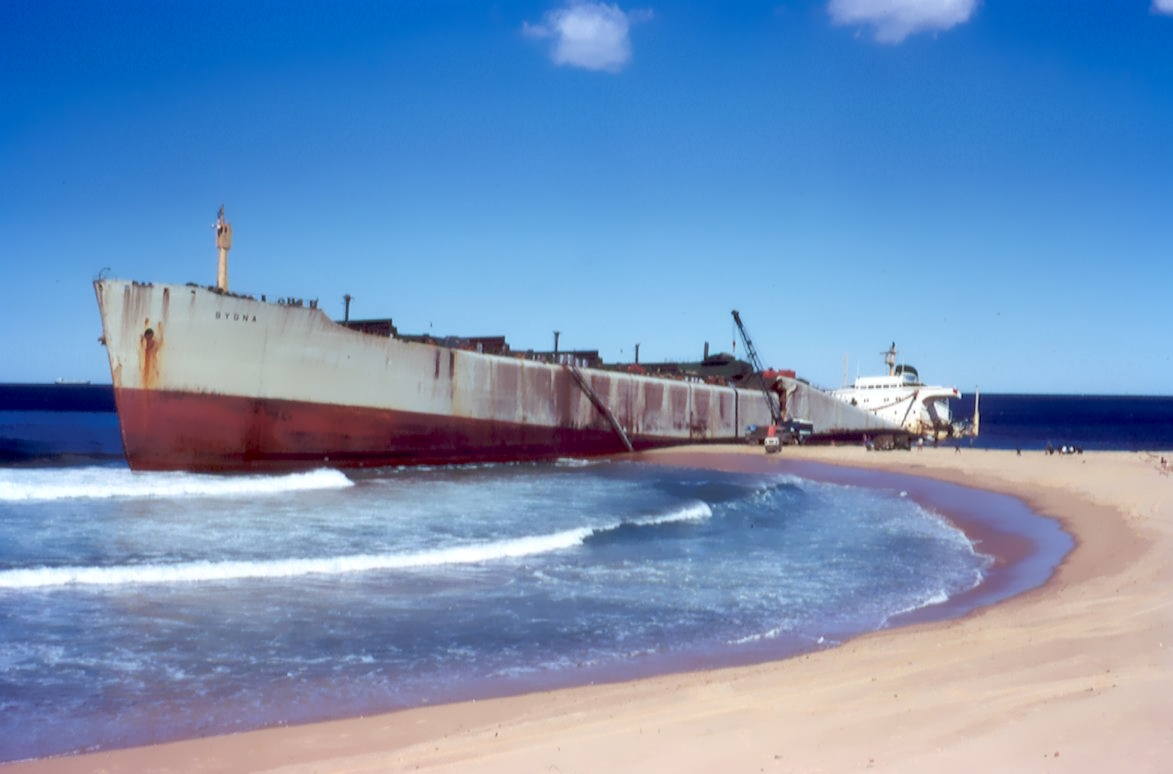
- Sygna shipwreck on Stockton Beach in November 1974

History

Norway
- Name: Sygna
- Owner: J. Ludwig Mowinckels Rederi
- Port of registry: Bergen, Norway
- Builder: Austin & Pickersgill, Sunderland
- Yard number: 848
- Launched: 25 July 1967
- Completed: November 1967
- Out of service: 26 May 1974
- Identification: IMO number: 6800593
- Fate: Ran aground on Stockton Beach, Australia during a storm on 26 May 1974

General characteristics
- Type: Bulk carrier
- Tonnage: 39,503 gross tons
- Length: 217.3 m (713 ft)
- Beam: 32.16 m (106 ft)
- Draught: 13.31 m (44 ft)
- Propulsion: Harland & Wolff, Belfast
- Crew: 30

MV Sygna was a Norwegian bulk carrier built by Austin & Pickersgill for J. Ludwig Mowinckels Rederi in 1967. It ran aground on Stockton Beach in Australia during a major storm in 1974. After its bow section was refloated, its stern remained beached and became an icon and landmark for the local area, until the visible remains of the wreck collapsed into the sea in 2016.

== History ==
Sygna was built by Austin & Pickersgill, Sunderland for J. Ludwig Mowinckels Rederi. With a gross tonnage of 39,503, it was built in two halves which were joined in a dry dock.

=== Storm ===
During May 1974 the New South Wales coast was being battered by large storms that brought heavy swells off both Sydney and Newcastle. Newcastle port reported a swell of over 17 m (56 ft) at the entrance.

Sygna was waiting for a load of 50,000 tonnes of coal destined for Europe at the time of the accident. It was anchored 4 kilometres (2.5 mi) off Newcastle when the Bureau of Meteorology issued a severe storm warning and directive for ships to move out to sea. Seven of the ten ships anchored off Newcastle did so; Sygna was not one of them.

=== Beaching ===
Early the following morning, with winds gusting at 165 km/h (89.1 kn), the captain issued orders to set sail. However, even with its engines at full-ahead Sygna was unable to make any headway and the storm turned it parallel to the beach and it ran aground.

With heavy seas pounding the stricken ship, its captain radioed a mayday and gave the order to abandon ship. An Iroquois helicopter from RAAF Base Williamtown's Search and Rescue Squadron rescued the 30 trapped sailors from the ship in near cyclone conditions. No one was injured or killed in the incident. Flight Lieutenant Gary McFarlane was awarded the Air Force Cross, with other members of his crew receiving commendations for their heroic efforts during the rescue.

Sygna lost approximately 700 tonnes of oil during the accident. This oil was mostly dispersed by the heavy seas, and no cleanup or recovery action was undertaken.

=== Salvage operations ===
After the storm had subsided the salvage operation commenced. The ship was swung around, which caused the heavier stern section to sink into deeper water. This caused the ship to break its back.

On 4 September a salvage team led by Japanese millionaire Kitoku Yamada refloated the ship after repairing several holes in the hull and then pumping out thousands of tonnes of water. The stern section was refloated first, followed by the bow, which had been resting deep in the sand. The bow remained afloat but unfortunately for the salvagers the stern again went aground about 80 m (262 ft) out from the beach and gradually settled in the sand as salvage crews stripped it of all items of value.

In November 1974 another salvage attempt was made of the stern of Sygna. This caused a very heavy oil spillage, which spread along a 16 kilometres (10 mi) stretch of Stockton Beach. Bulldozers attempted to bury the oil in the sand above the high-water mark. After lying in Salamander Bay in Port Stephens, the bow section was towed away in January 1976 and broken up in Kaohsiung, Taiwan.

=== Wreck ===
The stern lay on Stockton Beach, slowly decaying from the harsh elements in its environment. According to the Newcastle port authority, the Sygna was the last of 59 ships which have been lost on Newcastle shores.

On 14 January 2010 it was reported that the NSW National Parks & Wildlife Service and shipping experts believed that the Sygna could rust to the waterline within ten years. During storms on the weekend of 4–5 June 2016, the remaining superstructure collapsed into the ocean, leaving only a small part of the hull still showing above the waterline.

Degeneration of the Sygna over time

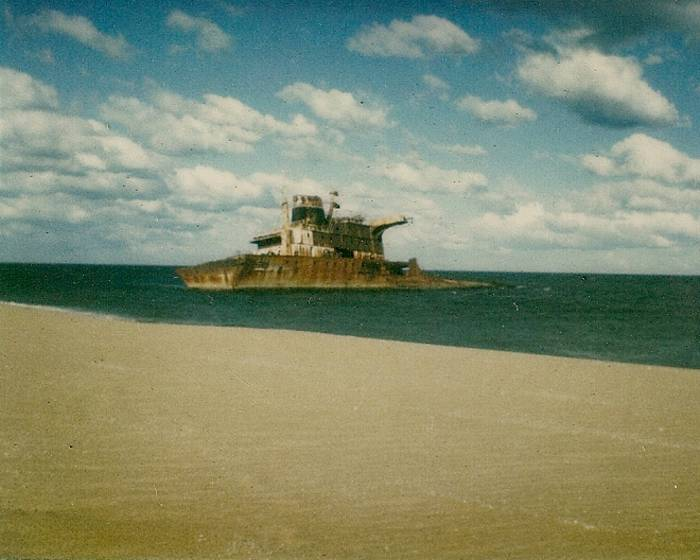
1984 (10 years)

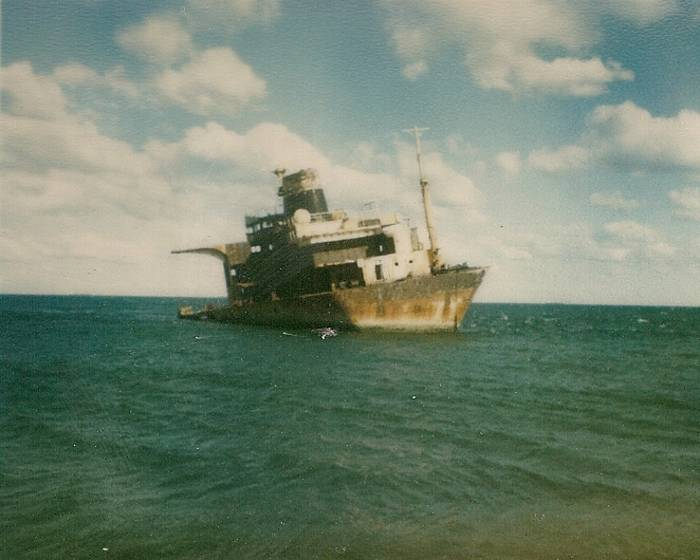
1984 (10 years)

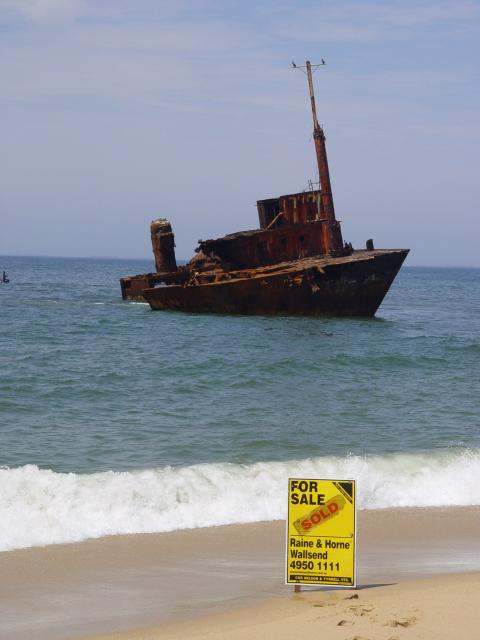
February 2004 (30 years)

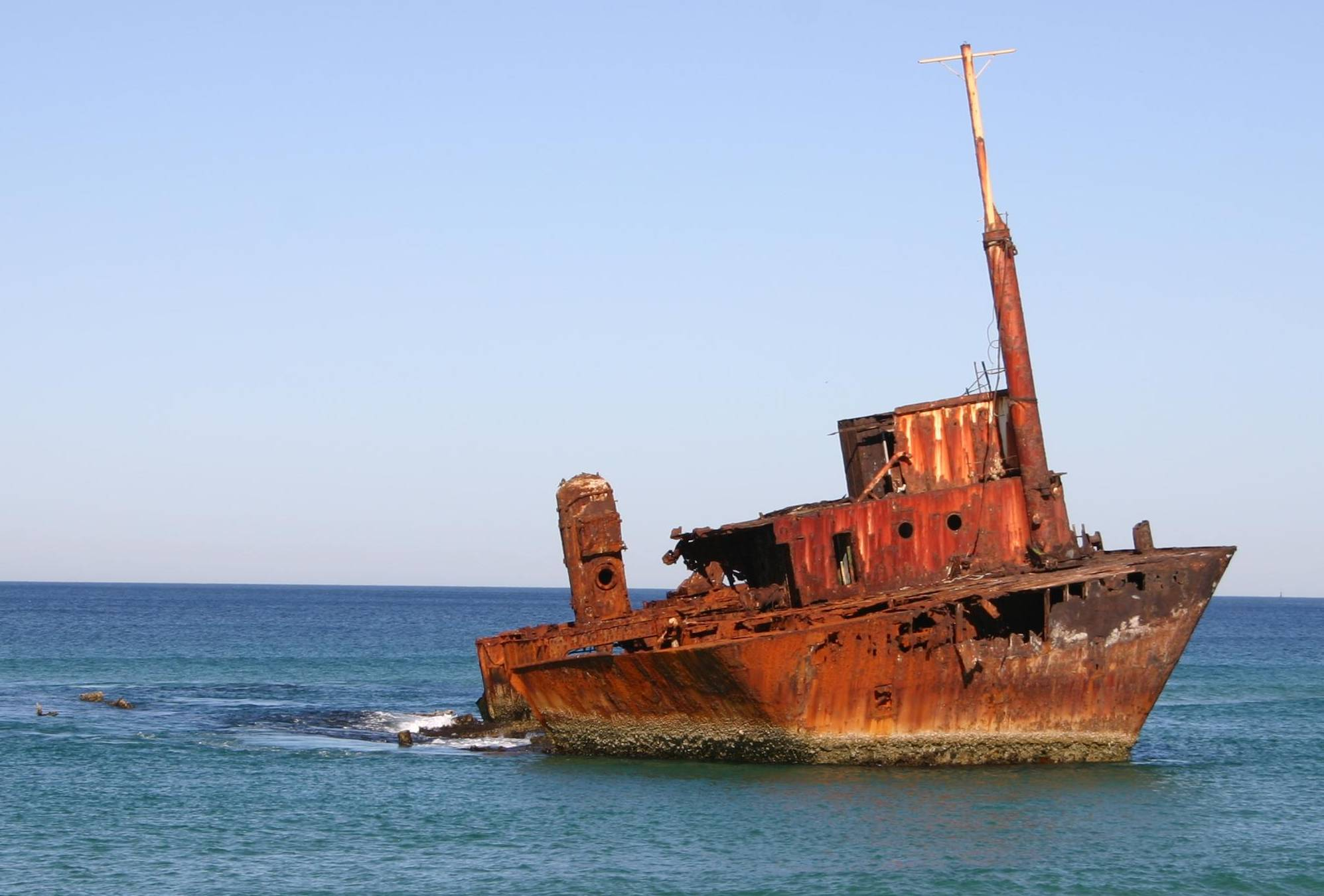
November 2004 (30.5 years)

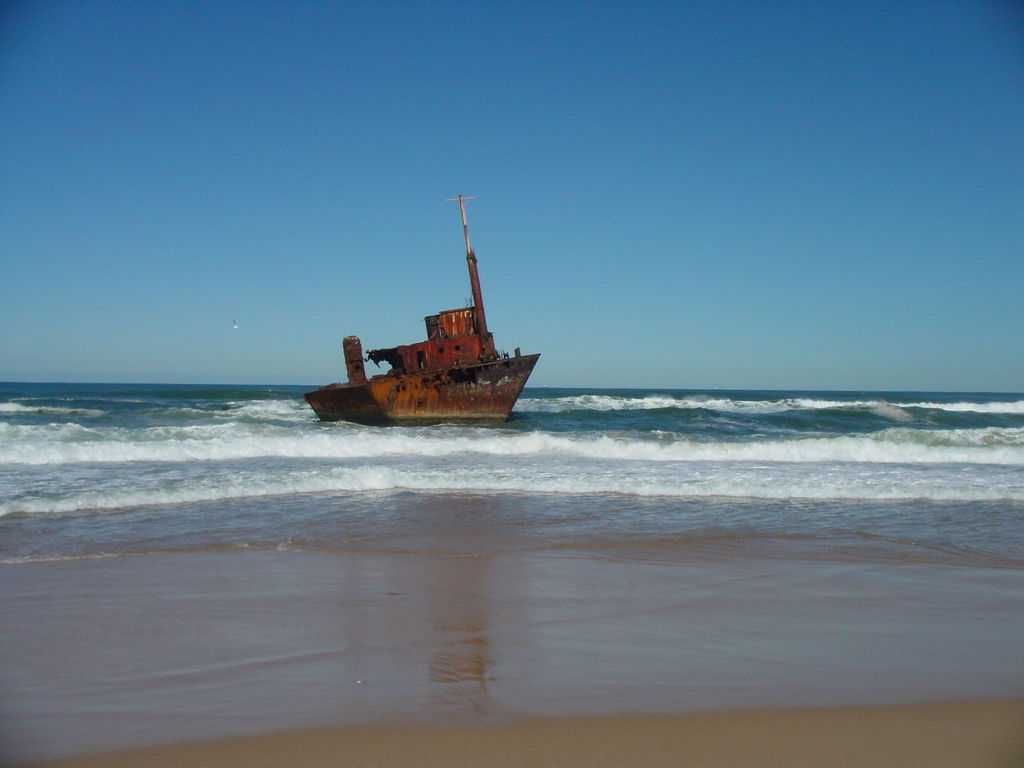
August 2005 (31 years)

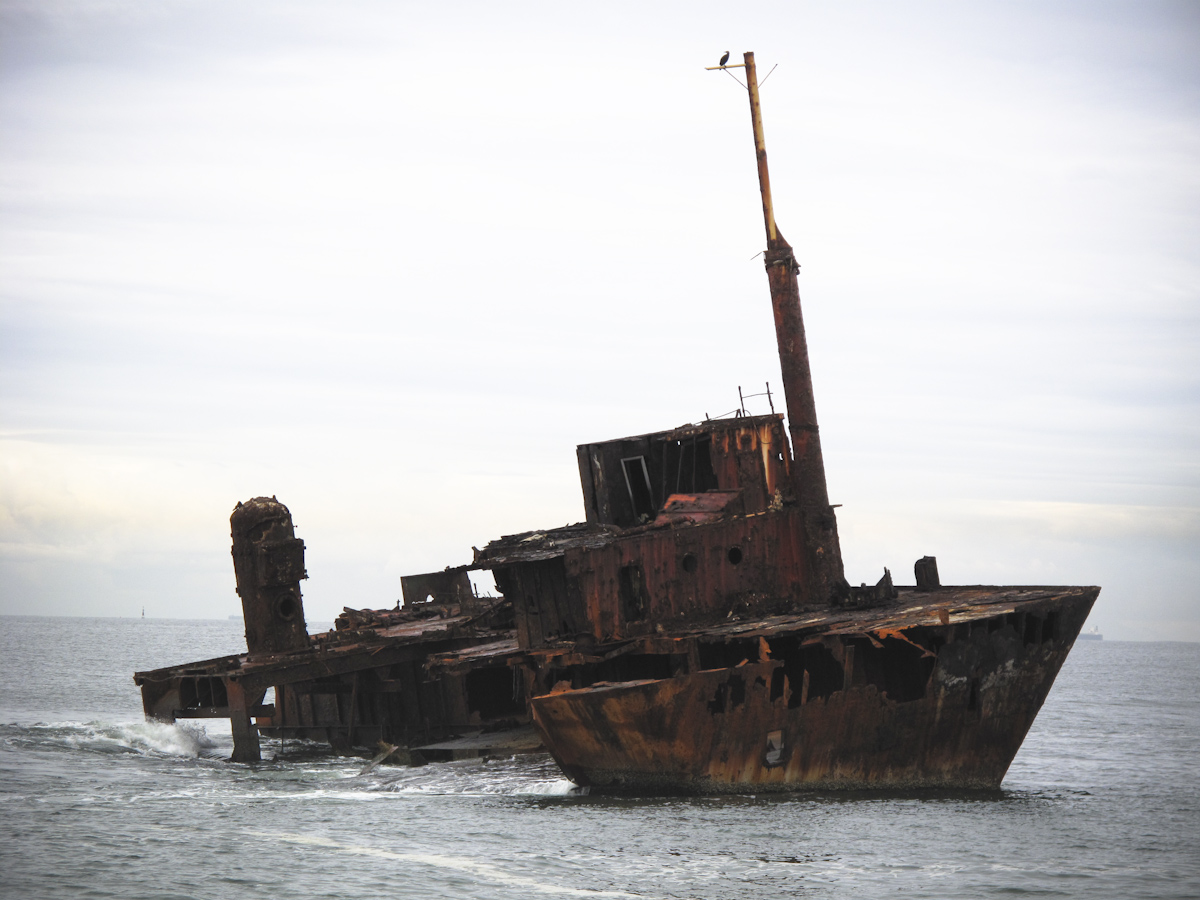
June 2009 (35 years)

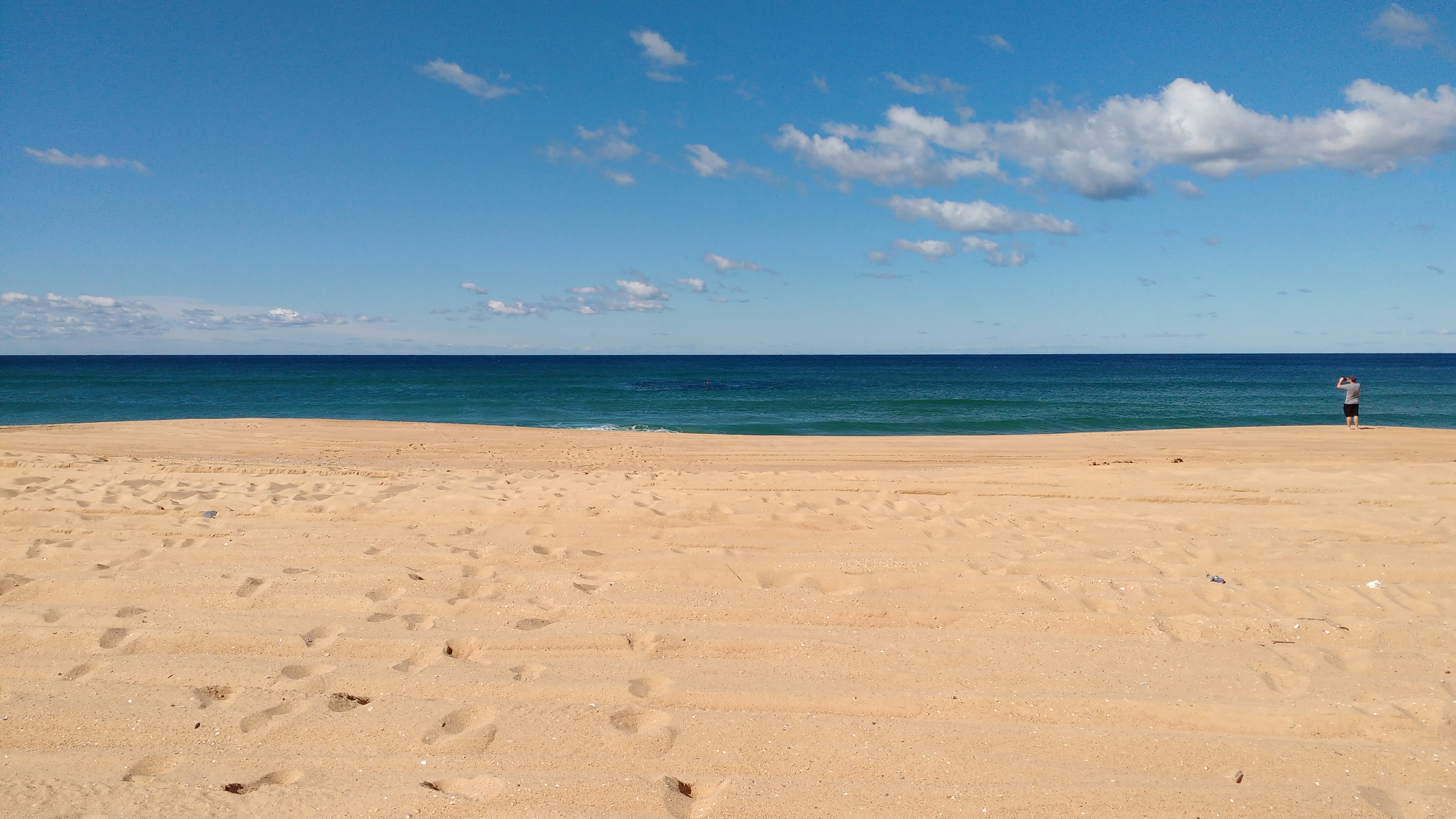
August 2016 (42 years)

Media related to IMO 6800593 at Wikimedia Commons
