= Spence (tugboat) =

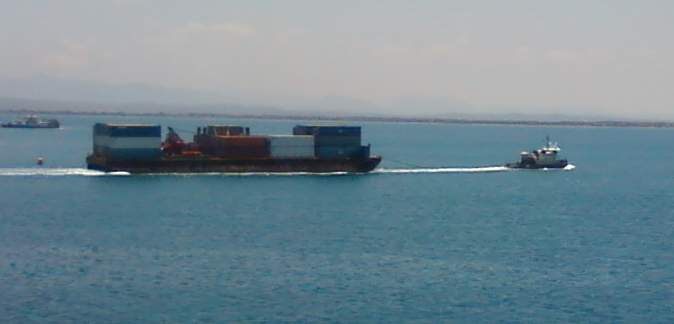
- Tugboat Spence

History

United States
- Owner: TransAtlantic Lines
- Builder: Bollinger Machine Shop & Ship Yard Inc.
- Completed: 1 September 1974
- Identification: Call sign WDC4261; IMO number: 7506780
- Fate: Sank on 14 December 2015

General characteristics
- Tonnage: 189 GT; 129 DWT
- Length: 27.78 m (91.1 ft)
- Beam: 7.92 m (26.0 ft)
- Depth: 3.50 m (11.5 ft) molded depth
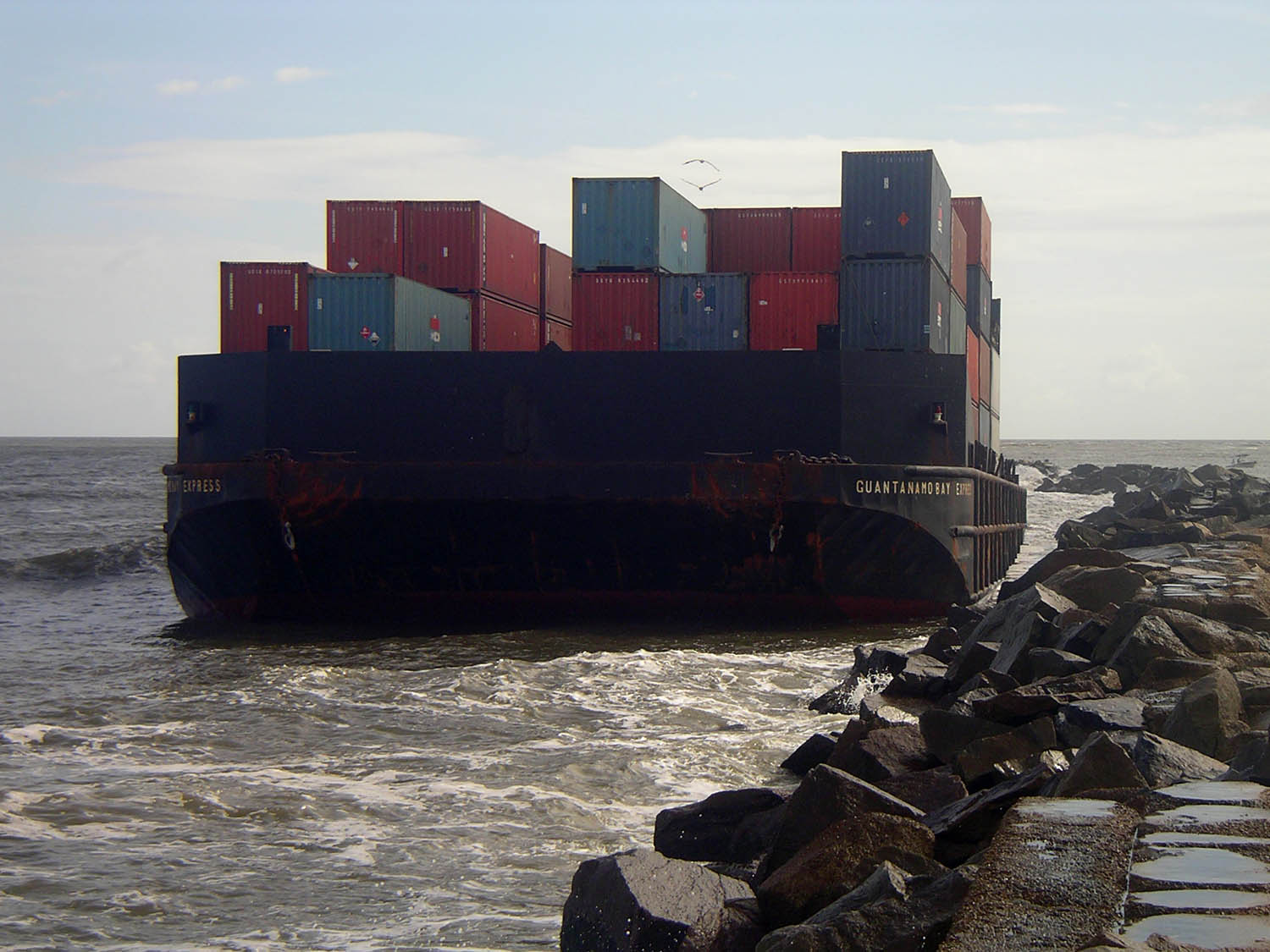
- Barge Guantanamo Bay Express aground near St. Johns River entrance.

United States
- Name: McAllister Dispatcher (1983–1985); Boston Trader (1985–1988); Columbia Boston (1988–2002); Guantanamo Bay Express(2002–)
- Owner: TransAtlantic Lines
- Builder: Misener Industries Inc.
- Completed: 1 September 1983
- Identification: IMO number: 8639118

General characteristics
- Tonnage: 2,529 GT
- Length: 76.2 m (250 ft)
- Beam: 21.95 m (72.0 ft)
- Depth: 4.88 m (16.0 ft) molded depth
- Approximate route of the tugboat Spence and barge Guantanamo Bay Express

Tugboat Spence and her barge Guantanamo Bay Express are owned by the American shipping company TransAtlantic Lines LLC. Together, they make a twice-monthly trip between Naval Station Mayport; near Jacksonville, Florida; and Naval Station Guantanamo Bay in Cuba. Each leg of the trip takes approximately 4 1/2 days and covers approximately 1,000 miles (1,600 km). Unloading the barge can take up to five days.

== History ==
On 13 June 2001, TransAtlantic Lines won a contract with an estimated cumulative value of $16,738,001 for dedicated ocean liner cargo service to US military installations in Guantanamo Bay, Cuba. This contract extended until 30 June 2004. The government announced the requirements for the charter on the World Wide Web on 4 December 2000, and seven bids were received. Military Traffic and Management Command in Alexandria, Virginia, is the contracting activity.

On 14 February 2002 the Department of Defense announced an award of contract DAMT01-02-D-0025, a $17,923,770 firm-fixed-price contract for the tug and barge combination. The contract required provision of international cargo transportation services using ocean common or contract carrier offering regularly scheduled commercial liner service for requirements that may arise in any part of the world. Contract requirements included provision of dedicated ocean, inter-modal, and related transportation services primarily between the Continental United States and Naval Station Guantanamo Bay, Cuba. There were seven bids solicited on 26 September 2001, and seven bids received. The Military Traffic Management Command located in Alexandria, Virginia was the contracting activity.

On 11 November 2004, while leaving Mayport, Florida en route to Guantanamo Bay, Cuba, the tow wires connecting the tug and barge parted, causing the barge to run aground. At the time of the accident, the vessels were experiencing 30-knot (56 km/h; 35 mph) wind gusts and 12-foot (3.7 m) seas. Extensive bottom damage and breaches to all port side voids were reported. The barge was refloated and delivered to the owners the following day. The vessels were owned by Pac-Atlantic Marine Leasing, LCC at the time.

On 14 December 2015 at approximately 15:45 the Spence suffered a sudden 25 degree list to starboard while in towing the Guantanamo Bay Express barge from a shipyard in Cartahena, Columbia where it had recently been overhauled and repaired to Guantanamo Bay, Cuba to resume its normal resupply mission. The crew, unable to correct the list and fearing that the vessel would sink, abandoned ship by coming alongside the barge and jumping over to its deck. At around 17:30 the tug, still tethered to the barge with three 1,600 ft. tow lines, sank below the surface. An hour or two later, the crew heard three sharp bangs which are assumed to be the tow lines breaking as the tug sank beyond the length of the tow lines on its way to settling to the bottom 11,500 feet below the surface. The crew were rescued by the coast guard cutter Decisive early in the morning of 15 December.

On 31 March 2017 the National Transportation and Safety Board released Accident Brief NTSB/MAB-17/07 which concluded that "the most likely sinking scenario involved gradual flooding in the aft void, which caused the aft deck to submerge and the vessel to enter a lolling condition, resulting in a sudden list to starboard. In this state, water would then have likely entered other spaces through downflooding points, causing progressing flooding and sinking by the stern without capsizing".

== Notes ==
- "Guantanamo Bay Express (218595)". Port State Information Exchange. United States Coast Guard.
