= Norwegian Ship Registers =

The Norwegian Ship Registers, sometimes called NIS-NOR (Norwegian: Skipsregistrene) is a Norwegian government agency responsible for operating the Norwegian International Ship Register, the Norwegian Ship Register and the Norwegian Shipbuilding Register. The register was from 1997 subordinate to the Norwegian Ministry of Trade and Industry (and not the Ministry of Transport) and based in Bergen, until the ship registers were transformed into a department in the Norwegian Maritime Directorate from 1 January 2012.
