= Norwegian Shipbuilding Register =

Domestic ship register in Norway

The Norwegian Shipbuilding Register (Norwegian: Skipsbyggingsregisteret) is a domestic ship register for ships under construction or contracts for building ships within Norway. The register is managed by the Norwegian Ship Registers and is subordinate to the Norwegian Ship Register.

== Registration ==
All ships over 10 metres can register, including offshore platforms and equivalent. The ship must be built at a Norwegian ship yard.
