= MV Transpacific =

MV Transpacific (T-1)
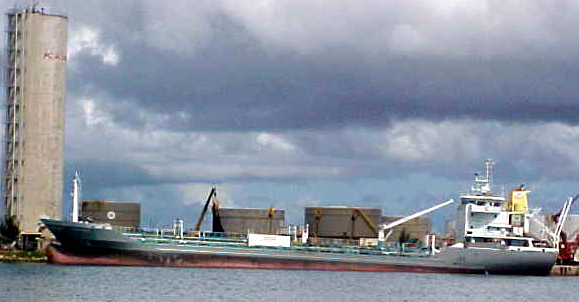
- Motor Tanker Transpacific

History
- Owner: TransAtlantic Lines LLC
- Port of registry: (United States) New York
- Route: Japan, Okinawa, Marshall Islands, Korea
- Builder: Çelik Tekne Shipyard
- Yard number: 30
- Laid down: December 29, 1999
- Launched: August 2, 2000
- Completed: October 2000
- Identification: Call sign: WDD4592; IMO number: 9217321
- Status: In service
- Notes: Originally ordered by Turcas Petrolculuk A.S.

General characteristics
- Class & type: 1A1 ICE-1C Tanker for Oil ESP E0
- Tonnage: 3,469 GT; 5,500 LT DWT
- Displacement: 7,587 metric tons
- Length: 109.1 m (358 ft)
- Beam: 16.03 m (52.6 ft)
- Installed power: 3 Yanmar 6N165L diesel generators
- Propulsion: 2,000 hp (1,500 kW) MAN AG B&W model 8L27/38 high-speed diesel
- Speed: 12 knots (22 km/h; 14 mph)
- Capacity: 30,000 barrels
- Crew: 13
- Notes: Has a controllable-pitch propeller and a tunnel-type bow thruster with 300kW of power.

MV Transpacific (2006 - 2012), also known as Bonito (2002 - 2006), also known as Turcas II (2001 - 2002), also known as Nikolay Shalavin (2001) is an oil tanker under long-term charter to the United States Military Sealift Command (MSC). As part of MSC's Sealift Program, the Transpacific transports fuel for the U.S. Department of Defense. Small and having shallow-draft, the Transpacific is known as a T-1 equivalent tanker, and moves petroleum products intra-theater in between Japan, Korea and The Marshall Islands.

The Transpacific was chartered from November 19, 2006 to September 30, 2008 on a daily rate of $18,848 under contract number N00033-06-C-5409.

== Owners and operators ==
The ship is owned and operated by TransAtlantic Lines LLC, an American shipping company based in Greenwich, Connecticut. This limited liability company was founded in 1998 by vice-president Gudmundur Kjaernested and president Brandon C. Rose. The company owns and operates 5 vessels, including one tug-and-barge combination. Four of these vessels are chartered by the Military Sealift Command, and perform duties such as delivering cargo to U.S. military activities in Diego Garcia and Guantanamo Bay, Cuba. TransAtlantic Lines has no collective bargaining agreements with seagoing unions.

From 2001 to 2002 the ship was known as MT Turcas II. It was sold on March 15, 2002 to Swedish company Donsötank for $9.5 million. Donsö Shipping KB owned the ship, then known as MT Bonito, until 2006. In 2006, the ship was bought by the company Goldcup D 1862 AB. TransAtlantic Lines LLC then bought it for $13,000,000.

From 2001 to 2006, the ship was operated by the company Rederi AB Donsötank, and registered in Sweden.

== Sealift charter ==
On July 20, 2006, the U.S. Navy's Military Sealift Command announced the charter for the Transpacific. The charter, which commenced October 1, 2006, is a one-year firm-fixed-price contract of $6,879,520 with additional reimbursables. The contract includes three additional one-year option periods and one 11-month option period which can total $25,589,458 plus additional reimbursables.

In each charter period, the government has the right to cancel after 60 days with 10 days notice. After each initial 60-day period, the government can cancel the charter with 30 days notice. The end of the base period of the charter is September 2007, and the charter will last until August 2011 if all options are exercised. This contract was competitively procured with more than 85 proposals solicited and three offers received.

The charter had previously been held by MV Montauk, operated by Sealift Incorporated. Sealift Incorporated protested the charter award with the Government Accounting Office (GAO), claiming that TransAtlantic Lines understated its fuel-consumption costs. The GAO denied this protest, as well as an additional technical complaint about what business entity actually employed crewmembers.

== Legal issues ==
On October 27, 2006 the District Court of Guam ordered TransAtlantic Lines to post a cash security of $310,000 to take possession of the vessel from Guam Industrial Services. TransAtlantic Lines posted the bond and took possession of the ship.

== Route and cargo ==
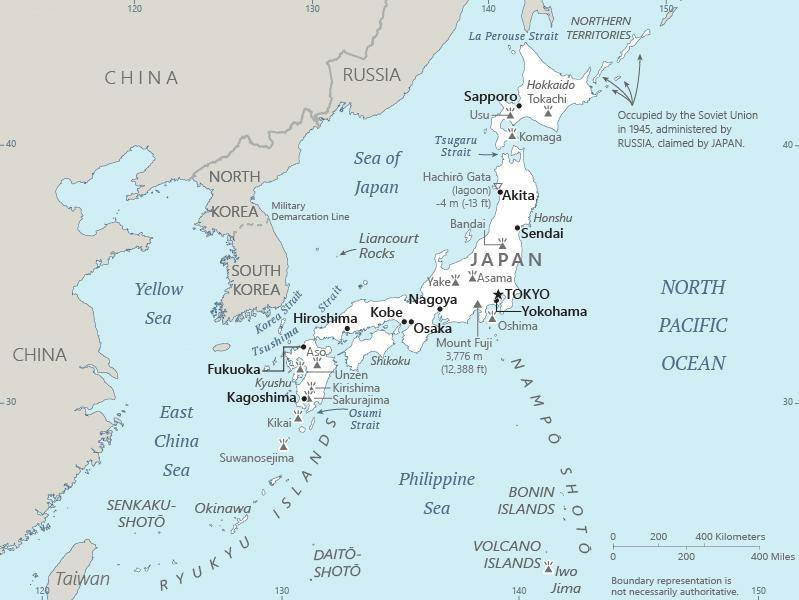
TransPacific works primarily in shallow-draft ports near Japan and Korea.

The ship routinely carries:

- Midgrade Unleaded Automotive Gasoline (MUM),
- JP-5 Jet Propellant, and
- Diesel Fuel Marine, also known as NATO F76.

The ship routinely visits:

- Hakozaki Defense Fuel Supply Point near United States Fleet Activities Yokosuka Japan,
- Hokkaido, Japan,
- Kin, Okinawa,
- Chimu Wan Base Terminal, Okinawa,
- White Beach Naval Facility, Okinawa,
- Hachinohe, Japan,
- The Ronald Reagan Ballistic Missile Defense Test Site at Kwajalein Atoll, and
- Yeosu, South Korea.

== See also ==
- TransAtlantic Lines LLC
- List of Military Sealift Command ships
- Oil tanker
