= MV Kalia =

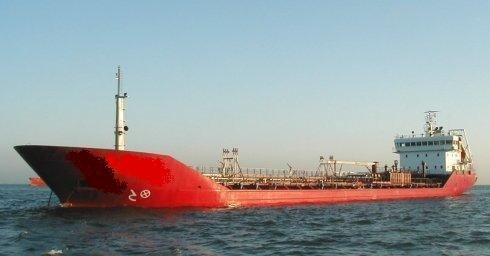
- MV Kalia (ex-Montauk) at sea

History
- Name: Montauk (1999–2007); Kalia (2007-present)
- Owner: Adminros Shipmanagement Co
- Operator: Adminros Shipmanagement Co
- Port of registry: Cyprus
- Yard number: 22
- Laid down: 28 February 1998
- Launched: 1 August 1999
- Completed: 2000
- Acquired: 27 November 2000
- Identification: Call sign: C4SK2, IMO number: 9190834

General characteristics
- Type: Oil tanker
- Tonnage: 3,457 GT
- Displacement: 5,780 t (5,690 long tons)
- Length: 357.9 ft (109.1 m)
- Beam: 52.5 ft (16.0 m)
- Draught: 18.6 ft (5.7 m)
- Decks: 5
- Ice class: 1A1 ICE-1C
- Propulsion: diesel, one propeller
- Speed: 12 knots (22 km/h; 14 mph)
- Crew: 13

MV Kalia (formerly the MV Montauk) is a small double-hulled oil tanker managed by Adminros Shipmanagement Company, Ltd. and registered under the flag of Cyprus. The 109-meter-long ship has a nominal crew of 13 and can carry 30,000 barrels (4,770 m^{3}) of oil. While known as the MV Montauk, the ship was owned by the American company Sealift Incorporated, and sailed under long-term charter to the United States Military Sealift Command where it transported oil for the U.S. Department of Defense. In 2015 it was renamed Alia.

== History ==
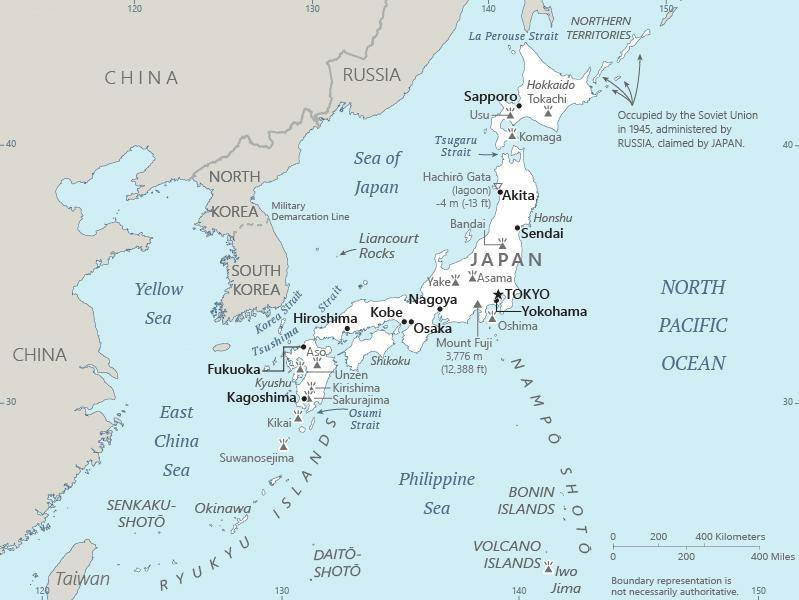
As Montauk, the ship worked primarily near Japan and Korea.

External image
- Kalia pierside in Geneva, June 2009.
- Kalia grounded at Guaiba Lake, September 2007.

Originally called Bitten Theresa, construction on the ship began on 28 February 1998, when its keel was laid in Tuzla, Istanbul, Turkey. The ship was built by the Turkish company Gemak Shipbuilding Industry and Trading S.A. The build was finished in 1999, and in 2000, the American company Sealift Incorporated purchased the vessel, registered it under the United States flag, and renamed it Montauk.

On 27 November 2000 the vessel was awarded a long-term charter by the US Navy Military Sealift Command. This charter, previously held by T-1 tanker MV Valiant, was a $10,751,304 firm fixed-price contract with reimbursables. The hire made Montauk one of two tankers under long-term charter to MSC at the time, and put Montauk under control of the Defense Energy Support Center, which procures fuel for U.S. military operations worldwide. Options in the contract brought its estimated cumulative value to $27,730,162. Military Sealift Command solicited more than 120 proposals for the charter and received five offers.

In the charter's first three fiscal years, Montauk made over 125 voyages, providing shuttle service between suppliers and shallow-draft depots in South Korea and Japan. The ship remained similarly tasked until 2006.

On 20 July 2006, MSC announced that Montauk's charter had been awarded to the MV TransPacific. The TransPacific charter, which commenced on 1 October 2006, was a one-year firm fixed-price contract of $6,879,520 with some operating costs reimbursable. The contract included three additional one-year option periods and one 11-month option period which can total $25,589,458 including reimbursements. The contract's base period ended in September 2007, but, if all options are exercised, the charter will continue until August 2011 . This contract was competitively procured with more than 85 proposals solicited and three offers received.

Sealift Incorporated protested the charter award with the Government Accounting Office (GAO), claiming that TransAtlantic Lines LLC understated its fuel-consumption costs. The GAO denied this protest, as well as an additional technical complaint about what business entity actually employed crewmembers.

On 24 January 2007, Ocean Tankers Holdings Public Company Limited purchased the ship and renamed it Kalia. The purchase made Kalia the company's fourth tanker. Ocean Tankers is a Cyprus-based ships-management and maintenance company, with a subsidiary company for each of its four ships. Its subsidiary company Kalia Maritime Co Ltd, is registered in Cyprus and owns Kalia.

== See also ==
- Sealift Incorporated
- List of Military Sealift Command ships
