= TransAtlantic Lines =

Coordinates: 41.029795°N 73.624186°W

TransAtlantic Lines LLC
- Type: Limited liability company
- Founded: February 1, 1998
- Headquarters: 6 Lincoln Ave Greenwich, Connecticut 06830-5751, USA
- Key people: Gudmundur Kjaernested, Co-Founder and Vice-President,
- Services: Shipping
- Website: None

TransAtlantic Lines LLC is an American shipping company based in Greenwich, Connecticut. The limited liability company was founded in 1998 by vice-president Gudmundur Kjaernested The company owned and operated 5 vessels, including one tug-and-barge combination. Four of these vessels were chartered by the Military Sealift Command, and performed duties such as delivering cargo to U.S. military activities in Diego Garcia. TransAtlantic maintains resident agents in the U.S. District of New York and other federal Districts to receive service of process. TransAtlantic Lines had no collective bargaining agreements with seagoing unions.

== History ==
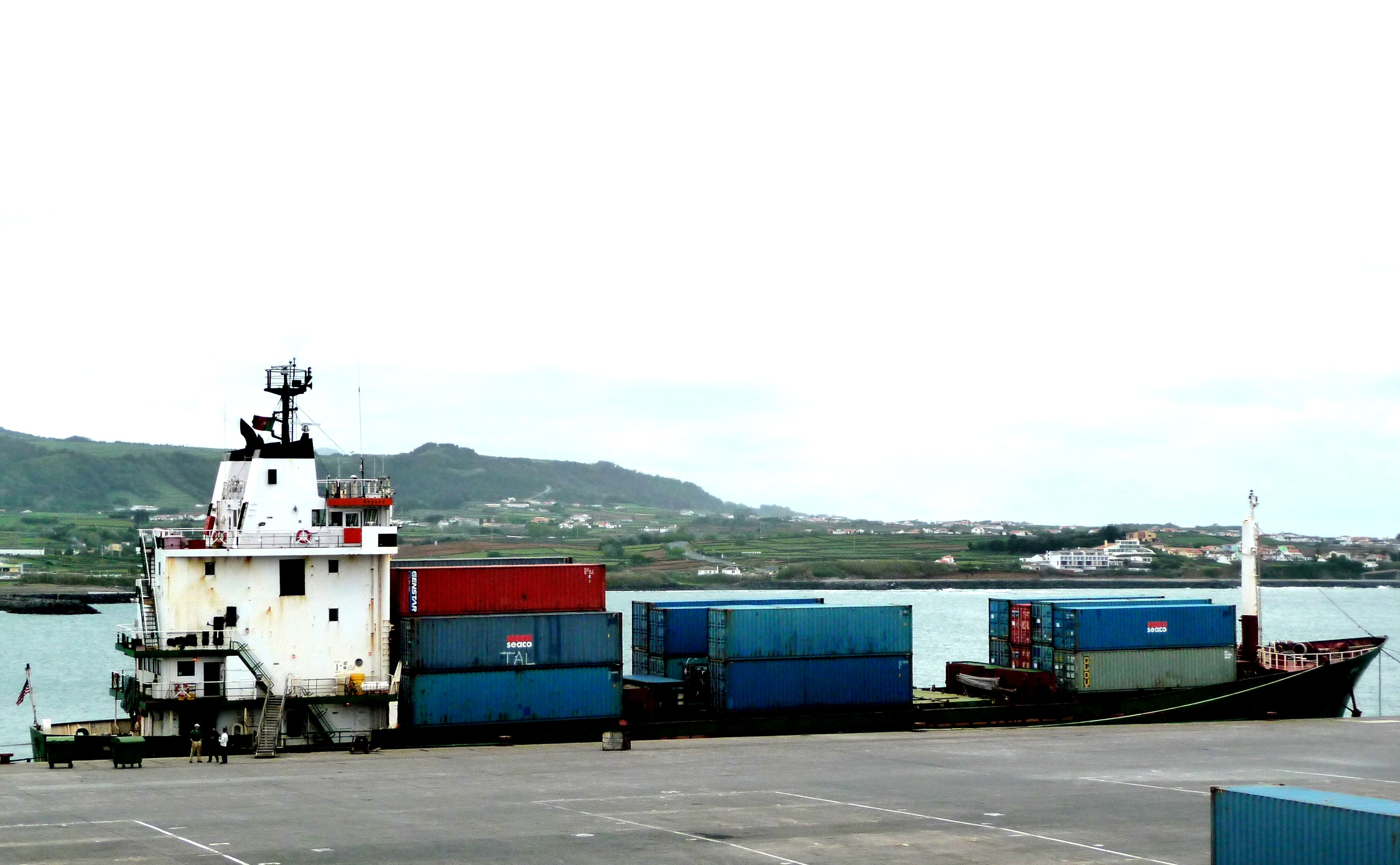
M/V Geysir was TransAtlantic's first ship.

In 1997, Gudmundur Kjærnested decided to start a shipping company to serve the Iceland route. Then an Icelandic citizen, educated in the United States, and having worked at Van Ommeren shipping for seven years, he was familiar with the route and its history. Kjarnested is a citizen of Iceland and U.S. resident alien who was married on May 20, 2000 to U.S.-national Margaret Elizabeth Bozzi. He is also president of Atlantsskip in Reykjavík, Iceland. The two were originally even partners in both ventures, and are also the primary owners of the Icelandic company TransAtlantic Lines-Iceland EHF (TLI). Shortly thereafter, they accepted an offer from shipping company American Automar to purchase the company.

TAL Timeline

The company made several preparations to bid for the Iceland contract. The company did not yet own any ships, but did secure four letters from U.S. shipping companies pledging to supply vessels sufficient to cover the charter requirements. One of the pledged vessels was the supply boat Native Dancer.

Eight bids for the 1998 U.S.–Iceland run were solicited by the Military Traffic Management Command on 30 January 1998, and six bids were received. Observers speculate that the bids were from the Icelandic company Eimskip, Dutch shipping company Van Ommeren, Atlantsskip, TransAtlantic Lines, and TransAtlantic Lines Iceland. In September 1998, the Military Traffic Management Command awarded 65% of the Iceland contract to TransAtlantic Lines Iceland, the lowest overall bidder, and the remaining 35% to the TransAtlantic Lines LLC, the lowest bidder among American shipping companies. The portion awarded to TransAtlantic Lines LLC had a cumulative total value of $5,519,295 and was set to expire by 31 October 2000.

Within a month, TransAtlantic re-flagged Juno to the United States and renamed it Geysir at the Port of Jacksonville. In response to the awards, the government of Iceland lodged a protest with the U.S. State Department, arguing that "TLI was not a true Icelandic shipping company" and "lacks the necessary experience, technical capability, financial responsibility, and material connection with Iceland". Shipping companies Van Ommeren Lines (USA) and Eimskip of Iceland, which had previously serviced the Iceland route, sued the United States protesting the award. The district court found for Van Ommeren and Eimskip, requiring the Army to restart the bidding process. TransAtlantic appealed the decision, and on 11 January 2000 the Court of Appeals reversed the lower court's decision, finally securing the contract for TransAtlantic.

On June 13, 2001, the company won a contract with an estimated cumulative value of $16,738,001 for dedicated ocean liner cargo service from Jacksonville, Florida to U.S. military installations in Guantanamo Bay, Cuba. This contract extended until June 30, 2004. The government announced the requirements for the charter on the World Wide Web on December 4, 2000, and seven bids were received. Military Traffic and Management Command in Alexandria, Virginia, is the contracting activity. The company uses the tugboat Spence and its barge the Guantanamo Bay Express make the twice-monthly trip between Jacksonville and Guantanamo Bay. Each leg of the trip takes approximately 4 and 1/2 days and covers approximately 1,000 miles (1,600 km).

On November 11, 2004, while leaving Mayport, Florida en route to Guantanamo Bay, Cuba, the two wires connecting the tug and barge parted, causing the barge to run aground. At the time of the accident, the vessels were experiencing thirty knot wind gusts and 12-foot (3.7 m) seas. Extensive bottom damage and breaches to all port side voids were reported. The barge was refloated and delivered to the owners the following day. The vessels were owned by Pac-Atlantic Marine Leasing, LCC at the time.

In 2004, Carsten Rehder affiliate company Rehder & Arkon bought MV Steamers Future in April 2004, and renamed her MV Baffin Strait. Rehder & Arkon chartered her for 6 months to Mariana Express Lines, and sold her to TransAtlantic Lines in late October 2004. TransAtlantic Lines bought her for US$6.3M.

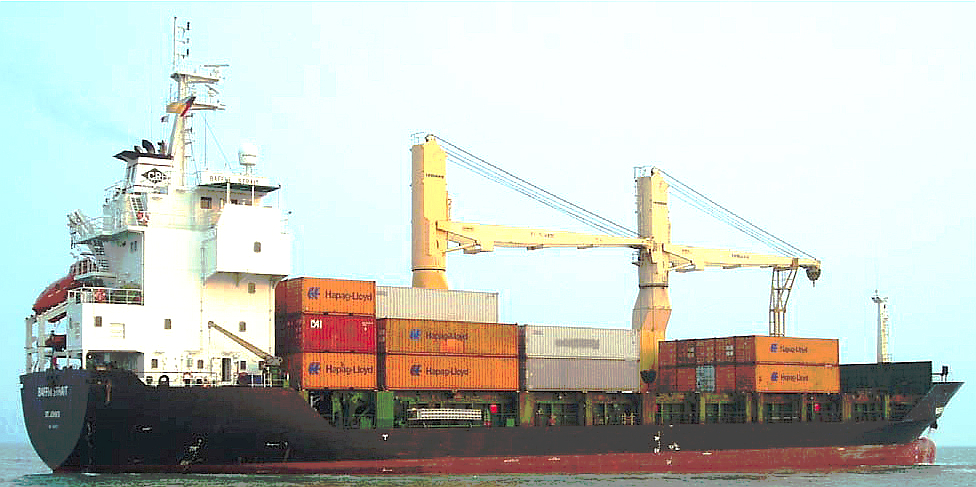
MV Baffin Strait circa 2007.

MV Baffin Strait is one of Military Sealift Command's seven container ships and is part of the 28 ships in the Sealift Program Office. Since 2004, the ship, often referred to as the 'DGAR shuttle,' has been chartered to deliver 250 containers each month from Singapore to Diego Garcia. The ship carries everything from fresh food to building supplies to aircraft parts, delivering more than 200,000 tons of cargo to the island each year." On the return trip back to Singapore, she carries recyclable metals. In 2004, TransAtlantic Lines outbid Sealift Incorporated for the contract to haul cargo between Singapore and Diego Garcia. The route had previously been serviced by Sealift Inc.'s MV Sagamore which was crewed by members of American Maritime Officers and Seafarer's International Union. TransAtlantic Lines reportedly won the contract by approximately 10 percent, representing a price difference of about $2.7 million.

As a result of winning this contract, the US Navy gave the Baffin Strait the hull classification symbol (T-AK W9519). The T-AK series symbol is given to the seven container ships chartered by MSC but owned and operated by contractors. The Baffin Strait's current charter runs from January 10, 2005 to September 30, 2008 on a daily rate of $12,550 under contract number N00033-05-C-5500.

In 2006, TransAtlantic bought the MT Bonito, then registered in Sweden, from Donsö Shipping KB for $13,000,000, and renamed it MT TransPacific. On 20 July 2006, the U.S. Navy's Military Sealift Command announced the charter for the Transpacific. The charter, which commenced 1 October 2006, is a one-year firm-fixed-price contract of $6,879,520 with additional reimbursables. The contract includes three additional one-year option periods and one 11-month option period which can total $25,589,458 plus additional reimbursables.

In each charter period, the government has the right to cancel after 60 days with 10 days notice. After each initial 60-day period, the government can cancel the charter with 30 days notice. The end of the base period of the charter is September 2007, and the charter will last until August 2011 if all options are exercised. This contract was competitively procured with more than 85 proposals solicited and three offers received.

The charter had previously been held by MV Montauk, operated by Sealift Incorporated. Sealift Incorporated protested the charter award with the Government Accounting Office (GAO), claiming that TransAtlantic Lines understated its fuel-consumption costs. The GAO denied this protest, as well as an additional technical complaint about what business entity actually employed crewmembers.

On 3 February 2009 the United States Transportation Command awarded TransAtlantic a $15,078,334 contract to carry cargo between the United States and the terminal in Praia da Vitoria, Azores. This contract, serviced by the Geysir, is expected to be completed by 29 February 2012, and was a 100 percent Small Business Set Aside acquisition with two bids received.

As of 2010, TransAtlantic Lines owns and operates 5 vessels, including one tug-and-barge combination. Four of these vessels are chartered by the Military Sealift Command, and perform duties such as delivering cargo to U.S. military activities in Diego Garcia and Guantanamo Bay, Cuba. TransAtlantic Lines has no collective bargaining agreements with seagoing unions.

== Fleet ==
Name	Type	Owns	Operates	Length	Delivery Date	Gross Tonnage	Image
MV Geysir	General cargo ship	Yes	Yes	83.5152 m (LBP)	1 June 1980	2,266	
MV TransAtlantic	General cargo ship/container ship	Yes	Yes	100.59 m (LOA)	1997	4,276	
MT Transpacific	Petroleum tanker	Yes	Yes	109.1 m (LOA)	2001	3,469	
Barge Guantanamo Bay Express	Deck cargo barge	Yes	Yes	76.2 m (LBP)	1 September 1983	2,529	
Tugboat Spence	Tugboat	Yes	Yes	27.7764 m (LBP)	1 September 1974	189	

All equipment was sold at auction or other except TUG SPENCE that sank with crew abandoning to the safety of the barge in tow

== Contracts ==
U.S. government contract payments to TransAtlantic Lines over $10,000 from 2001 to 23 January 2011.

Date	Amount	Contract	Vessel	Notes	References
24 September 2001	$2,795,870	DAMT01-98-D-9612 : 0371: P00006	Geysir	Exercise option	
13 February 2002	$5,974,590	DAMT01-02-D-0025 : 0063	Spence		
1 October 2002	$1,841,842	DAMT01-98-D-9612 : 2003	Geysir		
22 October 2002	$34,125	N68836-03-P-0099		Jacksonville, small purchase/rental	
12 March 2003	$7,895,215	DAMT01-02-D-0025 : 0842: P00005	Spence	Jacksonville, Exercise an Option	
1 October 2003	$126,481	DAMT01-03-D-0128 : 1257		97-0300:Procurement Defense-wide	
1 October 2003	$3,484,272	DAMT01-02-D-0025 : 1159	Spence		
10 October 2003	$1,586,151	DAMT01-98-D-9612 : 1211: P00008	Geysir	Change Order	
13 January 2004	$3,934,745	W81GYE-04-D-0022: 0248		Norfolk	
13 January 2004	$-1,384,076	W81GYE-04-D-0022: 1176: P00005		Funding Only Action, Norfolk	
4 March 2004	$6,201,526	DAMT01-02-D-0025 : 0276: P00014	Spence	Norfolk	
1 October 2004	$983,686	W81GYE-04-D-0022 : 0105		Norfolk	
15 October 2004	$3,984,700	N00033-05-C-5500	Baffin Strait	Singapore	
9 December 2004	$-175,700	N00033-05-C-5500: P00001	Baffin Strait	Funding Only Action, Singapore	
10 January 2005	$-250,800	N00033-05-C-5500: P00002	Baffin Strait	Funding Only Action, Singapore	
13 January 2005	$2,951,064	W81GYE-04-D-0022 : 9084: 8		Exercise an Option	
25 January 2005	$4,991,610	DAMT01-02-D-0025 : 0305: 17	Spence	Exercise an Option, Jacksonville	
25 January 2005	$8,127,917	DAMT01-02-D-0025 : 9065: 17	Spence	Change Order, Jacksonville	
25 January 2005	$1,274,286	DAMT01-02-D-0025 : 0305	Spence	Jacksonville	
1 March 2005	$320,805	DAMT01-03-D-0128 : 9070: 7		Exercise an Option	
22 March 2005	$16,000	DAMT01-02-D-0025 : 9050: 18	Spence	Change Order, Jacksonville	
18 May 2005	$764,572	DAMT01-02-D-0025 : 9052: 19	Spence	Change Order, Jacksonville	
7 July 2005	$798,553	DAMT01-02-D-0025 : 9054: 21	Spence	Change Order, Jacksonville	
1 September 2005	$15,000	DAMT01-03-D-0128 : 9848: 10		Change Order	
16 September 2005	$3,186,278	DAMT01-02-D-0025 : 9057: 22	Spence	Change Order, Jacksonville	
1 October 2005	$3,818,250	N00033-05-C-5500: P00003	Baffin Strait	Exercise an Option, Singapore	
31 March 2006	$1,062,093	DAMT01-02-D-0025 : 9001: 25	Spence	Funding action, Jacksonville	
12 May 2006	$1,144,326	DAMT01-02-D-0025 : 9001: 28	Spence	Funding action, Jacksonville	
7 June 2006	$2,300,000	W81GYE-04-D-0022 : 9001: 17		Change Order, Norfolk	
30 June 2006	$4,515,374	W81GYE-06-D-0117 : 9001		Jacksonville	
21 July 2006	$11,843,664	N00033-06-C-5409	TransPacific	Charter hire	
13 October 2006	$4,668,250	N00033-05-C-5500: P00006	Baffin Strait	Funding Only Action	
14 December 2006	$7,309,530	N00033-05-C-5500: P00007	Baffin Strait	Funding Only Action	
27 December 2006	$-4,668,250	N00033-05-C-5500: P00008	Baffin Strait	Funding deobligation	
27 August 2007	$449,000	N00033-07-C-5234		W020: Lease or Rental of Equipment: Lump-sum freight rate, Greece to Israel	
17 October 2007	$1,700,000	N00033-06-C-5409: P00003	TransPacific	FY08 funding to cover cost of exercising option period	
30 October 2007	$5,139,018	N00033-06-C-5409: P00004	TransPacific		
31 October 2007	$180,735	N00033-07-C-5234: P00001		W020: Lump-sum freight rate, Greece to Israel, modification for demurrage	
6 June 2008	$100,000	N00033-06-C-5409: P00005	TransPacific	BUNKERS	
26 August 2008	$1,700,000	N00033-06-C-5409: P00006	TransPacific	Charter hire	
27 September 2007	$3,928,300	N00033-05-C-5500: P00010	Baffin Strait	Option period 3 charter hire	
29 October 2008	$8,839,018	N00033-06-C-5409: P00007	TransPacific	Exercise an Option, Charter hire	
30 October 2008	$3,758,200	N00033-05-C-5500: P00012	Baffin Strait	FY 09 funding	
3 February 2009	$15,078,334	HTC711-09-D-0006	Geysir	includes base year with 2 options	
22 October 2009	$422,000	N00033-05-C-5500: P00014	Baffin Strait	Option period 3 charter hire	
30 October 2009	$6,444,270	N00033-06-C-5409: P00008	TransPacific	Charter hire, option three funding	
18 November 2009	$-5,000	HTC711-09-D-0006 : 0001: 1	Geysir	Minimum contract value already satisfied	
23 November 2009	$50,250	N00033-05-C-5500: P00015	Baffin Strait	Option period 3, charter hire	
23 November 2009	$1,332,000	N00033-10-C-5500	Baffin Strait	Hire for 72 days	
1 December 2009	$144,104	N00033-10-C-5500: P00002	Baffin Strait	Additional funding for fuel	
7 January 2010	$25,969	N00033-05-C-5500: P00016	Baffin Strait	Last hire	
3 March 2010	$229,000	N00033-10-C-5203		Hire	
4 May 2010	$-15,719	N00033-05-C-5500: P00017	Baffin Strait	Option period 3 charter hire	
5 May 2010	$15,719	N00033-05-C-5500: P00018	Baffin Strait	Option period 3 charter hire	
