= Norwegian Air Traffic Control System =

NATCON (Norwegian Air Traffic Control System) is a nationwide Air Traffic Management system which is used by air traffic controllers in control towers (TWR), approach centres (APP) and area control centres (ACC) in Norway. The system is based on Auto Trac Air Traffic Management System from Raytheon (US) which also includes a flight data processing system originally developed by Indra (Spain).

The latest major step forward was taken 22 November 2008 when all units belonging to Bodø AoR were upgraded from a fairly old legacy system (NARDS) to the latest NATCON version. A huge number of people in the Avinor organisation as well as external suppliers have contributed to this project. Avinor's System Development Unit has been in charge of the upgrade and development activities required in order to make the system ready for its deployment at Bodø ACC/APP as well as 35 other TWR and Approach units from mid to northern Norway.
