= Norwegian Ship Register =

Domestic ship register for Norway

The Norwegian Ship Register (Norwegian: Norsk Ordinært Skipsregister, NOR) is a domestic ship register for Norway. It is managed by the Norwegian Maritime Authority and is physically located in Bergen. The registry has about 12,000 ships, which include both commercial and non-commercial vessels. Ships exceeding 15 meters (49 ft) and mobile offshore installations must be registered, which smaller vessels are volunteer. The Norwegian Shipbuilding Register is a subordinate register.

Ship registration in Norway became codified in 1902 and the task was handed over to the district courts and their magistrates and city clerks. At first having about 50 registers, this was reduced to 27 in 1972. The responsibility was centralized and taken over by the Norwegian Ship Registers in 1992. It was merged into the Maritime Authority in 2012.

== History ==
=== Local ship registers ===
A third of the Norwegian Code, signed by Christian V on 15 April 1687, was dedicated to shipping. It established principals for collateral and insurance, as well as arrest and procedure following accidents. However, there were no register for ships established until 1901.

The process to establish a public ship register commenced in 1881. The background was that a bank was being considered which would have as its purpose to lend money to purchase ships. This would require a legal framework which would firmly establish ownership and collateral in ships. The Sea Law Commission was appointed in 1882 to consider this and other legal aspects of the shipping industry. It soon became clear that the commission would have ship registration as its main purpose, as other aspects of sea law had to be coordinated internationally. They reached a conclusion which resulted in an 1888 proposal for Parliament which was based on a single, central register for ships. Parliament decided not to consider the law, and similar proposals in 1892, 1893, 1894 and 1897 were similarly dismissed.

The break-through for the ship registration came in the 1900–01 parliamentary session, when a private, alternative proposal was launched.< The latter instead involved establishing a series of local registers. The Ship Registration Act was approved by Parliament on 4 May 1901. A government commission looked into the detailed aspects of registration and the Council of State approved these on 23 July 1902. This resulted in about fifty district courts being given the task of maintaining local ship registers covering their jurisdiction. They were known by names such as Bergen Ship Register.

The first significant reform came in 1972, when the number of registers was reduced to 27. These were:

Local ship registers
Register	Location	Court	Ports of registry
Ålesund Ship Register	Ålesund	Magistrate in Ålesund	Ålesund
Arendal Ship Register	Arendal	Magistrate in Nedenes	Arendal, Askerøya, Grimstad, Lillesand, Lyngør, Risør, Tvedestrand
Bergen Ship Register	Bergen	City Clerk in Bergen	Bergen, Odda
Bodø Ship Register	Bodø	Magistrate in Bodø	Bodø
Farsund Ship Register	Farsund	Magistrate in Lyngdal	Farsund, Flekkefjord
Fredrikstad Ship Register	Fredrikstad	Fredrikstad District Court	Fredrikstad, Halden, Moss, Sarpsborg
Hammerfest Ship Register	Hammerfest	Magistrate in Hammerfest	Longyearbyen, Tromsø
Harstad Ship Register	Harstad	Magistrate in Trondenes	Hamnvik, Harstad
Haugesund Ship Register	Haugesund	Magistrate in Haugesund	Haugesund, Kopervik, Skudeneshavn
Kristiansand Ship Register	Kristiansand	Kristiansand District Court	Kristiansand, Mandal
Kristiansund Ship Register	Kristiansund	Nordmøre District Court	Kristiansund
Molde Ship Register	Molde	Magistrate in Romsdal	Molde
Namsos Ship Register	Namsos	Magistrate in Namdal	Namsos
Narvik Ship Register	Narvik	Ofoten District Court	Narvik
Nordfjordeid Ship Register	Nordfjordeid	Nordfjord District Court	Måløy
Oslo Ship Register	Oslo	City Clerk in Oslo	Drammen, Drøbak, Hamar, Oslo
Porsgrunn Ship Register	Porsgrunn	Skien and Porsgrunn District Court	Brevik, Kragerø, Langesund, Porsgrunn, Skien
Sandefjord Ship Register	Sandefjord	Magistrate in Sandefjord	Larvik, Sandefjord
Sandnessjøen Ship Register	Sandnessjøen	Magistrate in Alstadhaug	Brønnøysund, Sandnessjøen, Mo i Rana, Mosjøen
Sortland Ship Register	Sortland	Magistrate in Vesterålen	Melbu, Myre, Sigerfjord, Sortland, Stokmarknes
Stavanger Ship Register	Stavanger	Magistrate in Stavanger	Egersund, Sandnes, Stavanger
Sunnfjord Ship Register	Florø	Magistrate in Sunnfjord	Florø
Svolvær Ship Register	Svolvær	Magistrate in Lofoten	Svolvær
Tønsberg Ship Register	Tønsberg	Tønsberg District Court	Holmestrand, Horten, Tønsberg
Tromsø Ship Register	Tromsø	Nord-Troms District Court	Longyearbyen, Tromsø
Trondheim Ship Register	Trondheim	Magistrate in Trondheim	Levanger, Steinkjer, Trondheim
Vardø Ship Register	Vardø	Magistrate in Vardø	Kirkenes, Vadsø, Vardø

=== Centralization ===
The Norwegian International Ship Register (NIS) was created on 1 July 1987. It allowed for a flag of convenience registration for ships in international traffic while remaining under Norwegian flag and jurisdiction. Instead of using the local registers, NIS was established as an office at Bergen Ship Register, part of the City Clerk in Bergen.

NIS took in March 1990 initiative to centralize the local ship registers and jointly locate them with NIS. They emphasized that NIS operated an around-the-clock duty service. A joint location of the registers would allow for economies of scale, cutting costs. It would also allow time to be freed up at the magistrate offices and at the district courts. Another concern was that the recent rationalization program following the introduction of electronic registers had given little savings due to the decentralized nature of the operations.

Parliament looked into the possibility of centralizing the local ship registers in 1990, but the issue was postponed to consider a merger with NIS. The Ministry of Justice established a commission to look into the matter. They concluded in July 1991 that the registers should be centralized and located to Bergen. They proposed that the new register be administratively part of the Maritime Authority. The issue was concluded in March, when the government decided to create the Norwegian Ship Registers. Located in Bergen, it would be organized as a government agency subordinate to the Ministry of Foreign Affairs.

The City Clerk in Bergen was merged with the Magistrate in Bergen from 1 April 1992. NIS was split out of the merged office from 1 May. The responsibility for the local registries was transferred to the new Norwegian Ship Registries from 1 July. At the time there were 12,000 ships registered in NOR and 880 in NIS. The staff at the NIS office was increased from six to eight. No jobs were lost at the magistrate offices and district courts, as these were able to use the workforce for other tasks. The Norwegian Ship Registries became part of the Ministry of Trade and Industry from 1996.

Minister of Trade and Industry Trond Giske took initiative in June 2010 to investigate a merger of the Norwegian Ship Registers and the Norwegian Maritime Authority. An internal ministry committee concluded on 1 November that a merger would be favorable. It cited that a common organization would be more uniform, user-friendly and competitive, allowing shipping companies to relate to a single organization. The handling of the registers would remain in Bergen, despite the Maritime Authority being based in Haugesund. The merger took effect on 1 January 2012. At the time there were eighteen employees in the agency.

== Registration ==
The register is required for certain types of vessels, while other vessels are optional to register. Any Norwegian ship exceeding 15 meters (49 ft) in length as well as oil platforms and other mobile installations are required to be registered if it is not registered in a foreign registry. Volunteer registration is available for ships between 7 and 15 meters (23 and 49 ft), certain fishing vessels, boats of any length used commercially, mobile cranes, hovercraft, docks and drags, and fixed maritime installations not used for petroleum extraction.

NOR-registered ships must be of Norwegian nationality or of a nationality from the European Economic Area. Ownership does not need to be a Norwegian entity, although operations must be Norwegian and the owner have a Norwegian representative.

Ships under construction in Norway may be registered in the Norwegian Shipbuilding Register.

NOR is open to registration for recreational vessels. This allows the owner to use the boat for collateral for a loan. NOR-registered boat can also be registered in the volunteer Boat Register. Recreational boats are sometimes sold without a proper reregistration, other times purchasers have bought boats without checking to see if the boat has a collateral tied to it.
