= Norwegian International Ship Register =

Norwegian International Ship Register or NIS is a separate Norwegian ship register for Norwegian vessels aimed at competing with flags of convenience registers such as Panama and Liberia. Originally proposed by Erling Dekke Næss in 1984, it was established in Bergen in 1987 and is managed by the Norwegian Ship Registers. In 2010, it was the 12th ship register by gross tonnage, representing 1% of the global tonnage.

== Objectives ==
In the years before the register was established, the Norwegian register lost out as it could not compete with lower-cost registers. The main objectives of establishing the register were:

- Maintain the shipping industry under the Norwegian flag.
- Provide better competitive conditions for the Norwegian merchant fleet in worldwide trade.
- Initiate registration requirements in accordance with Norway's obligations under international agreements, (especially United Nations (UN), International Maritime Organization (IMO) and International Labour Organization (ILO)).
- Maintain a Norwegian fleet that could give greater employment opportunities to Norwegian seaman than a foreign-flagged fleet.
- Restrict the types of vessel that may be registered.
- Limit the trading areas allowed. NIS vessels cannot trade cargo between Norwegian ports or carry passengers on a regular basis to or from Norwegian ports.

The register has been highly successful and in 2002 there were 880 vessels in the register with a total of around 21.2 million gross tonnage (GT) (39 million tonnes deadweight (DWT)).

== Criticism ==
There has been some criticism of countries that have opened second registers, such as Norway (NIS), Germany (GIS) and Denmark (DIS), because there are fewer restrictions on the nationality of the crew and allegedly lower safety standards than the main national register.

== See also ==
- Flag of convenience
- Flag state
