= Bokn =

Bokn may refer to:

== Places ==
- Bokn Municipality, a municipality in Rogaland county, Norway
- Bokn, or Føresvik, a village in Bokn Municipality in Rogaland county, Norway
- Bokn Church, a church in Bokn Municipality in Rogaland county, Norway
- Vestre Bokn, an island in Bokn Municipality in Rogaland county, Norway
