= Stavanger District Court =

Former district court in Norway

- Stavanger tingrett
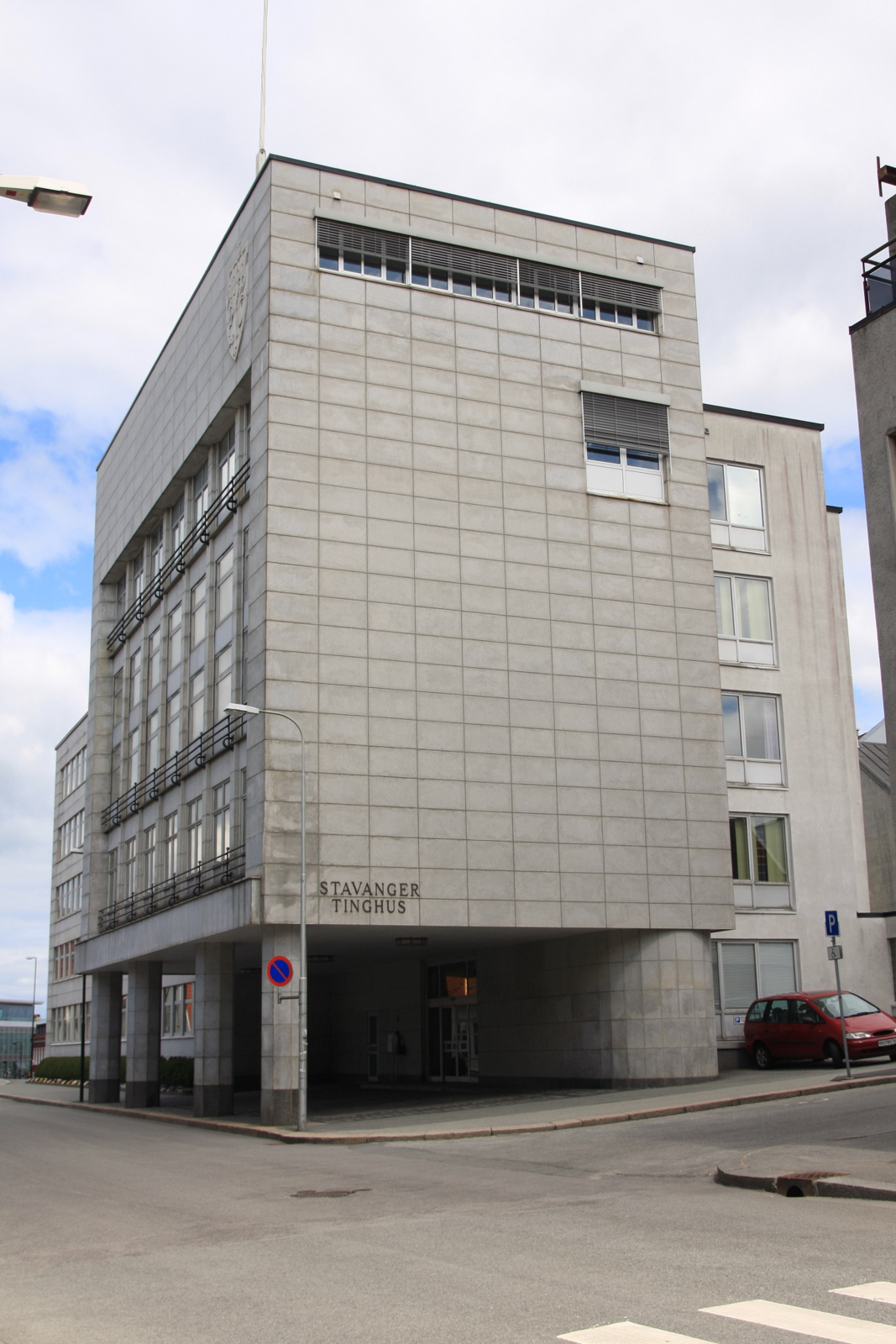
- The Courthouse in Stavanger
- 58.969349°N 5.736468°E
- Established: 1 Jan 1920
- Dissolved: 26 April 2021
- Jurisdiction: Central Rogaland
- Location: Stavanger, Norway
- Coordinates: 58.969349°N 5.736468°E
- Appeals to: Gulating Court of Appeal

Stavanger District Court (Norwegian: Stavanger tingrett) was a district court in Rogaland county, Norway. The court was based in the city of Stavanger. The court existed until 2021. It had jurisdiction over the central part of the county which included the municipalities of Hjelmeland, Kvitsøy, Randaberg, Sola, Stavanger, and Strand. Cases from this court could be appealed to Gulating Court of Appeal. The court was led by the chief judge (Sorenskriver) Tor Christian Carlsen. This court employed a chief judge, 18 other judges, and 24 prosecutors.

The court was a court of first instance. Its judicial duties were mainly to settle criminal cases and to resolve civil litigation as well as bankruptcy. The administration and registration tasks of the court included death registration, issuing certain certificates, performing duties of a notary public, and officiating civil wedding ceremonies. Cases from this court were heard by a combination of professional judges and lay judges.

== History ==
This court was established on 1 January 1920 to serve the city of Stavanger. On 1 July 2007, the old Ryfylke District Court was dissolved and most of its jurisdiction was transferred to the Stavanger District Court (except for Sandnes and Forsand municipalities which were transferred to Jæren District Court and Sauda and Suldal municipalities were transferred to Karmsund District Court). Also on that date, Sola Municipality was transferred out of Jæren District Court into the Stavanger District Court. On 26 April 2021, Stavanger District Court was merged with the Jæren District Court and Dalane District Court to create the new Sør-Rogaland District Court.
