= Haugaland District Court =

Former district court in Norway

- Haugaland tingrett
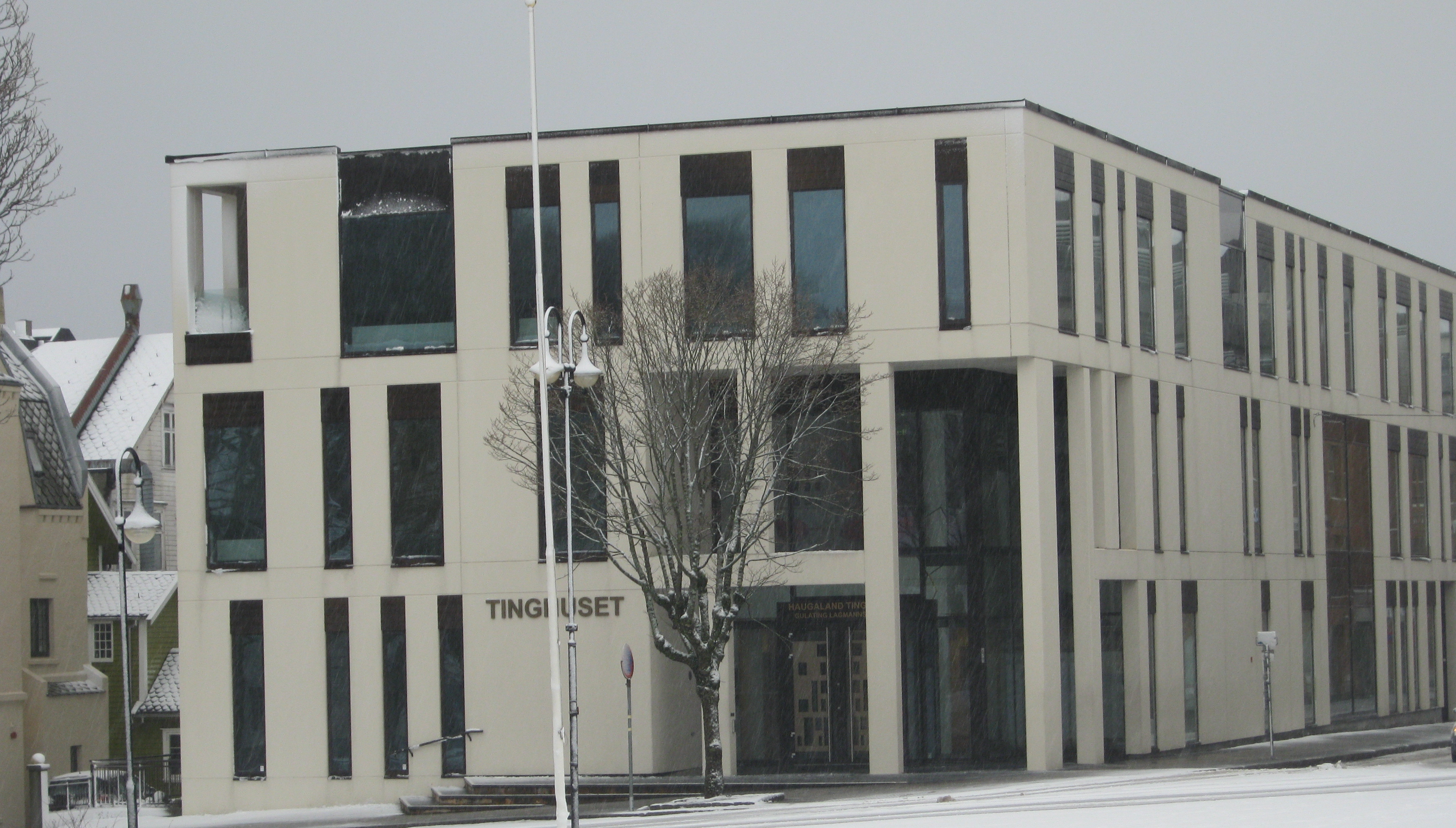
- The new Haugesund Courthouse, the current location of Haugaland District Court
- Interactive map of Haugaland District Court
- 59.410038°N 5.273882°E
- Established: 1 April 2008
- Dissolved: 26 April 2021
- Jurisdiction: Haugaland
- Location: Haugesund, Norway
- Coordinates: 59.410038°N 5.273882°E
- Appeals to: Gulating Court of Appeal

Haugaland District Court (Norwegian: Haugaland tingrett) was a district court in Rogaland and Vestland counties in Norway. The court was based in the town of Haugesund. The court existed from 2008 until 2021. It had jurisdiction over the northern part of Rogaland county (the municipalities of Bokn, Haugesund, Karmøy, Sauda, Suldal, Tysvær, Utsira, and Vindafjord) plus Etne Municipality in the far southern part of Vestland county. Cases from this court could be appealed to Gulating Court of Appeal. The court was led by the chief judge (Sorenskriver) Tine Margrethe Odland. This court employed a chief judge, six other judges, and nine prosecutors.

The court was a court of first instance. Its judicial duties were mainly to settle criminal cases and to resolve civil litigation as well as bankruptcy. The administration and registration tasks of the court included death registration, issuing certain certificates, performing duties of a notary public, and officiating civil wedding ceremonies. Cases from this court were heard by a combination of professional judges and lay judges.

== History ==
The Court was established on 1 April 2008 when the old Haugesund District Court and Karmsund District Courts were merged. A new courthouse in Haugesund was constructed for the new court. On 26 April 2021, Haugaland District Court was merged with the Sunnhordland District Court to create the new Haugaland og Sunnhordland District Court.
