= Sandnes District Court =

Former district court in Norway

- Sandnes tingrett
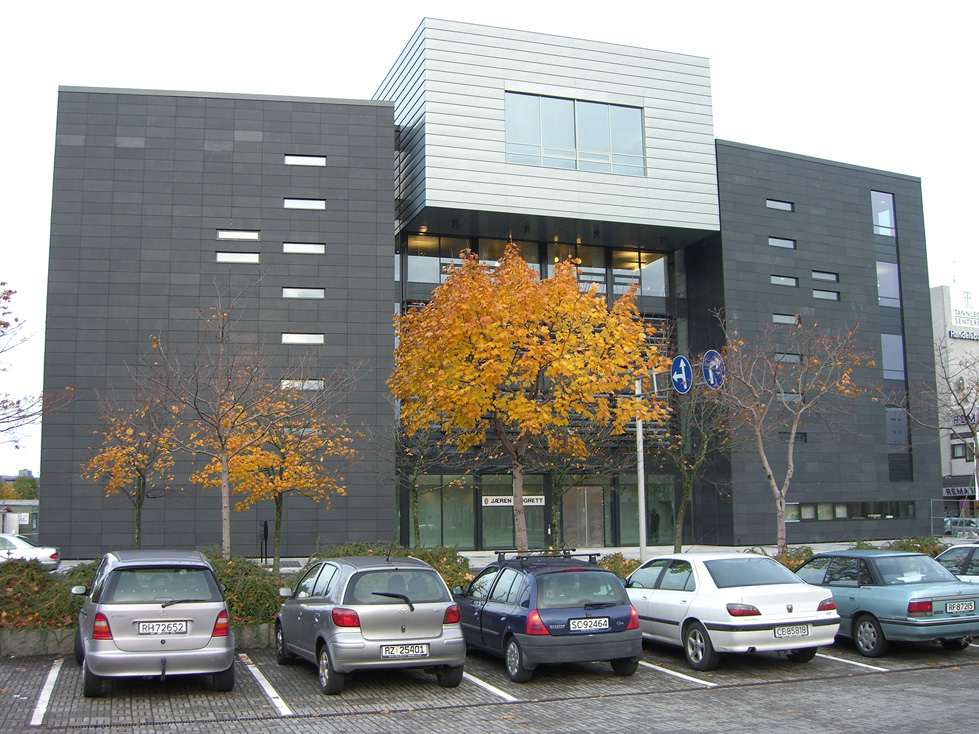
- Sandnes Courthouse
- 58.85326°N 5.739018°E
- Established: 24 February 1967
- Dissolved: 1 January 2006
- Jurisdiction: Central Rogaland
- Location: Sandnes, Norway
- Coordinates: 58.85326°N 5.739018°E
- Appeals to: Gulating Court of Appeal

Sandnes District Court (Norwegian: Sandnes tingrett) was a district court in Rogaland county, Norway. The court was based at the Sandnes Courthouse located on Olav V's plass in the town of Sandnes. The court existed from 1967 until 2006. It had jurisdiction over Gjesdal Municipality and Sandnes Municipality. Cases from this court could be appealed to Gulating Court of Appeal.

The court was a court of first instance. Its judicial duties were mainly to settle criminal cases and to resolve civil litigation as well as bankruptcy. The administration and registration tasks of the court included death registration, issuing certain certificates, performing duties of a notary public, and officiating civil wedding ceremonies. Cases from this court were heard by a combination of professional judges and lay judges.

== History ==
This court was established on 24 February 1967, when parts of the Jæren District Court and Ryfylke District Court were used to create this new court. Initially, the court's geographical jurisdiction came from the municipalities of Høyland, Sandnes, and Hetland (which came from the Jæren District Court) and Høle and Gjesdal (which came from the Ryfylke District Court). On 1 September 2006, a major change to the district courts in the region took place. The Sandnes District Court was closed and merged into the Jæren District Court which moved the site of the court from Bryne in Time Municipality to the town of Sandnes. Additionally on that date, the old Ryfylke District Court was also dissolved and Forsand Municipality was transferred into the jurisdiction of the Jæren District Court.
