= Asbjørn Kloster =

Norwegian educator (1823–1876)

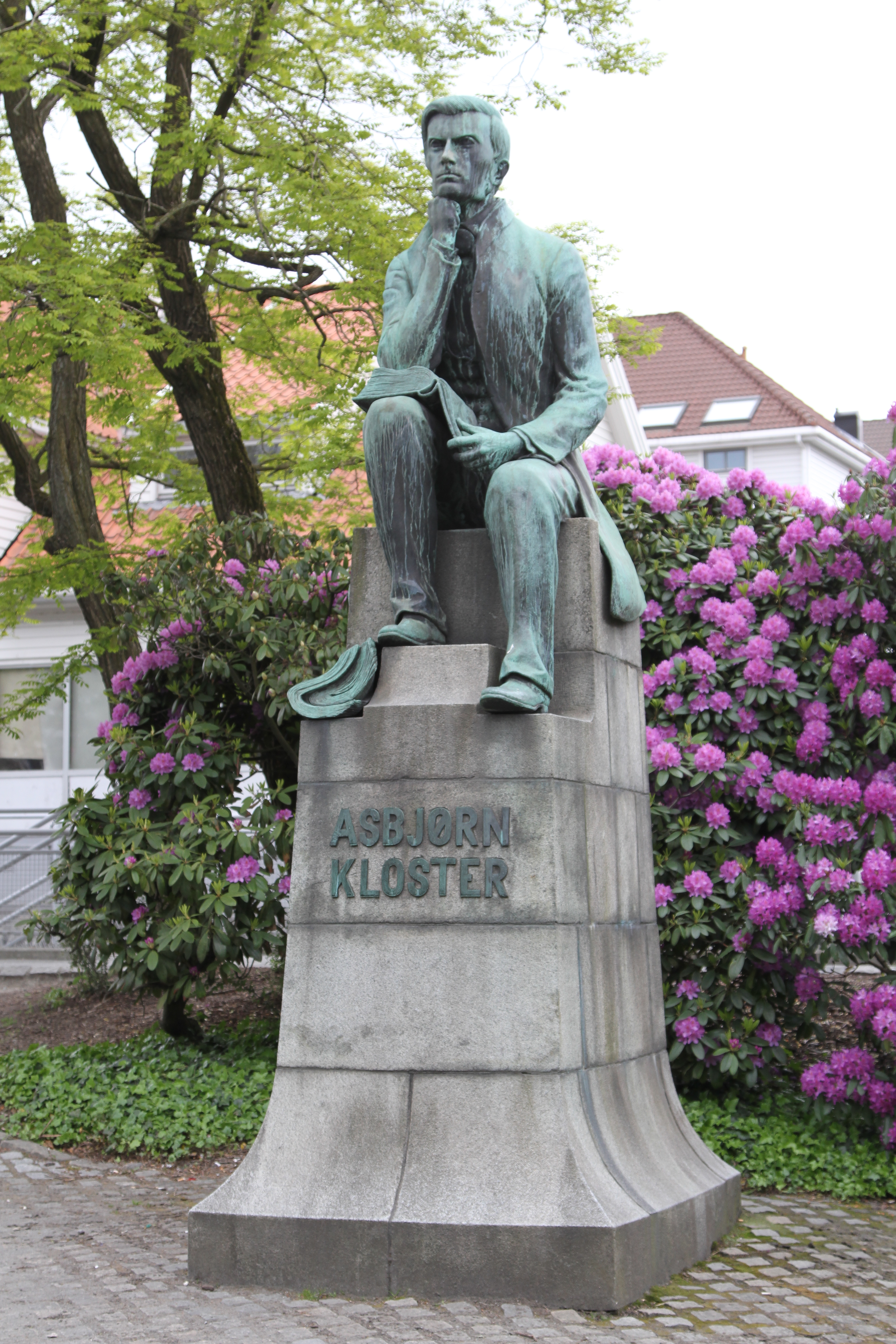
Statue of Asbjørn Kloster in Stavanger

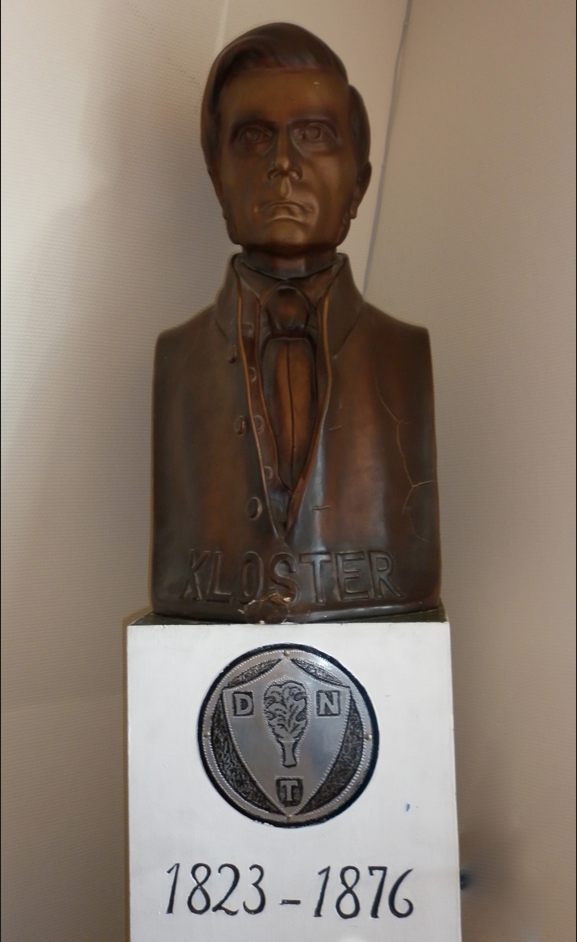
Bust of Asbjørn Kloster Totalen in Stavanger

Asbjørn Kloster (21 December 1823 – 18 January 1876) was a Norwegian educator, social reformer and leader of the Norwegian temperance movement in the 19th century.

== Background ==
Asbjørn Olsen Kloster was born on the island of Vestre Bokn in the parish of Bokn in Stavangers Amt (county) in Norway. His ancestors were farmers on the islands in the Boknafjord. He grew up on the Boknaberg farm. His parents were farmer (and later merchant) Ole Endresen (1795–1883) and Martha Asbjørnsdatter Kloster (1800–1880). At eight years of age, he was sent to live with an aunt on the farm Vik at Rennesøy. He was married to Marie Elisabeth Knudsen from 1861.

== Career ==
After his confirmation, Kloster moved to Stavanger, where his parents had relocated. Kloster worked as a salesman, first at his father's shop and later for others. During the period from 1842 to 1845, Kloster came in contact with the Religious Society of Friends movement in Stavanger. The Quaker Movement had first gained a foothold in parts of Rogaland, Norway, with sailors who had served as British prisoners of war during the Napoleonic Wars. In 1846 Kloster was recruited for a year studying in England, by English Quakers who visited the city. He subsequently translated Quaker literature and followed the English-speaking Quakers as an interpreter on their travels to Norway, Denmark, Iceland and the Faroe Islands.

For thirteen years, from 1848, Kloster operated a Quaker school (Kvekerskolen) in Stavanger. During the 1850s, Kvekerskolen became the largest private school in Stavanger, with up to 100 students. Kloster wrote several textbooks himself, including a catechism, a reader and English textbooks.

Kloster played an active role both as a minister, teacher and as a publisher. In 1859, Kloster founded the first tee-totaller society in Norway, (in Norwegian: Stavanger yngre Afholdenheds-Forening), in Stavanger. The founding meeting was held at Kloster's initiative on 29 December 1859, with about 120 participants, and 30 persons signed up for membership in the new society. The society was soon renamed Stavanger Totalavholdsforening. The following year he began to publish the Norwegian-language temperance magazine Afholdsblad mod Brugen af alle Slags berusende Drikke uden som Medicin, also called Afholdsbladet (in 1861 renamed to Menneskevennen meaning 'Friend of Man'), which he published monthly until his death 15 years later.

Kloster moved to Christiania in 1861, where he also founded a temperance society. He moved back to Stavanger in 1863. The nationwide society Det Norske Totalafholdsselskab (DNT) was founded by Kloster in 1875. At the time of Kloster's death in 1876, DNT had a total of 7,000 members, distributed among 40 local chapters. The Stavanger chapter had around 1,600 members.

Kloster also operated an import business which specialized in the sale of glass, stoneware and porcelain which he imported from England.

== Honors ==
A statue of Kloster was raised in Stavanger in 1912. A Norwegian postage stamp was issued in his honor in 1959. A street in the Storhaug borough of Stavanger was named after him in 1903. He is buried at Kvekergravlunden, the Quaker cemetery, in Stavanger.

== Other sources ==
- Fuglum, Per Asbjørn Kloster, pedagog, forkynner og avholdspioner (Lunde, 2004) ISBN 82-520-4737-8
- Nag, Martin Nytt lys over Asbjørn Kloster og hans nærmiljø i Stavanger, Ryfylke og Christiania (Kvekerforlaget, 1986) ISBN 82-90311-42-7
- Nag, Martin Asbjørn Kloster - folkebevegelser og alkohol (Rusmiddeldirektoratet, 1989)
