= Karmsund District Court =

Former district court in Norway

- Karmsund tingrett
- Interactive map of Karmsund District Court
- 59.410038°N 5.273882°E
- Established: 20 Oct 1797
- Dissolved: 1 April 2008
- Jurisdiction: Northern Rogaland
- Location: Haugesund, Norway
- Coordinates: 59.410038°N 5.273882°E
- Appeals to: Gulating Court of Appeal

Karmsund District Court (Norwegian: Karmsund tingrett) was a district court in Rogaland county, Norway. The court was based in the town of Haugesund. The court existed from 1797 until 2008. It had jurisdiction over the municipalities of Karmøy, Utsira, Bokn, Vindafjord, Tysvær, Sauda, and Suldal. Cases from this court could be appealed to Gulating Court of Appeal.

The court was a court of first instance. Its judicial duties were mainly to settle criminal cases and to resolve civil litigation as well as bankruptcy. The administration and registration tasks of the court included death registration, issuing certain certificates, performing duties of a notary public, and officiating civil wedding ceremonies. Cases from this court were heard by a combination of professional judges and lay judges.

== History ==
This court was established on 20 October 1797 when it was split off from the Ryfylke District Court. On 1 January 1867, the town of Haugesund received its own court (Haugesund District Court) which was split off from this court. On 1 July 2007, Sauda Municipality and Suldal Municipality were transferred to this court when the old Ryfylke District Court was closed. On 1 April 2008, this court was merged with the Haugesund District Court to form the new Haugaland District Court.
