= Haugesund District Court =

Former district court in Norway

- Haugesund tingrett
- 59.410038°N 5.273882°E
- Established: 1 Jan 1867
- Dissolved: 1 April 2008
- Jurisdiction: Northern Rogaland
- Location: Haugesund, Norway
- Coordinates: 59.410038°N 5.273882°E
- Appeals to: Gulating Court of Appeal

Haugesund District Court (Norwegian: Haugesund tingrett) was a district court in Rogaland county, Norway. The court was based in the town of Haugesund. The court existed from 1867 until 2008. It had jurisdiction over Haugesund Municipality. Cases from this court could be appealed to Gulating Court of Appeal.

The court was a court of first instance. Its judicial duties were mainly to settle criminal cases and to resolve civil litigation as well as bankruptcy. The administration and registration tasks of the court included death registration, issuing certain certificates, performing duties of a notary public, and officiating civil wedding ceremonies. Cases from this court were heard by a combination of professional judges and lay judges.

== History ==
This court was established on 1 January 1867 when it was split off from the Karmsund District Court. On 1 April 2008, this court was merged with the Karmsund District Court to form the new Haugaland District Court.
