= Sunnhordland District Court =

Former district court in Norway

- Sunnhordland tingrett
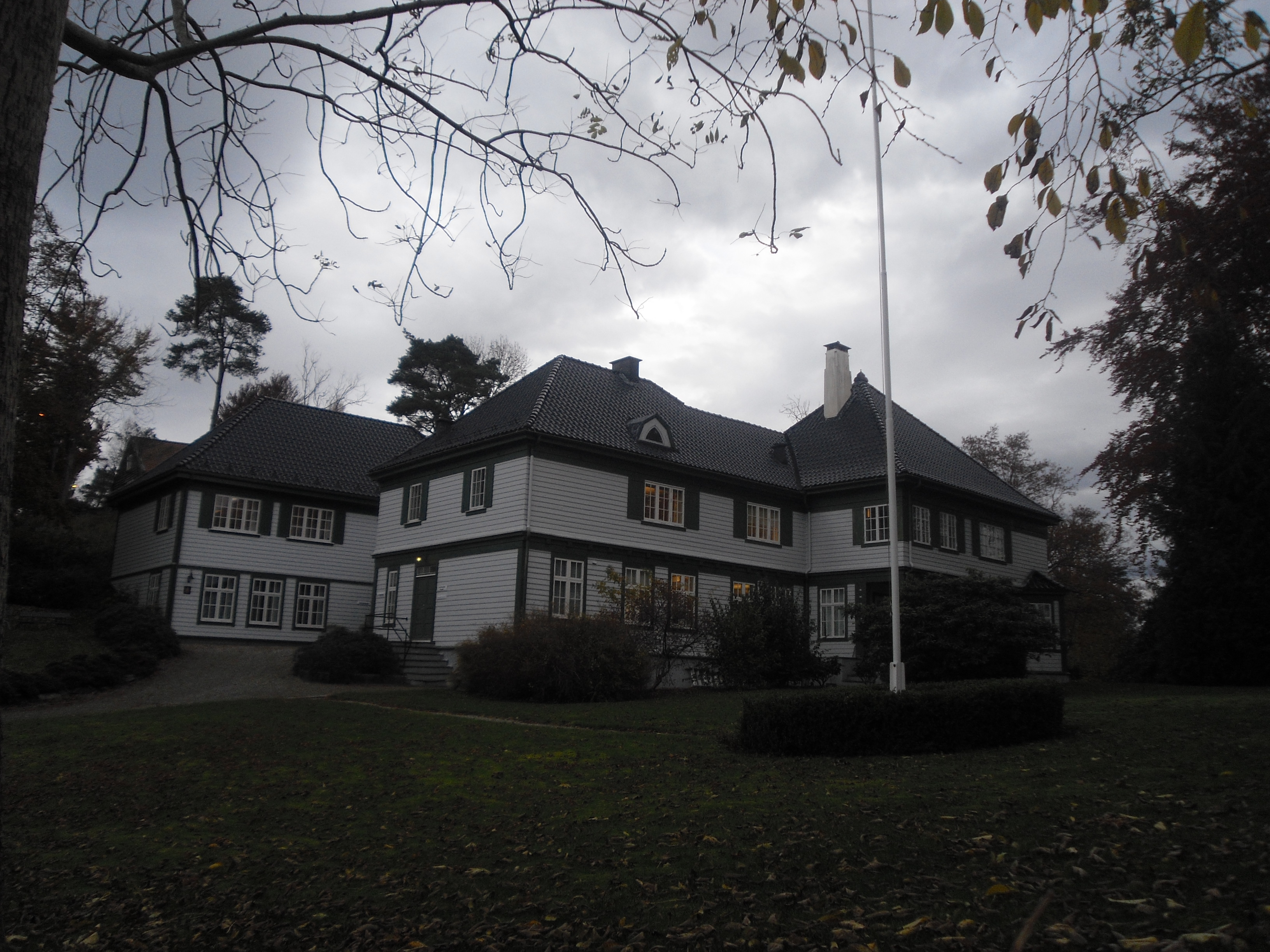
- Courthouse in Leirvik
- 59.783031°N 5.5012822°E
- Established: 1591
- Dissolved: 26 April 2021
- Jurisdiction: Sunnhordland
- Location: Leirvik, Norway
- Coordinates: 59.783031°N 5.5012822°E
- Appeals to: Gulating Court of Appeal

Sunnhordland District Court (Norwegian: Sunnhordland tingrett) was a district court in Vestland county, Norway. The court was based in the town of Leirvik in Stord Municipality. The court existed from 1591 until 2021. It had jurisdiction over Sunnhordland which included the municipalities of Bømlo, Fitjar, Kvinnherad, Stord, Sveio, and Tysnes. Cases from this court could be appealed to Gulating Court of Appeal.

The court was a court of first instance. Its judicial duties were mainly to settle criminal cases and to resolve civil litigation as well as bankruptcy. The administration and registration tasks of the court included death registration, issuing certain certificates, performing duties of a notary public, and officiating civil wedding ceremonies. Cases from this court were heard by a combination of professional judges and lay judges.

== History ==
The court was created in 1591 when district courts were established across Norway. On 26 April 2021, Sunnhordland District Court was merged with the Haugaland District Court to create the new Haugaland og Sunnhordland District Court.
