= Dalane District Court =

Former district court in Rogaland, Norway

- Dalane tingrett
- 58.451385°N 6.0001087°E
- Established: 1869
- Dissolved: 26 April 2021
- Jurisdiction: Dalane
- Location: Egersund, Norway
- Coordinates: 58.451385°N 6.0001087°E
- Appeals to: Gulating Court of Appeal

Dalane District Court (Norwegian: Dalane tingrett) was a district court in Agder and Rogaland counties in Norway. The court was based in the town of Egersund. The court existed until 2021. It had jurisdiction over the southern part of Rogaland county which included the municipalities of Eigersund, Bjerkreim, Lund, and Sokndal plus it also includes the neighboring Sirdal Municipality in Agder county. Cases from this court could be appealed to Gulating Court of Appeal. The court was led by the chief judge (Sorenskriver) Alexander Schønemann. This court employed a chief judge, one other judge, and three prosecutors.

The court was a court of first instance. Its judicial duties were mainly to settle criminal cases and to resolve civil litigation as well as bankruptcy. The administration and registration tasks of the court included death registration, issuing certain certificates, performing duties of a notary public, and officiating civil wedding ceremonies. Cases from this court were heard by a combination of professional judges and lay judges.

== History ==
This court was established in 1869 when the old Jæren og Dalane District Court was divided into two: Dalane District Court (in the south) and Jæren District Court in the north. Initially, this court had jurisdiction over Sokndal, Lund, Heskestad, Helleland, Bjerkreim, Eigersund, and Ogna. In 1965, jurisdiction over Ogna Municipality was transferred to the Jæren District Court. On 26 April 2021, Dalane District Court was merged with the Jæren District Court and Stavanger District Court to create the new Sør-Rogaland District Court.
