= Jæren District Court =

Former district court in Norway

- Jæren tingrett
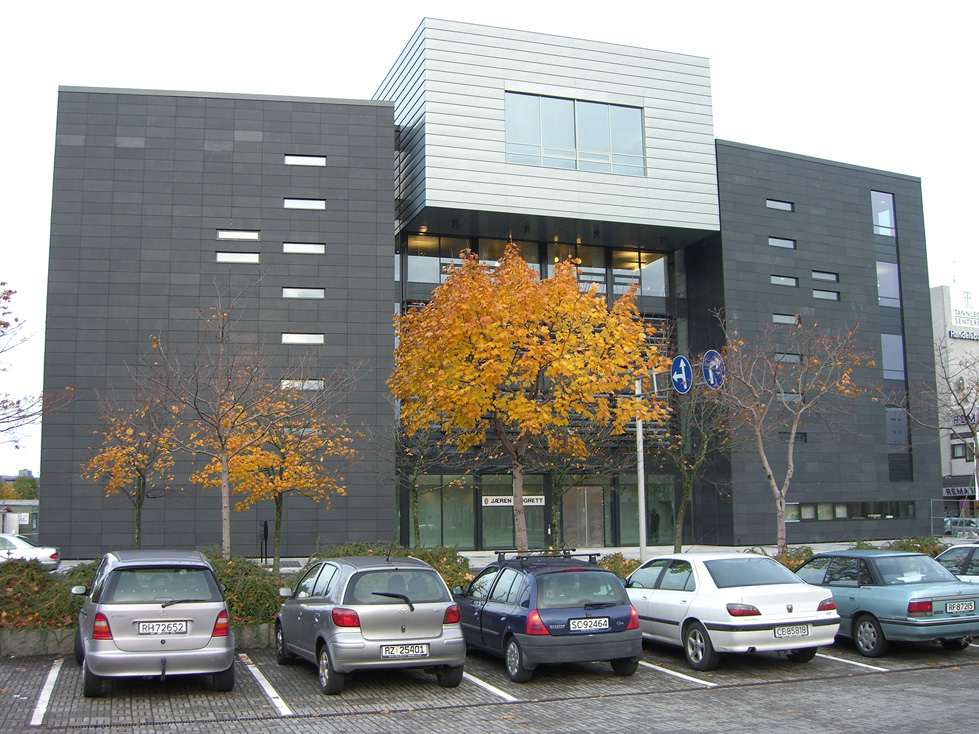
- Sandnes Courthouse, where Jæren District Court is located
- 58.85326°N 5.739018°E
- Established: 1869
- Dissolved: 26 April 2021
- Jurisdiction: Jæren
- Location: Sandnes, Norway
- Coordinates: 58.85326°N 5.739018°E
- Appeals to: Gulating Court of Appeal

Jæren District Court (Norwegian: Jæren tingrett) was a district court in Rogaland county, Norway. The court was based at the Sandnes Courthouse located on Olav V's plass in the town of Sandnes. The court existed until 2021. It had jurisdiction over the west central part of the county which included the municipalities of Gjesdal, Hå, Klepp, Sandnes, and Time. Cases from this court could be appealed to Gulating Court of Appeal. The court was led by the chief judge (Sorenskriver) Anne Marie Aarrestad. This court employed a chief judge, ten other judges, and five prosecutors as well as other administrative assistants. Jæren District Court had seven courtrooms.

The court was a court of first instance. Its judicial duties were mainly to settle criminal cases and to resolve civil litigation as well as bankruptcy. The administration and registration tasks of the court included death registration, issuing certain certificates, performing duties of a notary public, and officiating civil wedding ceremonies. Cases from this court were heard by a combination of professional judges and lay judges.

== History ==
This court was established in 1869 when the old Jæren og Dalane District Court was divided into two: Dalane District Court (in the south) and Jæren District Court in the north. Initially, this court had jurisdiction over Hetland, Håland, Høyland, Klepp, Hå, and Time. In 1951, the northern part of the court's jurisdictional area was separated and moved to the newly created Hafrsfjord District Court. On 24 February 1967, part of this court's geographical jurisdiction was separated to form part of the new Sandnes District Court and at the same time, Sola Municipality was transferred back into the jurisdiction of this court (from Hafrsfjord District Court which had been closed down). This meant that this court's jurisdiction only covered the municipalities of Hå, Klepp, Time, and Sola. On 1 September 2006, a major change to the district courts in the region took place. The Sandnes District Court was closed and merged into the Jæren District Court which moved the site of the court from Bryne in Time Municipality to the town of Sandnes. Additionally on that date, the old Ryfylke District Court was also dissolved and Forsand Municipality was transferred into the jurisdiction of the Jæren District Court. On 1 July 2007, Sola Municipality was transferred out of this court's jurisdiction and assigned to the Stavanger District Court. On 26 April 2021, Jæren District Court was merged with the Dalane District Court and Stavanger District Court to create the new Sør-Rogaland District Court.
