= Haugaland and Sunnhordland District Court =

First-instance law court in Norway

- Haugaland og Sunnhordland tingrett
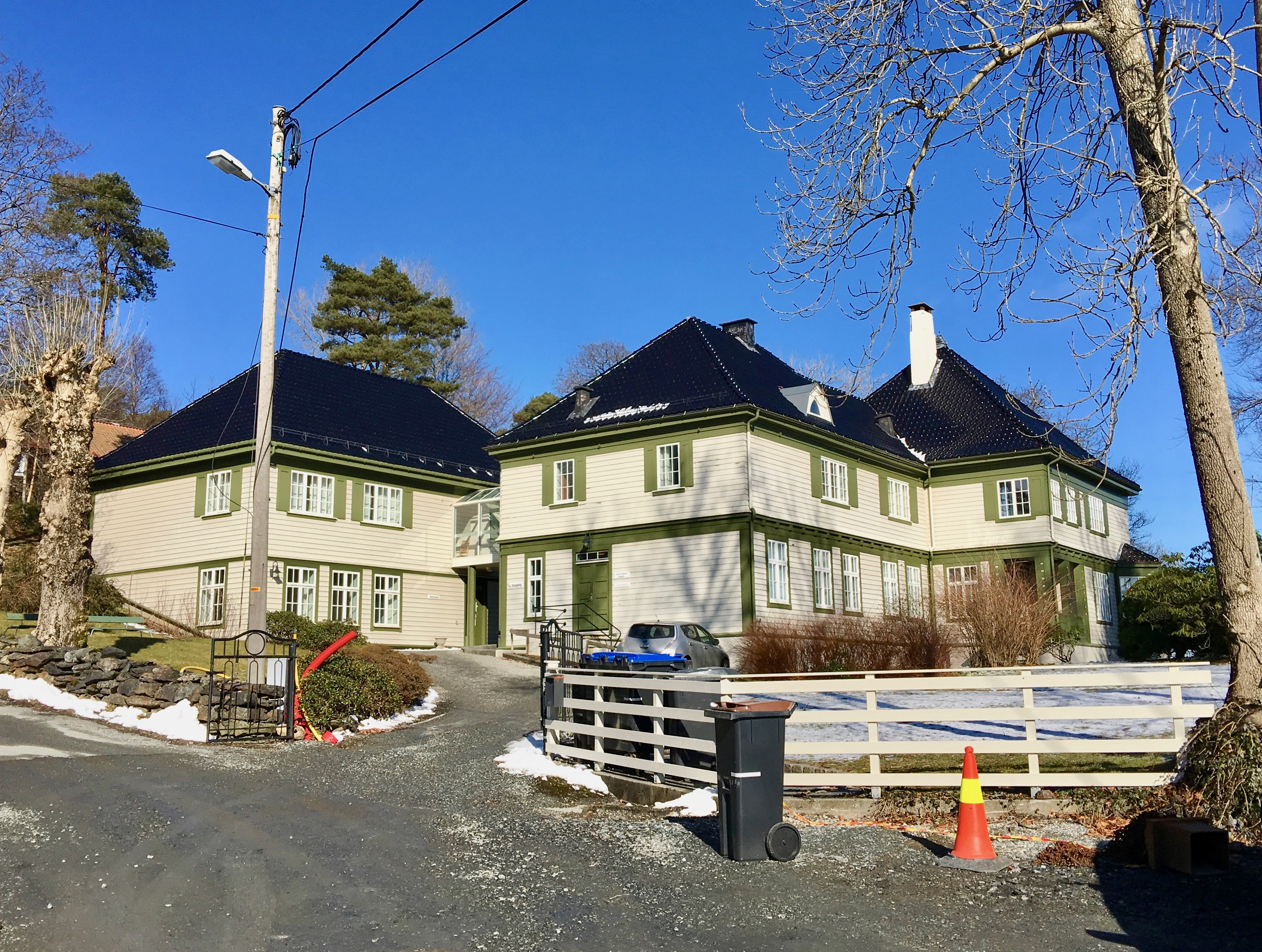
- Courthouse in Leirvik
- Interactive map of Haugaland and Sunnhordland; District Court
- 59°46′59″N 5°30′05″E
- Established: 26 April 2021
- Jurisdiction: Sunnhordland and Haugaland, Norway
- Location: Haugesund and Leirvik
- Coordinates: 59°46′59″N 5°30′05″E
- Appeals to: Gulating Court of Appeal
- Website: Official website

Haugaland and Sunnhordland District Court (Norwegian: Haugaland og Sunnhordland tingrett) is a district court located in Vestland and Rogaland counties in Norway. This court is based at two different courthouses which are located in Haugesund and Leirvik. The court is subordinate to the Gulating Court of Appeal. The court serves the southern part of Vestland county and the northern part of Rogaland county including the following 17 municipalities:

- The courthouse in Haugesund accepts cases from the municipalities of Bokn, Etne, Haugesund, Karmøy, Sauda, Suldal, Tysvær, Utsira, and Vindafjord.
- The courthouse in Leirvik accepts cases from the municipalities of Bømlo, Fitjar, Kinnherad, Stord, Sveio, and Tysnes.

The court is led by a chief judge (sorenskriver) and several other judges. The court is a court of first instance. Its judicial duties are mainly to settle criminal cases and to resolve civil litigation as well as bankruptcy. The administration and registration tasks of the court include death registration, issuing certain certificates, performing duties of a notary public, and officiating civil wedding ceremonies. Cases from this court are heard by a combination of professional judges and lay judges.

== History ==
This court was established on 26 April 2021 after the old Haugaland District Court and Sunnhordland District Court were merged into one court. The new district court system continues to use the courthouses from the predecessor courts.
