= Føresvik =

Village in Bokn Municipality, Norway

Føresvik Vigjå / Bokn
- Village
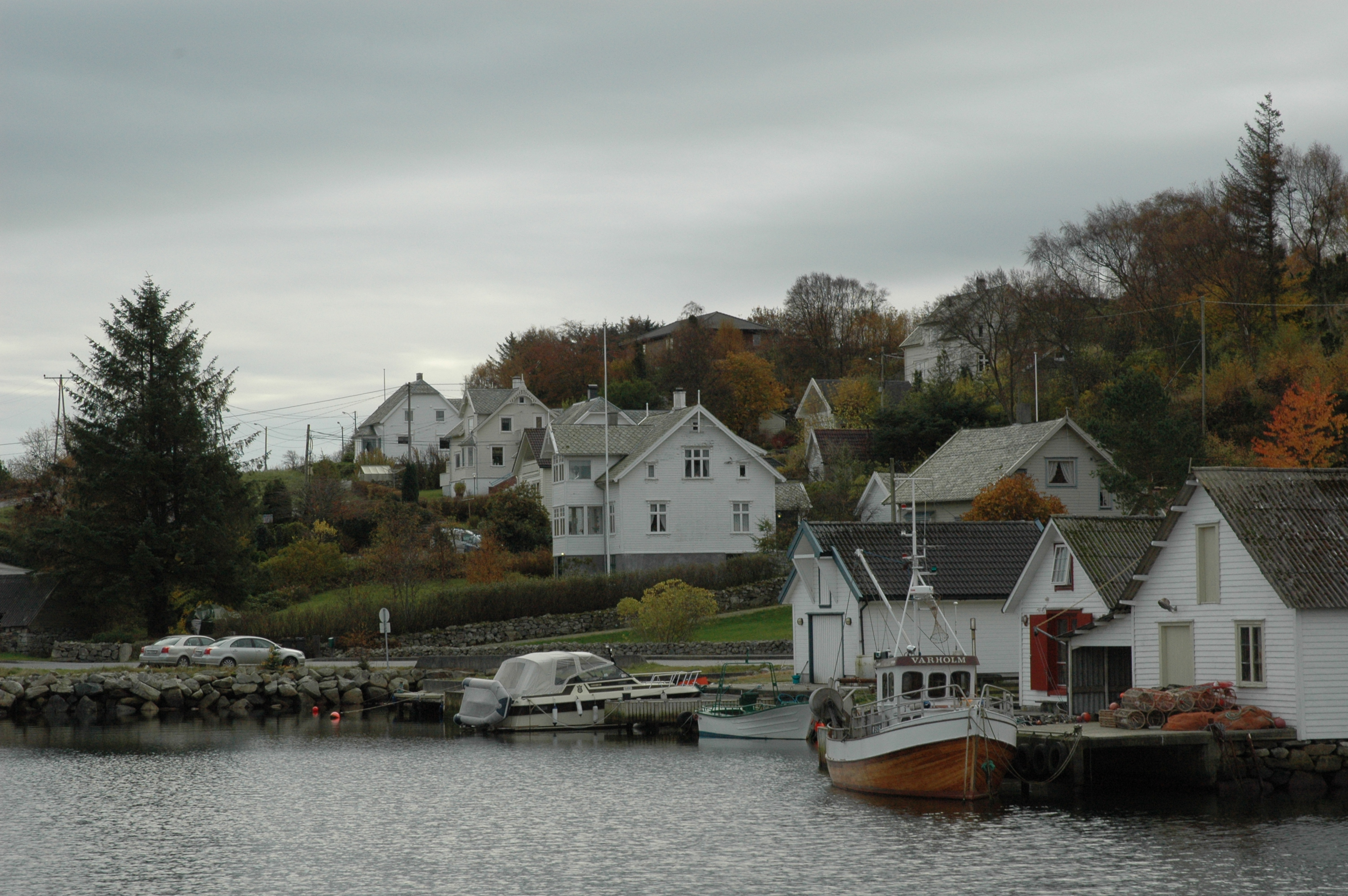
- View of the village
- Interactive map of Føresvik
- Coordinates: 59.22997°N 5.43711°E
- Country: Norway
- Region: Western Norway
- County: Rogaland
- District: Haugaland
- Municipality: Bokn Municipality

Area
  - Total: 0.32 km^{2} (0.12 sq mi)
- Elevation: 29 m (95 ft)

Population (2025)
  - Total: 304
  - Density: 950/km^{2} (2,500/sq mi)
- Time zone: UTC+01:00 (CET)
  - Summer (DST): UTC+02:00 (CEST)
- Post Code: 5561 Bokn

Føresvik (sometimes called Bokn) is the administrative centre of Bokn Municipality in Rogaland county, Norway. The village is located on the northeastern shore of the island of Vestre Bokn, along the rather narrow Boknasundet strait which separates Vestre Bokn from the island of Austre Bokn. The European route E39 highway runs through the village and the bridge connecting Vestre Bokn to Austre Bokn (and ultimately to the mainland) is also located in Føresvik.

The village is the main urban area for the whole municipality, and it includes the local government offices, school, commercial centre, and Bokn Church. The 0.32-square-kilometre (79-acre) village has a population (2025) of 304, giving the village a population density of 950 inhabitants per square kilometre (2,500/sq mi). The village is referred to as the village of Bokn by Statistics Norway.
