= Ryfylke District Court =

Former district court in Norway

- Ryfylke tingrett
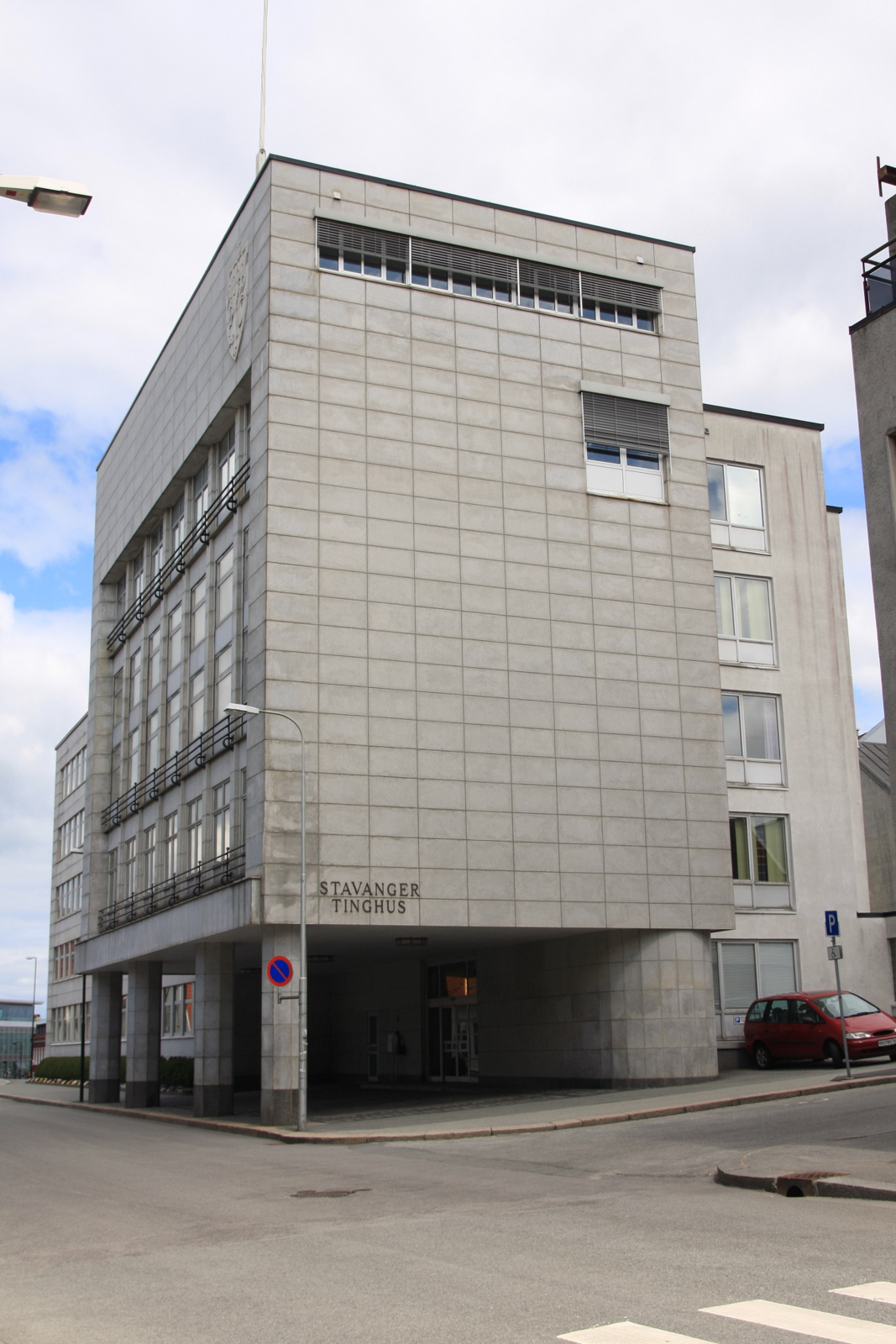
- The Courthouse in Stavanger
- 58.969349°N 5.736468°E
- Established: 1591
- Dissolved: 1 July 2007
- Jurisdiction: Central Rogaland
- Location: Stavanger, Norway
- Coordinates: 58.969349°N 5.736468°E
- Appeals to: Gulating Court of Appeal

Ryfylke District Court (Norwegian: Ryfylke tingrett) was a district court in Rogaland county, Norway. The court was based in the city of Stavanger. The court existed from 1591 until 2007. It had jurisdiction over the Ryfylke area of the county which included the municipalities of Finnøy, Forsand, Hjelmeland, Kvitsøy, Randaberg, Rennesøy, Sauda, Strand, and Suldal. Cases from this court could be appealed to Gulating Court of Appeal.

The court was a court of first instance. Its judicial duties were mainly to settle criminal cases and to resolve civil litigation as well as bankruptcy. The administration and registration tasks of the court included death registration, issuing certain certificates, performing duties of a notary public, and officiating civil wedding ceremonies. Cases from this court were heard by a combination of professional judges and lay judges.

== History ==
This court was established in 1591 when district courts were first implemented in Norway. On 1 July 2007, this court was dissolved and most of its jurisdiction was transferred to the Stavanger District Court except for Sandnes Municipality and Forsand Municipality which were transferred to Jæren District Court and Sauda Municipality and Suldal Municipality which were transferred to the Karmsund District Court.
