= Ognøya =

Island in Rogaland, Norway

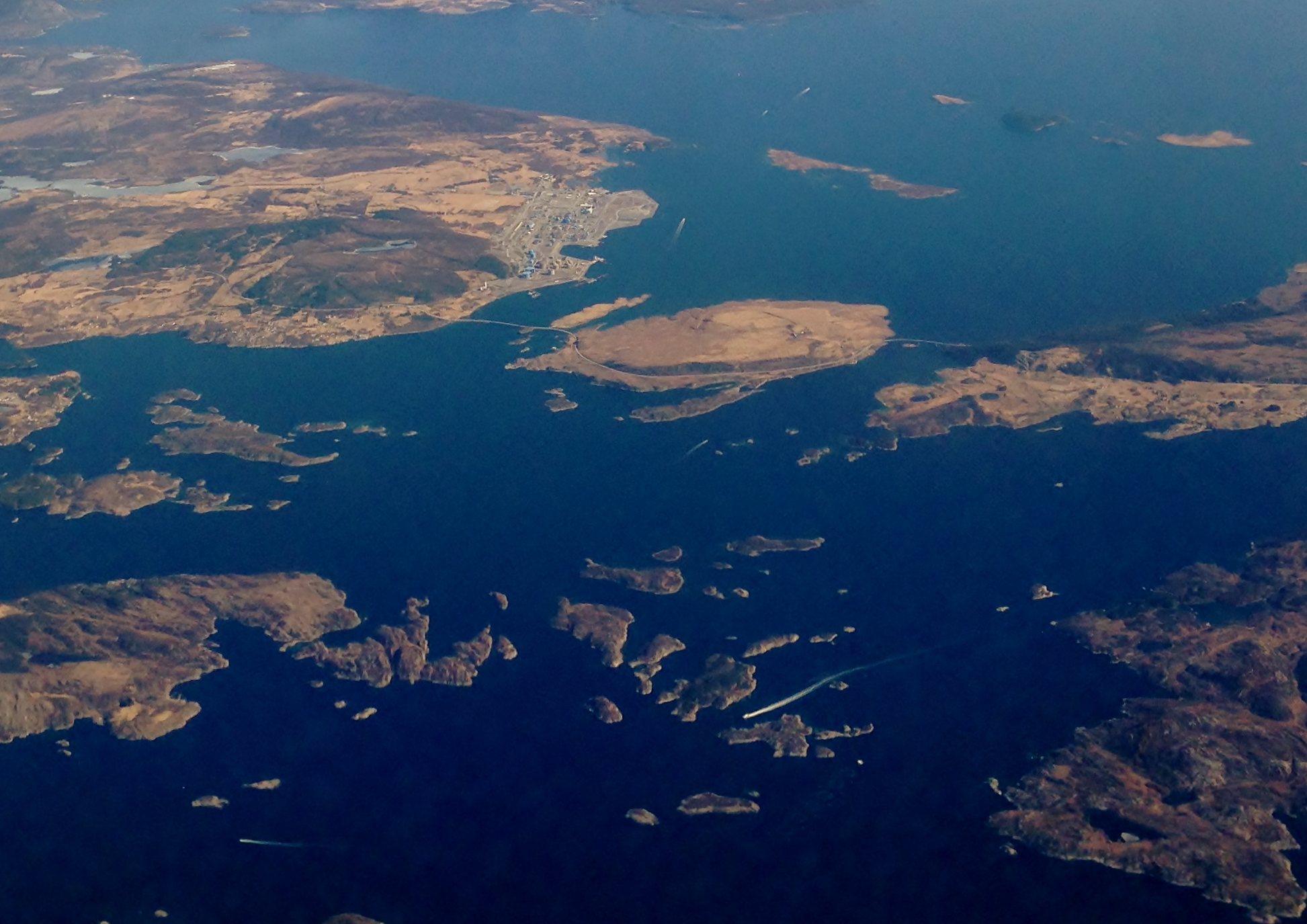
- View of Ognøya (center) with mainland to the left and Austre Bokn to the right
- Interactive map of the island
- Other names: Ogn / Ognøy (unofficial)

Geography
- Location: Rogaland, Norway
- Coordinates: 59.261°N 5.47171°E
- Area: 5.5 km^{2} (2.1 sq mi)
- Length: 2.3 km (1.43 mi)
- Width: 1.4 km (0.87 mi)
- Highest elevation: 78 m (256 ft)
- Highest point: Kvaløyfjellet

Administration
- Norway
- County: Rogaland
- Municipality: Bokn Municipality

Ognøya is an island in Bokn Municipality in Rogaland county, Norway. The 5.5-square-kilometre (2.1 sq mi) island lies between the mainland and the islands of Austre Bokn and Vestre Bokn. The islands are connected by a series of bridges as part of the European route E39 highway. The industrial area of Kårstø lies just north of Ognøya on the mainland.

The island is mostly rocky and barren with little population. There is a small group of houses on the southern part of the island in the one relatively flat, arable area on the island. The highest point on the small island is the 78-metre (256 ft) tall Kvaløyfjellet.

== See also ==
- List of islands of Norway
