= Sør-Rogaland District Court =

First-instance law court in southeast Norway

- Sør-Rogaland tingrett
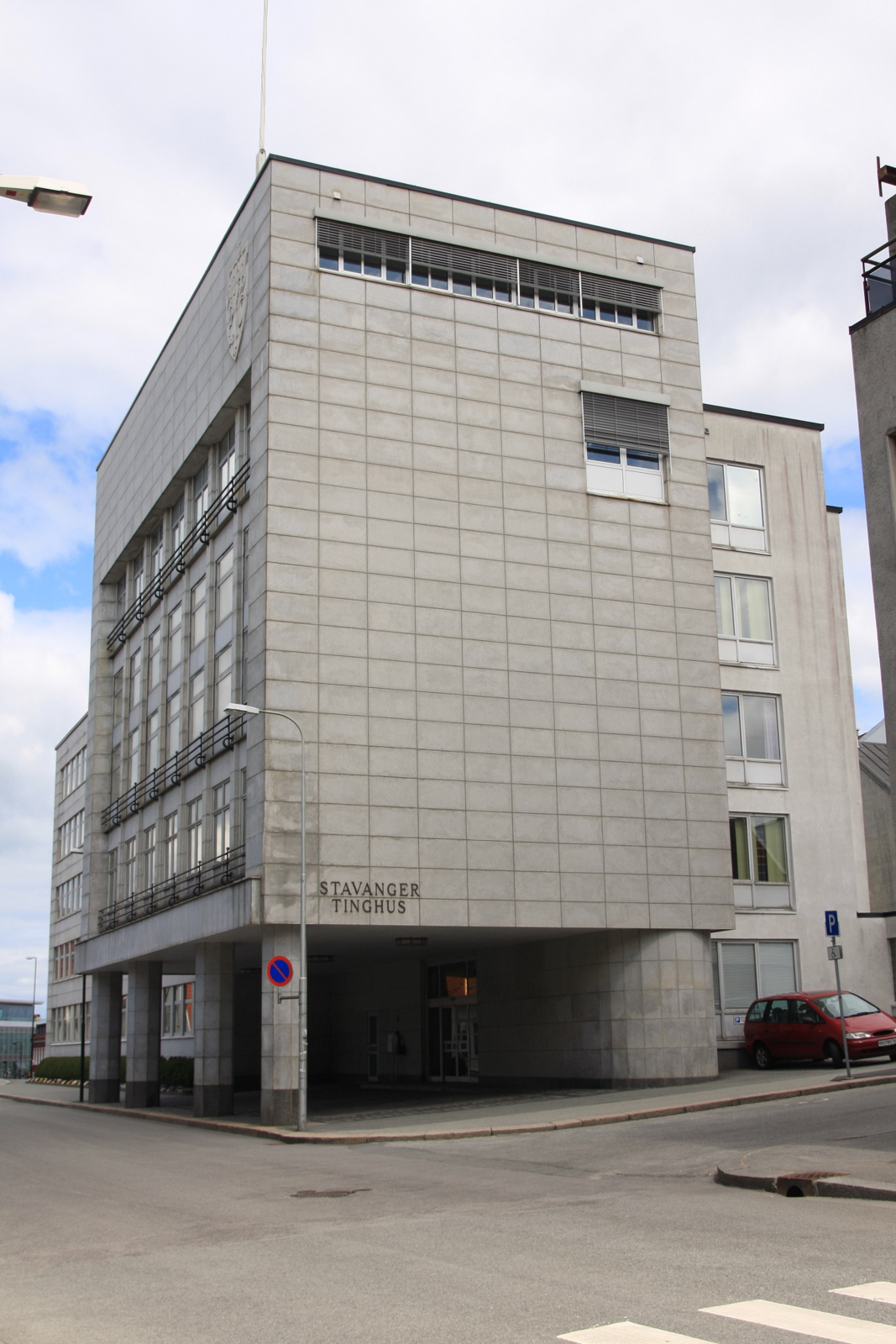
- Courthouse in Stavanger
- 58°58′10″N 5°44′11″E
- Established: 26 April 2021
- Jurisdiction: South Rogaland and Sirdal, Norway
- Location: Stavanger, Egersund, and Sandnes
- Coordinates: 58°58′10″N 5°44′11″E
- Appeals to: Gulating Court of Appeal
- Website: Official website

Sør-Rogaland District Court (Norwegian: Sør-Rogaland tingrett) is a district court located in Rogaland and Agder counties in Norway. This court is based at three different courthouses which are located in Stavanger, Sandnes, and Egersund. The court serves the southern part of Rogaland plus Sirdal Municipality in western Agder county. The court is subordinate to the Gulating Court of Appeal. The court accepts cases from 17 municipalities.

- The courthouse in Egersund accepts cases from the municipalities of Bjerkreim, Eigersund, Gjesdal, Lund, Sirdal, and Sokndal.
- The courthouse in Sandnes accepts cases from the municipalities of Hå, Klepp, Sandnes, and Time.
- The courthouse in Stavanger accepts cases from the municipalities of Hjelmeland, Kvitsøy, Randaberg, Sola, Stavanger, and Strand.

The court is led by a chief judge (sorenskriver) and several other judges. The court is a court of first instance. Its judicial duties are mainly to settle criminal cases and to resolve civil litigation as well as bankruptcy. The administration and registration tasks of the court include death registration, issuing certain certificates, performing duties of a notary public, and officiating civil wedding ceremonies. Cases from this court are heard by a combination of professional judges and lay judges.

== History ==
This court was established on 26 April 2021 after the old Dalane District Court, Jæren District Court, and Stavanger District Court were merged into one court. The new district court system continues to use the courthouses from the predecessor courts.
