= Austre Bokn =

Island in Rogaland, Norway

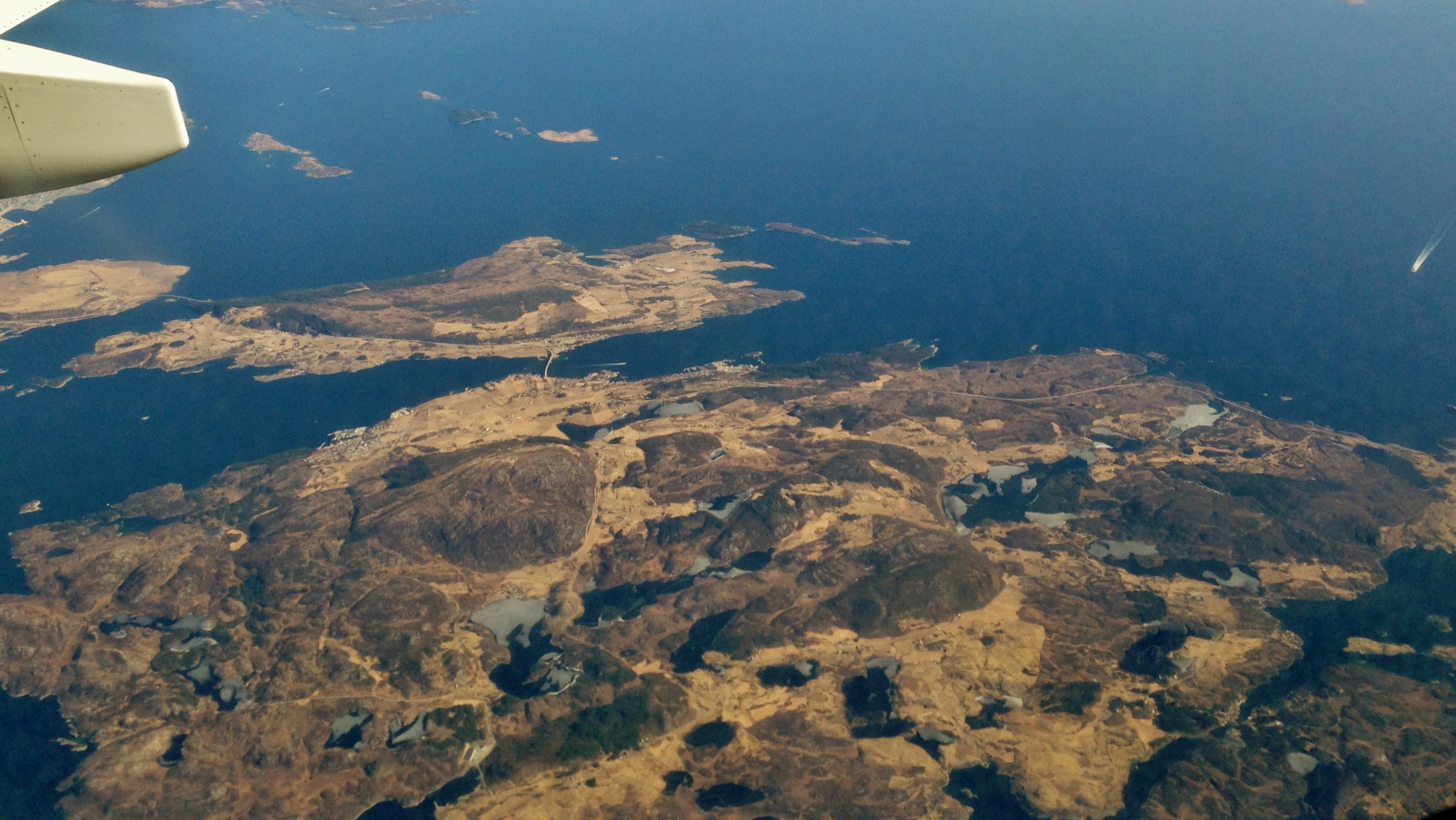
- It is the smaller island above the large island
- Interactive map of the island

Geography
- Location: Rogaland, Norway
- Coordinates: 59.23639°N 5.47664°E
- Area: 7.5 km^{2} (2.9 sq mi)
- Length: 5.2 km (3.23 mi)
- Width: 2.3 km (1.43 mi)
- Highest elevation: 188 m (617 ft)
- Highest point: Vardefjellet

Administration
- Norway
- County: Rogaland
- Municipality: Bokn Municipality

Demographics
- Population: 196 (2018)
- Pop. density: 26.4/km^{2} (68.4/sq mi)

Austre Bokn is an island in Bokn Municipality in Rogaland county, Norway. The 7.5-square-kilometre (2.9 sq mi) island lies on the northern side of the Boknafjorden between the islands of Ognøya and Vestre Bokn. It's connected to the other two islands and to the mainland by a series of bridges along the European route E39 highway. Both islands are separated from Austre Bokn by very small channels that are only about 250 to 350 metres (820 to 1,150 ft) wide.

Most of the island is barren, rocky, and uninhabited. The 188-metre (617 ft) tall Vardefjellet is the highest point on the island. The majority of the island's population is located along the western and southern shores. With less than 200 residents on the island, it is the second most populous island in the municipality (only 3 islands in Bokn Municipality are populated).

== See also ==
- List of islands of Norway
