= Bokn Church =

Church in Rogaland, Norway

- Bokn kyrkje
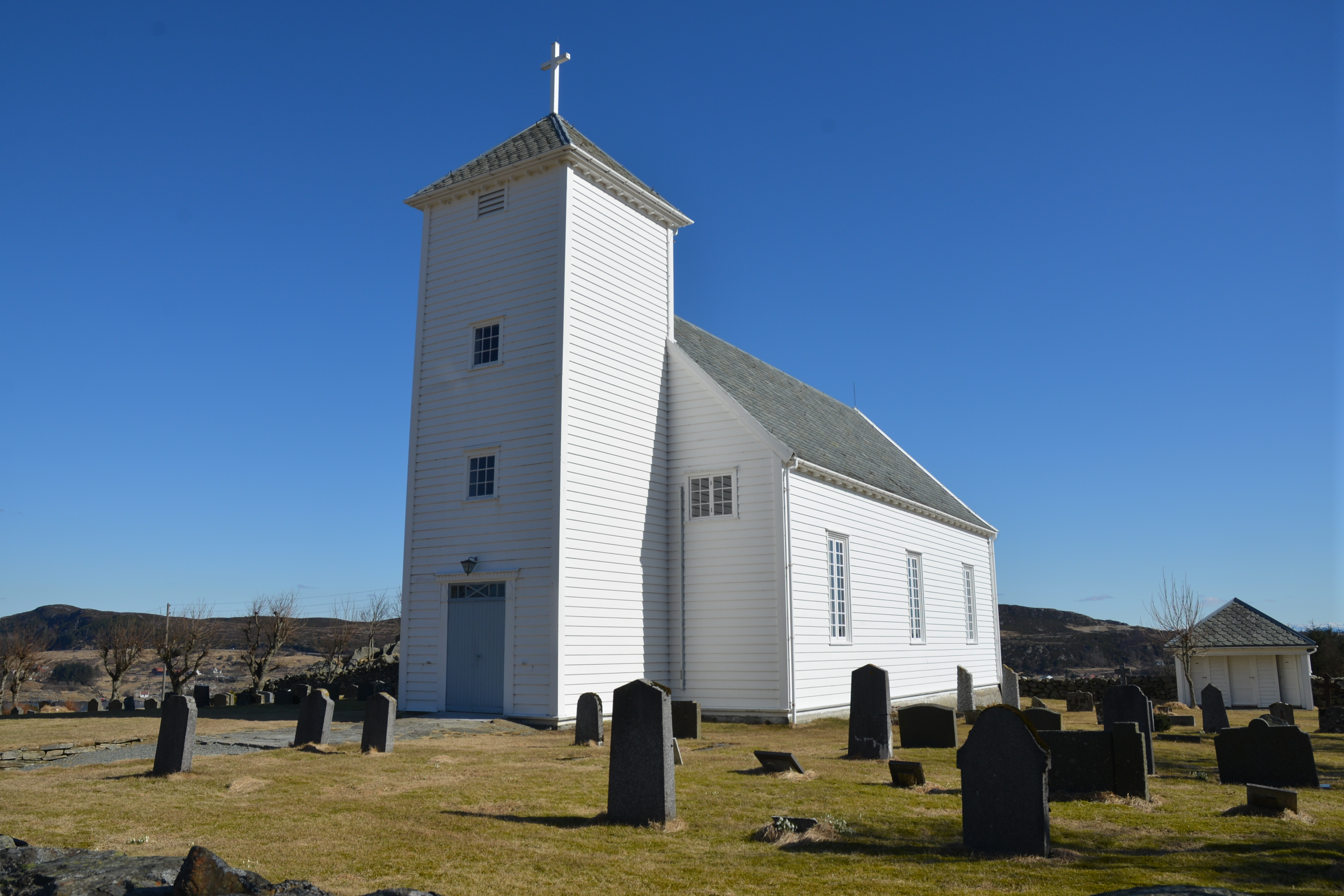
- View of the church
- Bokn Church
- 59.223765°N 5.440646°E
- Location: Bokn Municipality, Rogaland
- Country: Norway
- Denomination: Church of Norway
- Churchmanship: Evangelical Lutheran

History
- Status: Parish church
- Founded: 12th century
- Consecrated: 1847

Architecture
- Functional status: Active
- Architect: Hans Linstow
- Architectural type: Long church
- Completed: 1847 (179 years ago)

Specifications
- Capacity: 300
- Materials: Wood

Administration
- Diocese: Stavanger bispedømme
- Deanery: Haugaland prosti
- Parish: Bokn
- Norwegian Cultural Heritage Site
- Type: Church
- Status: Automatically protected
- ID: 83923

Bokn Church (Norwegian: Bokn kyrkje) is a parish church of the Church of Norway in Bokn Municipality in Rogaland county, Norway. It is located in the village of Føresvik. It is the church for the Bokn parish which is part of the Haugaland prosti (deanery) in the Diocese of Stavanger. The white, wooden church was built in a long church style in 1847 using designs by the architect Hans Linstow. The church seats about 300 people.

== History ==
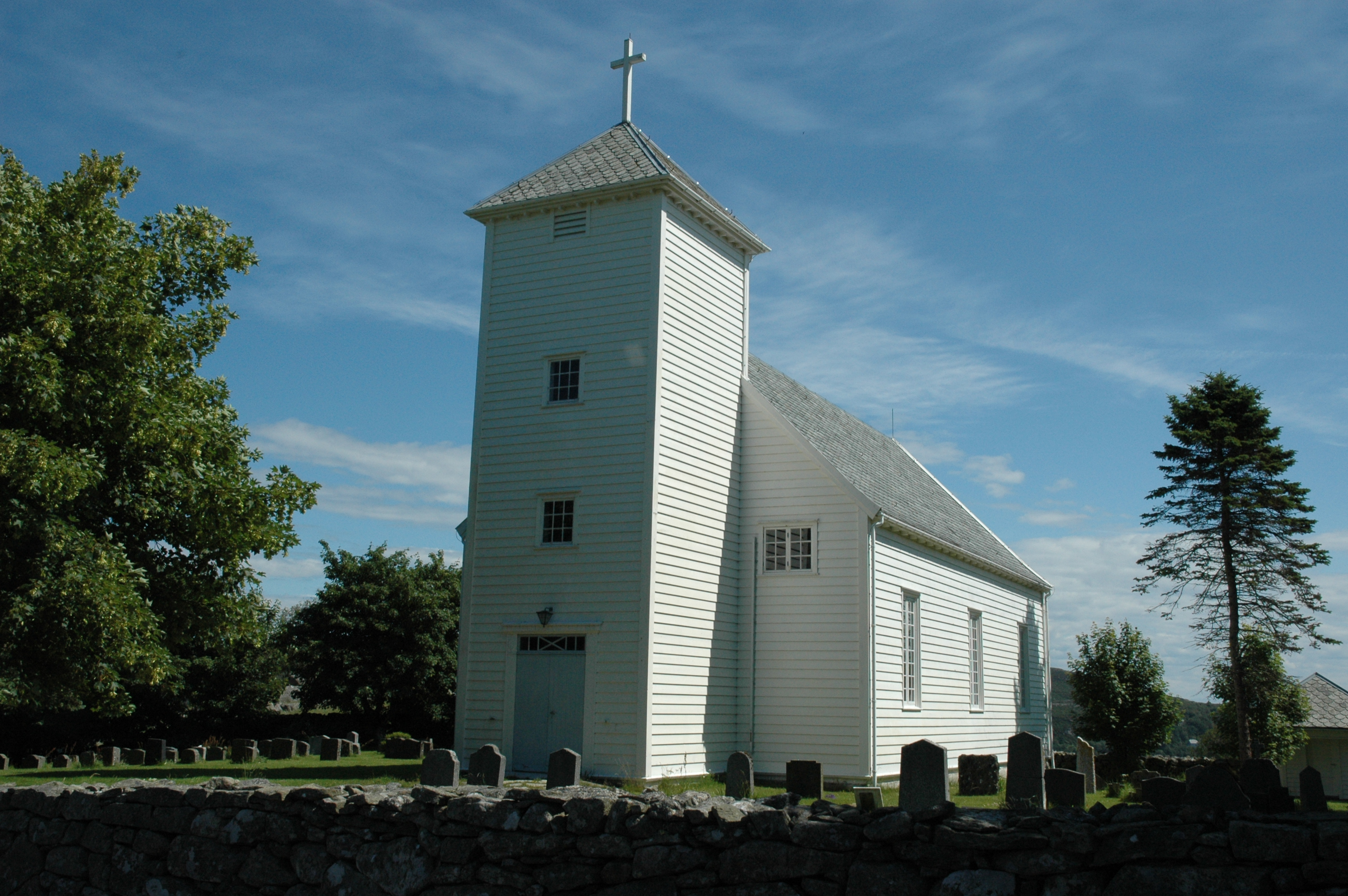
View of the church

The earliest existing historical records of the church date back to the year 1620, but the church was likely built in the 12th century, since that is when the church's baptismal font was made. The first church here was probably a stave church. In 1686, the old stave church was torn down and replaced with a new (small) timber-framed church on the same site. In 1846, the church was again demolished and in 1847 a new church was built on the same site. The church met in a barn on the Laupland farm while the new church was being constructed. In 1933, a new sacristy and choir were added on to the building. In 1950 and again in 1990, the church cemetery was expanded on farmland across the street from the church.

== See also ==
- List of churches in Rogaland
