= Bokn Municipality =

Municipality in Rogaland, Norway

Bokn Municipality Bokn kommune
- Municipality
- Bukken herred (historic name)
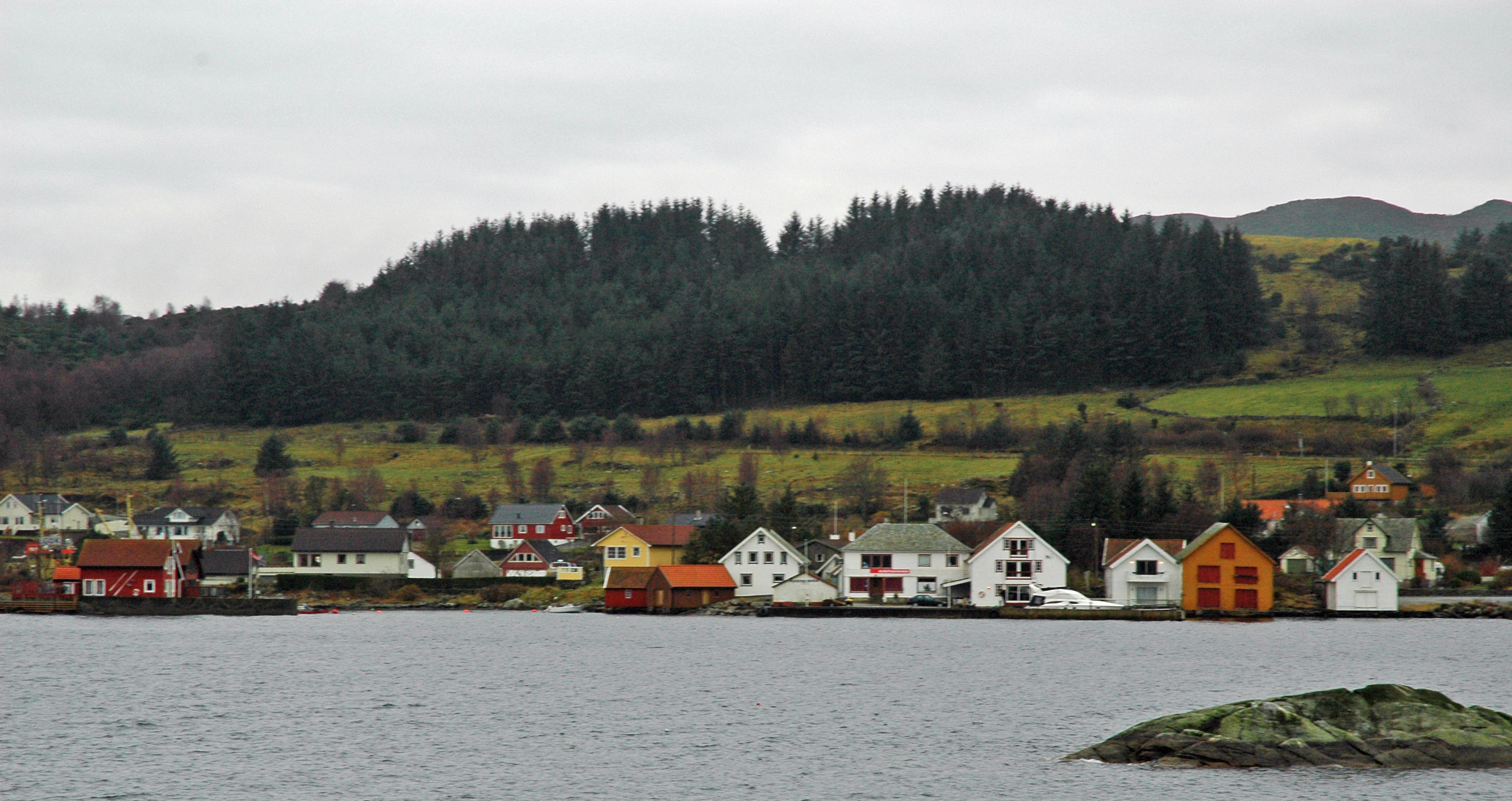
- View of Alvestadkroken in Bokn

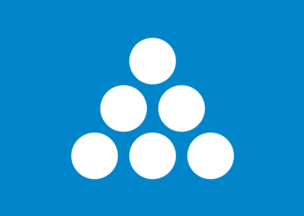
- Flag Coat of arms

- Rogaland within Norway

- Bokn within Rogaland
- Coordinates: 59°12′01″N 05°25′23″E
- Country: Norway
- County: Rogaland
- District: Haugaland
- Established: 1849
  - Preceded by: Skudenes Municipality
- Administrative centre: Føresvik

Government
  - Mayor (2023): Egil Våge (Sp)

Area
  - Total: 47.15 km^{2} (18.20 sq mi)
  - Land: 44.53 km^{2} (17.19 sq mi)
  - Water: 2.62 km^{2} (1.01 sq mi) 5.6%
  - Rank: #349 in Norway
- Highest elevation: 293.28 m (962.2 ft)

Population (2026)
  - Total: 907
  - Rank: #340 in Norway
  - Density: 19.2/km^{2} (50/sq mi)
  - Change (10 years): ▲ +4.9%
- Demonym: Boknar

Official language
  - Norwegian form: Nynorsk
- Time zone: UTC+01:00 (CET)
  - Summer (DST): UTC+02:00 (CEST)
- ISO 3166 code: NO-1145
- Website: Official website

Bokn is a municipality in Rogaland county, Norway. It is located in the traditional district of Haugaland. The administrative centre of the municipality is the village of Føresvik, the only urban area in Bokn. Other villages in Bokn include Arsvågen, Trosnavåg, and Loten. The island municipality is mostly located on the three islands of Ognøya, Vestre Bokn, and Austre Bokn, plus some smaller surrounding uninhabited islets. All three main islands are connected to the mainland via a network of bridges. The Rogfast tunnel system is under construction. It will connect Bokn Municipality to Stavanger by road.

The 47.15-square-kilometre (18.20 sq mi) municipality is the 349th largest by area out of the 357 municipalities in Norway. Bokn Municipality is the 340th most populous municipality in Norway with a population of 907. The municipality's population density is 19.2 inhabitants per square kilometre (50/sq mi) and its population has increased by 4.6% over the previous ten-year period.

== General information ==
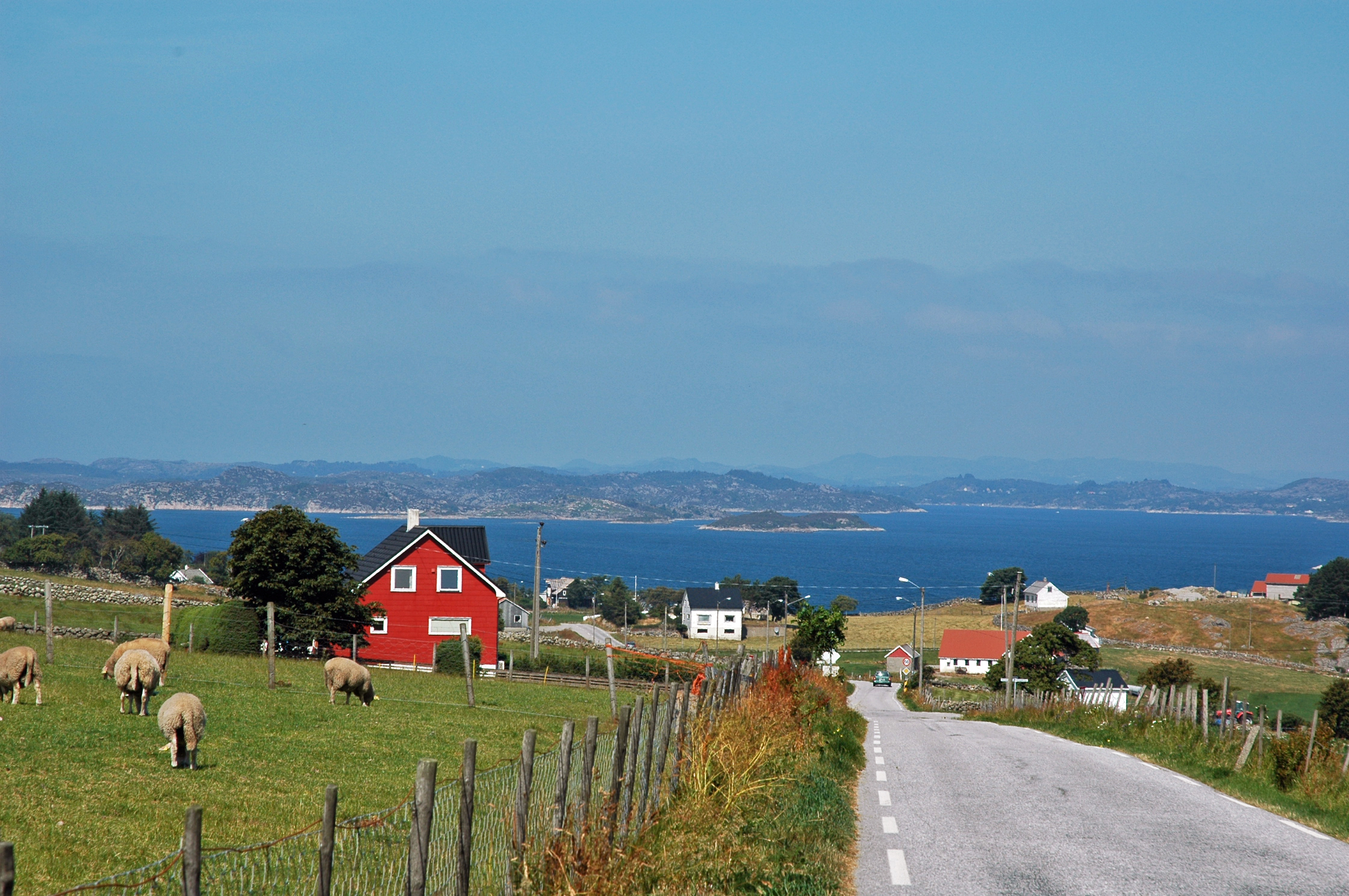
View of Vestre Bokn island

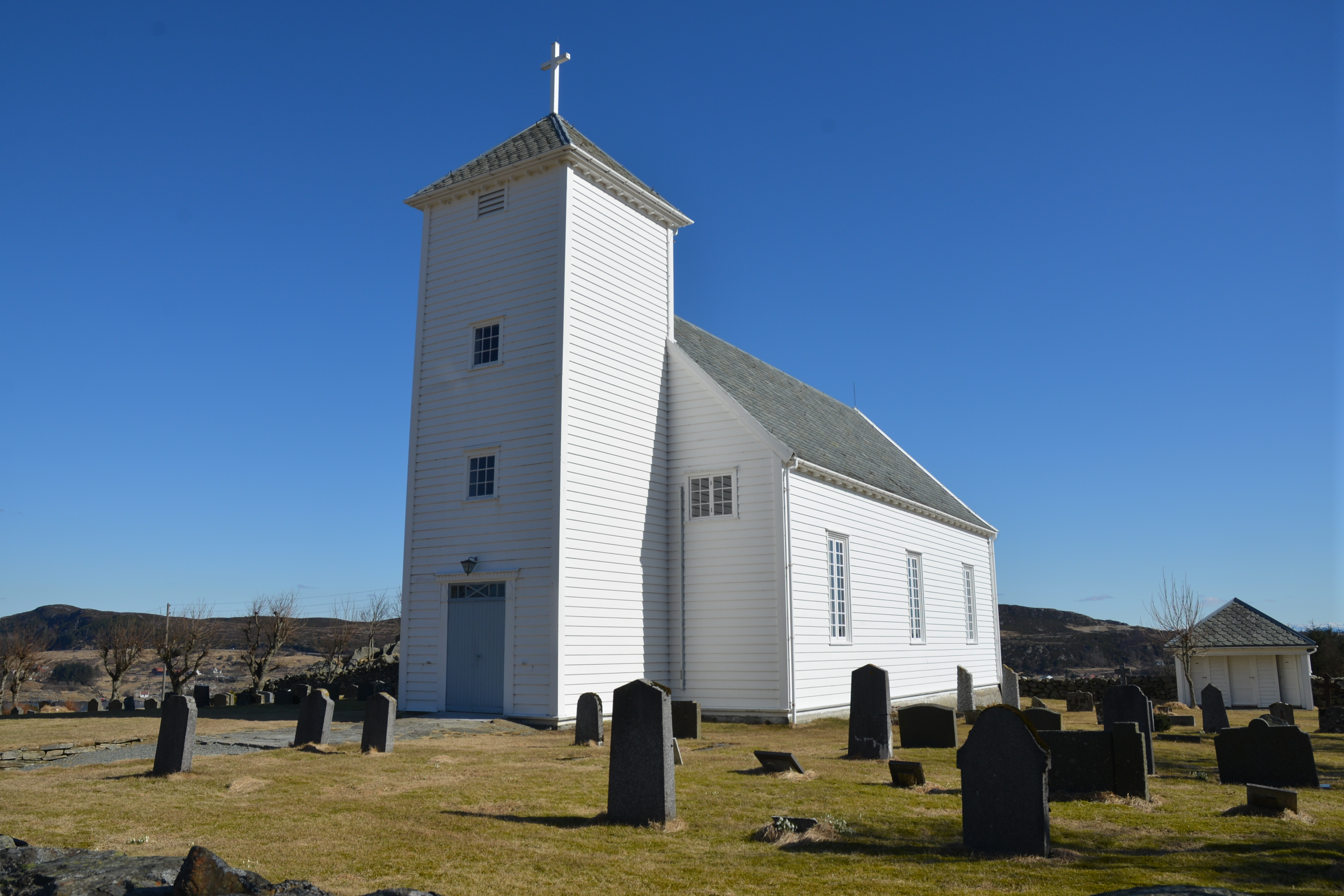
View of Bokn Church

The municipality of Bokn (historically spelled Bukken) was established in 1849 when it was separated from the large Skudenes Municipality. Initially, Bokn Municipality had 1,035 residents. The borders of Bokn Municipality have not changed since that time.

=== Name ===
The municipality (originally the parish) is named after the islands of Austre Bokn and Vestre Bokn (Old Norse: Bókn). The meaning of the name is uncertain. It is possible that the word was derived from the Old High German word bouchen which means "sea mark" or "beacon", possibly referring to the local mountain that was a navigational mark for boats. Before 1889, the name was spelled "Bukken".

=== Coat of arms ===
The coat of arms was granted on 8 August 1986. The official blazon is "Azure, six plates, one over two over three" (Norwegian: På blå grunn seks sølv myntar, 1-2-3). This means the arms have a blue field (background) and the charge is a set of six circles. The set of circles has a tincture of argent which means it is commonly colored white, but if it is made out of metal, then silver is used. The blue background represents the sea and the set of six circles represent coins, which symbolize the richness from the sea since it is an island municipality and therefore dependent on fishing and sailing. The six circles are set in a triangle to symbolize a cairn, representing the fact that the island was historically used as a sea mark for sailors. The municipal flag has the same design as the coat of arms.

=== Churches ===
The Church of Norway has one parish (sokn) within Bokn Municipality. It is part of the Haugaland prosti (deanery) in the Diocese of Stavanger.

Churches in Bokn Municipality
Parish (sokn)	Church name	Location of the church	Year built
Bokn	Bokn Church	Føresvik	1847

=== Buildings and structures ===
There is a 168-metre (551 ft) tall guyed mast for FM-/TV-broadcasting at located at 59.220156°N 5.428281°E.

== Geography ==
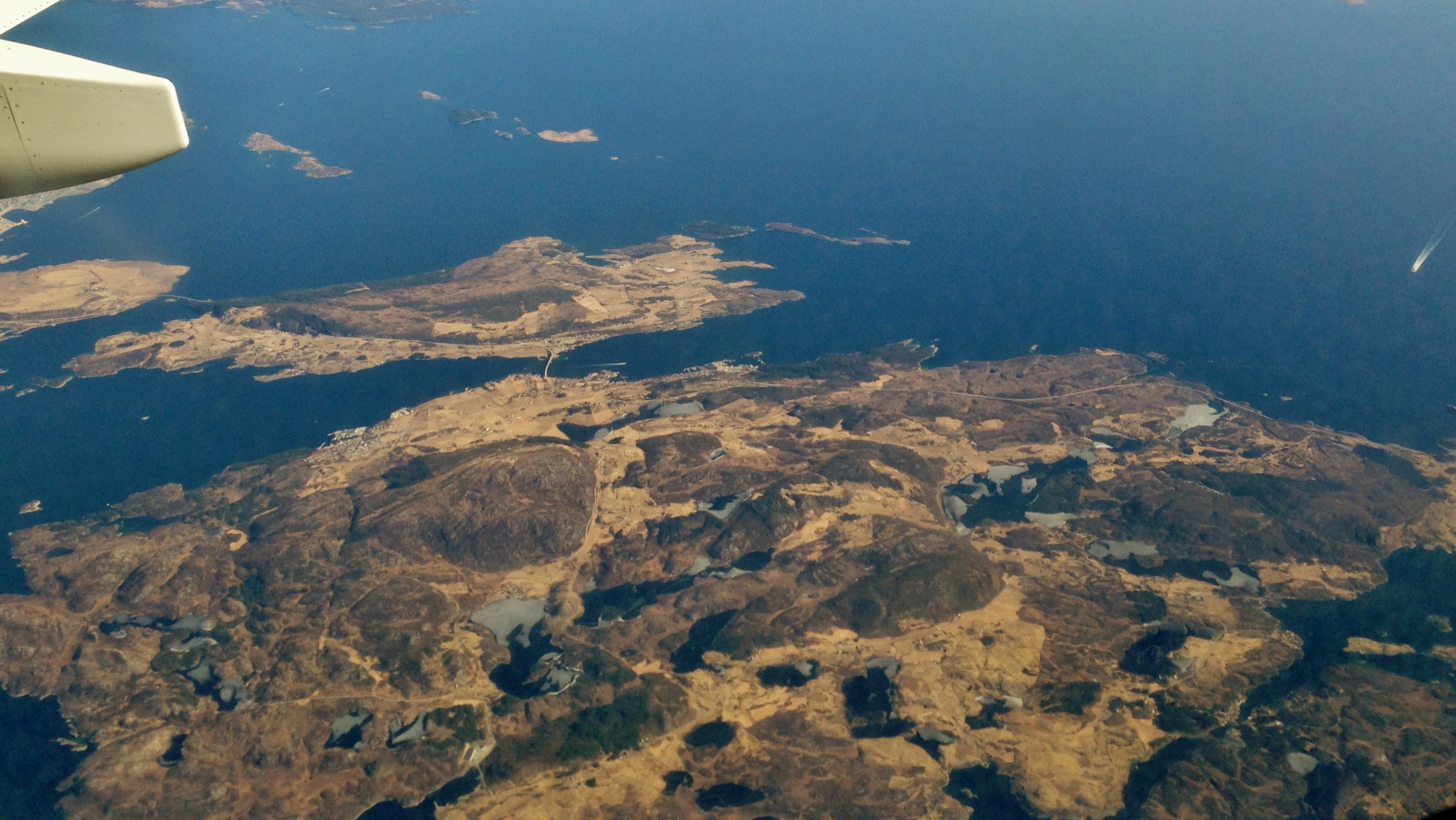
Aerial view of the islands of Bokn

The island municipality of Bokn is located on the northern side of the Boknafjorden, at the southern end of the Karmsundet strait. The island of Karmøy lies to the west and the mainland of Tysvær Municipality is located to the northeast. The islands of Kvitsøy Municipality lie south and the islands of Stavanger Municipality lie to the southeast.

Bokn Municipality is one of the smallest municipalities in Rogaland, consisting of three main islands: Ognøya, Austre Bokn, and Vestre Bokn. There are also some smaller, uninhabited islands surrounding the main islands.

The islands are rugged with many small hills with small lakes in the valleys. The hills are largely covered with heather, but bushes and trees are increasingly competing, especially birch. The highest point in the municipality is the 293.28-metre (962.2 ft) tall mountain Boknafjellet, a small mountain on the island of Vestre Bokn.

=== Climate ===
Climate data for Foresvik, Bokn
Month	Jan	Feb	Mar	Apr	May	Jun	Jul	Aug	Sep	Oct	Nov	Dec	Year
Daily mean °C (°F)	1.7 (35.1)	1.3 (34.3)	2.7 (36.9)	5.2 (41.4)	9.5 (49.1)	12.5 (54.5)	14.0 (57.2)	14.1 (57.4)	11.7 (53.1)	9.0 (48.2)	5.3 (41.5)	3.1 (37.6)	7.5 (45.5)
Average precipitation mm (inches)	120 (4.7)	85 (3.3)	105 (4.1)	70 (2.8)	75 (3.0)	85 (3.3)	95 (3.7)	130 (5.1)	180 (7.1)	175 (6.9)	170 (6.7)	145 (5.7)	1,435 (56.5)
Source: Norwegian Meteorological Institute

== Government ==
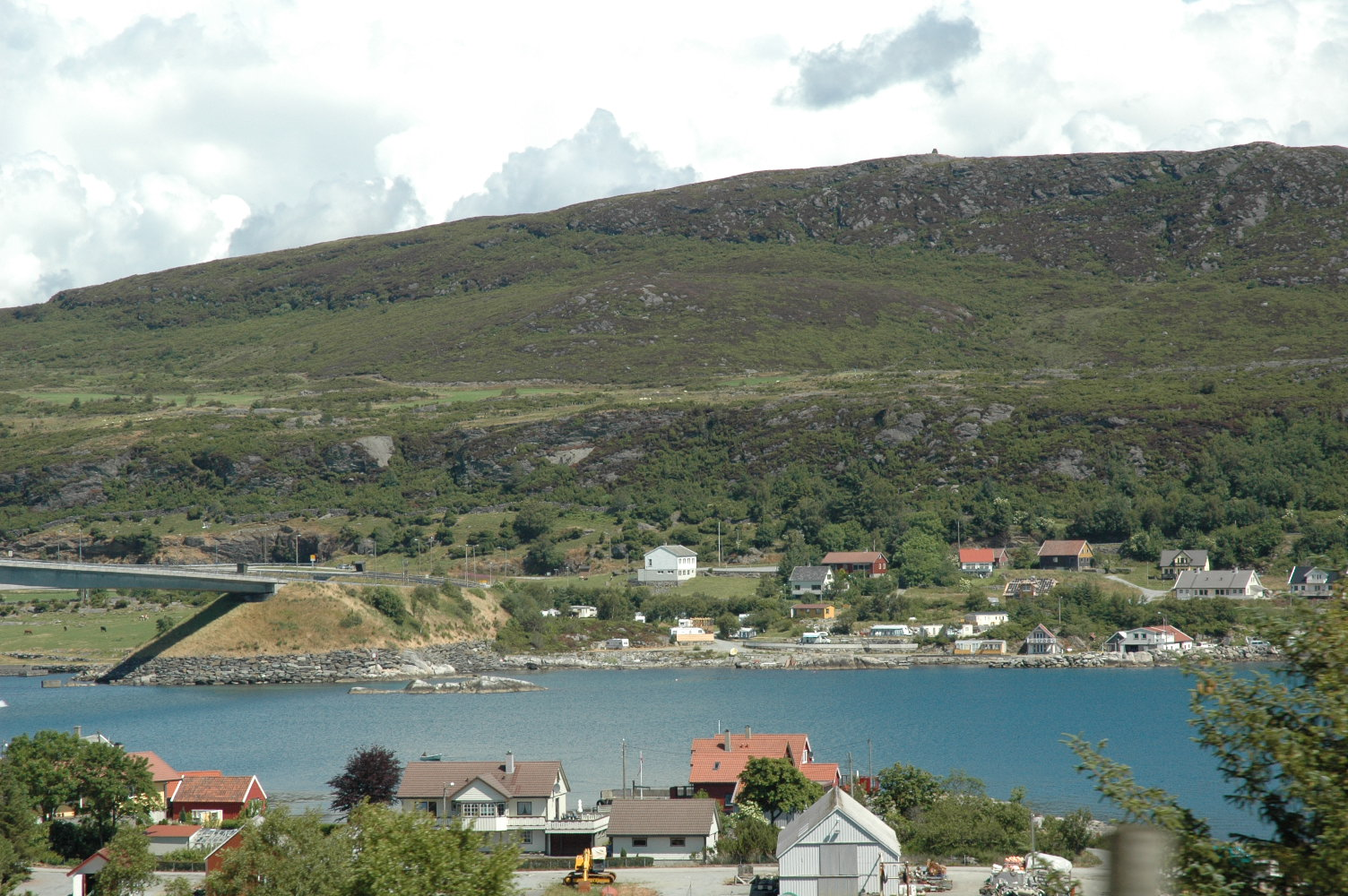
View of Austre Bokn island

Bokn Municipality is responsible for primary education (through 10th grade), outpatient health services, senior citizen services, welfare and other social services, zoning, economic development, and municipal roads and utilities. The municipality is governed by a municipal council of directly elected representatives. The mayor is indirectly elected by a vote of the municipal council. The municipality is under the jurisdiction of the Haugaland og Sunnhordland District Court and the Gulating Court of Appeal.

=== Municipal council ===
The municipal council (Kommunestyre) of Bokn Municipality is made up of 17 representatives that are elected to four-year terms. The tables below show the current and historical composition of the council by political party.

Bokn kommunestyre 2023–2027
Party name (in Nynorsk)	Number of representatives
Labour Party (Arbeidarpartiet)	4
Conservative Party (Høgre)	6
Christian Democratic Party (Kristeleg Folkeparti)	1
Centre Party (Senterpartiet)	6
Total number of members:	17

Bokn kommunestyre 2019–2023
Party name (in Nynorsk)	Number of representatives
Labour Party (Arbeidarpartiet)	5
Conservative Party (Høgre)	4
Christian Democratic Party (Kristeleg Folkeparti)	1
Centre Party (Senterpartiet)	7
Total number of members:	17

Bokn kommunestyre 2015–2019
Party name (in Nynorsk)	Number of representatives
Labour Party (Arbeidarpartiet)	3
Conservative Party (Høgre)	5
Christian Democratic Party (Kristeleg Folkeparti)	1
Centre Party (Senterpartiet)	8
Total number of members:	17

Bokn kommunestyre 2011–2015
Party name (in Nynorsk)	Number of representatives
Labour Party (Arbeidarpartiet)	6
Conservative Party (Høgre)	5
Christian Democratic Party (Kristeleg Folkeparti)	1
Centre Party (Senterpartiet)	5
Total number of members:	17

Bokn kommunestyre 2007–2011
Party name (in Nynorsk)	Number of representatives
Labour Party (Arbeidarpartiet)	6
Conservative Party (Høgre)	4
Christian Democratic Party (Kristeleg Folkeparti)	1
Centre Party (Senterpartiet)	6
Total number of members:	17

Bokn kommunestyre 2003–2007
Party name (in Nynorsk)	Number of representatives
Labour Party (Arbeidarpartiet)	3
Conservative Party (Høgre)	7
Christian Democratic Party (Kristeleg Folkeparti)	2
Centre Party (Senterpartiet)	5
Total number of members:	17

Bokn kommunestyre 1999–2003
Party name (in Nynorsk)	Number of representatives
Labour Party (Arbeidarpartiet)	3
Conservative Party (Høgre)	5
Christian Democratic Party (Kristeleg Folkeparti)	3
Centre Party (Senterpartiet)	6
Total number of members:	17

Bokn kommunestyre 1995–1999
Party name (in Nynorsk)	Number of representatives
Labour Party (Arbeidarpartiet)	4
Conservative Party (Høgre)	4
Christian Democratic Party (Kristeleg Folkeparti)	2
Centre Party (Senterpartiet)	7
Total number of members:	17

Bokn kommunestyre 1991–1995
Party name (in Nynorsk)	Number of representatives
Labour Party (Arbeidarpartiet)	3
Conservative Party (Høgre)	4
Christian Democratic Party (Kristeleg Folkeparti)	2
Centre Party (Senterpartiet)	8
Total number of members:	17

Bokn kommunestyre 1987–1991
Party name (in Nynorsk)	Number of representatives
Labour Party (Arbeidarpartiet)	4
Conservative Party (Høgre)	4
Christian Democratic Party (Kristeleg Folkeparti)	2
Centre Party (Senterpartiet)	7
Total number of members:	17

Bokn kommunestyre 1983–1987
Party name (in Nynorsk)	Number of representatives
Labour Party (Arbeidarpartiet)	3
Conservative Party (Høgre)	4
Christian Democratic Party (Kristeleg Folkeparti)	3
Centre Party (Senterpartiet)	7
Total number of members:	17

Bokn kommunestyre 1979–1983
Party name (in Nynorsk)	Number of representatives
Labour Party (Arbeidarpartiet)	3
Conservative Party (Høgre)	6
Christian Democratic Party (Kristeleg Folkeparti)	3
Centre Party (Senterpartiet)	5
Total number of members:	17

Bokn kommunestyre 1975–1979
Party name (in Nynorsk)	Number of representatives
Labour Party (Arbeidarpartiet)	1
Conservative Party (Høgre)	3
Christian Democratic Party (Kristeleg Folkeparti)	3
Centre Party (Senterpartiet)	10
Total number of members:	17

Bokn kommunestyre 1971–1975
Party name (in Nynorsk)	Number of representatives
Labour Party (Arbeidarpartiet)	4
Conservative Party (Høgre)	3
Centre Party (Senterpartiet)	10
Total number of members:	17

Bokn kommunestyre 1967–1971
Party name (in Nynorsk)	Number of representatives
Labour Party (Arbeidarpartiet)	2
Conservative Party (Høgre)	2
Centre Party (Senterpartiet)	9
Liberal Party (Venstre)	4
Total number of members:	17

Bokn kommunestyre 1963–1967
Party name (in Nynorsk)	Number of representatives
Labour Party (Arbeidarpartiet)	3
Centre Party (Senterpartiet)	8
Liberal Party (Venstre)	6
Total number of members:	17

Bokn heradsstyre 1959–1963
Party name (in Nynorsk)	Number of representatives
Labour Party (Arbeidarpartiet)	2
Centre Party (Senterpartiet)	7
Local List(s) (Lokale lister)	4
Total number of members:	13

Bokn heradsstyre 1955–1959
Party name (in Nynorsk)	Number of representatives
Labour Party (Arbeidarpartiet)	2
Joint List(s) of Non-Socialist Parties (Borgarlege Felleslister)	11
Total number of members:	13

Bokn heradsstyre 1951–1955
Party name (in Nynorsk)	Number of representatives
Local List(s) (Lokale lister)	12
Total number of members:	12

Bokn heradsstyre 1947–1951
Party name (in Nynorsk)	Number of representatives
List of workers, fishermen, and small farmholders (Arbeidarar, fiskarar, småbrukarar liste)	5
Joint List(s) of Non-Socialist Parties (Borgarlege Felleslister)	4
Local List(s) (Lokale lister)	3
Total number of members:	12

Bokn heradsstyre 1945–1947
Party name (in Nynorsk)	Number of representatives
Local List(s) (Lokale lister)	12
Total number of members:	12

Bokn heradsstyre 1937–1941*
Party name (in Nynorsk)	Number of representatives
Local List(s) (Lokale lister)	12
Total number of members:	12
Note: Due to the German occupation of Norway during World War II, no elections were held for new municipal councils until after the war ended in 1945.

=== Mayors ===
The mayor (Nynorsk: ordførar) of Bokn Municipality is the political leader of the municipality and the chairperson of the municipal council. The following people have held this position:

- 1849–1851: Lars Rasmusson Loden
- 1852–1853: Daniel Larsson Trosnavåg
- 1854–1855: Kristoffer Larsson Øvrabø
- 1856–1857: Ingebrigt Ingebrigtsson Laupland
- 1858–1865: Lars Rasmusson Loden
- 1866–1867: Bjørn Torbjørnsson Nerabø
- 1868–1869: Torgils Olsson Alvestad
- 1870–1873: Valentin Tormodsson Våga
- 1874–1885: Kristoffer Perdersson Vatnaland
- 1886–1910: Jakob Pedersson Torland
- 1911–1913: Gabriel Dybing
- 1914–1916: Jakob Hognaland
- 1917–1919: Gabriel Dybing
- 1920–1922: Martin Jøsang
- 1923–1925: Julius Håland
- 1925–1934: Elisæus Vatnaland (Bp)
- 1935–1937: Julius Håland
- 1938–1941: Jens L. Vatnaland (Bp)
- 1942–1945: Tønnes Bryningsland (NS)
- 1945–1945: Jens L. Vatnaland (Bp)
- 1946–1947: Monrad Alvestad (Ap)
- 1948–1951: Helge Alvestad
- 1952–1955: Osmund S. Våga (Bp)
- 1956–1963: Jens L. Vatnaland (Sp)
- 1964–1969: Ingolf Kro (Sp)
- 1970–1971: Sigvart Våga (Sp)
- 1972–1975: Leif Vatnaland (Sp)
- 1978–1979: Ingolf Kro (Sp)
- 1980–1981: Leif Vatnaland (Sp)
- 1982–1983: Arne Øvrebø (H)
- 1984–1995: Leif Vatnaland (Sp)
- 1995–1999: Sigrunn Hole Hosaas (Sp)
- 1999–2007: Svein Ove Alvestad (H)
- 2007–2015: Kyrre Lindanger (Ap)
- 2015–2019: Tormod Våga (Sp)
- 2019–2023: Osmund Våga (Sp)
- 2023–present: Egil Våge (Sp)

== Transportation ==
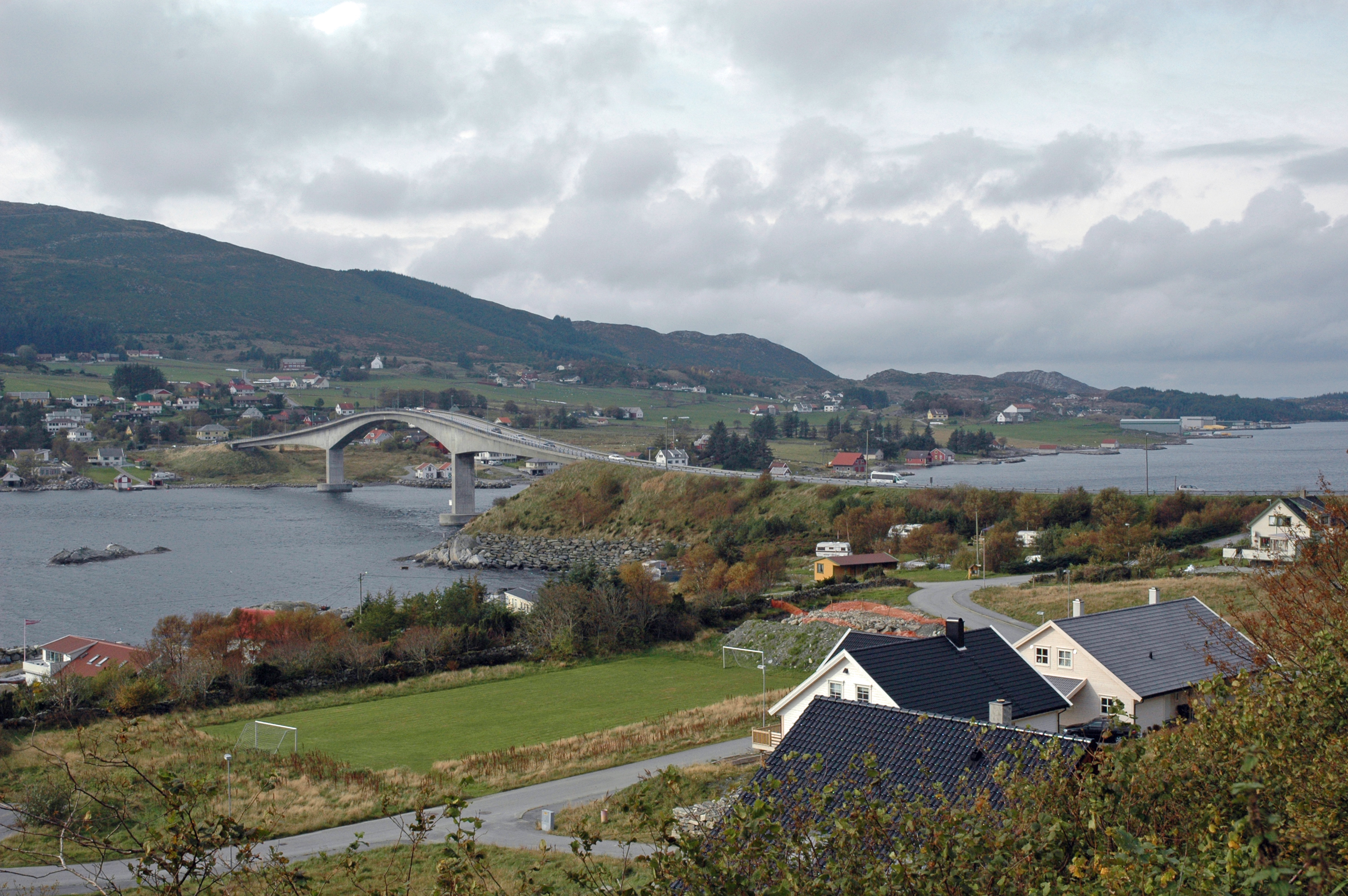
Bridge connecting Austre and Vestre Bokn islands

The three islands of Bokn are now linked via bridges to Tysvær Municipality on the mainland. These bridges are part of the European route E39 highway and they are part of the main coastal highway between the cities of Stavanger and Bergen. There is a ferry connection southward across the Boknafjorden to the nearby island of Rennesøy which is connected by road to Stavanger. The planned Rogfast undersea tunnel will directly connect both sides of the Boknafjorden from Stavanger to Bokn, with a planned completion date of 2033.

== Economy ==
Apart from a factory producing various tanks made of glassfiber-reinforced plastic (Bokn Plast), there is no industry on the islands other than some fish farming. People have traditionally lived off fishing and farming, but more recently, some work has been in the North Sea petroleum industry. Tourism is likely to play a bigger part in the future.

== Notable people ==
- Asbjørn Kloster (1823 in Vestre Bokn – 1876), a social reformer, minister, teacher, publisher, and leader of the Norwegian temperance movement
- Lars Elisæus Vatnaland (1892 in Bokn – 1983), a Norwegian politician and Mayor of Bokn municipality from 1925 to 1934
