= Vestre Bokn =

Island in Rogaland, Norway

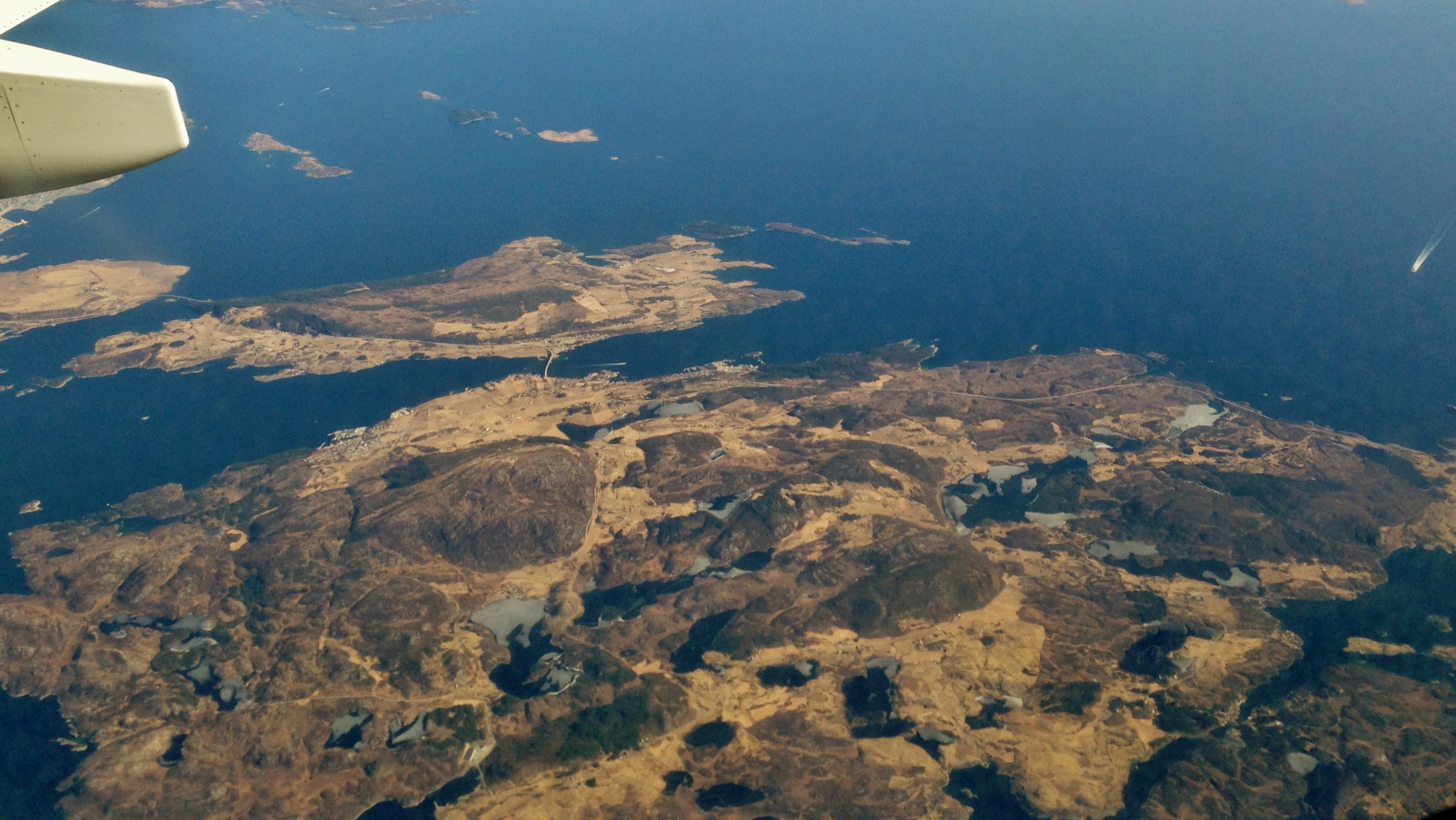
- Vestre Bokn is partially shown, the smaller island of Austre Bokn is above it.
- Interactive map of the island

Geography
- Location: Rogaland, Norway
- Coordinates: 59.20519°N 5.42026°E
- Area: 36 km^{2} (14 sq mi)
- Length: 10 km (6 mi)
- Width: 5.5 km (3.42 mi)
- Highest elevation: 293 m (961 ft)
- Highest point: Boknafjellet

Administration
- Norway
- County: Rogaland
- Municipality: Bokn Municipality

Demographics
- Population: 646 (2018)
- Pop. density: 18/km^{2} (47/sq mi)

Vestre Bokn is an island in Bokn Municipality in Rogaland county, Norway. The 36-square-kilometre (14 sq mi) island is the main island of the municipality. It lies on the northern side of the Boknafjorden at the southern end of the Karmsundet strait. Vestre Bokn lies between the islands of Karmøy (to the west) and Austre Bokn and Ognøya (to the northeast). The main population centre on the island is the village of Føresvik, the administrative centre of the whole municipality. There are about 646 inhabitants on the island (as of 2018).

Vestre Bokn is connected to the mainland via a series of bridges on the European route E39 highway which connect to Austre Bokn, then to Ognøya, and then to the mainland. There is a regular ferry route from the island across the Boknafjorden to the island of Rennesøy, which in turn is connected to the city of Stavanger by a series of roads, bridges, and tunnels. The Rogfast tunnel, which is currently under construction, will connect this island to the mainland Stavanger Peninsula to the south.

== See also ==
- List of islands of Norway
