= Gulating Court of Appeal =

Court of justice in Bergen, Norway

- Gulating lagmannsrett
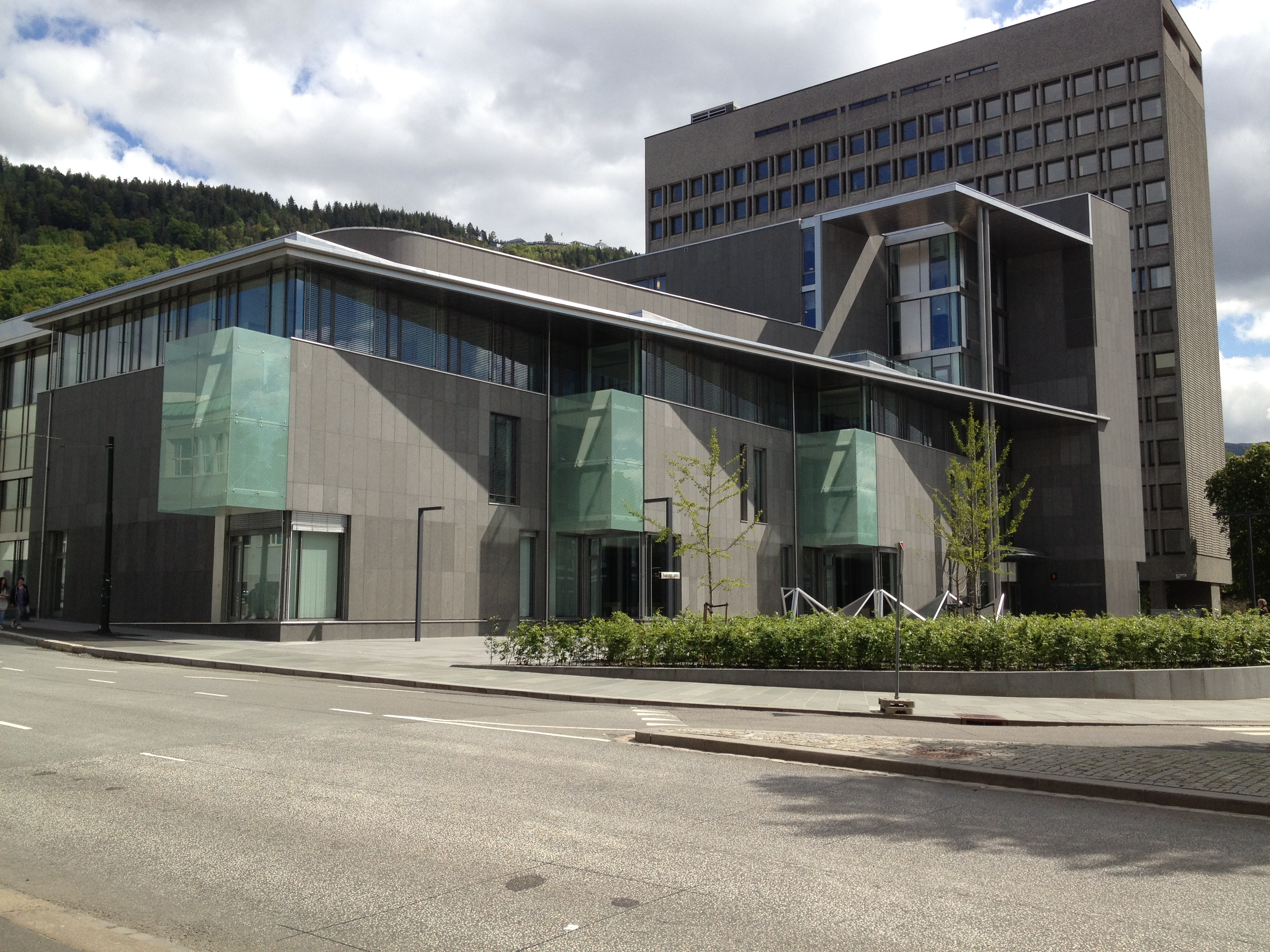
- Gulating Court of Appeal building in Bergen

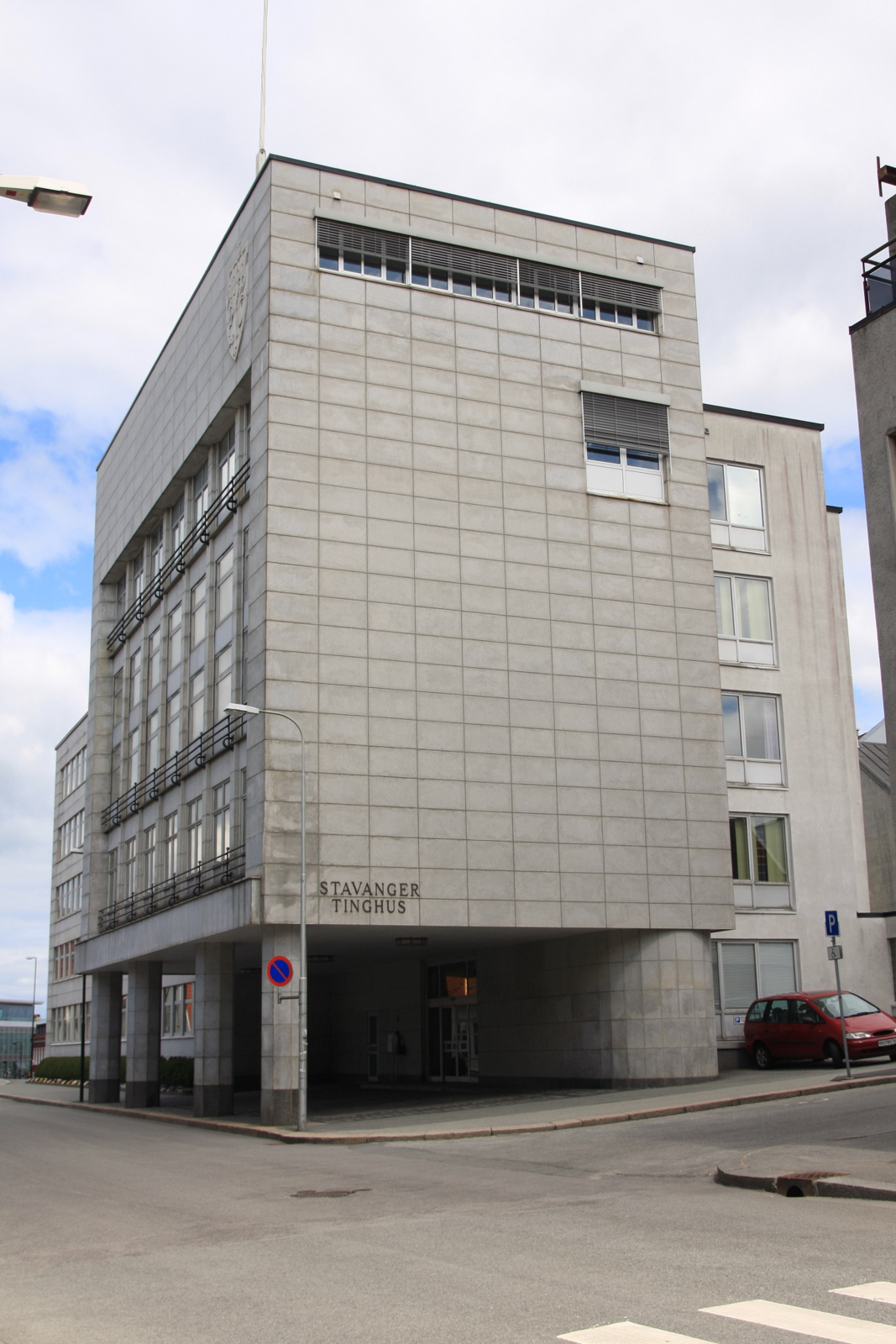
- Court building in Stavanger
- 60°23′31″N 5°19′39″E
- Established: 1 Jan 1890
- Jurisdiction: Rogaland, Vestland
- Location: Gulatings plass 1, Bergen, Norway
- Coordinates: 60°23′31″N 5°19′39″E
- Composition method: Court of Appeal
- Appeals to: Supreme Court of Norway
- Appeals from: District courts
- Number of positions: 33
- Website: Official website

Chief Judge (Førstelagmann)
- Currently: Magni Elsheim

The Gulating Court of Appeal (Norwegian: Gulating lagmannsrett) is one of six courts of appeal in the Kingdom of Norway. The Court is located in the city of Bergen. The court has jurisdiction over the counties of Vestland and Rogaland plus Sirdal Municipality in Agder county. These areas constitute the Gulating judicial district (Norwegian: Gulating lagdømme). This court can rule on both civil and criminal cases that are appealed from one of its subordinate district courts. Court decisions can be, to a limited extent, appealed to the Supreme Court of Norway. There are 33 permanent judges seated on this court. The chief judicial officer of the court (Norwegian: førstelagmann) is currently Magni Elsheim (as of 2016). The court is administered by the Norwegian National Courts Administration.

== Location ==
The Court has its seat at Gulatings plass 1 in the city of Bergen, the largest city in Western Norway. The courthouse is located next to the Bergen city hall (Bergen rådhus). Additionally, the Court permanently sits in the city of Stavanger at the Stavanger Court House. The Court may also sit in other places within its jurisdiction as needed.

== Jurisdiction ==
This court accepts appeals from all of the district courts from its geographic jurisdiction. This court is divided into judicial regions (Norwegian: lagsogn) and there is one or more district courts (Norwegian: tingrett) that belongs to each of these regions.

Judicial Regions (lagsogner)	District courts (tingretter)
Rogaland	Haugaland og Sunnhordland District Court; Sør-Rogaland District Court
Vestland	Hordaland District Court; Hardanger og Voss District Court; Sogn og Fjordane District Court

== History ==
The court has its historical roots originating with the Gulating, one of the first Norwegian legislative assemblies or Þing, which was established before the year 900. This old assembly remained in operation until 1797 when the courts were changed. A new court law went into effect on 1 January 1890 which re-established the Gulating Court of Appeal which included all of Bergen, Søndre Bergenhus, Nordre Bergenhus, and Romsdalen counties. In 1892, some courts were consolidated and this court gained all of the county of Stavanger. On 1 January 1907, all of Trøndelag was added to the court as well, and at that time, the name of the court was changed to Gula- og Frostating Court of Appeal. On 1 July 1936, the northern part of the jurisdiction (Trøndelag and Møre og Romsdal) was separated to become the new Frostating Court of Appeal and the southern part continued as the Gulating Court of Appeal (using the old name again).

== See also ==
- Courts of Justice of Norway
