= Buskerud =

County in Eastern Norway

Buskerud County Buskerud fylke
- Former County
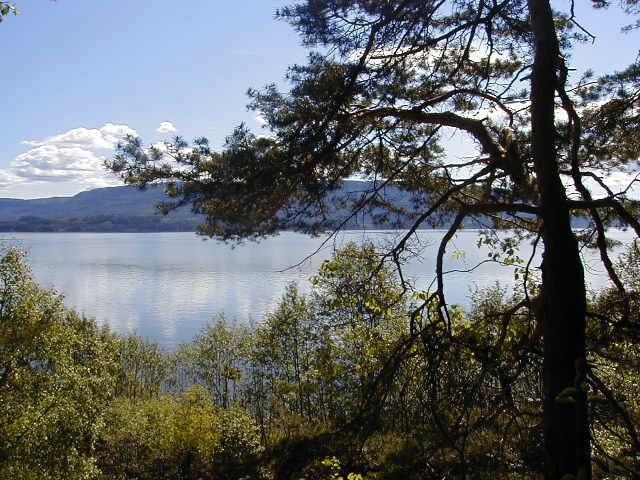
- Tyrifjorden, a lake in southern Ringerike

- Flag Coat of arms

- Buskerud within Norway
- Coordinates: 60°30′00″N 09°30′00″E
- Country: Norway
- County: Buskerud
- District: Østlandet
- Established: 1685
  - Preceded by: Akershus
- Disestablished: 1 Jan 2020
  - Succeeded by: Viken
- Re-established: 1 Jan 2024
  - Preceded by: Viken
- Administrative centre: Drammen

Government
  - Body: Buskerud County Municipality
  - Governor: Ingvild Aleksandersen
  - County mayor (2024): Tore Opdal Hansen (H)

Area (upon dissolution)
  - Total: 14,694.11 km^{2} (5,673.43 sq mi)
  - Land: 13,566.68 km^{2} (5,238.12 sq mi)
  - Water: 1,127.43 km^{2} (435.30 sq mi) 7.7%
  - Rank: #9 in Norway
- Highest elevation (Folarskardnuten): 1,933 m (6,342 ft)

Population (2026)
  - Total: 272.981
  - Rank: #10 in Norway
  - Density: 20.1/km^{2} (52/sq mi)
  - Change (10 years): ▼ −1.7%
- Demonym: Buskerudfolk

Official language
  - Norwegian form: Neutral
- Time zone: UTC+01:00 (CET)
  - Summer (DST): UTC+02:00 (CEST)
- ISO 3166 code: NO-33
- Income (per capita): 155,400 kr kr (2001)
- GDP (per capita): 227,626 kr kr (2001)
- GDP national rank: #7 in Norway (3.57% of country)
- Website: www.bfk.no

Buskerud (Urban East Norwegian pronunciation: [ˈbʉ̂skərʉː]) is a county in eastern Norway. The 14,694.11-square-kilometre (5,673.43 sq mi) county borders Akershus, Oslo, Innlandet, Vestland, Telemark, and Vestfold counties. It extends from the Drammensfjorden in the southeast to the Hardangervidda mountain range in the northwest. The administrative centre of the county is the city of Drammen.

Buskerud was one of the three counties merged into Viken county on 1 January 2020. On 23 February 2022, the Viken County Council voted 49–38 to submit an application to the Norwegian government to undo the 2020 merger. The Norwegian government agreed and on 1 January 2024, Buskerud county was re-established. The only difference was that the areas of the old Røyken Municipality and the old Hurum Municipality were not part of the re-established Buskerud because those areas had been merged with Asker Municipality and that area was part of Akershus county).

== History ==
Historical population
Year	Pop.	±%
1951	156,220	—
1961	168,351	+7.8%
1971	198,852	+18.1%
1981	214,571	+7.9%
1991	225,261	+5.0%
2001	238,833	+6.0%
2011	261,110	+9.3%
2024	269,819	+3.3%
Source: Statistics Norway.

Religion in Buskerud
religion	percent
Christianity	83.01%
Islam	3.14%
Buddhism	0.31%
Other	13.54%

Buskerud county was separated from Akershus county as an amt of its own in 1685, but the amt was smaller than today. It then consisted of the present-day districts of Eiker, Hallingdal, and Ringerike. The areas of Flesberg, Hurum, Kongsberg, Lier, Nore og Uvdal, Rollag, and Røyken were transferred from Akershus amt to Buskerud amt in 1760. The name Buskeruds amt was changed to Buskerud fylke in 1919. In 1964, the area of the old Skoger Municipality was transferred from Vestfold county to Buskerud county. On 1 January 2020, the areas of Røyken Municipality and Hurum Municipality became part of Asker Municipality. Also on 1 January 2020, Buskerud was one of the three counties merged into Viken county. On 23 February 2022, the Viken County Council voted 49–38 to submit an application to the Norwegian government to undo the 2020 merger. The Norwegian government agreed and on 1 January 2024, Buskerud county was re-established. The only difference was that the areas of the old Røyken Municipality and the old Hurum Municipality were not part of the re-established Buskerud because those areas had been merged with Asker Municipality and that area was part of Akershus county).

The area Ringerike may once have been a small kingdom. During the 10th century, Norway's kings Olaf Tryggvason and Olaf Haraldsson grew up at Bønsnes in Ringerike. In the valley of Numedal, silver was mined in Kongsberg from the 17th century until discontinued in 1957. Weapons industry had been developed in Kongsberg from 1814, and various high tech industry companies now represent the town's major employers. In Modum Municipality there was also Blaafarveværket, a cobalt pigment production works (Blue Colour Works).

=== Etymology ===
The county was named after the old Buskerud Manor (Old Norse: Biskupsruð) (Biskopsrøysa) located on the west side of the Drammen River in Åmot in Modum Municipality. The first element is the genitive case of biskup which means "bishop" (referring to the Bishop of Hamar). The last element is ruð which means a "clearing for a farm". The farm was one of the largest in Buskerud, and the original name of the farm (before it became a benefice) was probably Modum. At the time of the Reformation (c. 1536–39) the farm became property of the Crown at which time the farm then served as the residence of the king's bailiffs until 1668.

=== Coat of arms ===
Buskerud's coat of arms were adopted in April 1966. It features a blue bear whose colours are symbolic of the blue colour works. The silver background of Buskerud's coat of arms represents the silver industry in Kongsberg.

== Economy ==
Agriculture, lumber, wood-pulp mills, and other related industries are the county's main economic activities. There is also ample hydroelectric power is produced by the rivers Begna and Randselva. Buskerud has also a large forested area. Substantial income is derived from high tech industries located in Kongsberg. Other significant income comes from the cabin areas in northern Buskerud. The company, Eneas Energy is based here.

== Geography ==
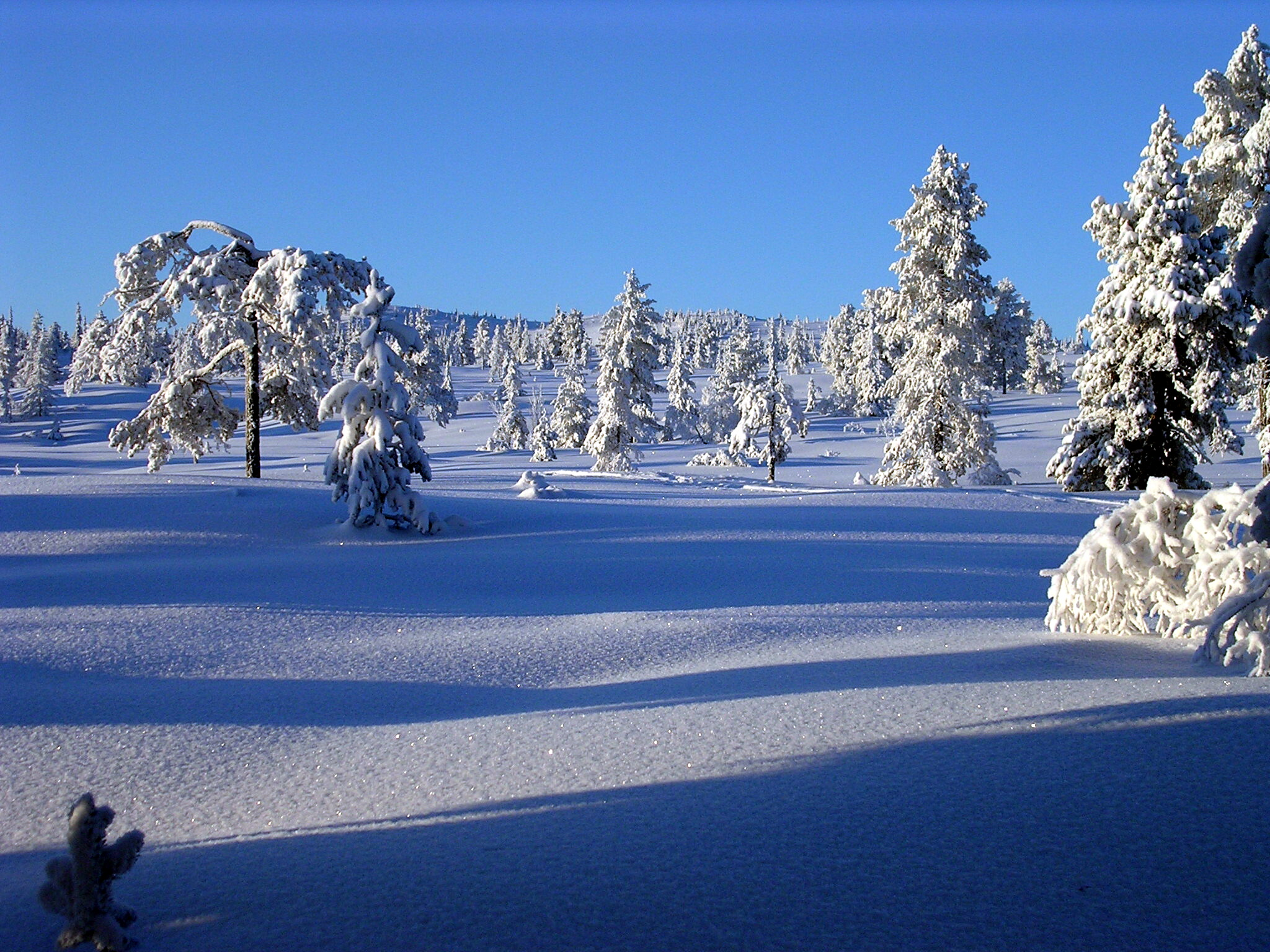
Winter in Blefjell

Buskerud county extends from the lake Tyrifjorden and the Drammensfjorden in the east to the Hallingskarvet mountains and the Hardangervidda plateau in the west. The county is conventionally divided into several traditional districts. These are Hallingdal, Numedal, Ringerike, and Lower Buskerud, which was originally part of Vestfold.

Today, the district of Hallingdal consists of Flå Municipality, Nesbyen Municipality, Gol Municipality, Hemsedal Municipality, Ål Municipality, and Hol Municipality. The district of Numedal consists of Flesberg Municipality, Rollag Municipality and Nore og Uvdal Municipality. The district of Ringerike consists of Hole Municipality, Krødsherad Municipality, Modum Municipality, Ringerike Municipality, and Sigdal Municipality. The district of Lower Buskerud consists of Drammen Municipality, Kongsberg Municipality, Lier Municipality, and Øvre Eiker Municipality.

Buskerud county's western parts are a mountainous plateau with forested valleys and high, grassy pastures; its eastern parts contains a lowland basin with many lakes and streams. Tyrifjorden and Krøderen are the largest lakes. Numedalslågen, the third longest river in Norway, starting in Vestland county, runs through Buskerud into Vestfold where it reaches the sea, while the river Begna sweeps into the lake Sperillen.

=== Mountains ===
Some of the notable mountains in Buskerud include:

- Haukefjellet
- Hestebottnuten
- Julsennuten
- Kyrkjebønosi
- Nystølsvarden
- Øljunuten
- Raggsteinnuten
- Skimtheia
- Storebottnosi
- Storegrønut
- Tyrvlesnuten
- Vargebreen

== Subdivisions ==
=== Municipalities ===
Municipalities in Buskerud

Nr	Name	Population (2026)	Area km^{2}
3301	Drammen Municipality	106,013	317.67
3303	Kongsberg Municipality	29,169	793.09
3305	Ringerike Municipality	31,942	1,555.1
3310	Hole Municipality	7,205	192.68
3312	Lier Municipality	28,797	301.83
3314	Øvre Eiker Municipality	20,965	456.76
3316	Modum Municipality	14,776	517.24
3318	Krødsherad Municipality	2,276	374.53
3320	Flå Municipality	1,122	704.24
3322	Nesbyen Municipality	3,234	809.63
3324	Gol Municipality	4,902	532.5
3326	Hemsedal Municipality	2,707	753.51
3328	Ål Municipality	5,106	1,174.98
3330	Hol Municipality	4,552	1,854.54
3332	Sigdal Municipality	3,514	842.46
3334	Flesberg Municipality	2,790	561.91
3336	Rollag Municipality	1,452	449.28
3338	Nore og Uvdal Municipality	2,459	2,502.16
Total	Buskerud	272,981	14,694.11

=== Districts ===
- Eiker
- Eggedal
- Hallingdal
- Hurumlandet
- Jondalen
- Numedal
- Ringerike
- Lower Buskerud
- Kjenner
- Klokkarstua

=== Cities ===
- Drammen
- Hønefoss
- Kongsberg
- Hokksund
- Svelvik

=== Parishes ===
- Bakke
- Bragernes
- Dagali
- Drammen
- Efteløt
- Eggedal
- Eiker
- Fiskum
- Flesberg
- Flå
- Frogner
- Gol
- Haug, see Eiker
- Haug i Norderhov
- Hedenstad
- Heggen
- Hemsedal
- Hol
- Hole
- Holmen
- Holmsbu
- Hval
- Hønefoss
- Jondalen
- Komnes
- Kongsberg
- Krødsherad (Krydsherred)
- Lier
- Lunder
- Lyngdal
- Modum
- Nedre Eiker
- Nes (i Hallingdal)
- Nes (i Ådal)
- Norderhov
- Nore
- Nykirke
- Opdal
- Rollag
- Sandsvær
- Sigdal (Holem)
- Snarum
- Sollihøgda
- Strømsø
- Svene
- Sylling
- Tangen
- Torpo
- Tranby
- Tuft
- Tyristrand
- Uvdal
- Veggli
- Viker
- Ytre Ådal
- Ådal
- Ål
- Drammen Branch (LDS, 1854–1952)
- Drammen (Den Katolske Apostoliske Menighet, 1877–1935)
- Drammen and Oslo (Den Katolske Apostoliske Menighet, 1872–1932)
- Hurum Branch (LDS, 1855–1867)
- Kongsberg Branch (LDS, 1939–1948* )

=== Villages ===
- Ask
- Askgrenda
- Burud
- Bødalen
- Båtstø
- Dagali
- Dagslett
- Darbu
- Dramdal
- Drolsum
- Efteløt
- Egge
- Filtvet
- Gardnos
- Geilo
- Geithus
- Gomnes
- Gulsvik
- Hagafoss
- Hallingby
- Haugastøl
- Haugsbygd
- Helgelandsmoen
- Hen
- Hennummarka
- Holmsbu
- Hovet
- Hønefoss
- Hval
- Hvittingfoss
- Hyggen
- Kjenner
- Klokkarstua
- Konnerud
- Krokstadelva
- Kroksund
- Krøderen
- Kvisla
- Lahell
- Lampeland
- Lierbyen
- Lierskogen
- Lierstranda
- Mjøndalen
- Midtbygda
- Nakkerud
- Nedre Eggedal
- Nes, Ådal
- Nesbyen
- Nore
- Noresund
- Nærsnes
- Oddevall
- Ormåsen
- Ovenstadlia
- Prestfoss
- Reistad
- Rollag
- Rødberg
- Sjåstad
- Skoger
- Skollenborg
- Skotselv
- Slemmestad
- Sokna
- Solbergelva
- Sollihøgda
- Spikkestad
- Steinberg
- Steinsåsen
- Storsand
- Sundvollen
- Svene
- Sylling
- Sysle
- Sætre
- Tofte
- Torpo
- Tronstad
- Tyristrand
- Ustaoset
- Uvdal
- Veggli
- Vestbygda
- Vestfossen
- Vik
- Vikersund
- Åmot
- Åros
- Åsa
- Åsbygda

=== Former municipalities ===
- Eiker Municipality
- Hønefoss
- Norderhov Municipality
- Nore Municipality
- Sandsvær Municipality
- Skoger Municipality
- Strømm Municipality
- Strømsgodset Municipality
- Tyristrand Municipality
- Uvdal Municipality
- Ytre Sandsvær Municipality
- Øvre Sandsvær Municipality
- Ådal Municipality

== Gallery ==
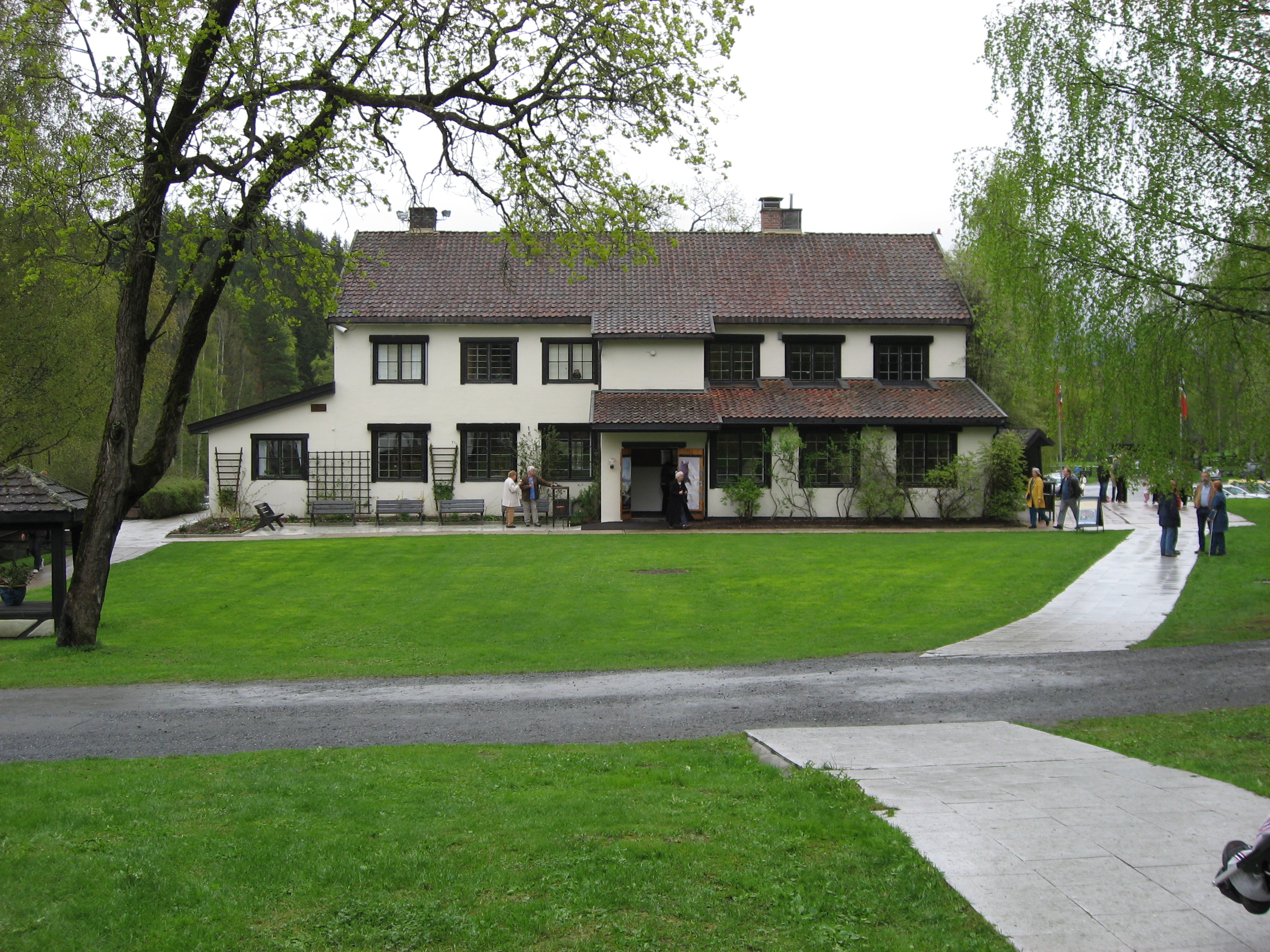
Blaafarveværket in Modum

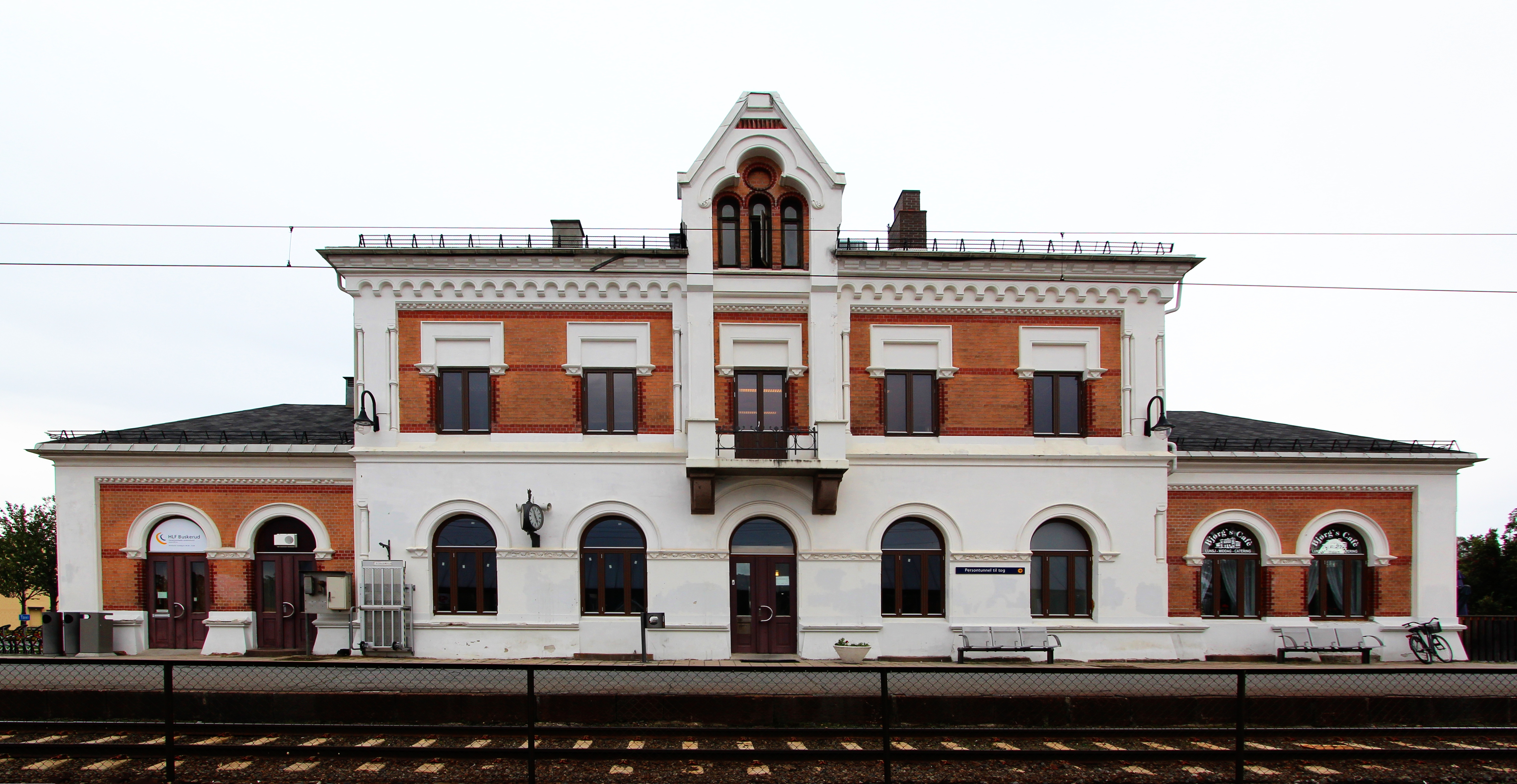
Hokksund Station

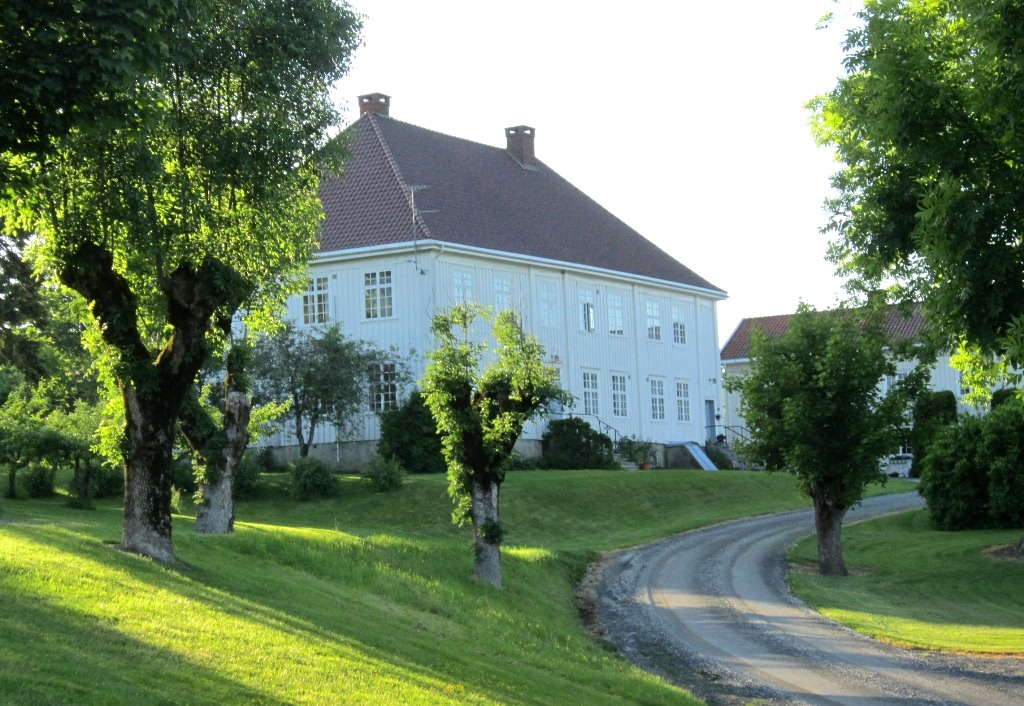
Frogner Rectory in Lier

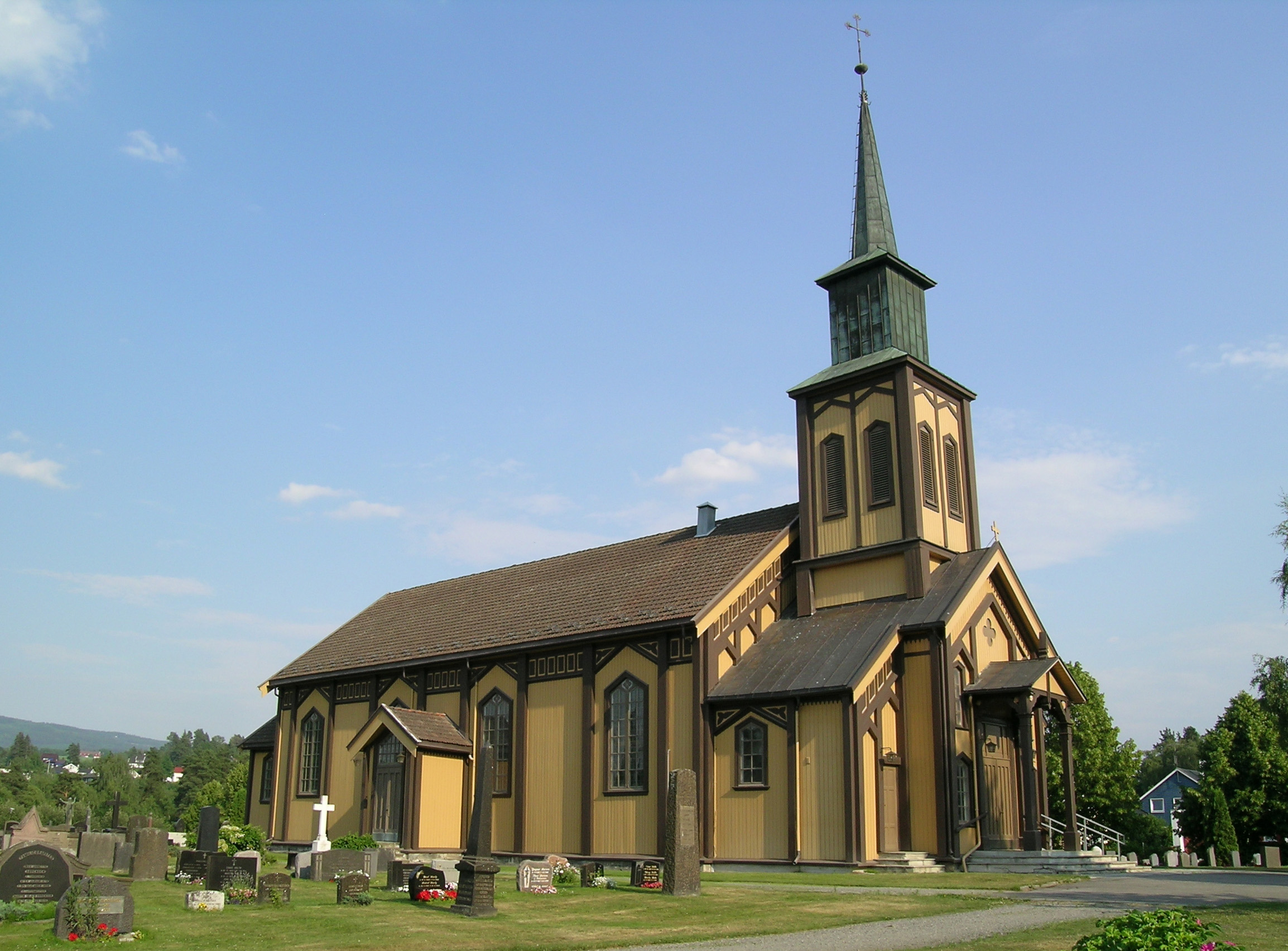
Hønefoss Church in Ringerike, burned down 2007.

== Notable people ==
=== Sports figures ===
- Frode Andresen, from Ringerike Municipality
- Dag Bjørndalen, from Modum Municipality
- Ole Einar Bjørndalen, from Modum Municipality
- Håvard Bøkko, from Hol Municipality
- Kim Christiansen, from Drammen Municipality
- Ole Gunnar Fidjestøl, from Modum Municipality
- Tord Asle Gjerdalen, from Hole Municipality
- Erik Hagen, from Ringerike Municipality
- Anders Jacobsen, from Ringerike Municipality
- Jørre Kjemperud, from Modum Municipality
- Pål Gunnar Mikkelsplass, from Nesbyen Municipality
- Børre Næss, from Kongsberg Municipality
- Sigurd Pettersen, from Rollag Municipality
- Steinar Pettersen, from Drammen Municipality
- Asbjørn Ruud, from Kongsberg Municipality
- Birger Ruud, from Kongsberg Municipality
- Sigmund Ruud, from Kongsberg Municipality
- Strømsgodset IF, a sports teach from Gulskogen, Drammen Municipality
- Ådne Søndrål, from Hol Municipality
- Martin Ødegaard, from Drammen Municipality

=== Entertainers ===
- Sæbjørn Buttedahl, from Lier Municipality
- Karin Fossum, from Lier Municipality
- Morten Harket, from Kongsberg Municipality
- Theodor Kittelsen, from Sigdal Municipality
- Jonas Lie, from Modum Municipality
- Jørgen Moe, from Hole Municipality
- Anne Marie Ottersen, from Kongsberg Municipality
- Olav Thon, from Ål Municipality
- Christian Skredsvig, from Sigdal Municipality
- Jonas Fjeld, from Drammen Municipality
- Elin Sogn, from Kongsberg Municipality
- Ørjan Burøe, Hol Municipality [Knud Bjørnson] [Bjørn Eriksen)

=== Politicians ===
- Thorbjørn Jagland, from Drammen Municipality
