= Gullaug =

Unincorporated village in Lier, Buskerud, Norway

Coordinates: 59°44′23.7″N 10°17′14.5″E

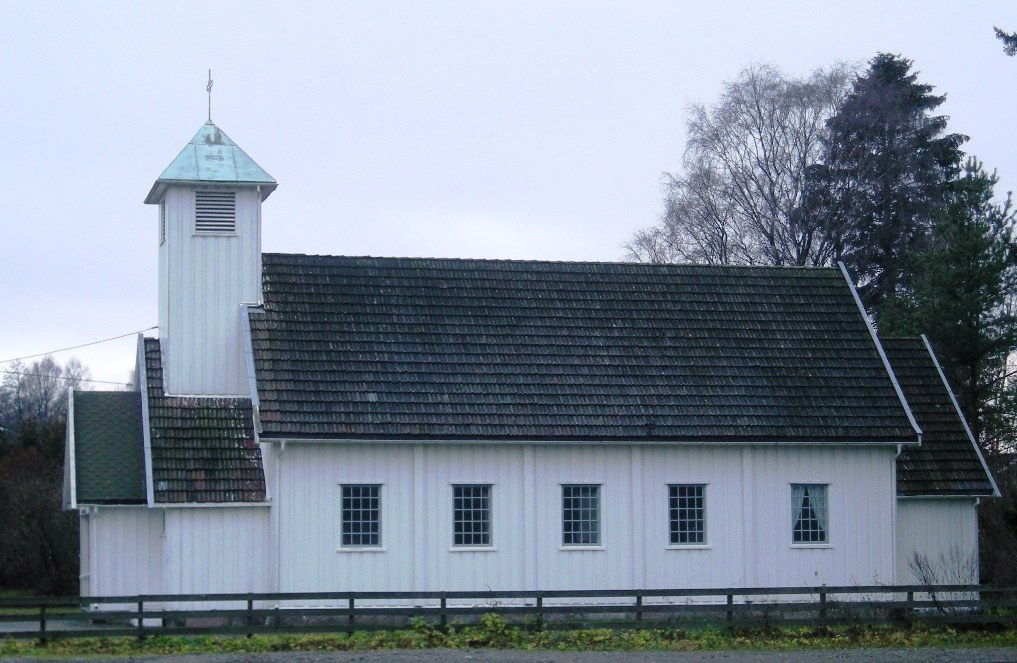
Gullaug Church

Gullaug is an unincorporated village at Lier municipality in Buskerud, Norway.

Gullaug is located between Lierbyen, Røyken and Drammen. Geographically, Gullaug is an area that encompasses little more than a small commercial area and local shops, but locals apply the label to the entire area stretching from Lierkroa in the north, Lahell in the south, Amtmandsvingen in the west and Spikkestad in the east. This is the area that is served by the Gullaug school.

Gullaug Church (Gullaug kirke) in Frogner parish dates from 1905 and was constructed of wood. It has seating for 100 people. Gullaug holdeplass was a railroad stop on the Drammen Line. It opened in 1956 and closed in 1973 when Lieråsen Tunnel opened and the rail line was shortened. The old railway line in the area have been converted into cycle path and located in a popular hiking area.

Most of the buildings at Gullaug were built in connection with the former Norwegian industrial group, Norsk Sprængstofindustris which was founded in 1917. Norsk Sprængstofindustris was an amalgamation of several companies, operated locally as Gullaug Factories, which concentrated on the production of civilian and military explosives. In 1971, Norsk Sprængstofindustri and Grubernes Sprængstoffabriker were merged into Dyno Industrier ASA (now Dyno Nobel), a large industrial explosives manufacturers with interests in plastic and chemical production.
