= Sætre, Asker =

Coordinates: 59°40′47″N 010°31′03″E

Sætre
- Village
- Interactive map of Sætre
- Country: Norway
- Region: Østlandet
- County: Akershus
- Municipality: Asker
- Time zone: UTC+01:00 (CET)
  - Summer (DST): UTC+02:00 (CEST)
- Post Code: 3475 Sætre

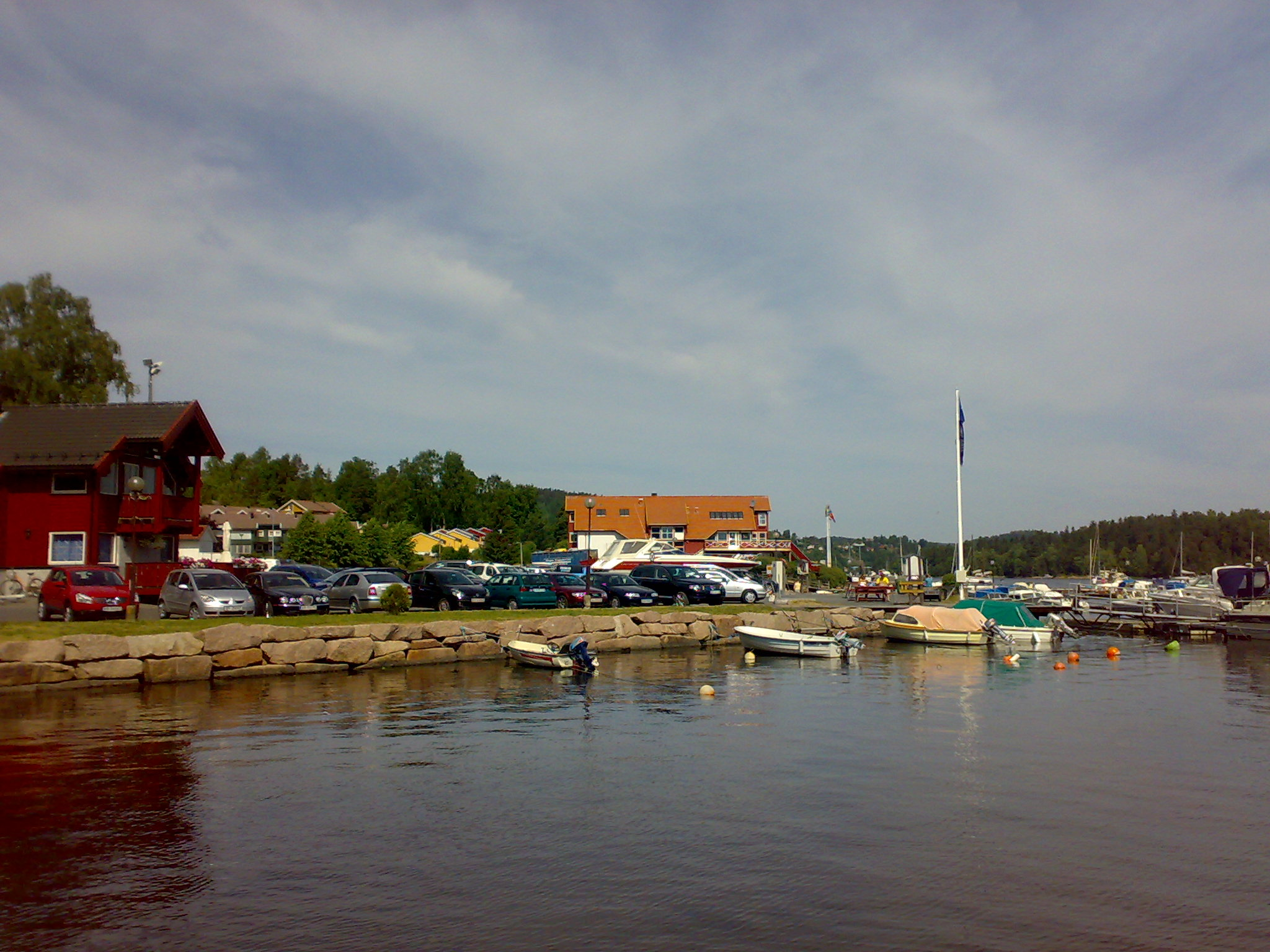
Sætre in Asker, Norway

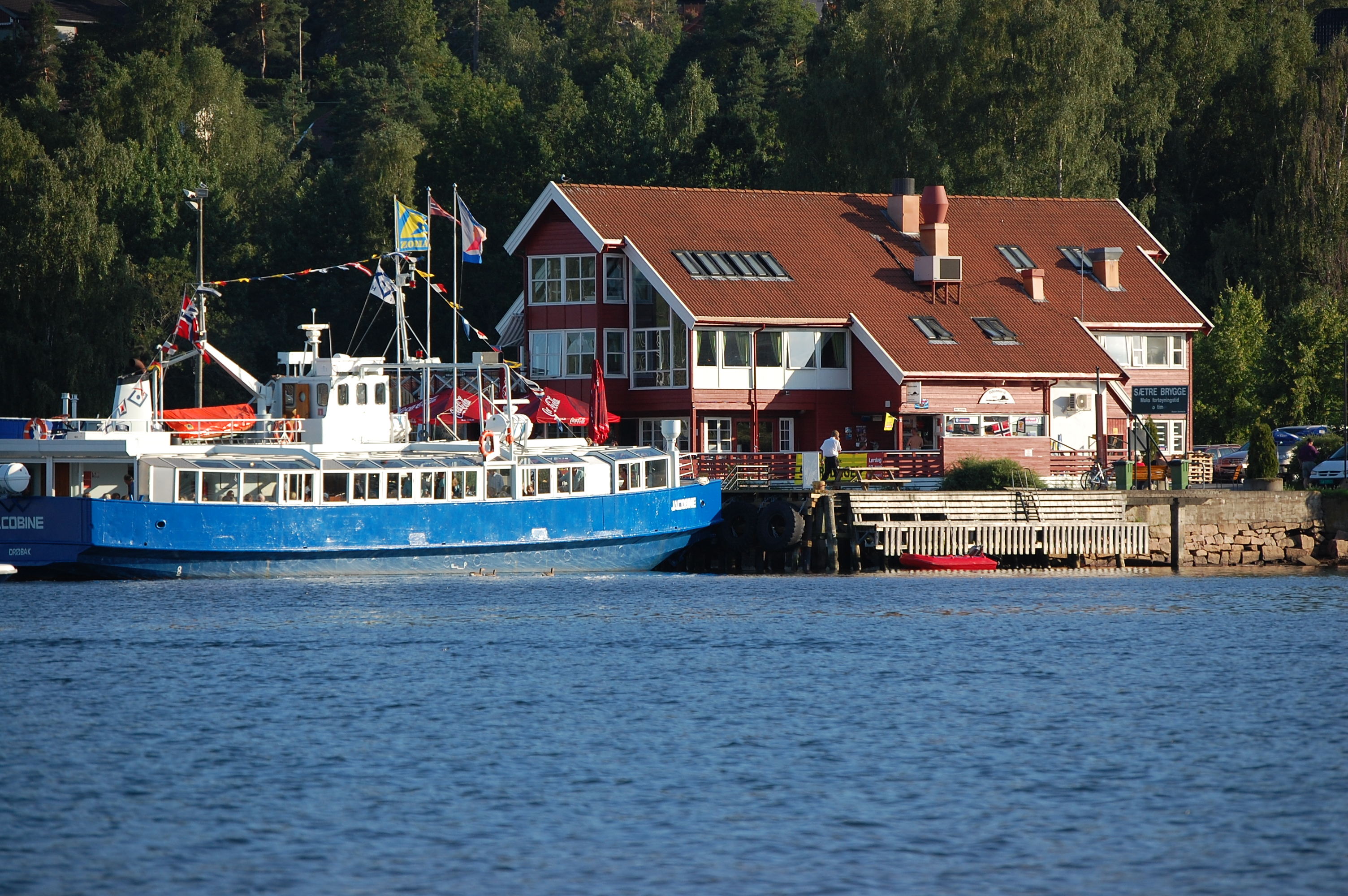
Sætre Marina

Sætre is a village in Asker municipality in Akershus county, Norway. Sætre is situated on the western bank of the Inner Oslofjord, approximately 45 kilometers south of Oslo.

Sætre was the administrative centre of the former municipality of Hurum in Buskerud between 2012 and 1 January 2020. The village had a population of 3796 as of 1 January 2019. Sætre was the most populous village in the former municipality of Hurum.

== Name ==
The name Sætre (/ˈse:tɾe/) is derived from the Norse word 'sétrar' which is the plural form of the word 'sétr'. 'Sétrar' literally means 'place to sit' which can be understood as meaning 'place of residence'. The first known instance of the name being used is in a letter dating from 1330.

== Geography ==
The village is located on a peninsula known as Hurumlandet, situated between the Oslofjord to the east and the Drammensfjord to the west. Sætre is also home to the Sætreelva (Sætre River) which plays an important role in the regional watercourses. The river has a watershed of approximately 20 square kilometers and releases 11 million cubic meters of water in the fjord every year.

== Nature ==
The Sætre River is an important breeding ground for sea trout. As of 2014 the water quality has been denoted as good. The river is incredibly susceptible to human influence and is negatively affected by things such as littering. The river was also negatively affected by the development of Sætre Nærsenter (Sætre Shopping Centre) around 2010.

The wetlands known as Øra just south of the mouth of the Sætre River is an important wetlands area for multiple species of birds. The islets outside of Sætre are also important breeding grounds for numerous species of seabirds.

== Industry ==
Sætre was the site of Norsk Sprængsofindustri, a manufacturing plant owned and operated by Dyno Nobel which produced explosives for civil and military usage. The factory was founded in 1876 after a plant at Lysaker outside Oslo exploded two years earlier. Both plants were built by Alfred Nobel who had an ownership interests in them. In 2005, the plant at Sætre was sold to Orica, an Australian-based multinational corporation. After the sale, explosives production was discontinued at the site. Engene Explosives Historic Industrial Museum (Engene Sprengstoffhistoriske Industrimuseum) was established on the site in 1983. The explosives historical museum was closed in 2007, based principally on safety concerns. At present, the museum site is temporarily protected.

The newspaper Røyken og Hurums Avis has been published in Sætre since 2003.

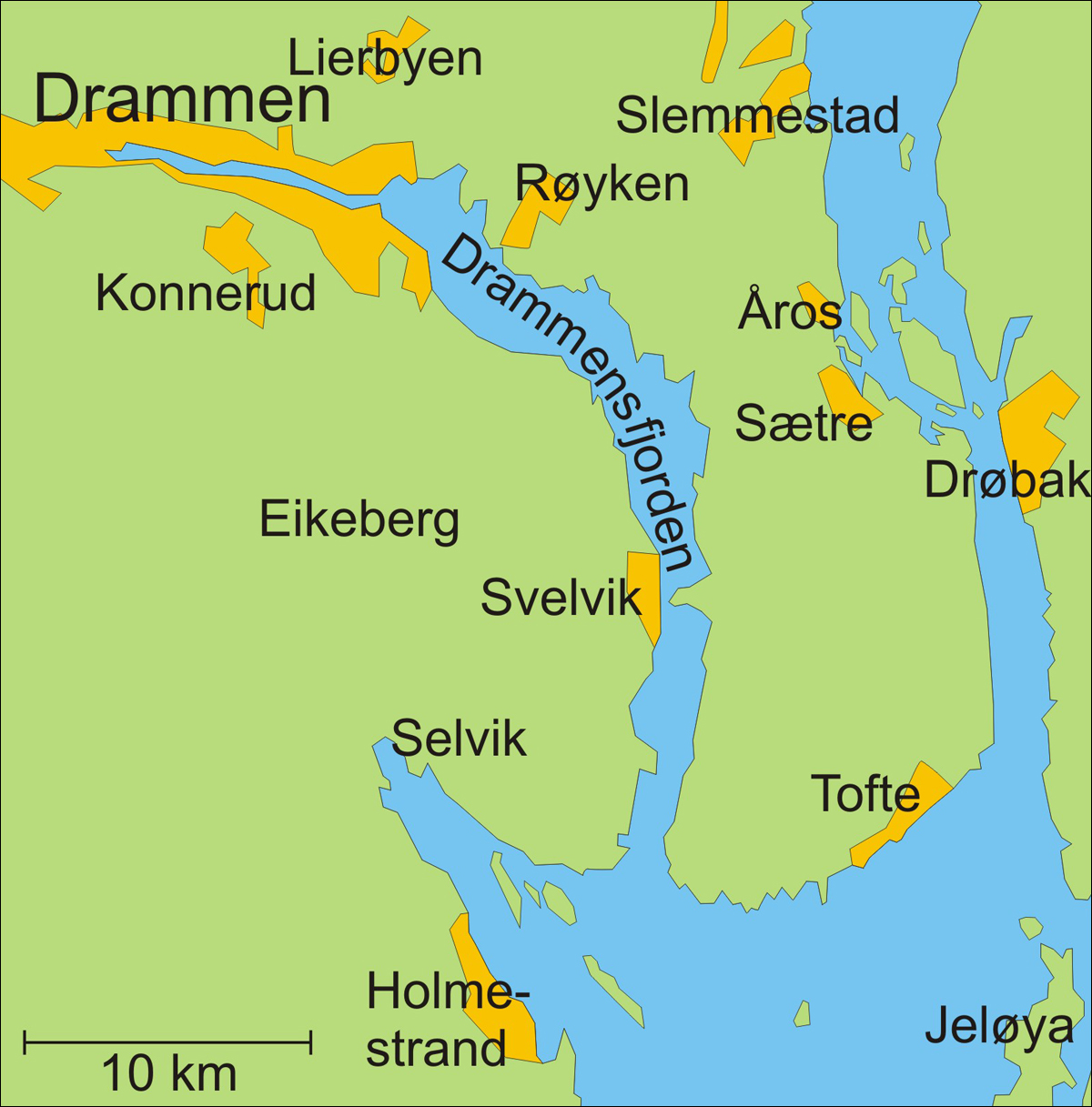
Sætre on Oslofjord
