= Drolsum =

Village in Buskerud, Norway

Coordinates: 60°01′N 10°02′E

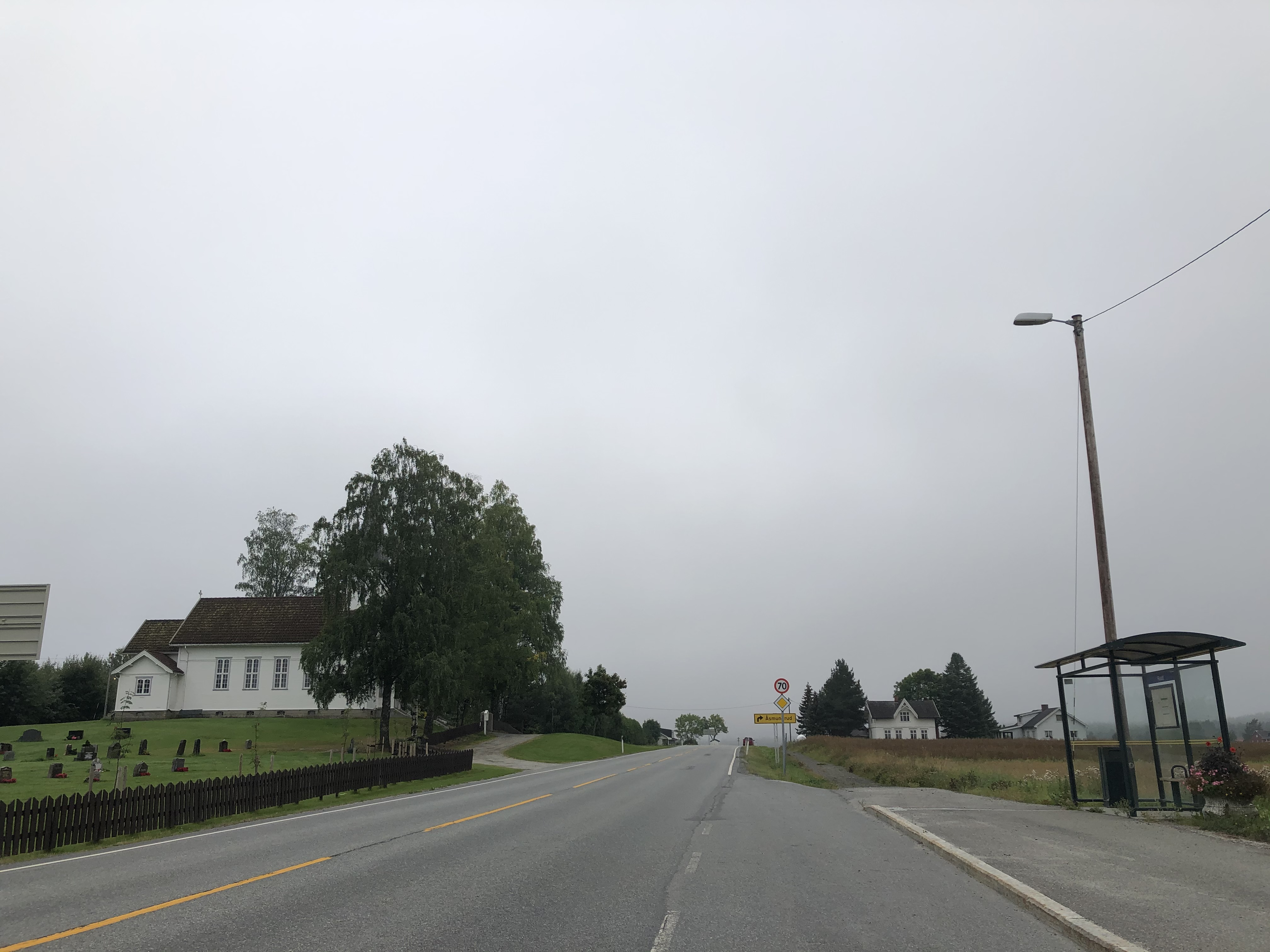
Modum municipality

Drolsum is a small village in Modum municipality in Buskerud, Norway.

Drolsum is located on the western bank of Tyrifjorden on Norwegian county road 35 (Fv 35) which runs between Langebru in Øvre Eiker and Tønsberg in Vestfold. Drolsum had a train station (Drolsum stoppestedon) in the Randsfjordbanen between Vikersund and Nakkerud. The rail station was opened during 1903.The original station building was demolished and replaced with a new office in 1946. Around 1973 it downgraded to stop. It is listed on the Norwegian National Rail Administration Network and is not officially closed. [1]
