= Klokkarstua =

Village in Asker Municipality, Norway

Coordinates: 59°36′50″N 10°27′35″E

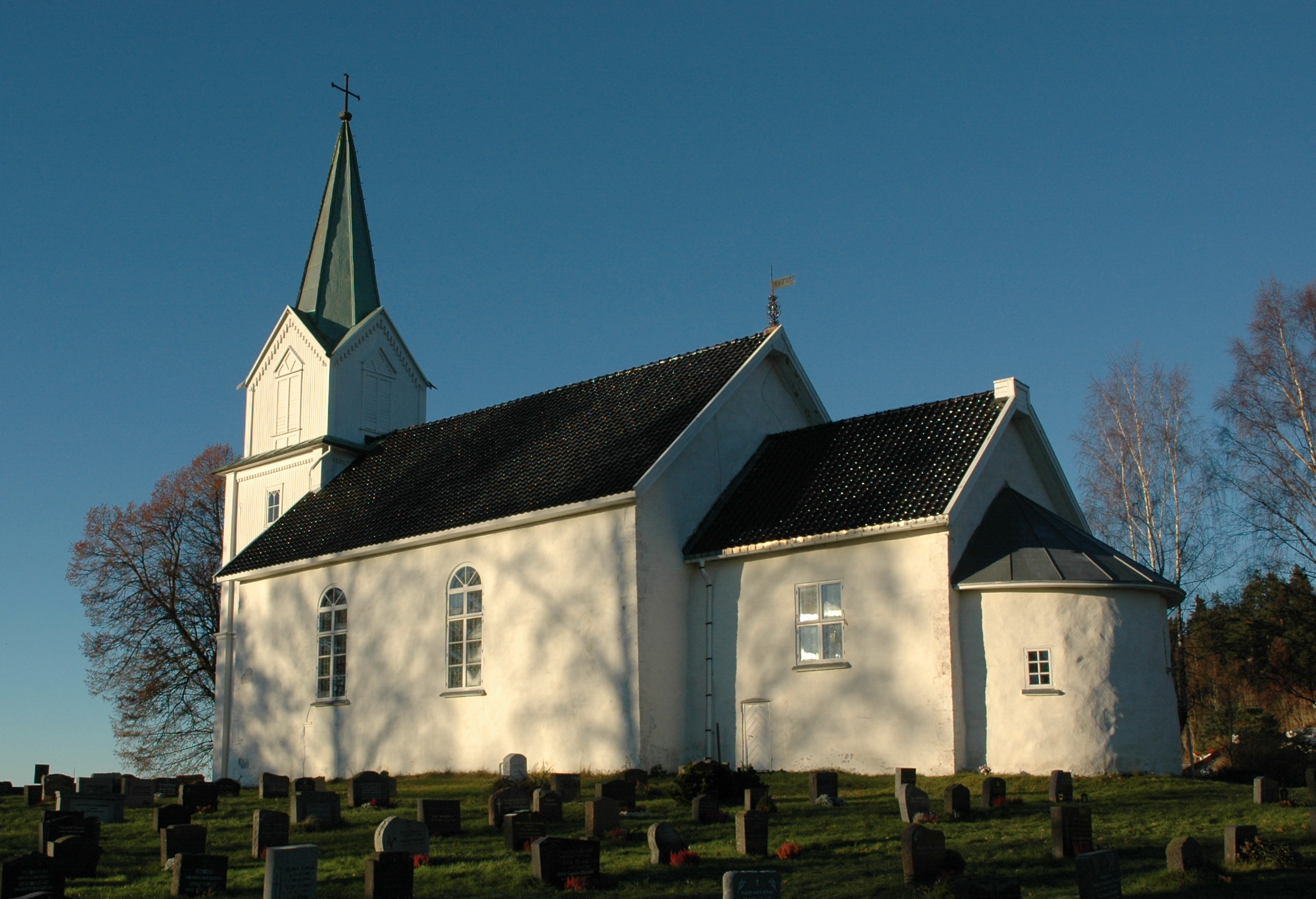
Hurum Church

Klokkarstua is a village in Asker municipality in Akershus county, Norway. It is located on the southern part of Hurumlandet, the peninsula between the Oslofjord and Drammensfjord.
