= Lahell =

- Village
- Interactive map of Lahell
- Coordinates: 59°43′33″N 10°18′50″E
- Time zone: UTC+01:00 (CET)

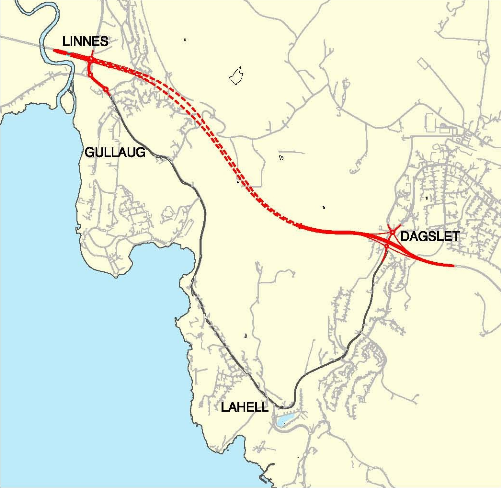
Lahell is located on RV23 between Dagslett and Gullaug

Lahell is a village in the municipality of Lier in Buskerud, Norway.

Located in the south of the municipality of Lier, southwest of Spikkestad in Røyken, it is neighbouring to the urban area Drammen which bordering to Lier. Norwegian National Road 23 (Rv23) carries heavy volume of transport and commuter traffic through the neighborhood connecting it with the municipalities of Lier, Røyken, Hurum and Frogn.

Large parts of the population settled in Lahelle in connection with explosives producer Dyno Industrier ASA (now Dyno Nobel). Production of explosives has now moved and community planning proposes building a new and modern hospital on part of the former site. Lahelle is today primarily a residential area. The part of the Drammen urban area that stretches into Lier has a population of 4,788.
