= Reistad (surname) =

Reistad is a surname. Notable people with the surname include:

- Henny Reistad (born 1999), Norwegian handball player
- Ole Reistad (1898–1949), Norwegian military officer and athlete
- Petter Reistad (born 1994), Norwegian cross-country skier

== See also ==
- Reistad
