= Nystølsvarden =

Mountain in Gol, Norway

Coordinates: 60°45′20″N 9°12′51″E

Highest point
- Elevation: 1,295.4 m (4,250 ft)
- Prominence: 458.4 to 458.6 m (1,504 to 1,505 ft)
- Isolation: 30.6 km (19.0 mi) to Skogshorn

Geography
- Location: Buskerud, Norway

Nystølsvarden is a mountain of Gol municipality, Buskerud, in southern Norway. It is the highest point in Gol.
