= Åsbygda =

Village in Ringerike Municipality, Norway

Coordinates: 60°12′15″N 10°22′23″E

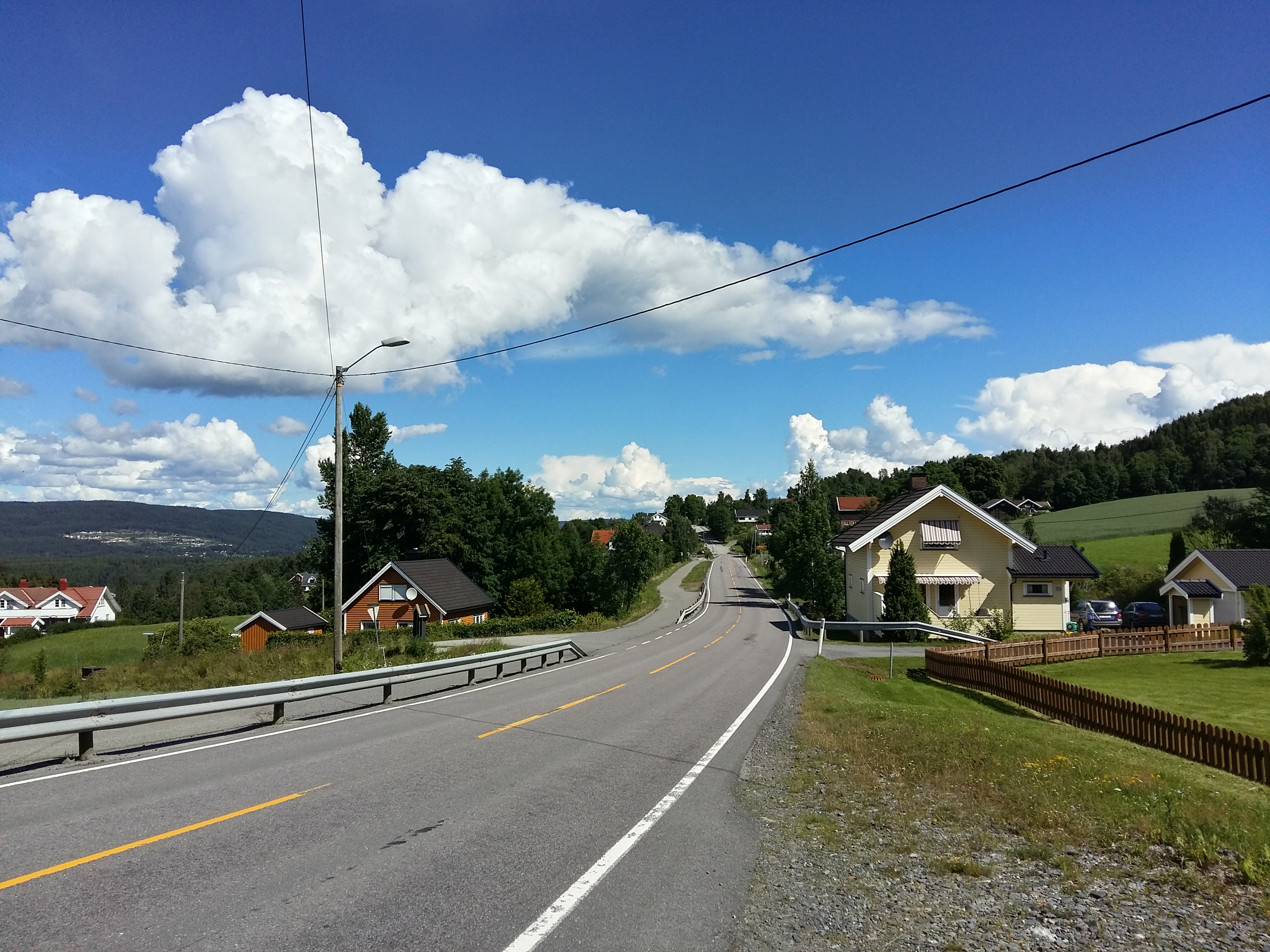
Åsbygda

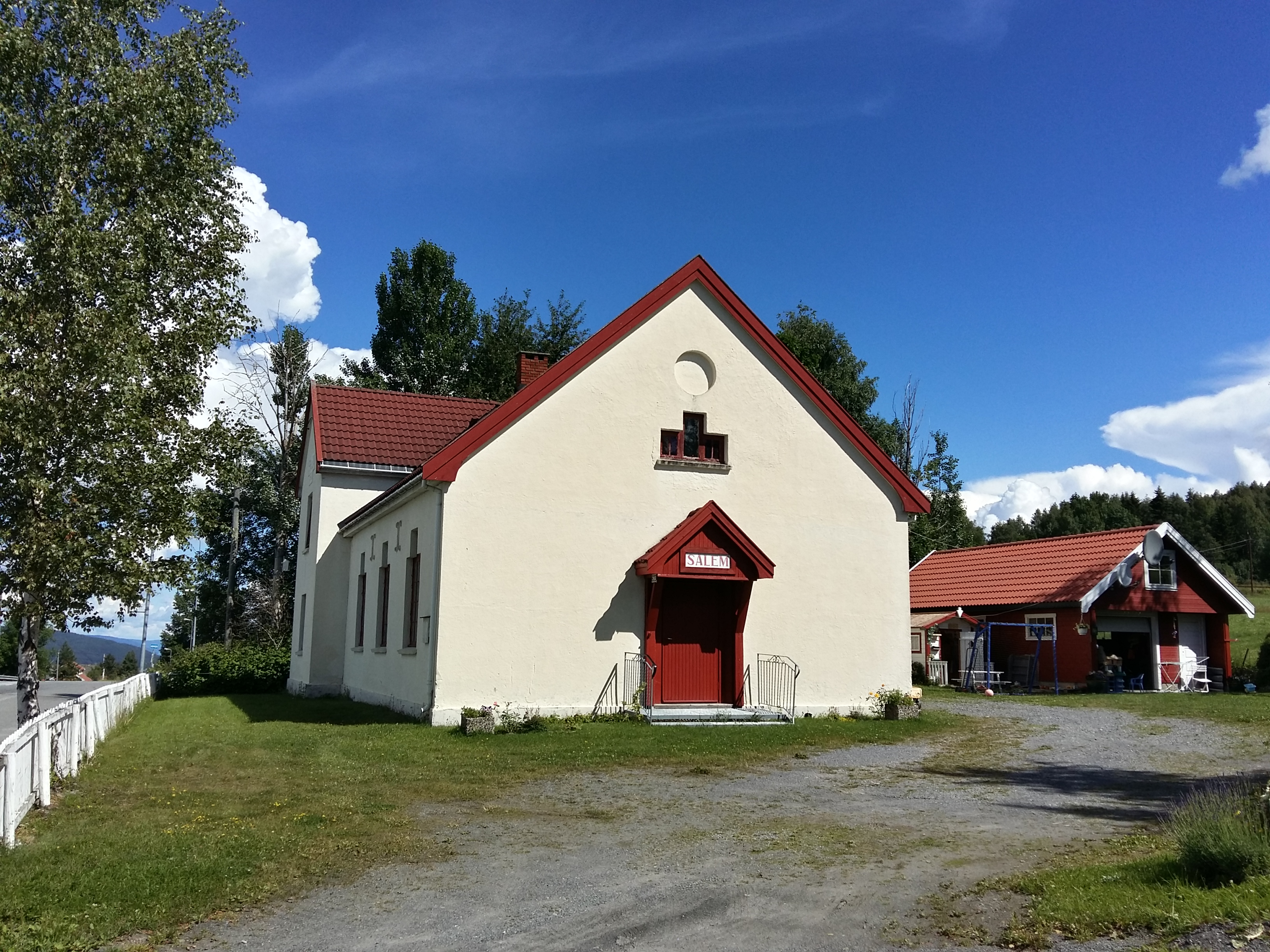
Salemkirken

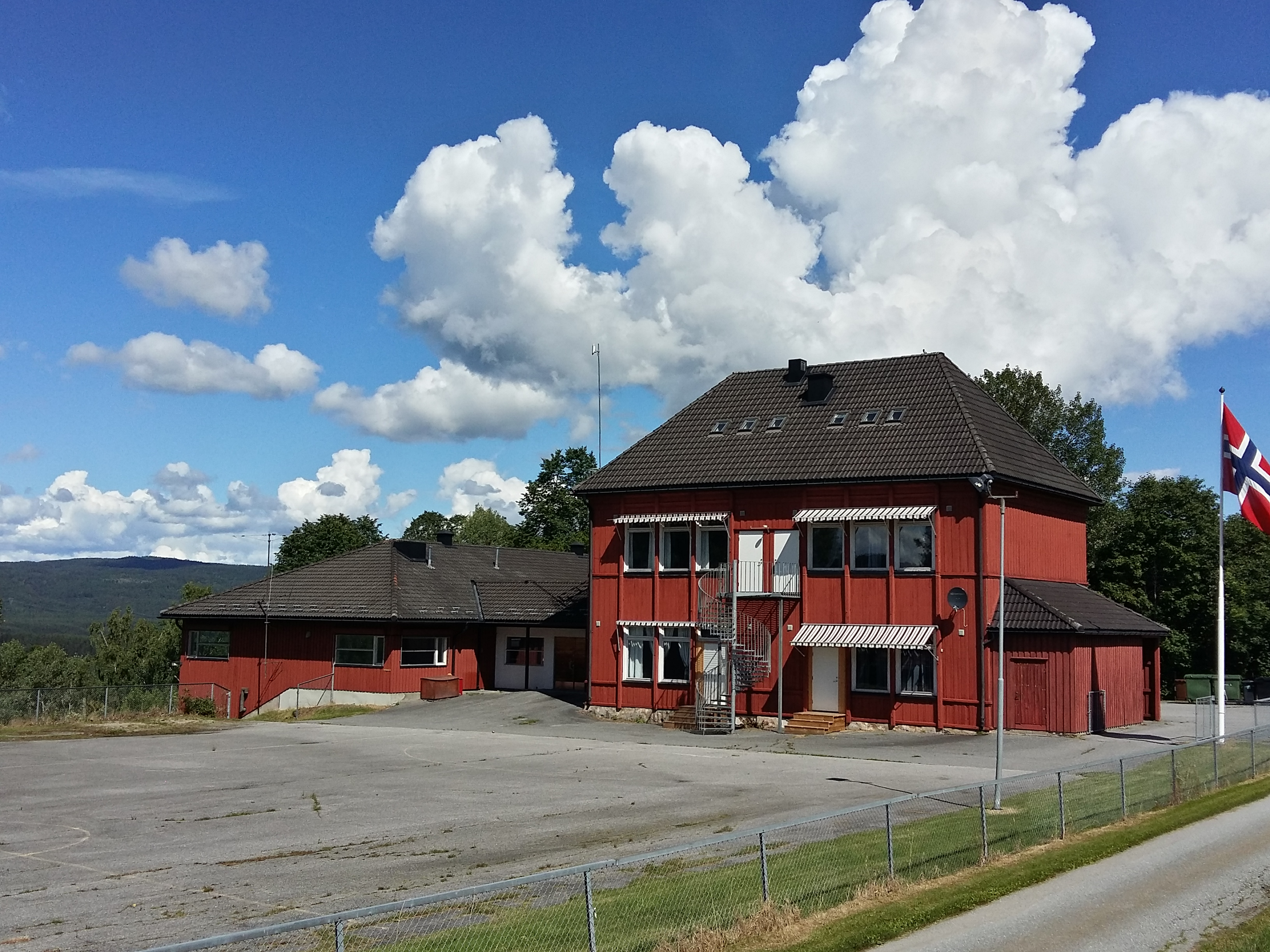
Åsbygda school

Åsbygda is a small village in Ringerike municipality of Buskerud, Norway.

Åsbygda can be said to include the areas along the Randselva river, down towards the village of Viul and north to the county border at Jevnaker on the Randsfjorden in Oppland. This area experienced hard treatment during World War II, with several fierce battles conducted here. Åsbygda school was shut down at the end in June 2007.
