= Skimtheia =

Mountain in Norway

Coordinates: 59°48′16″N 10°08′11″E

Highest point
- Elevation: 554 m (1,818 ft)

Geography
- Location: Buskerud, Norway

Skimtheia is a mountain on the border of Drammen and Lier municipalities in Buskerud county in southern Norway. The highest point is 554 metre above sea level.
