= Sysle =

Village in Modum municipality, Norway

Coordinates: 59.9889°N 9.91889°E

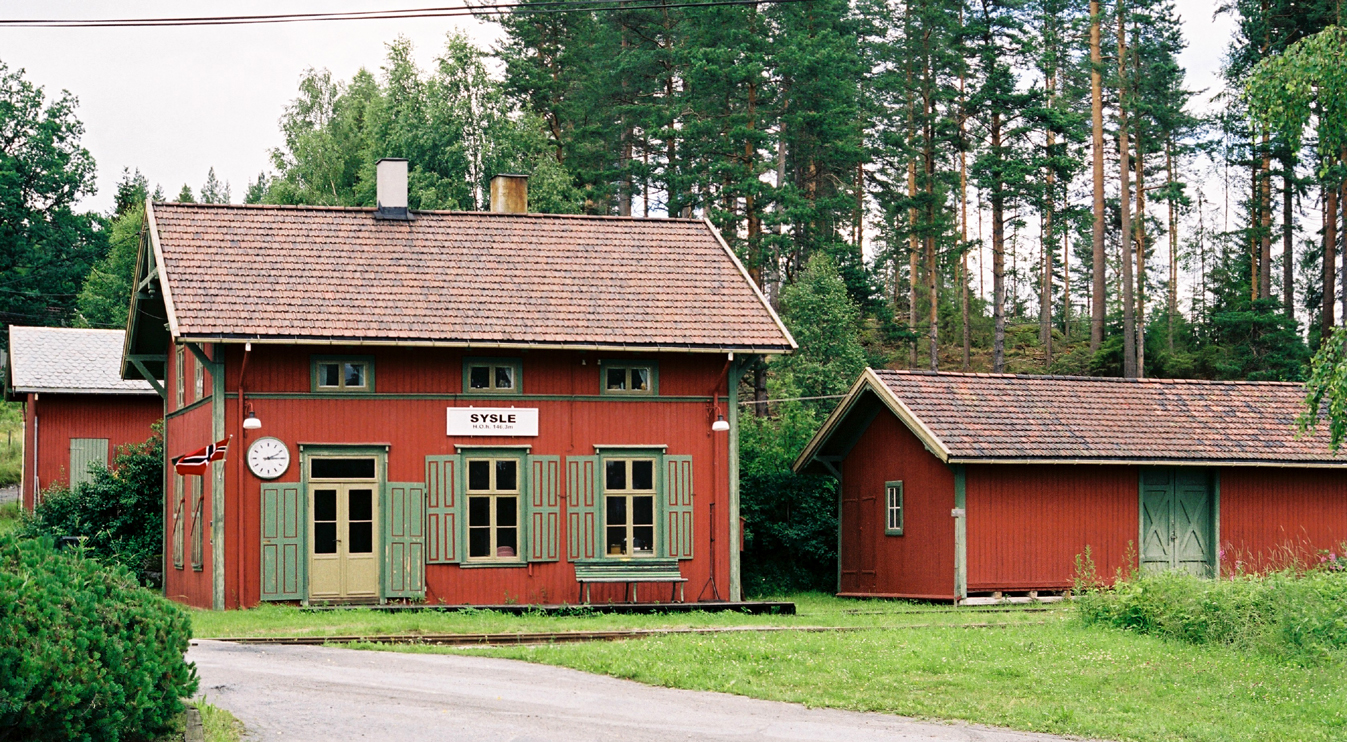
Sysle Rail Station

Sysle is a village in the municipality of Modum, Buskerud county, Norway. Its population (2014) is 227.

Sysle is principally a residential area situated about six km northwest of Vikersund. It is located on Norwegian National Road 280 (Riksvei 280). The village is situated on the Snarumselva, a continuation of the Hallingdalselva which flows from Lake Krøderen.

There was a rail stop on the Krøderbanen railway line which runs from Vikersund to Krøderen. Sysle station opened in 1872. In 1958, passenger traffic was shut down and Sysle was reclassified as a freight station. Freight traffic ended in 1985.
