= Hestebottnuten =

Mountain in Norway

Coordinates: 60.8718°N 8.1173°E

Geography
- Location: Buskerud, Norway

Hestebottnuten is a mountain of Ål municipality, Buskerud, in southern Norway.
