= Raggsteinnuten =

Mountain in Norway

Coordinates: 60°38′31″N 7°45′43″E

Geography
- Location: Buskerud, Norway

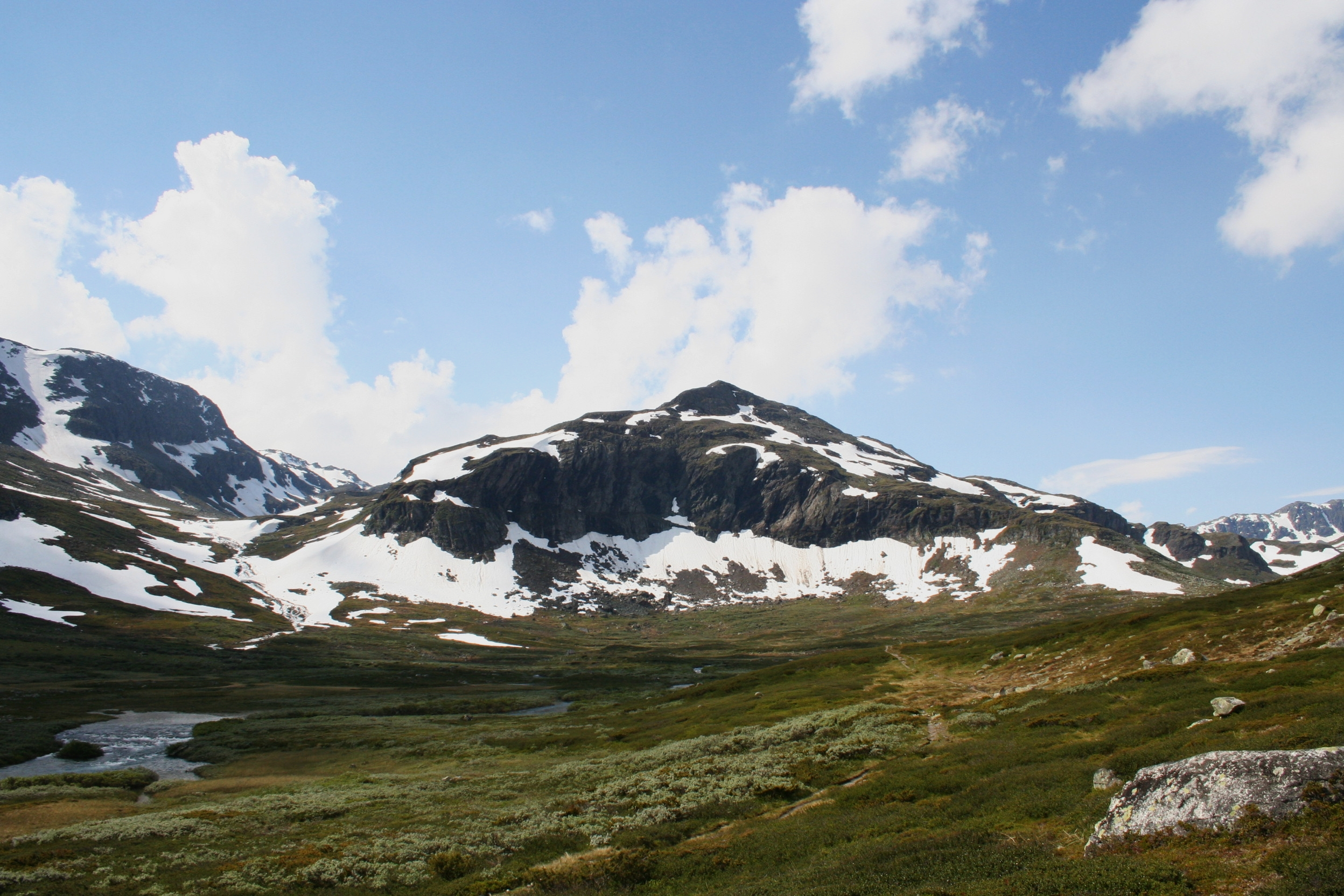
Raggsteinnuten, Norway, 1586 msl

Raggsteinnuten is a mountain of Hol municipality. Buskerud, in southern Norway. It is 1,933 metres high.
