= Kyrkjebønosi =

Mountain in Norway

Highest point
- Coordinates: 60°54′20.7″N 8°33′20.8″E

Geography
- Location: Buskerud, Norway

Kyrkjebønosi is a mountain that lies north of Hemsedal in Buskerud, Norway.
