= Tyrvlesnuten =

Mountain in Norway

Highest point
- Coordinates: 60°44′09″N 7°46′15″E

Geography
- Location: Buskerud, Norway

Tyrvlesnuten is a mountain of Buskerud, in southern Norway.
