= Kjenner =

Village in Lier municipality, Norway

Coordinates: 59°48′40″N 10°18′47″E

Kjenner is a village in Lier municipality in Buskerud, Norway.

Kjenner located near Tranby and close to the European route E18, near from the border between Buskerud and Akershus. It is situated about eight kilometers west of the center of Asker and nine kilometers to the southwest of the community center of Lierbyen. The village had 1,954 inhabitants as of 1 January 2012.
