= Julsennuten =

Mountain in Norway

Coordinates: 60.8524°N 8.0252°E

Geography
- Location: Buskerud, Norway

Julsennuten is a mountain of Ål municipality, Buskerud, in southern Norway.
