= Dramdal =

Village in Norway

Coordinates: 59°50′06″N 9°54′38″E

Dramdal is a small village in Øvre Eiker, Buskerud, Norway.

It is situated on the eastern bank of Drammenselva, opposite the village of Skotselv on the other side of the river. Norwegian National Road Riksvei 35 passes through the village.
