= Gardnos =

Norwegian village

Coordinates: 60°38′N 9°02′E

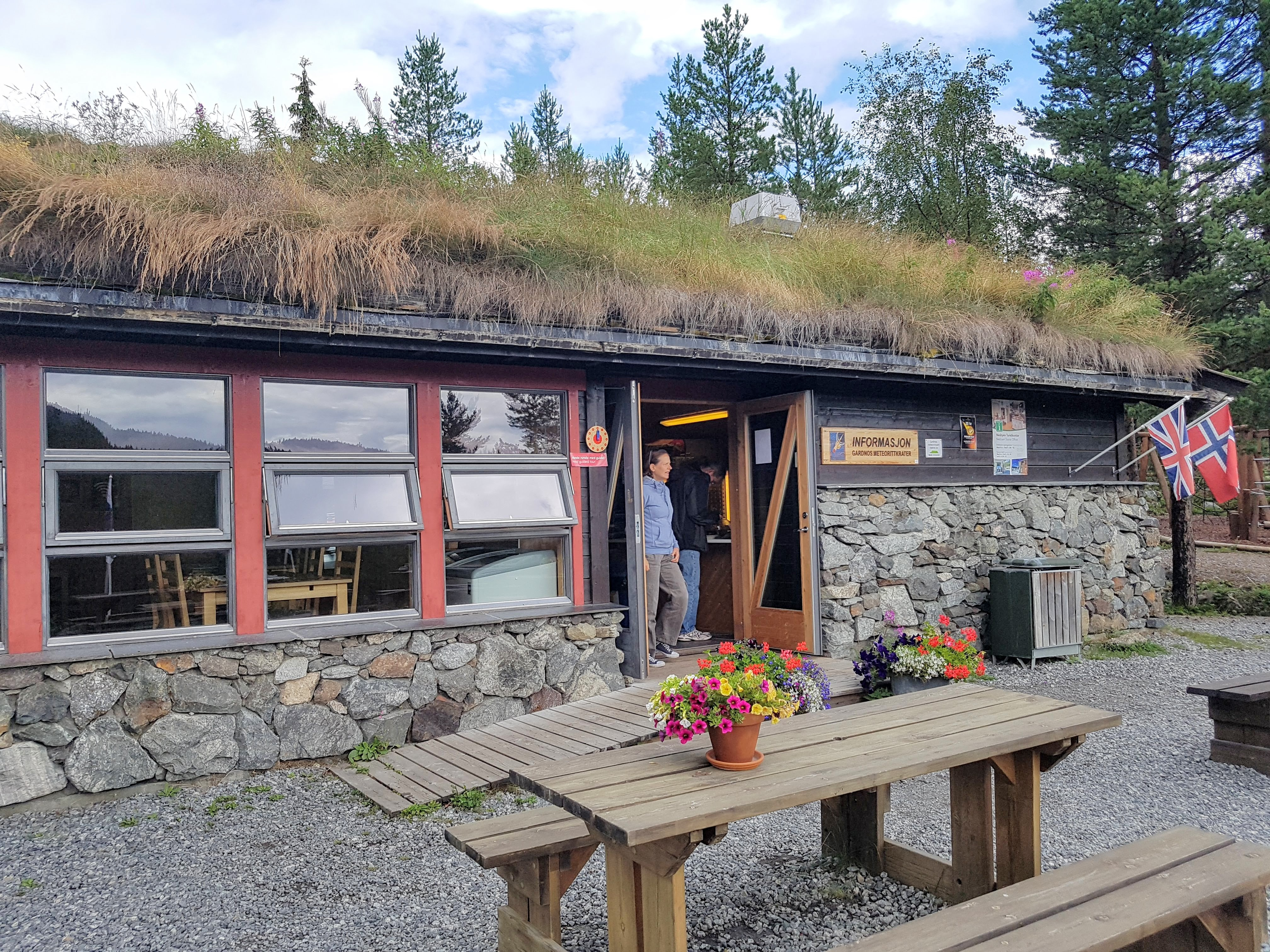
Reception and cafe of Gardnos meteorite park

Gardnos is a small village in Nesbyen municipality, Buskerud, Norway.

Gardnos is on Norwegian National Road 7 midway between Nesbyen and Gol. It is mainly known as the site of the Gardnos crater. Gardnos Meteorite Center (Gardnos Meteorittpark) is open to the public with guided tours provided during summer months.

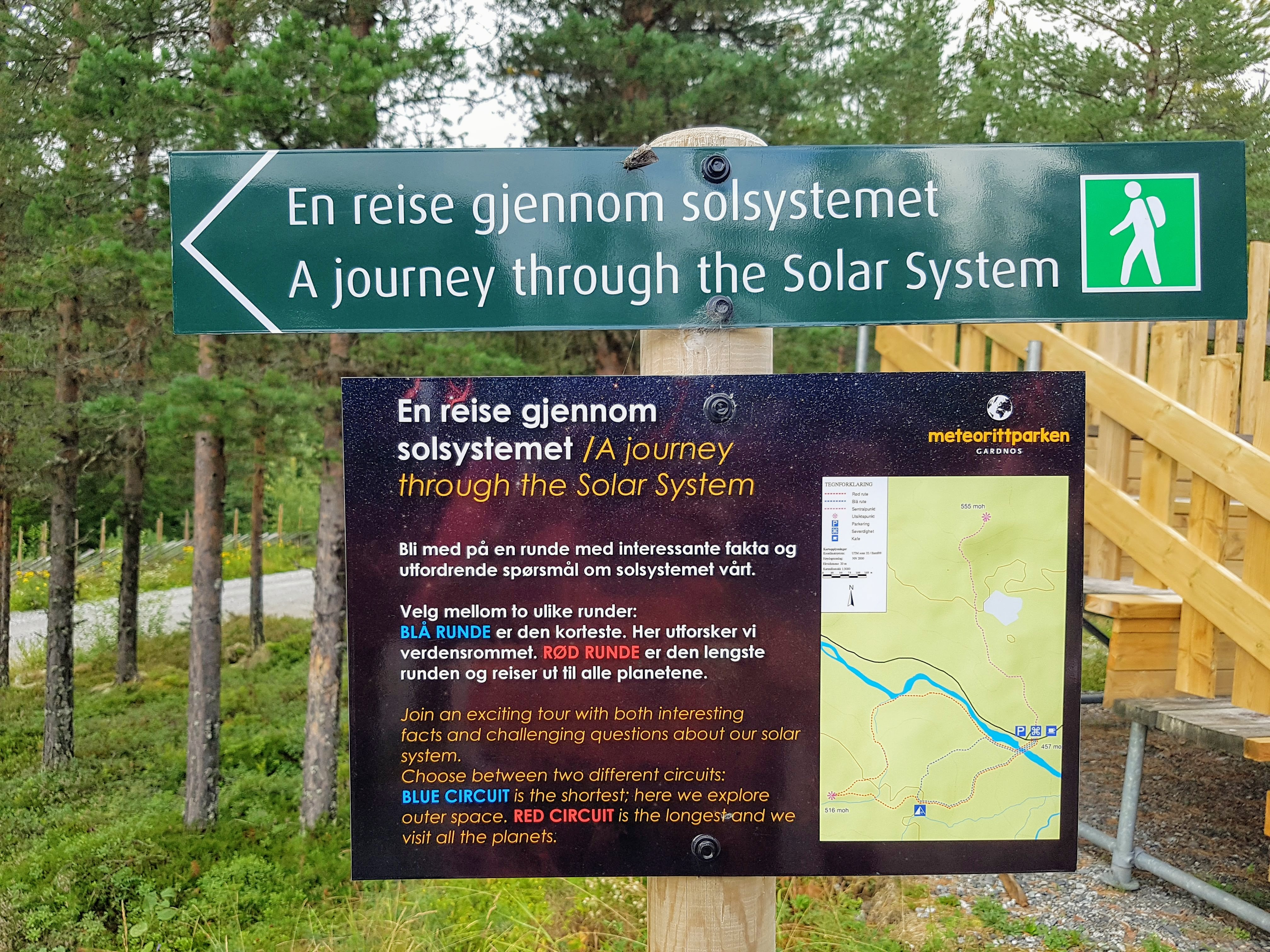
A signboard hosted near Gardnos meteorite park
