= Storegrønut =

Mountain in Norway

Coordinates: 60.0778°N 8.9929°E

Highest point
- Elevation: 1,295 to 1,297 m (4,249 to 4,255 ft)

Geography
- Location: Buskerud, Norway

Storegrønut is a mountain in Rollag and Nore og Uvdal municipalities, Buskerud, in southern Norway.
