= Storebottnosi =

Mountain in Norway

Coordinates: 61°01′02″N 8°23′37″E

Highest point
- Elevation: 1,707 m (5,600 ft)

Geography
- Location: Buskerud, Norway

Storebottnosi is a mountain of Hemsedal municipality, Buskerud, in southern Norway.
