= Askgrenda =

Settlement in Lier municipality, Norway

Coordinates: 59°48′41″N 10°11′58″E

Askgrenda is a small village in Lier municipality, Norway. The settlement has 523 inhabitants as of 1 January 2023, and is located about three kilometers north of the municipal center Lierbyen.
