= Burud =

Village in Buskerud, Norway

Coordinates: 59°48′N 9°53′E

Burud is a village in Øvre Eiker municipality in Buskerud, Norway. Burud is located on the western bank of Drammenselva, 75 kilometers from Oslo. It had a train station (Burud stasjon) which dated to 1875 on the Randsfjordbanen between Hokksund and Skotselv. This building was demolished in 1988. The station was downgraded to stop downloading tracks with passenger traffic closed down in 2001.
