= Gomnes =

Village in Buskerud, Norway

Coordinates: 60°05′N 10°10′E

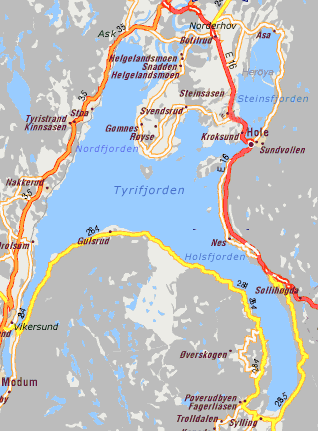
Gomnes is located on the peninsula of Røyse in Tyrifjorden

Gomnes is a small village in the municipality of Hole in Buskerud, Norway.

Gomnes is located on the peninsula of Røyse (Røysehalvøya) in Tyrifjorden. It is largely surrounded by areas of farmland. The area of Røyse is one of the most productive agricultural areas in the region. The area is known for its production of fruit, grains and vegetables. The village had 369 residents as of 1 January 2014.
