= Hyggen =

Village in Akershus, Norway

Coordinates: 59°43′N 10°21′E

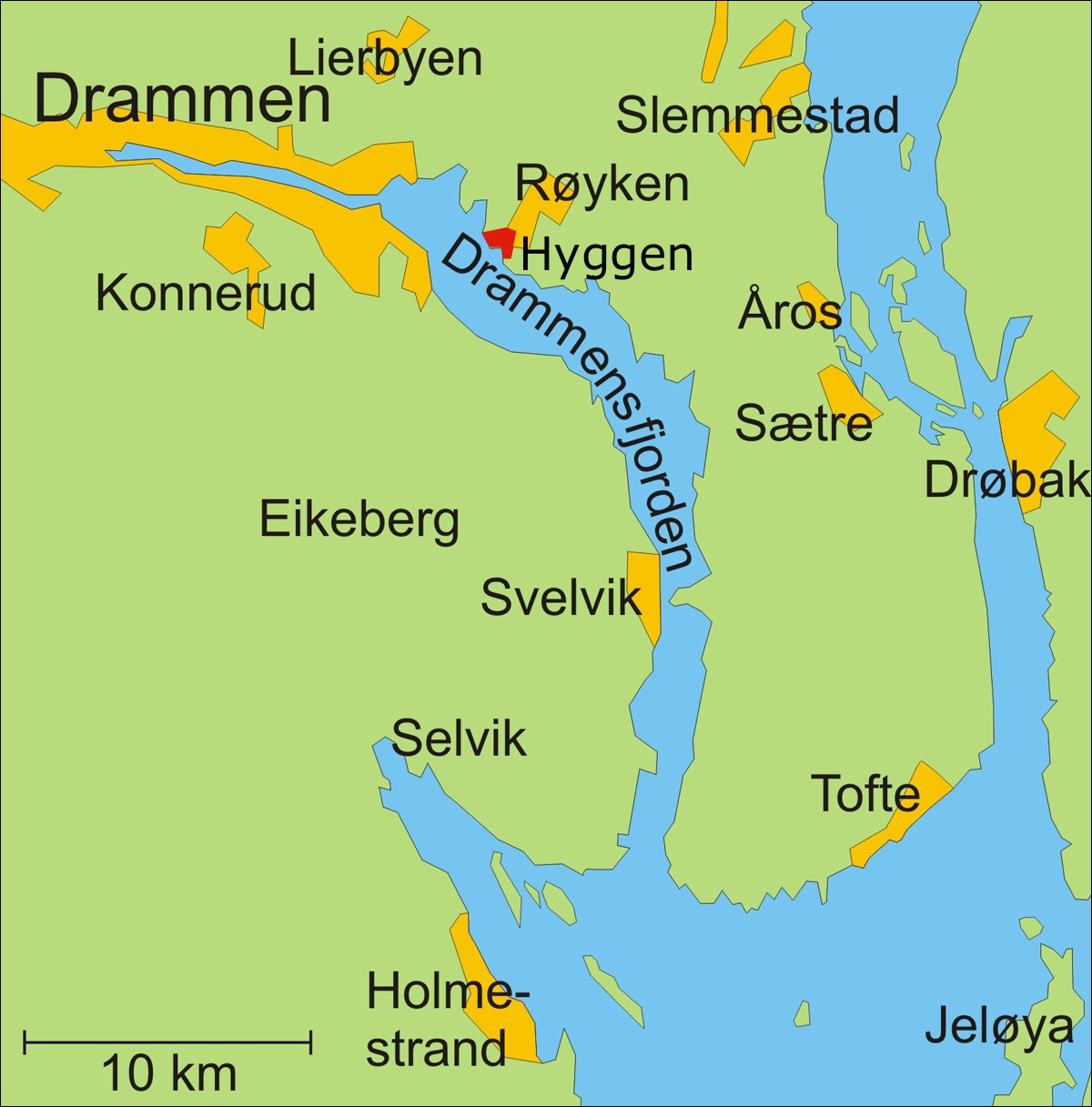
Hyggen on the east side of Drammensfjorden

Hyggen is a small village in Røyken in Asker municipality, Akershus county, Norway.

== Overview ==
Hyggen is a coastal village located along the east side of Drammensfjord. Hyggen is 4 km from Røyken, 13.7 km from Drammen and 40.6 km from Oslo. The village had 739 residents as of 1 January 2014. Hyggen was previously best known for its granite quarry. Today it is most associated with the cultivation of fruits and berries. Hyggen has both a marina and a beach. It offers short distances to recreational areas, as well as the hiking trails.

== Etymology ==
The name Hyggen probably comes from the Old Norse Heggvin (Norwegian: Hegg) a reference to the bird cherry, a tree native to northern Europe. In his book Røyken Bygd – før og nu (1928), Oluf Rygh offers an alternative, suggesting it was named after a small stream called Heggja or rather Hegg. The oldest written reference to Hyggen is from Aslak Bolts jordebok (1432–1433) a register of properties and incomes of the Archdiocese of Nidaros. The name has evolved over time; in 1400 Heggenni, Heggiunne and Hæggenne, Hegginna, in 1512 Hegien gorden, in 1617 Heggind and in 1723 Hyggen.

== Gallery ==
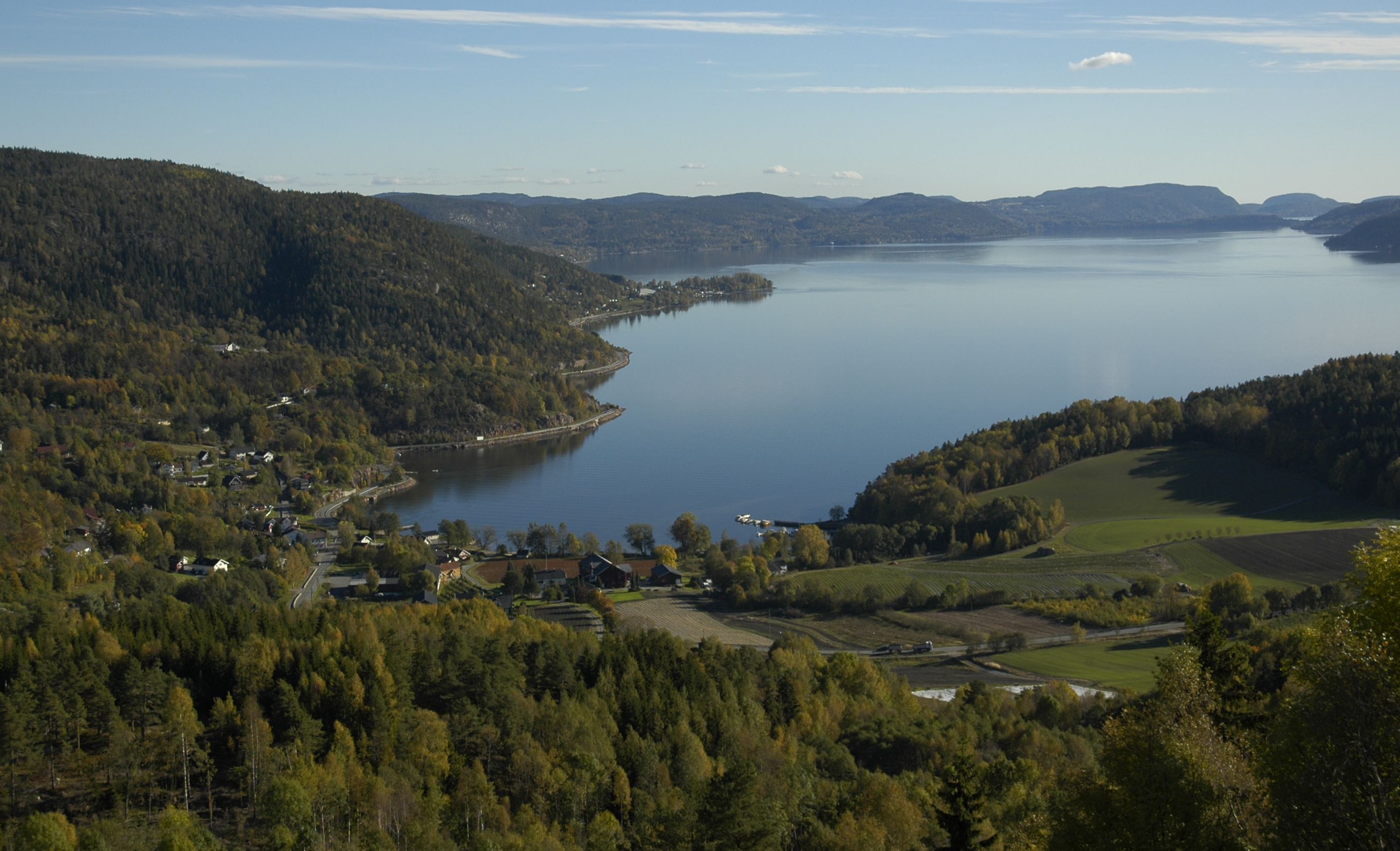
Hyggen looking south over Drammensfjord

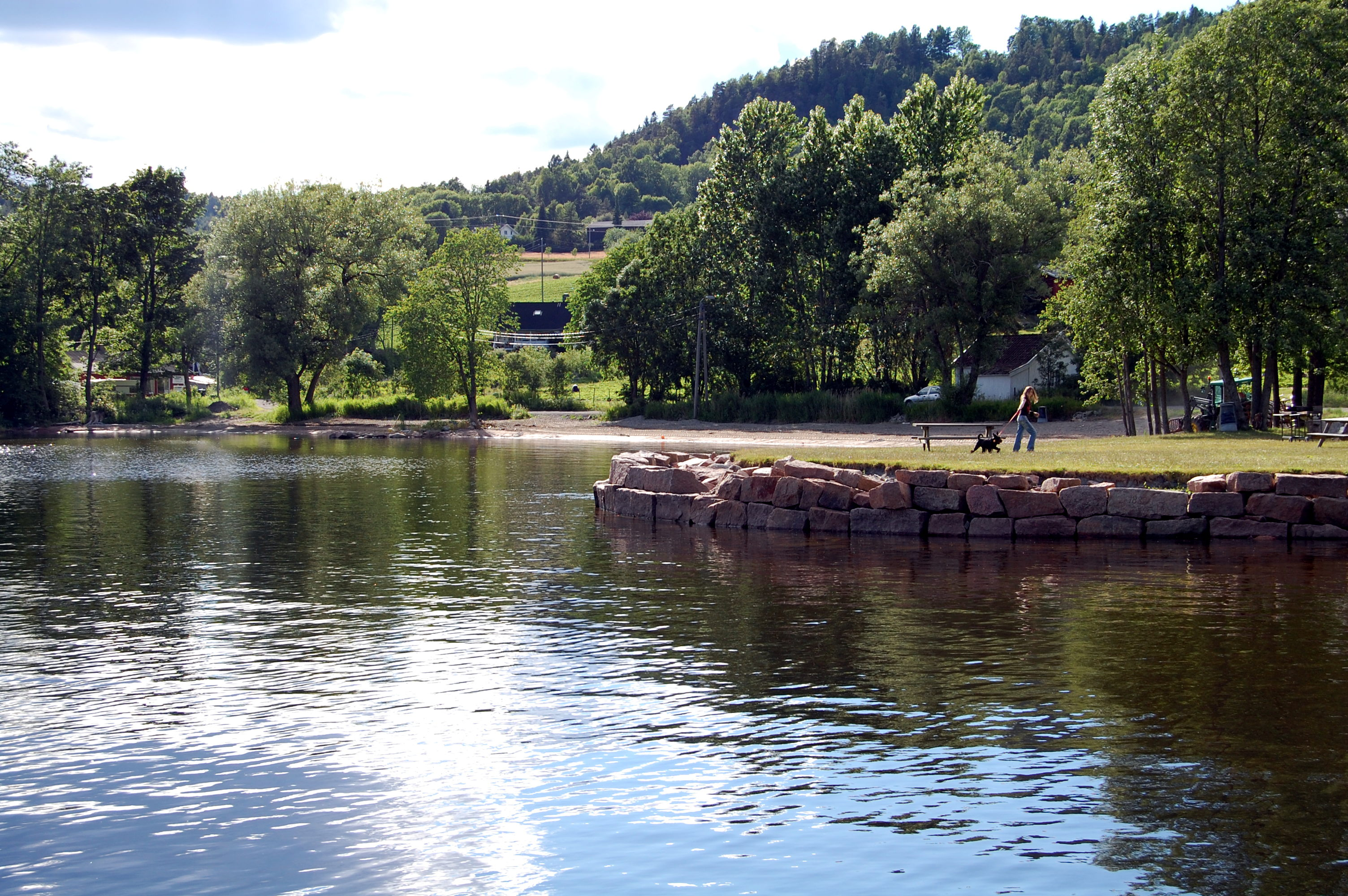
Hyggen recreation area

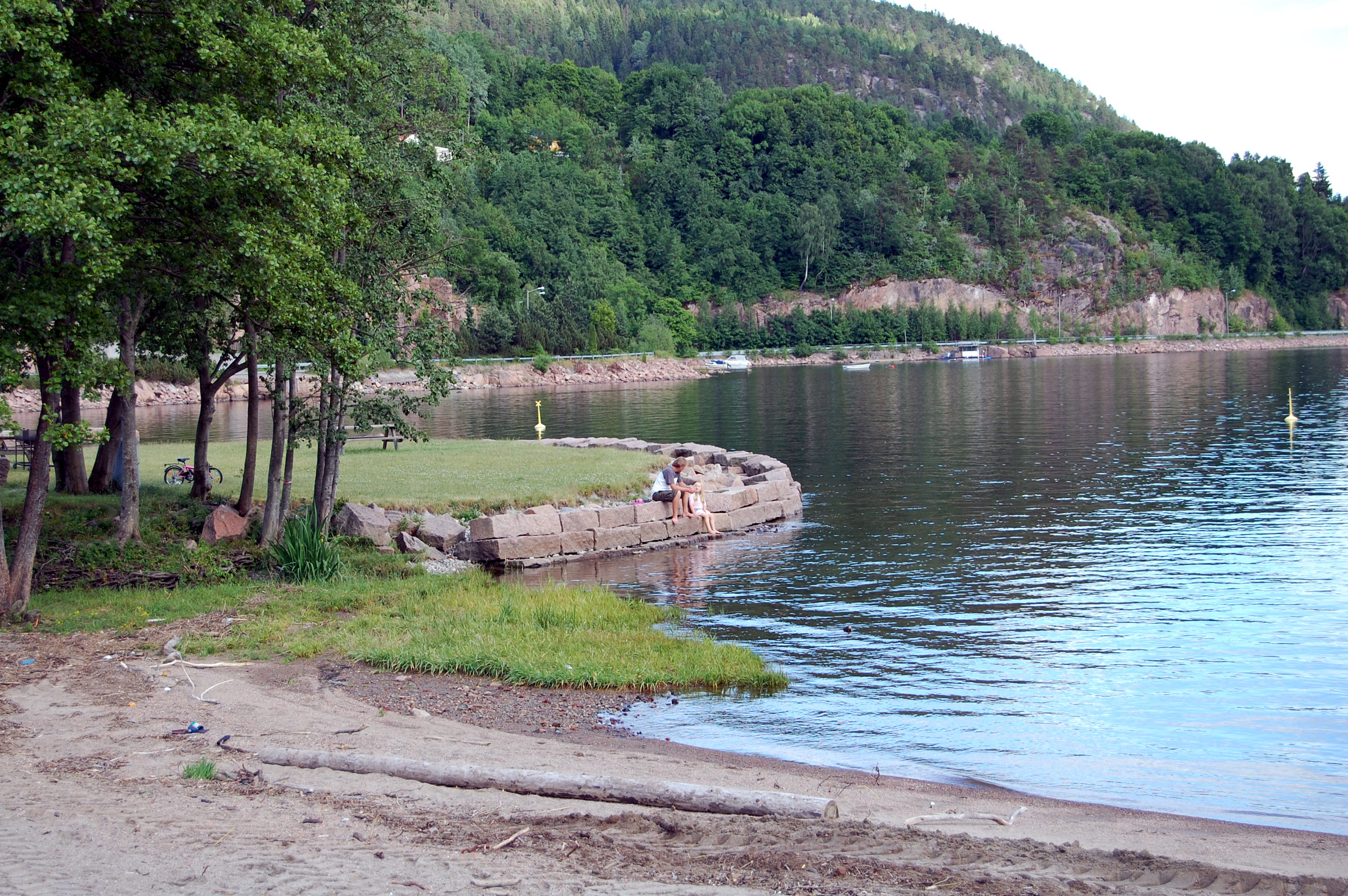
Beach at Hyggen

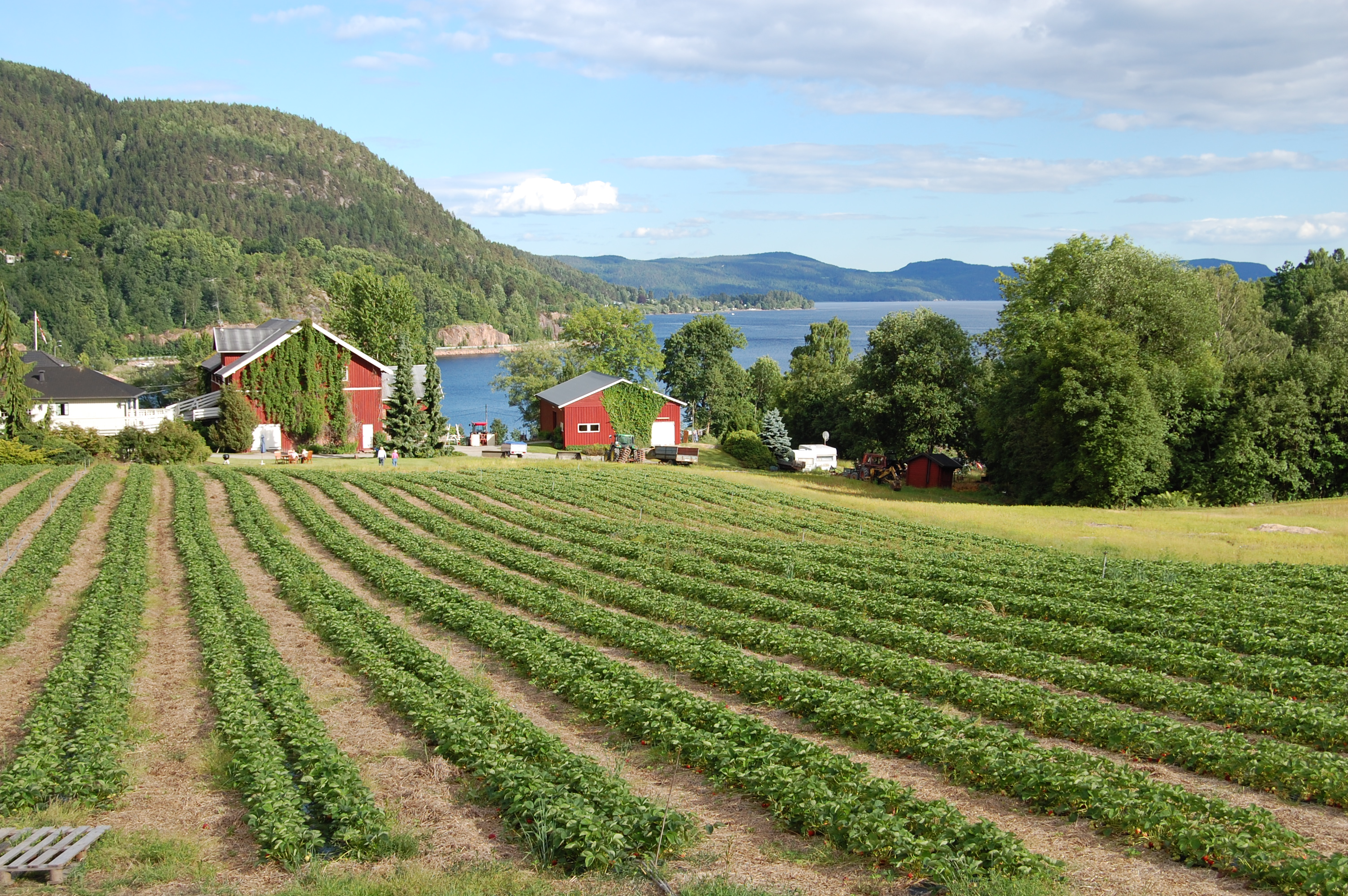
Cultivated fields in Hyggen
