= Ovenstadlia =

- Village
- Interactive map of Ovenstadlia
- Coordinates: 59°49′20″N 10°19′15″E
- Time zone: UTC+01:00 (CET)

Ovenstadlia is a village in Lier municipality, Norway. Located just north of the village Kjenner, it is a part of the urban area Kjenner, which has a population of 1,574.
