= Vargebreen =

Mountain in Buskerud, Norway

Coordinates: 60°40′32″N 7°28′11″E

Highest point
- Elevation: 1,765 to 1,767 m (5,791 to 5,797 ft)

Geography
- Location: Buskerud, Norway

Vargebreen is a mountain of Hol municipality Buskerud, in southern Norway.
