= Reistad =

- Village
- Interactive map of Reistad
- Coordinates: 59°46′35″N 10°17′19″E
- Time zone: UTC+01:00 (CET)

Reistad is a small village in Lier municipality in Buskerud, Norway. Its population in 1999 was 554, and since 2001 has considered a part of the urban area of Lierbyen.
