= Dagslett =

Village in Asker municipality, Norway

Coordinates: 59.7343765°N 10.3319361°E

Dagslett is a village in Asker municipality in Akershus county, Norway. Located just south of Spikkestad in the west of the municipality, it is a part of the Drammen urban area which stretches into Røyken. The part of the Drammen urban area that stretches into Røyken has a population of 3,114.
