= Hurumlandet =

Peninsula in Akershus county, Norway

Coordinates: 59°32′24″N 10°29′31″E

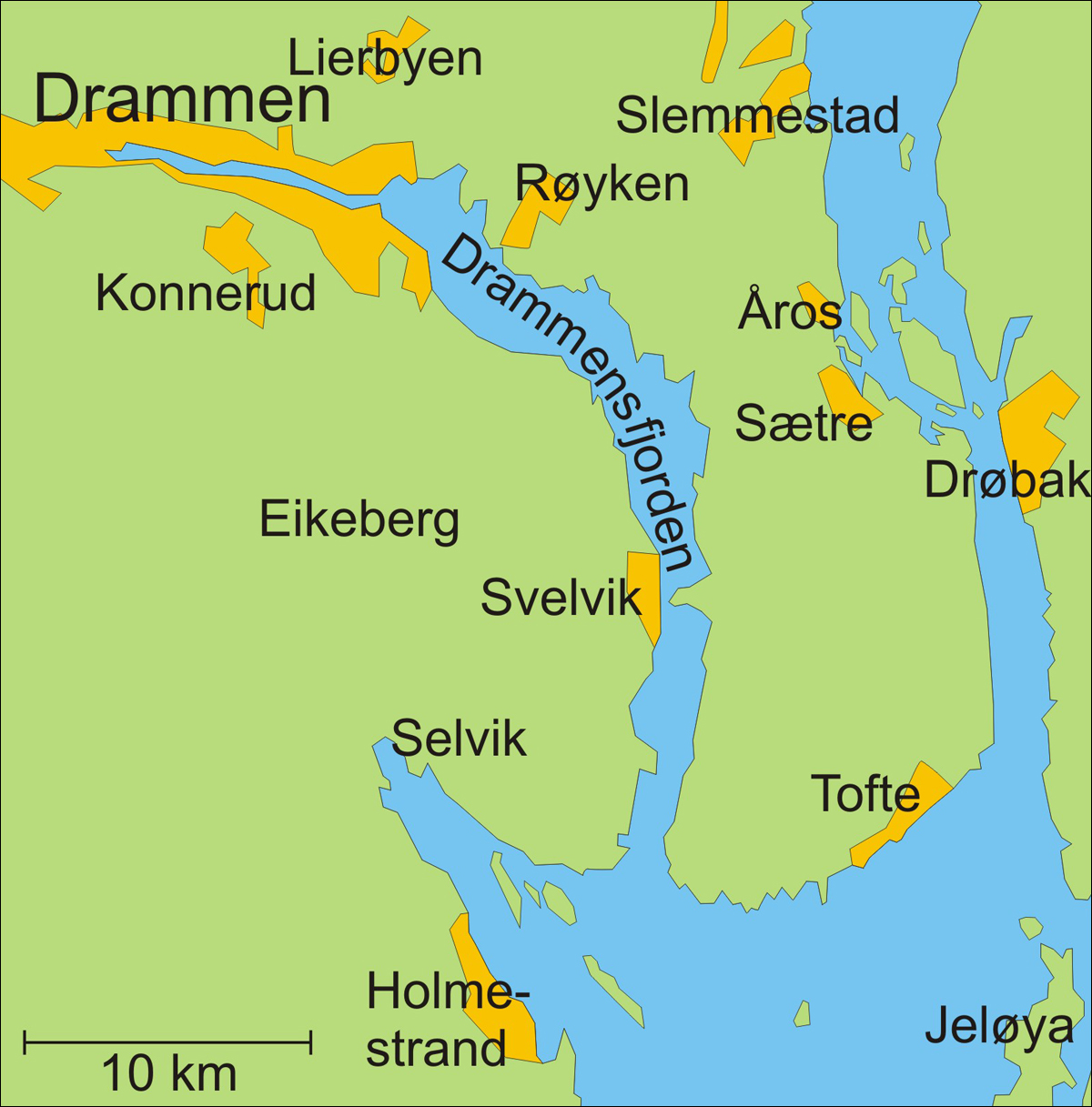
Hurumlandet is a peninsula between Oslofjord and Drammenfjord

Hurumlandet is a peninsula in Akershus county, Norway. It is situated west of the Oslofjord and east of the Drammensfjord. It comprises the southern parts of the municipality Asker. It is connected to Follo through the subsea Oslofjord Tunnel. Before 1990, Hurumlandet was the planned location for the new Oslo Airport. Ultimately, the airport was allocated to Gardermoen.

== History ==
Since the Middle Ages, Hurumlandet was a strategic headland at the entrance to the country's capital. Militarily the peninsula has been of great importance and fortifications date since the Middle Ages. West at the Drammenfjord are fortifications from the 1890s.

== Geography ==
The bedrock is very varied with the remains of an ancient volcano in the central and Ersvika and a lot of red granite in key areas. Hurum municipality consists mostly of granite deposits in the west and center parties, with deposits of shale and sandstone in a belt in the south and east. In the south there are also some limestone and a raised section of Ordovician, and started rock and quartzite parties.

== Nature preserves ==
Hurum country has a disproportionate number of protected natural areas, due to the very rich and diverse biology on the peninsula. Hurum country has coastal coniferous forest and a rich fauna, particularly on the island of Tofteholmen. Wildlife includes moose, osprey, cormorant and eider.

In the south there are eight nature reserves - Holtnesdalen (deciduous forests), Solfjellåsene (limestone habitats), Haraldsfjellet (limestone habitats), Sandbukta-Østnestangen (vegetation), Ersvikskjær (bird), Tofteskogen (forest), Ranvikholmen (plant) and Tofteholmen (plant). Further to the northeast lies Storskjær outside Sætre.

== Gallery ==
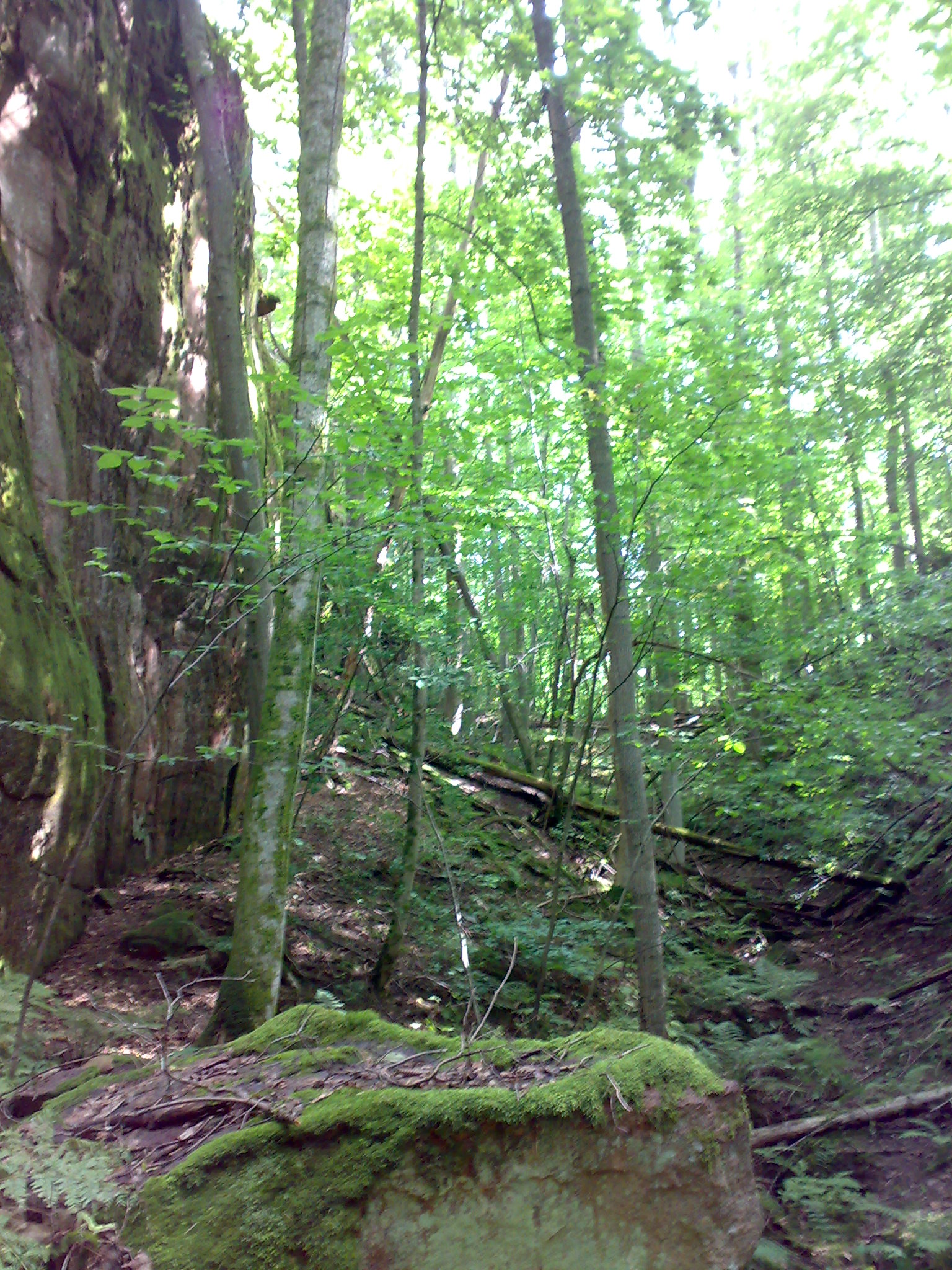
Holtnesdalen Nature Reserve

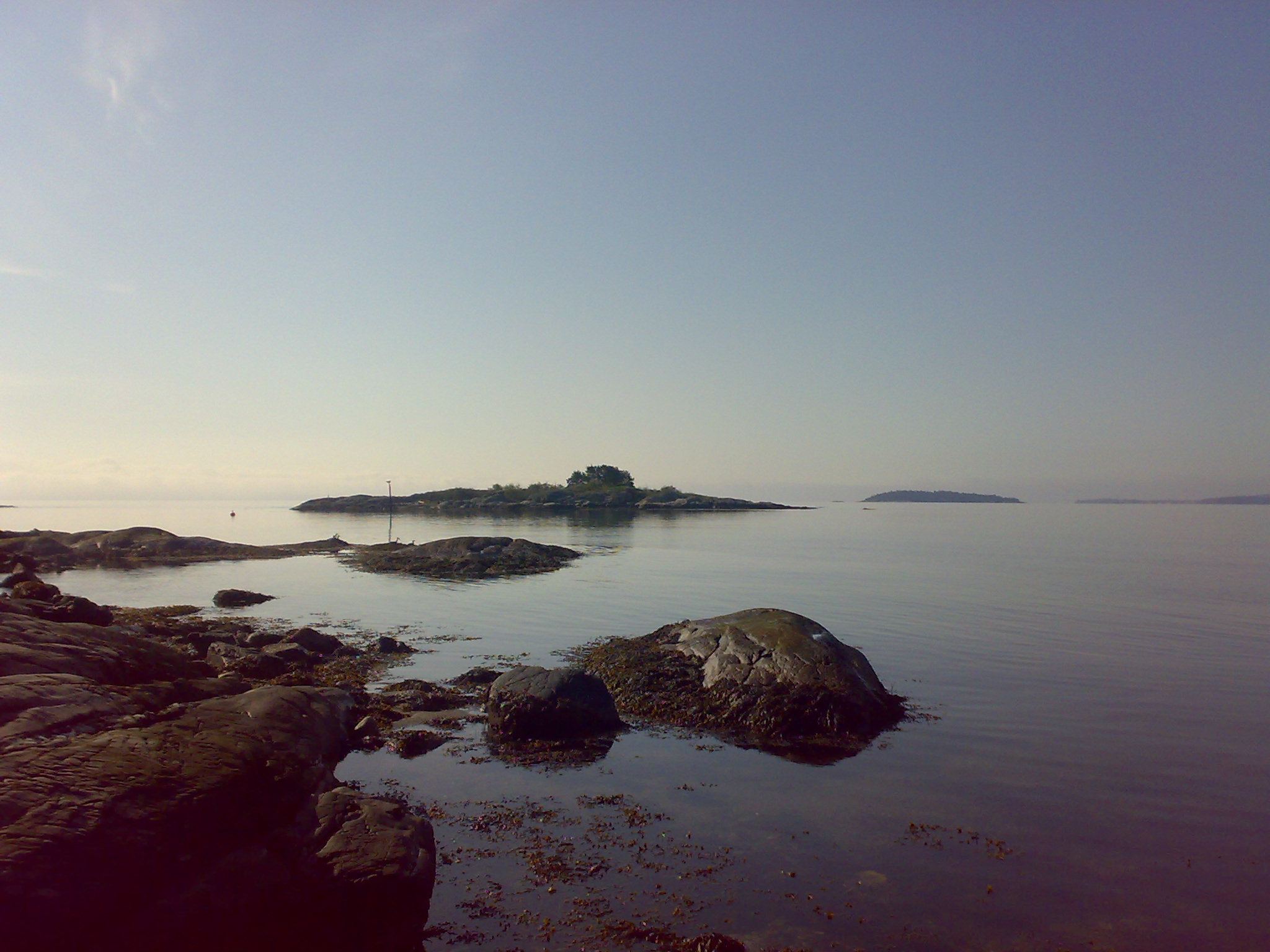
Ersvikskjær Nature Reserve

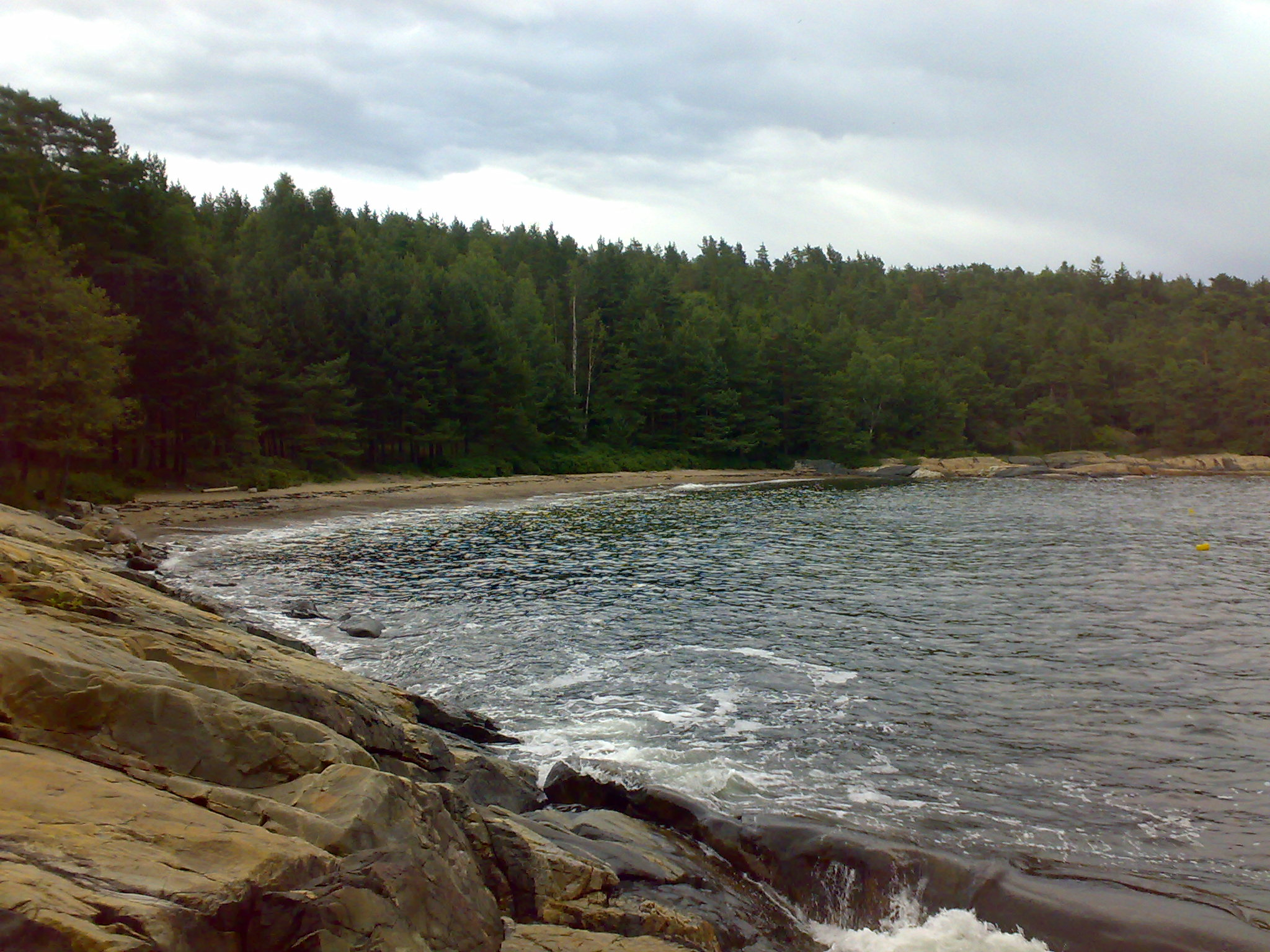
Sandbukta-Østnestangen Nature Reserve

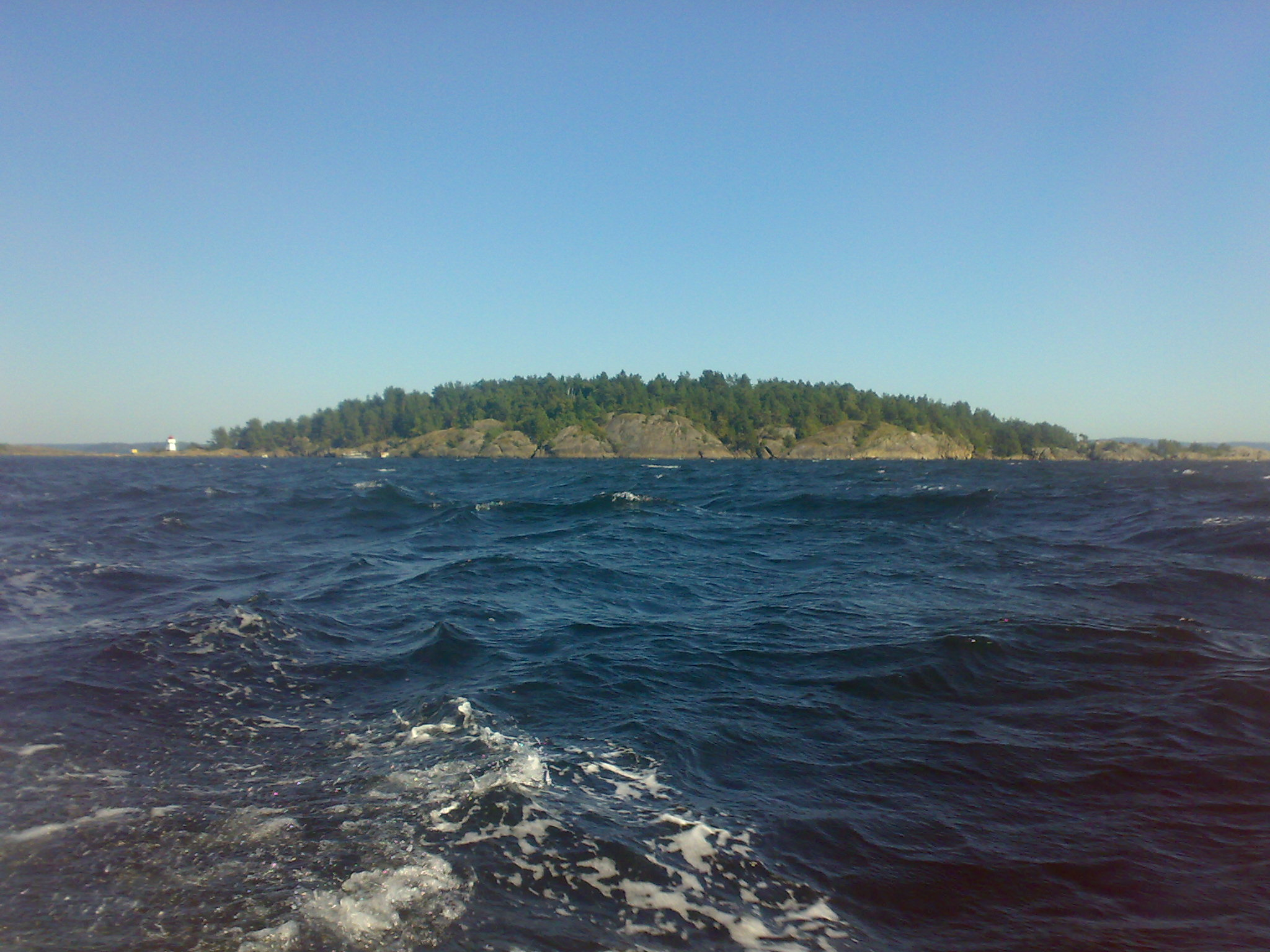
Ranvikholmen Nature Reserve

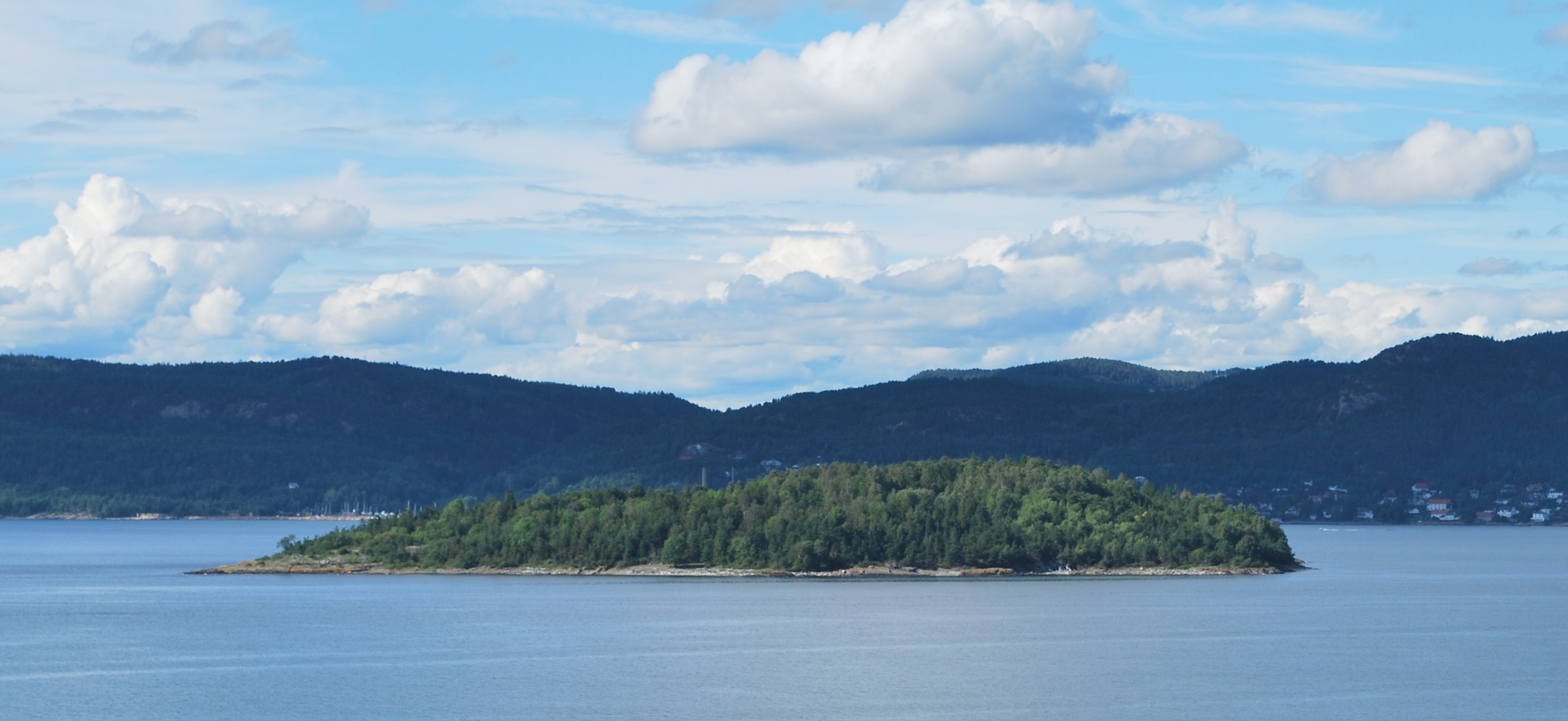
Tofteholmen Nature Reserve
