= Nakkerud =

Village in Ringerike Municipality, Norway

Coordinates: 60°03′N 10°03′E

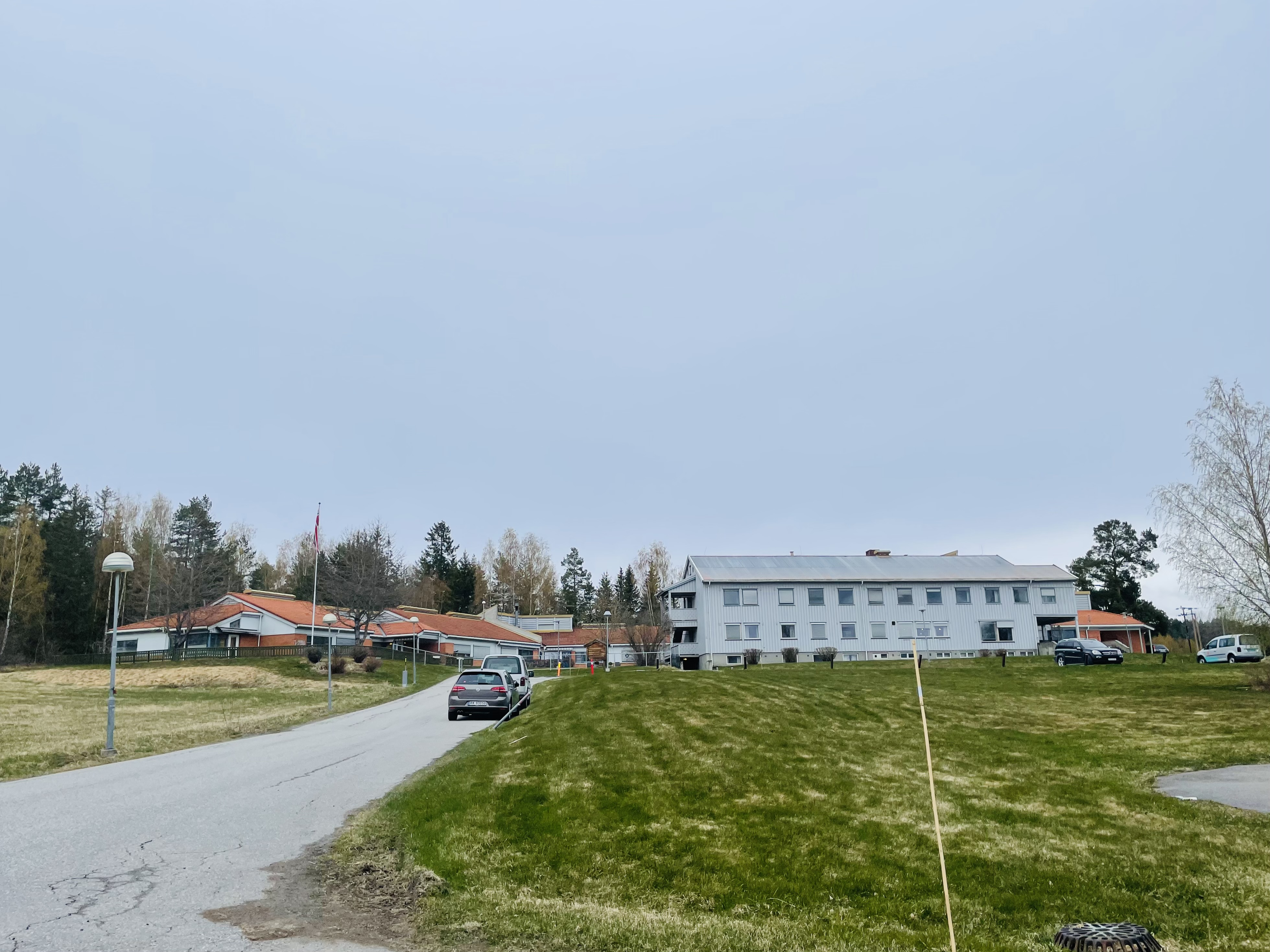
Tyribo, Solumveien 7, Nakkerud, Ringerike

Nakkerud is a small village in Ringerike municipality, Buskerud, Norway. Its population is 350.

Nakkerud is located on Norwegian National Road RV35 about 70 km from Oslo. The village is situated along the western banks of Tyrifjord on the border with Holleia in Modum. It once had a train station on Randsfjordbanen. Nakkerud was founded on the mining of copper, cobalt and nickel. In 1675, copper deposits were found at Åsterudtjern a pond on Holleia which led to regular mining in the area. In 1789, the mine was extended by including the production of cobalt. Ringerike Nikkelverk was established in 1848. The operation lasted until 1920.
