= Lierbyen =

Village in Lier Municipality, Norway

Coordinates: 59°47′0″N 10°14′0″E

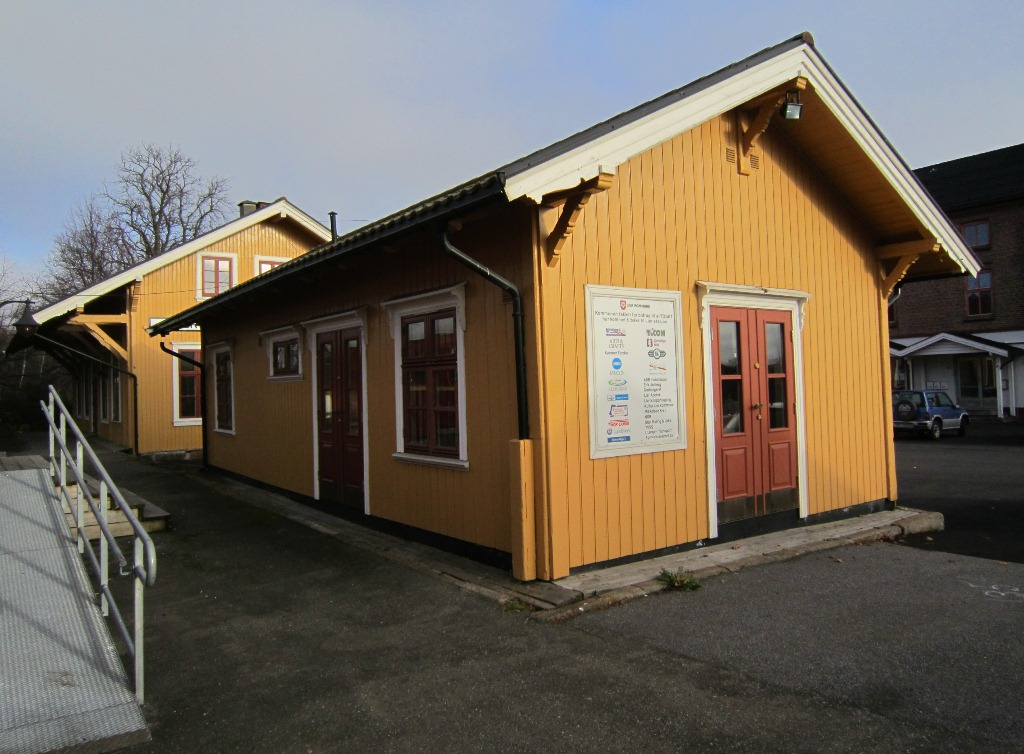
Former Lier Rail Station on the Drammen Line (1872–1973)

Lierbyen is the administrative center of Lier municipality in Buskerud county, Norway. The village is situated on the Lierelva River in the valley of Lierdalen which extends from Drammensfjord north toward Sylling near Tyrifjorden. Lierbyen is located about 39 km from Oslo, about 8 km from Drammen off European route E18. Lierbyen is a part of a greater urban area which also encompasses the villages Lier, Reistad and Kjellstad. The urban area has a population of 4,233 (2007).

Lierbyen was the birthplace of Hans Christian Heg, who emigrated in 1840 with his parents to Muskego, Wisconsin. Heg served as a colonel and brigade commander in the Union Army in the American Civil War. Heg organized the 15th Wisconsin Volunteer Regiment at Madison, Wisconsin. More popularly known as the Scandinavian Regiment, the majority of its members were immigrants from Norway, or other Scandinavian countries. His statue by Paul Fjelde was raised in Madison, Wisconsin, with a cast erected in his home village.

== Notable residents ==
- Gert Nygårdshaug

== Climate ==
Climate data for Lier 1991–2020 (39 m, avg high/low 2013-2025)
Month	Jan	Feb	Mar	Apr	May	Jun	Jul	Aug	Sep	Oct	Nov	Dec	Year
Mean daily maximum °C (°F)	−0.2 (31.6)	1.9 (35.4)	6.6 (43.9)	12.4 (54.3)	17.7 (63.9)	22 (72)	23.5 (74.3)	21.6 (70.9)	17.7 (63.9)	11 (52)	5.7 (42.3)	1.6 (34.9)	11.8 (53.3)
Daily mean °C (°F)	−2.9 (26.8)	−2.4 (27.7)	0.8 (33.4)	5.6 (42.1)	10.8 (51.4)	14.7 (58.5)	17.1 (62.8)	15.7 (60.3)	11.6 (52.9)	5.9 (42.6)	1.7 (35.1)	−2.2 (28.0)	6.4 (43.5)
Mean daily minimum °C (°F)	−6.2 (20.8)	−4.9 (23.2)	−2.6 (27.3)	0.7 (33.3)	5.8 (42.4)	10 (50)	11.9 (53.4)	10.5 (50.9)	8.2 (46.8)	3.5 (38.3)	−0.2 (31.6)	−4 (25)	2.7 (36.9)
Average precipitation mm (inches)	65 (2.6)	49 (1.9)	55 (2.2)	45 (1.8)	62 (2.4)	65 (2.6)	78 (3.1)	88 (3.5)	100 (3.9)	105 (4.1)	85 (3.3)	63 (2.5)	860 (33.9)
Source 1: yr.no
Source 2: Seklima (avg highs/lows)
