= Asker Municipality =

Asker Municipality Asker kommune
- Municipality
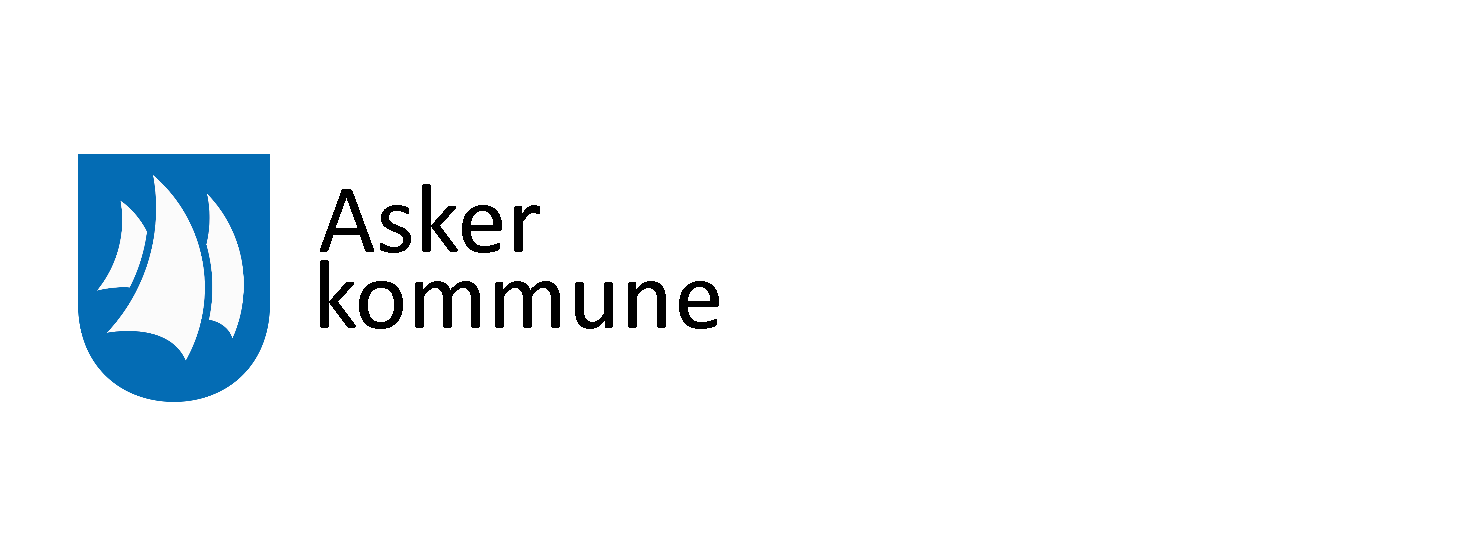
- Flag Coat of arms

- Akershus within Norway

- Asker within Akershus
- Coordinates: 59°50′7″N 10°26′6″E
- Country: Norway
- County: Akershus
- District: Akershus and Buskerud
- Administrative centre: Asker

Government
  - Mayor: Lene Conradi (H)

Official language
  - Norwegian form: Bokmål
- Time zone: UTC+01:00 (CET)
  - Summer (DST): UTC+02:00 (CEST)
- ISO 3166 code: NO-3203
- Website: Official website

Asker Municipality is a municipality in Akershus county, Norway, that was established in 2020 by the merger of Asker in Akershus and Røyken and Hurum in Buskerud county. Asker proper (also called Askerbygda) constitutes the northern fourth of the municipality, while Røyken and Hurum constitute the southern three quarters. It is part of the Greater Oslo Region. The administrative centre of the municipality is the town of Asker.

== Climate ==
The local topography leads to large variations in wind, temperature and precipitation. The southern coast of Hurumlandet has a distinct coastal climate with frequent wind and mild winters. At higher altitudes, the climate is more reminiscent of a continental climate. The weather station on Sem is placed at a higher altitude and further away from the sea compared to the centre of Asker, making the climate somewhat colder than in the centre.

Climate data for Asker - Sem 1991–2020 (163 m)
Month	Jan	Feb	Mar	Apr	May	Jun	Jul	Aug	Sep	Oct	Nov	Dec	Year
Mean daily maximum °C (°F)	−0.1 (31.8)	0.9 (33.6)	4.9 (40.8)	10.2 (50.4)	15.8 (60.4)	19.4 (66.9)	21.6 (70.9)	20.3 (68.5)	15.7 (60.3)	9.3 (48.7)	4 (39)	0.6 (33.1)	10.2 (50.4)
Daily mean °C (°F)	−2.5 (27.5)	−2.3 (27.9)	0.7 (33.3)	5.3 (41.5)	10.6 (51.1)	14.4 (57.9)	16.7 (62.1)	15.6 (60.1)	11.4 (52.5)	6.1 (43.0)	1.7 (35.1)	−1.7 (28.9)	6.3 (43.4)
Mean daily minimum °C (°F)	−5.1 (22.8)	−5.1 (22.8)	−2.6 (27.3)	1.3 (34.3)	6 (43)	10.1 (50.2)	12.6 (54.7)	12 (54)	8.3 (46.9)	3.6 (38.5)	−0.4 (31.3)	−4.1 (24.6)	3.1 (37.5)
Average precipitation mm (inches)	81.2 (3.20)	56.6 (2.23)	57.4 (2.26)	59.8 (2.35)	78.1 (3.07)	87.5 (3.44)	96.4 (3.80)	113.5 (4.47)	96.8 (3.81)	115.1 (4.53)	114.9 (4.52)	74.3 (2.93)	1,031.6 (40.61)
Average precipitation days (≥ 1.0 mm)	11	9	8	8	10	10	11	12	10	11	12	11	123
Source: National Oceanic and Atmospheric Administration
