= Svelvik Municipality =

Former municipality in Norway

Svelvik Municipality Svelvik kommune
- Former municipality
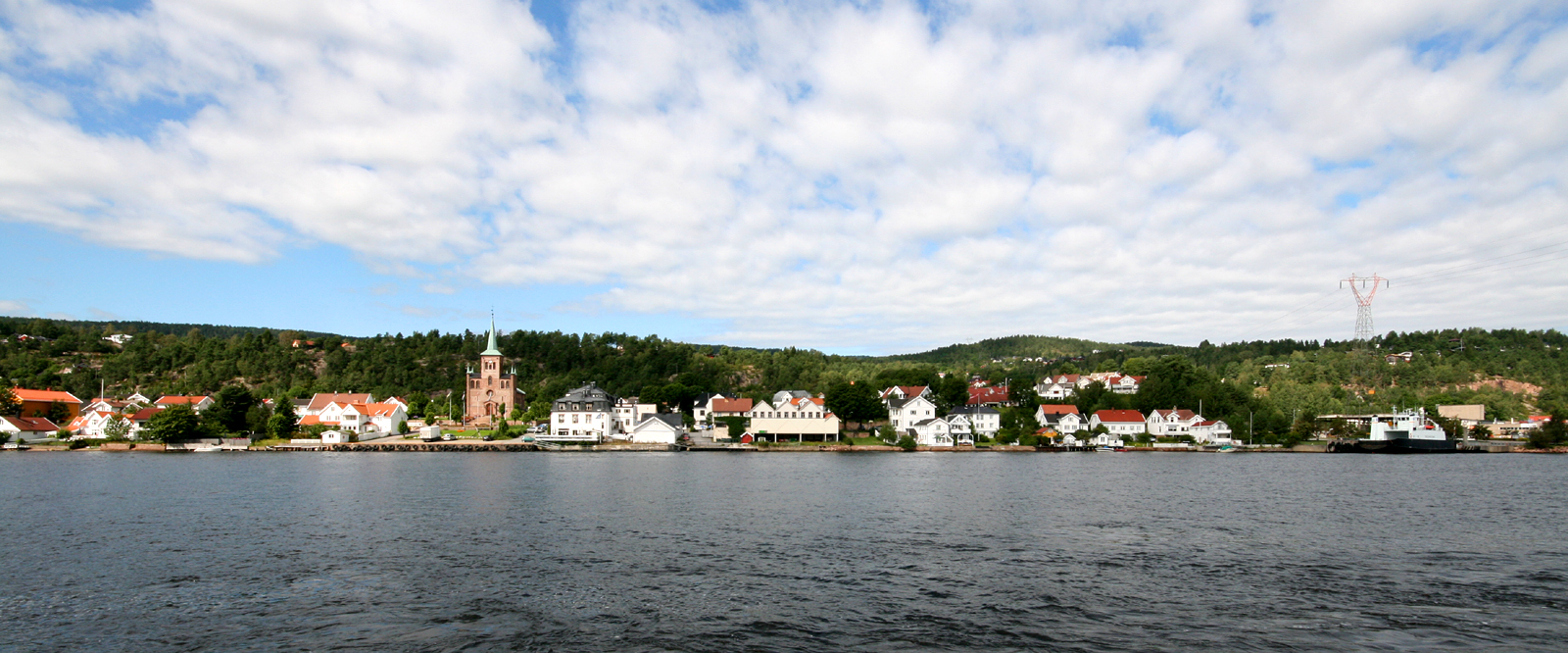
- View of the town of Svelvik

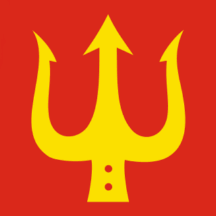
- Flag Coat of arms

- Vestfold within Norway

- Svelvik within Vestfold
- Coordinates: 59°36′49″N 10°24′32″E
- Country: Norway
- County: Vestfold
- District: Jarlsberg
- Established: 1845
  - Created as: Formannskapsdistrikt
- Disestablished: 1 Jan 2020
  - Succeeded by: Drammen Municipality
- Administrative centre: Svelvik

Area (upon dissolution)
  - Total: 57.72 km^{2} (22.29 sq mi)
  - Land: 56.25 km^{2} (21.72 sq mi)
  - Water: 1.47 km^{2} (0.57 sq mi) 2.5%

Population (2019)
  - Total: 6,685
  - Density: 118.8/km^{2} (307.8/sq mi)
- Demonym: Svelviking

Official language
  - Norwegian form: Bokmål
- Time zone: UTC+01:00 (CET)
  - Summer (DST): UTC+02:00 (CEST)
- ISO 3166 code: NO-0711

Svelvik [ˈsvæ̀ɽviːk] is a former municipality in Vestfold county, Norway. The 58-square-kilometre (22 sq mi) municipality existed from 1845 until its dissolution in 2020. The area is now part of Drammen Municipality in Buskerud county. The administrative centre was the town of Svelvik. The other population centres in Svelvik included Nesbygda and Berger.

== General information ==
The town of Svelvik was established as a municipality on 1 January 1845 when it was separated from Strømm Municipality, after it had been declared to be a ladested. Initially, the new municipality had a population of 1,201. During the 1960s, there were many municipal mergers across Norway due to the work of the Schei Committee. On 1 January 1964, the town of Svelvik (population: 1,188) was merged with Strømm Municipality (population: 2,618) to form the new Svelvik Municipality. On 1 January 1966, the village area of Berger (population: 131) was transferred from Sande Municipality to the neighboring Svelvik Municipality. On 1 January 2020, Svelvik Municipality (population: 6,685) was merged into the neighboring Drammen Municipality (which made it switch from Vestfold to Viken county). On 1 January 2024, Viken county was dissolved and this area became part of Buskerud county.

=== Name ===
The municipality (originally the parish) is named after the old Svelvik farm (Old Norse: Sverðvík) since the first Svelvik Church was built there. The first element comes from the word sverð which means "sword". The last element is vík which means "bay" or "cove". The name "sword bay" is likely referring to the Ryggen promontory ridge across from the town of Svelvik. The ridge juts out into the Drammensfjorden like a sword and divides the fjord into two-halves. The neighboring farm is called Sverstad (Norwegian: Sverðstaðir) which has the same etymology.

=== Coat of arms ===
The coat of arms was granted on 4 September 1964. The official blazon is "Gules, a trident Or" (Norwegian: På rød, bunn en gull Neptun-gaffel). This means the arms have a red field (background) and the charge is a trident. The trident has a tincture of Or which means it is commonly colored yellow, but if it is made out of metal, then gold is used. By choosing the spear of the sea god Neptune, the arms symbolizes its association with the sea. At the same time, the motif has a domestic connection because the trident is the same tool that is locally used for eel fishing. The arms were designed by Georg Winther. The municipal flag has the same design as the coat of arms.

=== Churches ===
The Church of Norway had one parish (sokn) within the municipality of Svelvik. At the time of the municipal dissolution, it was part of the Nord-Jarlsberg prosti (deanery) in the Diocese of Tunsberg.

Churches in Svelvik
Parish (sokn)	Church name	Location of the church	Year built
Svelvik	Berger Church	Berger	1895
Svelvik	Svelvik Church	Svelvik	1859

== Geography ==
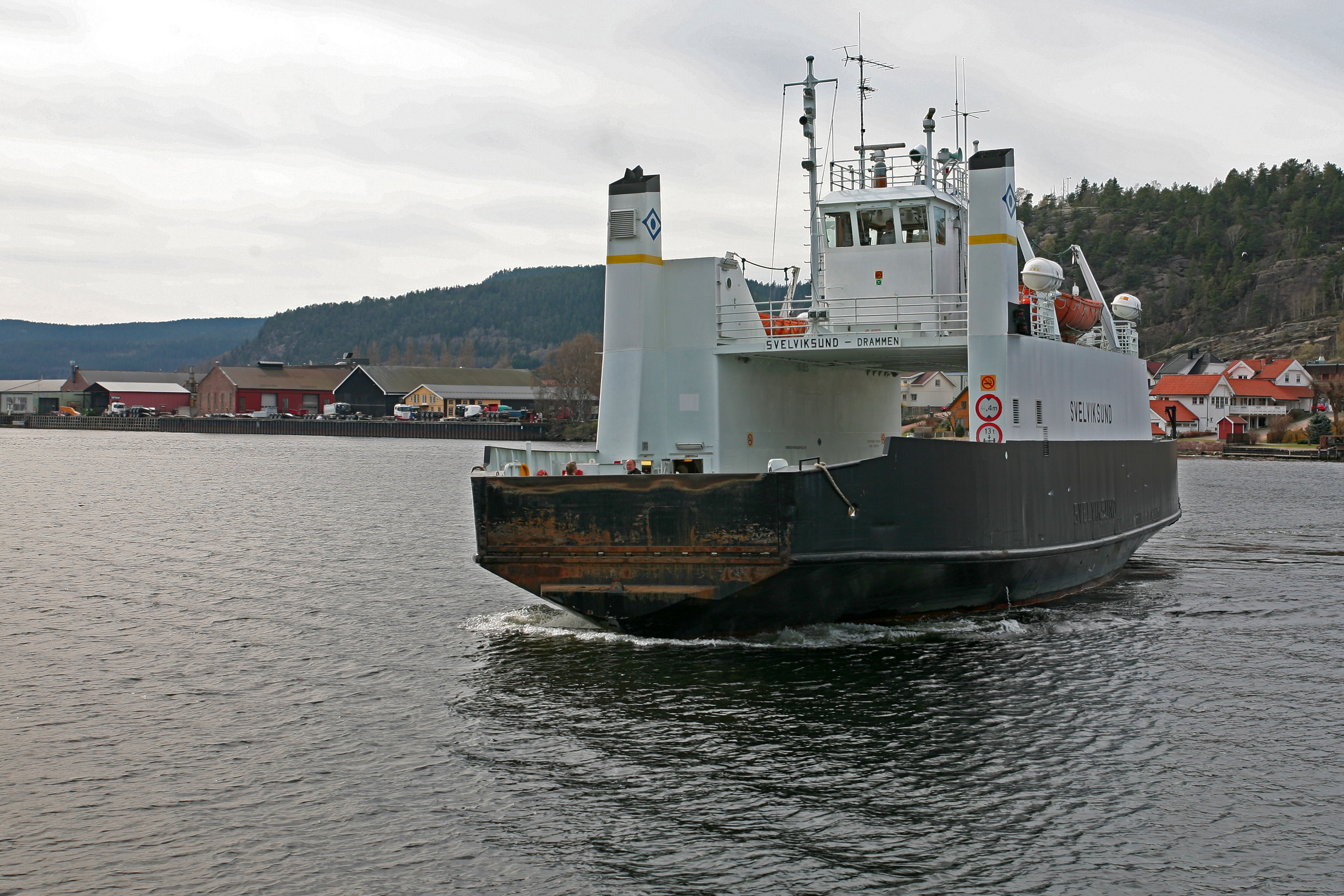
The Svelvik ferry line is the shortest in Norway.

The municipality was located on the western shore of the Drammensfjorden. The narrow Svelvikstrømmen strait is located part-way along the fjord, near the town of Svelvik. The shortest ferry line in Norway crosses the fjord there, connecting Svelvik to the Hurum peninsula.

== Government ==
Svelvik Municipality was responsible for primary education (through 10th grade), outpatient health services, senior citizen services, unemployment, social services, zoning, economic development, and municipal roads. During its existence, this municipality was governed by a municipal council of directly elected representatives. The mayor was indirectly elected by a vote of the municipal council. The municipality was under the jurisdiction of the Drammen District Court and the Borgarting Court of Appeal.

=== Mayors ===
The mayors (Norwegian: ordfører) of Svelvik (incomplete list):

- 1999–2011: Knut Erik Lippert (H)
- 2011–2015: Jonn Gunnar Lislelid (Ap)
- 2015–2019: Andreas Muri (H)

=== Municipal council ===
The municipal council (Kommunestyre) of Svelvik was made up of 25 representatives that were elected to four-year terms. The tables below show the historical composition of the council by political party.

Svelvik kommunestyre 2015–2019
Party name (in Norwegian)	Number of representatives
Labour Party (Arbeiderpartiet)	7
Progress Party (Fremskrittspartiet)	3
Conservative Party (Høyre)	6
Centre Party (Senterpartiet)	3
Liberal Party (Venstre)	1
The Independents (De Uavhengige)	5
Total number of members:	25
Note: On 1 January 2020, Svelvik Municipality was merged into Drammen Municipality.

Svelvik kommunestyre 2011–2015
Party name (in Norwegian)	Number of representatives
Labour Party (Arbeiderpartiet)	11
Progress Party (Fremskrittspartiet)	3
Conservative Party (Høyre)	7
Christian Democratic Party (Kristelig Folkeparti)	1
Centre Party (Senterpartiet)	1
Liberal Party (Venstre)	2
Total number of members:	25

Svelvik kommunestyre 2007–2011
Party name (in Norwegian)	Number of representatives
Labour Party (Arbeiderpartiet)	9
Progress Party (Fremskrittspartiet)	6
Conservative Party (Høyre)	8
Christian Democratic Party (Kristelig Folkeparti)	1
Centre Party (Senterpartiet)	1
Total number of members:	25

Svelvik kommunestyre 2003–2007
Party name (in Norwegian)	Number of representatives
Labour Party (Arbeiderpartiet)	9
Progress Party (Fremskrittspartiet)	6
Conservative Party (Høyre)	8
Centre Party (Senterpartiet)	2
Total number of members:	25

Svelvik kommunestyre 1999–2003
Party name (in Norwegian)	Number of representatives
Labour Party (Arbeiderpartiet)	12
Progress Party (Fremskrittspartiet)	3
Conservative Party (Høyre)	7
Christian Democratic Party (Kristelig Folkeparti)	1
Centre Party (Senterpartiet)	2
Total number of members:	25

Svelvik kommunestyre 1995–1999
Party name (in Norwegian)	Number of representatives
Labour Party (Arbeiderpartiet)	11
Progress Party (Fremskrittspartiet)	3
Conservative Party (Høyre)	7
Christian Democratic Party (Kristelig Folkeparti)	1
Centre Party (Senterpartiet)	2
Socialist Left Party (Sosialistisk Venstreparti)	1
Total number of members:	25

Svelvik kommunestyre 1991–1995
Party name (in Norwegian)	Number of representatives
Labour Party (Arbeiderpartiet)	11
Progress Party (Fremskrittspartiet)	1
Conservative Party (Høyre)	7
Christian Democratic Party (Kristelig Folkeparti)	1
Centre Party (Senterpartiet)	2
Socialist Left Party (Sosialistisk Venstreparti)	3
Total number of members:	25

Svelvik kommunestyre 1987–1991
Party name (in Norwegian)	Number of representatives
Labour Party (Arbeiderpartiet)	11
Progress Party (Fremskrittspartiet)	3
Conservative Party (Høyre)	8
Christian Democratic Party (Kristelig Folkeparti)	1
Centre Party (Senterpartiet)	1
Socialist Left Party (Sosialistisk Venstreparti)	1
Total number of members:	25

Svelvik kommunestyre 1983–1987
Party name (in Norwegian)	Number of representatives
Labour Party (Arbeiderpartiet)	13
Conservative Party (Høyre)	9
Christian Democratic Party (Kristelig Folkeparti)	1
Centre Party (Senterpartiet)	1
Socialist Left Party (Sosialistisk Venstreparti)	1
Total number of members:	25

Svelvik kommunestyre 1979–1983
Party name (in Norwegian)	Number of representatives
Labour Party (Arbeiderpartiet)	12
Conservative Party (Høyre)	9
Christian Democratic Party (Kristelig Folkeparti)	1
Centre Party (Senterpartiet)	2
Socialist Left Party (Sosialistisk Venstreparti)	1
Total number of members:	25

Svelvik kommunestyre 1975–1979
Party name (in Norwegian)	Number of representatives
Labour Party (Arbeiderpartiet)	14
Conservative Party (Høyre)	6
Christian Democratic Party (Kristelig Folkeparti)	2
Centre Party (Senterpartiet)	2
Socialist Left Party (Sosialistisk Venstreparti)	1
Total number of members:	25

Svelvik kommunestyre 1971–1975
Party name (in Norwegian)	Number of representatives
Labour Party (Arbeiderpartiet)	16
Conservative Party (Høyre)	5
Christian Democratic Party (Kristelig Folkeparti)	2
Centre Party (Senterpartiet)	2
Total number of members:	25

Svelvik kommunestyre 1967–1971
Party name (in Norwegian)	Number of representatives
Labour Party (Arbeiderpartiet)	15
Conservative Party (Høyre)	7
Centre Party (Senterpartiet)	2
Socialist People's Party (Sosialistisk Folkeparti)	1
Total number of members:	25

Svelvik kommunestyre 1963–1967
Party name (in Norwegian)	Number of representatives
Labour Party (Arbeiderpartiet)	16
Conservative Party (Høyre)	7
Centre Party (Senterpartiet)	2
Total number of members:	25

Svelvik bystyre 1959–1963
Party name (in Norwegian)	Number of representatives
Labour Party (Arbeiderpartiet)	13
Conservative Party (Høyre)	8
Total number of members:	21

Svelvik bystyre 1955–1959
Party name (in Norwegian)	Number of representatives
Labour Party (Arbeiderpartiet)	13
Conservative Party (Høyre)	8
Total number of members:	21

Svelvik bystyre 1951–1955
Party name (in Norwegian)	Number of representatives
Labour Party (Arbeiderpartiet)	13
Joint List(s) of Non-Socialist Parties (Borgerlige Felleslister)	6
Local List(s) (Lokale lister)	1
Total number of members:	20

Svelvik bystyre 1947–1951
Party name (in Norwegian)	Number of representatives
Labour Party (Arbeiderpartiet)	12
Christian Democratic Party (Kristelig Folkeparti)	2
Joint List(s) of Non-Socialist Parties (Borgerlige Felleslister)	6
Total number of members:	20

Svelvik bystyre 1945–1947
Party name (in Norwegian)	Number of representatives
Labour Party (Arbeiderpartiet)	13
Christian Democratic Party (Kristelig Folkeparti)	3
Local List(s) (Lokale lister)	4
Total number of members:	20

Svelvik bystyre 1937–1941*
Party name (in Norwegian)	Number of representatives
Labour Party (Arbeiderpartiet)	9
Joint List(s) of Non-Socialist Parties (Borgerlige Felleslister)	11
Total number of members:	20
Note: Due to the German occupation of Norway during World War II, no elections were held for new municipal councils until after the war ended in 1945.

Svelvik bystyre 1934–1937
Party name (in Norwegian)	Number of representatives
Labour Party (Arbeiderpartiet)	7
Joint List(s) of Non-Socialist Parties (Borgerlige Felleslister)	7
Local List(s) (Lokale lister)	6
Total number of members:	20

== See also ==
- List of former municipalities of Norway
