= Svelvik (disambiguation) =

Svelvik may refer to:

== Places ==
- Svelvik, a town in Drammen Municipality in Buskerud county, Norway
  - Svelvik Church, a church in Drammen Municipality in Buskerud county, Norway
- Svelvik, Tjøme, a village in Færder Municipality in Vestfold county, Norway
- Svelvik Municipality, a former municipality in Vestfold county, Norway
