= Strømm =

Former municipality in Norway

Strømm Municipality Strømm herred
- Former municipality
- Strømmen herred (historic name)
- Vestfold within Norway

- Strømm within Vestfold
- Coordinates: 59°36′06″N 10°23′54″E
- Country: Norway
- County: Vestfold
- District: Jarlsberg
- Established: 1 Jan 1838
  - Created as: Formannskapsdistrikt
- Disestablished: 1 Jan 1964
  - Succeeded by: Svelvik Municipality
- Administrative centre: Svelvik

Area (upon dissolution)
  - Total: 57 km^{2} (22 sq mi)

Population (1964)
  - Total: 2,618
  - Density: 46/km^{2} (120/sq mi)
- Demonym: Strømm-folk

Official language
  - Norwegian form: Neutral
- Time zone: UTC+01:00 (CET)
  - Summer (DST): UTC+02:00 (CEST)
- ISO 3166 code: NO-0711

Strømm is a former municipality in Vestfold county, Norway. The 57-square-kilometre (22 sq mi) municipality existed from 1838 until its dissolution in 1964. The area is now part of Drammen Municipality in Buskerud county. The administrative centre was the town of Svelvik (which was not actually part of the municipality). The village of Nesbygda was also located in the municipality.

== History ==
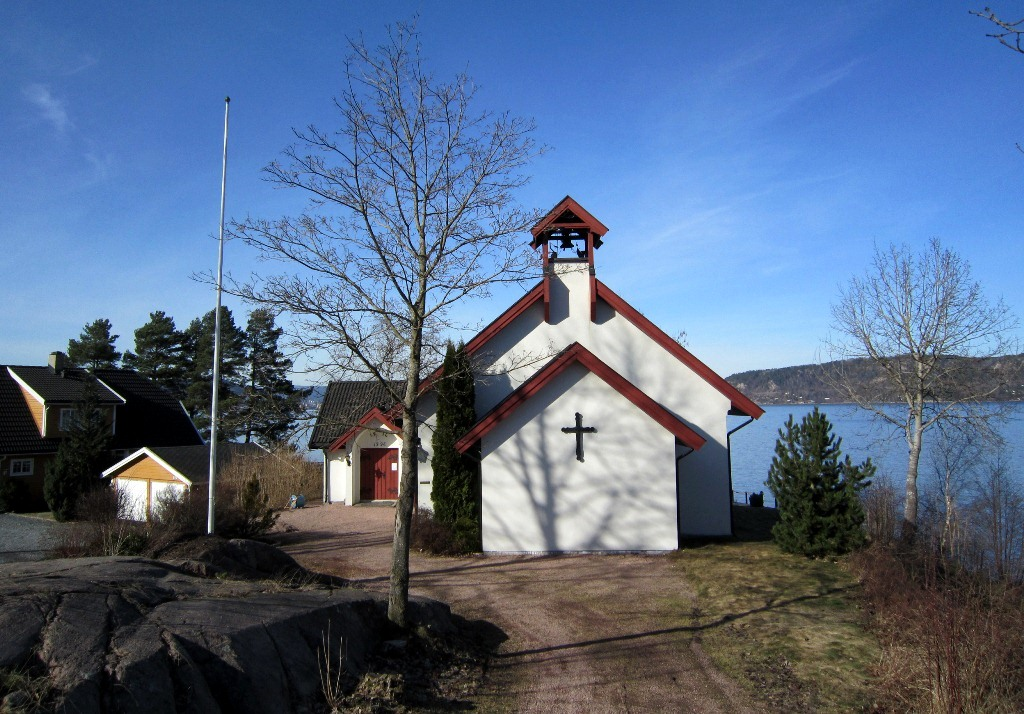
Nesbygda Church in Strømm

The parish of Hurum was historically located in Buskerud and Jarlsberg og Laurvig counties and it including land on both sides of the Drammensfjorden which was the dividing boundary between the two counties. The western side was called Strømmen (later changed to Strømm) and it was in Jarlsberg og Laurvig, which the eastern side of Hurum was in Buskerud. On 1 January 1838, the formannskapsdistrikt law went into effect and it made each parish into a civil municipality, but the new municipalities had to be in one county only. Because of this, Strømmen was established as its own municipality located wholly within Jarlsberg og Laurvig county. The town of Svelvik (population: 1,201) was established as a separate municipality on 1 January 1845 when it was separated from Strømm Municipality. This left Strømmen with 794 residents. During the 1960s, there were many municipal mergers across Norway due to the work of the Schei Committee. On 1 January 1964, the town of Svelvik (population: 1,188) was merged with Strømm Municipality (population: 2,618) to form the new Svelvik Municipality.

=== Name ===
The municipality (originally the parish) is named after the old Strømmen farm (Old Norse: Straumr) which is now where the town of Svelvik is located. The name is derived from the word straumr which means "stream" or "current". This is referring to the strong current in the narrow strait in the Drammensfjorden between Svelvik and Hurum. Historically, the name of the municipality was spelled Strømmen. On 3 November 1917, a royal resolution changed the spelling of the name of the municipality to Strømm, removing the definite form ending -en.

== Government ==
Strømm Municipality was responsible for primary education (through 10th grade), outpatient health services, senior citizen services, unemployment, social services, zoning, economic development, and municipal roads. During its existence, this municipality was governed by a municipal council of directly elected representatives. The mayor was indirectly elected by a vote of the municipal council.

=== Municipal council ===
The municipal council (Herredsstyre) of Strømm was made up of 21 representatives that were elected to four year terms. The tables below show the historical composition of the council by political party.

Strømm herredsstyre 1959–1963
Party name (in Norwegian)	Number of representatives
Labour Party (Arbeiderpartiet)	13
Conservative Party (Høyre)	5
Centre Party (Senterpartiet)	3
Total number of members:	21
Note: On 1 January 1964, Strømm Municipality was merged into Svelvik Municipality.

Strømm herredsstyre 1955–1959
Party name (in Norwegian)	Number of representatives
Labour Party (Arbeiderpartiet)	13
Christian Democratic Party (Kristelig Folkeparti)	5
Farmers' Party (Bondepartiet)	3
Total number of members:	21

Strømm herredsstyre 1951–1955
Party name (in Norwegian)	Number of representatives
Labour Party (Arbeiderpartiet)	11
Farmers' Party (Bondepartiet)	3
Joint List(s) of Non-Socialist Parties (Borgerlige Felleslister)	6
Total number of members:	20

Strømm herredsstyre 1947–1951
Party name (in Norwegian)	Number of representatives
Labour Party (Arbeiderpartiet)	12
Joint List(s) of Non-Socialist Parties (Borgerlige Felleslister)	8
Total number of members:	20

Strømm herredsstyre 1945–1947
Party name (in Norwegian)	Number of representatives
Labour Party (Arbeiderpartiet)	13
Joint List(s) of Non-Socialist Parties (Borgerlige Felleslister)	5
Local List(s) (Lokale lister)	2
Total number of members:	20

Strømm herredsstyre 1937–1941*
Party name (in Norwegian)	Number of representatives
Labour Party (Arbeiderpartiet)	8
Farmers' Party (Bondepartiet)	7
Local List(s) (Lokale lister)	5
Total number of members:	20
Note: Due to the German occupation of Norway during World War II, no elections were held for new municipal councils until after the war ended in 1945.

== See also ==
- List of former municipalities of Norway
