= Ytre Oslofjord =

Fjord in Eastern Norway

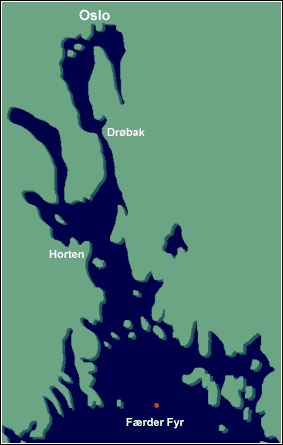
- View of the fjord
- Interactive map of the fjord
- Location: Eastern Norway
- Coordinates: 59.3387924°N 10.577087°E
- Type: Fjord
- Basin countries: Norway
- Max. length: 65 kilometres (40 mi)

Ytre Oslofjord (lit. 'Outer Oslofjord') is part of a fjord in eastern Norway. The Ytre Oslofjord is the outer part of the Oslofjord which is south of point where the Hurumlandet peninsula splits the fjord between the Drøbak Sound (the strait where the fjord narrows between Drøbak and [[Hurum]]) to the east and the Drammensfjorden to the west. North of this point, the Oslofjord is referred to as the Indre Oslofjord (inner Oslofjord). The Ytre Oslofjord stretches south to the Færder Lighthouse.

== See also ==
- List of Norwegian fjords
