= Berger Church =

Church in Buskerud, Norway

- Berger kirke
- View of the church
- Berger Church
- 59°32′41″N 10°23′17″E
- Location: Drammen Municipality, Buskerud
- Country: Norway
- Denomination: Church of Norway
- Churchmanship: Evangelical Lutheran

History
- Status: Parish church
- Founded: 1895
- Consecrated: 7 June 1895

Architecture
- Functional status: Active
- Architect: Schak Bull
- Architectural type: Long church
- Completed: 1895 (131 years ago)

Specifications
- Capacity: 200
- Materials: Wood

Administration
- Diocese: Tunsberg bispedømme
- Deanery: Drammen og Lier prosti
- Parish: Svelvik
- Norwegian Cultural Heritage Site
- Type: Church
- Status: Not protected
- ID: 83877

Berger Church (Norwegian: Berger kirke) is a parish church of the Church of Norway in Drammen Municipality in Buskerud county, Norway. It is located in the village of Berger. It is one of the churches for the Svelvik parish which is part of the Drammen og Lier prosti (deanery) in the Diocese of Tunsberg. The white, wooden church was built in a long church design in 1895 using plans drawn up by the architect Schak Bull. The church seats about 200 people.

== History ==
The church was designed by Schak Bull and it was built on the grounds of Berger farm. The new building was consecrated on 7 June 1895. The same architectural drawings were used shortly afterwards for the construction of the Ytre Arna Church near Bergen. The construction took place at a time when the Berger and Fossekleven factories were in operation (today the factories are museums), and the church was financed by the Jebsen family, who owned the factories. It was privately owned until 1970, when it was given free of charge as a gift to Svelvik Municipality after the factory operations had gone downhill.

The building is a wooden long church with a rectangular nave, a choir surrounded by small sacristies and a west tower. The church has a second floor seating gallery in the west. The interior was extensively rebuilt and renovated in 1948–1949 under the leadership of Arnstein Arneberg in collaboration with Axel Revold. The church was reopened on 18 September 1949. In the following years, the church fell into disrepair, as the local factory operation was not going well, and the maintenance costs and ownership of the church were taken over by Svelvik Municipality.

== Media gallery ==

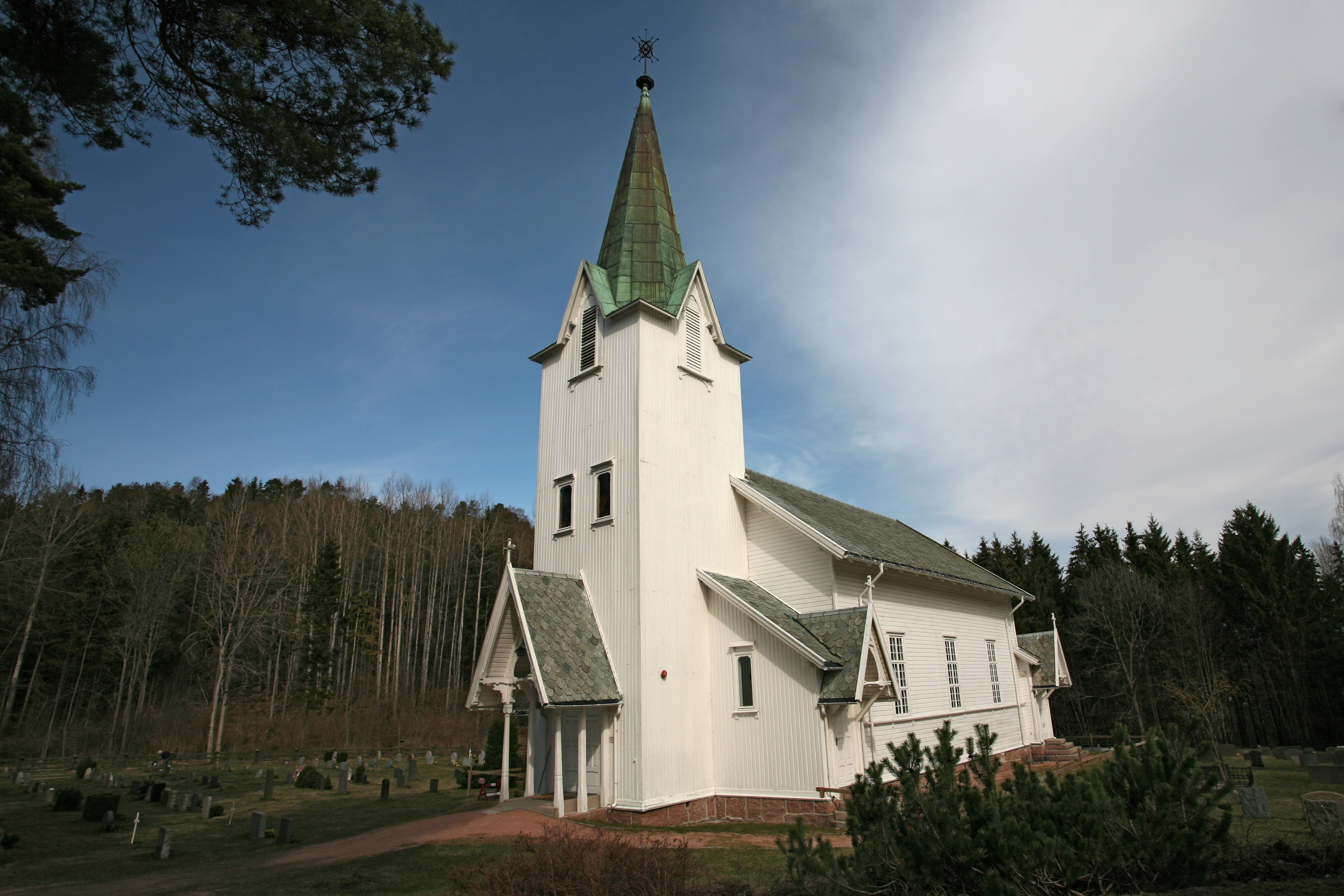

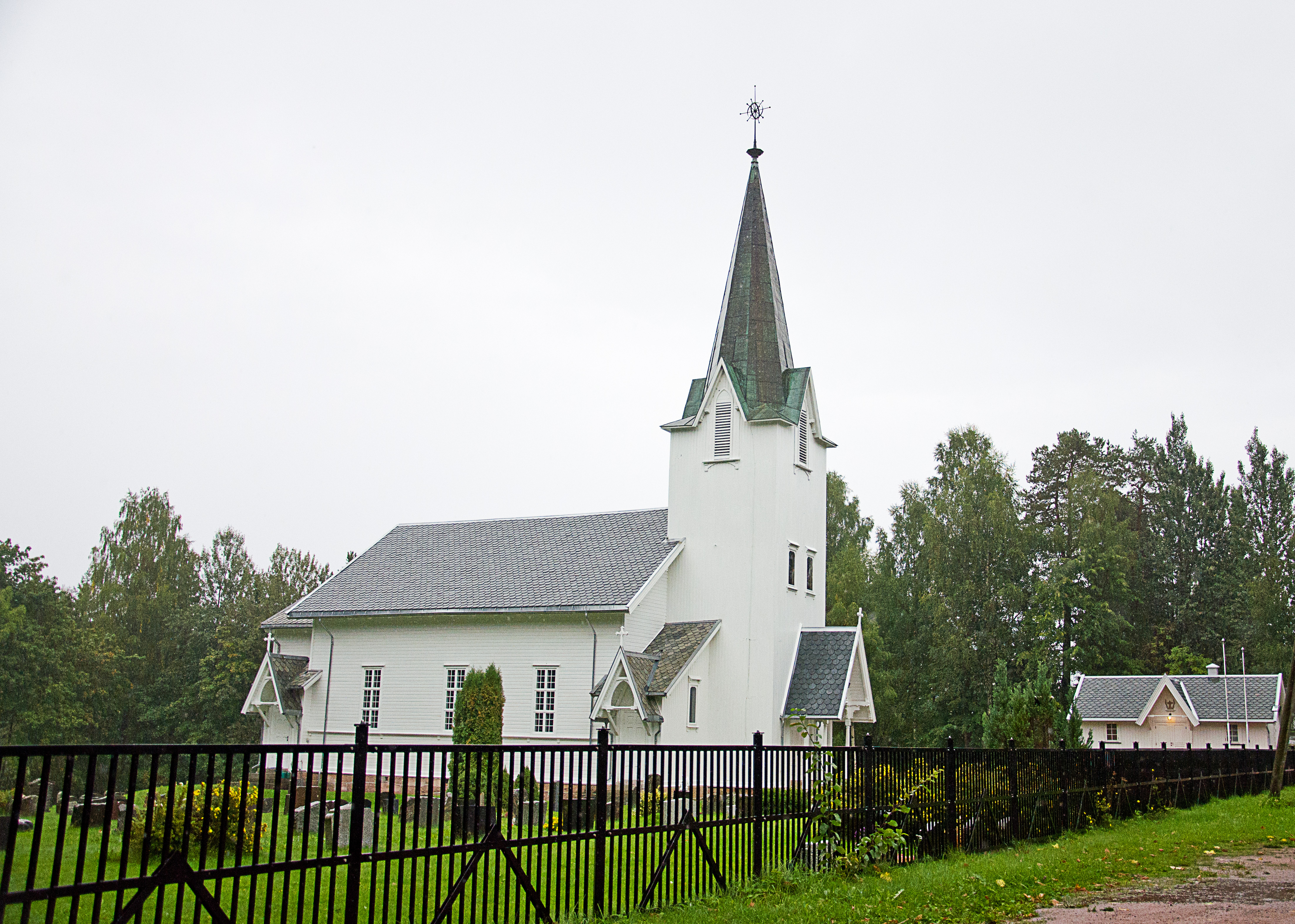

== See also ==
- List of churches in Tunsberg
