= Svelvik Church =

Church in Buskerud, Norway

- Svelvik kirke
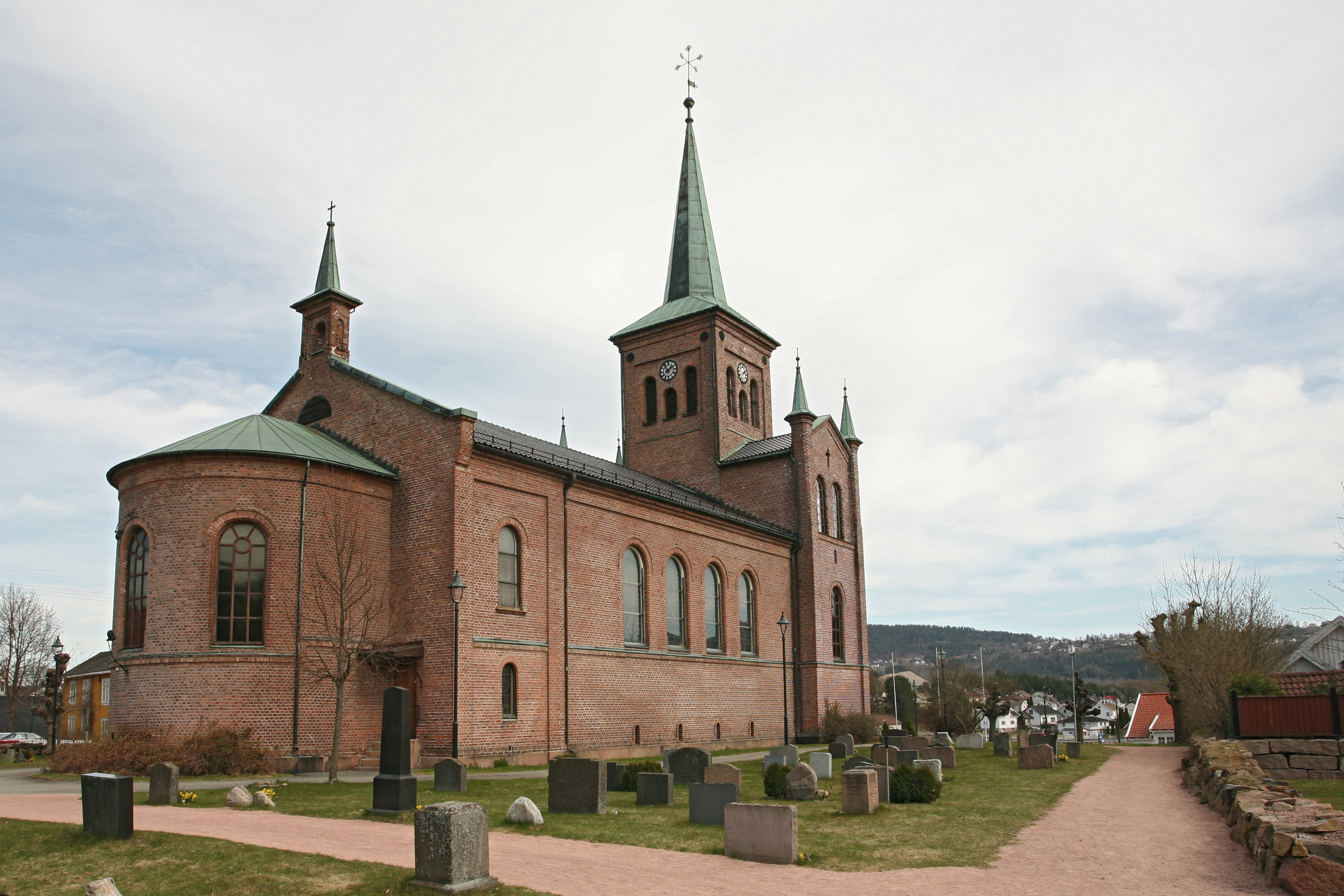
- View of the church
- Svelvik Church
- 59°36′49″N 10°24′29″E
- Location: Drammen Municipality, Buskerud
- Country: Norway
- Denomination: Church of Norway
- Previous denomination: Catholic Church
- Churchmanship: Evangelical Lutheran

History
- Status: Parish church
- Founded: c. 1150
- Consecrated: 7 Dec 1859

Architecture
- Functional status: Active
- Architect: Wilhelm Hanstein
- Architectural type: Long church
- Completed: 1859 (167 years ago)

Specifications
- Capacity: 450
- Materials: Brick

Administration
- Diocese: Tunsberg bispedømme
- Deanery: Drammen og Lier prosti
- Parish: Svelvik
- Norwegian Cultural Heritage Site
- Type: Church
- Status: Listed
- ID: 85013

Svelvik Church (Norwegian: Svelvik kirke) is a parish church of the Church of Norway in Drammen Municipality in Buskerud county, Norway. It is located in the town of Svelvik. It is one of the churches for the Svelvik parish which is part of the Drammen og Lier prosti (deanery) in the Diocese of Tunsberg. The brick church was built in a long church design in 1859 using plans drawn up by the architect Wilhelm Hanstein. The church seats about 450 people.

== History ==
The earliest existing historical records of the church date back to the year 1400, but the church was not built that year. The first church at Svelvik was probably built during the 1100s and it was known as the Strømm Church (the namesake for the Strømm prestegjeld and the old Strømm Municipality). The medieval church (dedicated to Saint Nicholas) was a Romanesque stone church that was an annex to the main Hurum Church. That church building was demolished in 1856.

After the old church was torn down, work on a new brick church was started on the same site. The new church was designed by Wilhelm Hanstein with Christian H. Grosch as consultant. It was consecrated on 7 December 1859. It is a rather unique church that has many features in common with Gothic Revival architecture, but the windows are round-arched. It is a brick long church with the main entrance facing east, which is clearly visible from the harbor. The choir apse thus faces west. The church received a tower clock in 1908, and it was replaced with a new one in 1959. The church was extensively restored in 1952 and again in 2018–2019.

== Media gallery ==

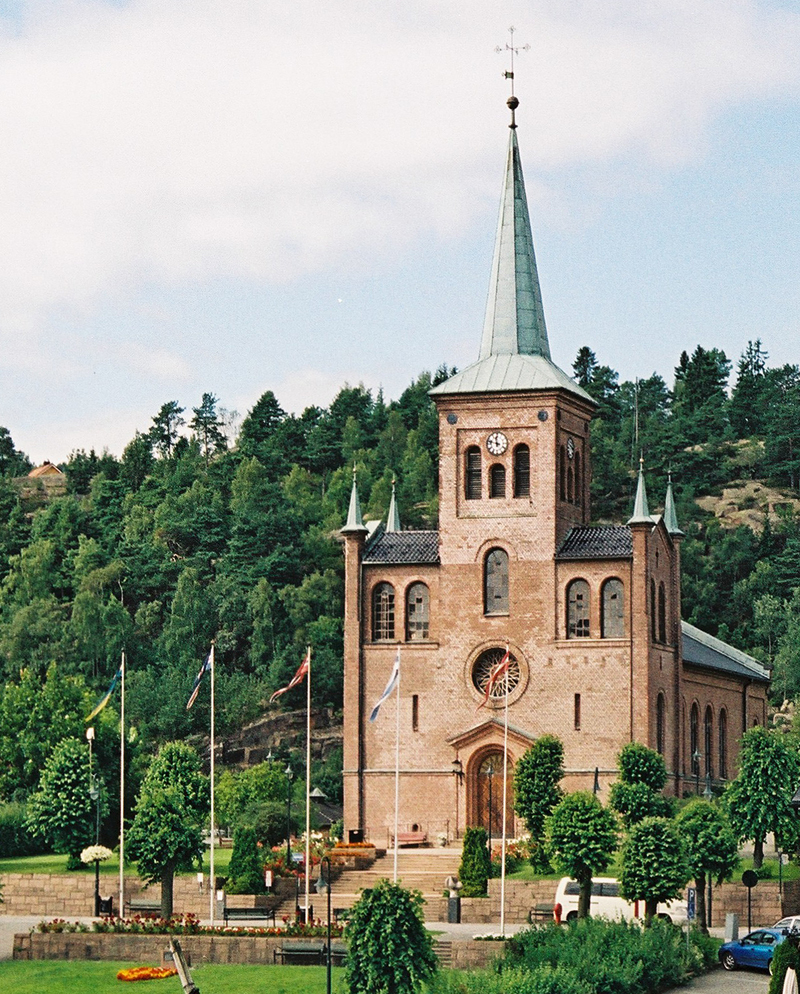

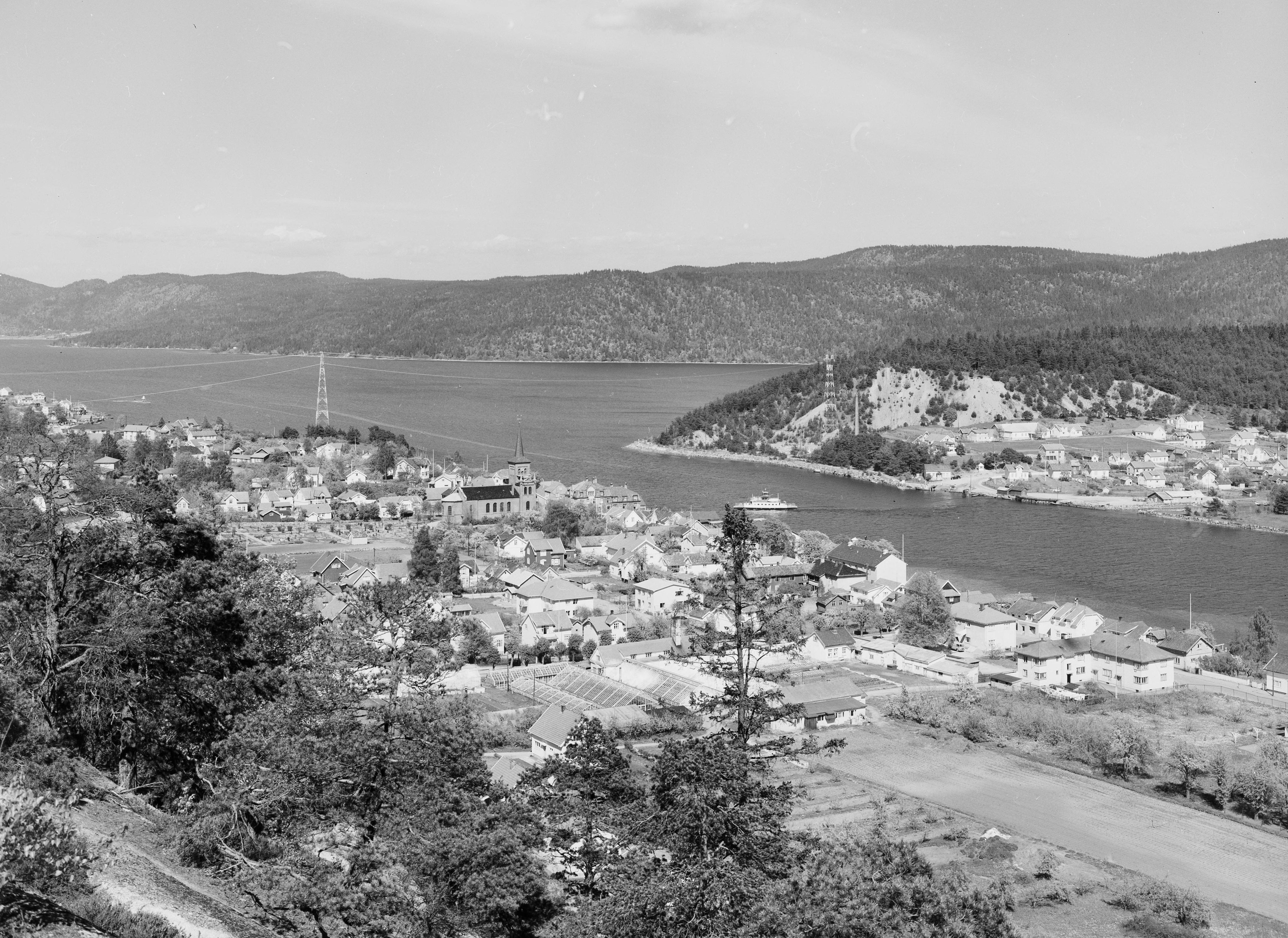

== See also ==
- List of churches in Tunsberg
