= Svelvik =

Town in Drammen, Norway

- Town/City
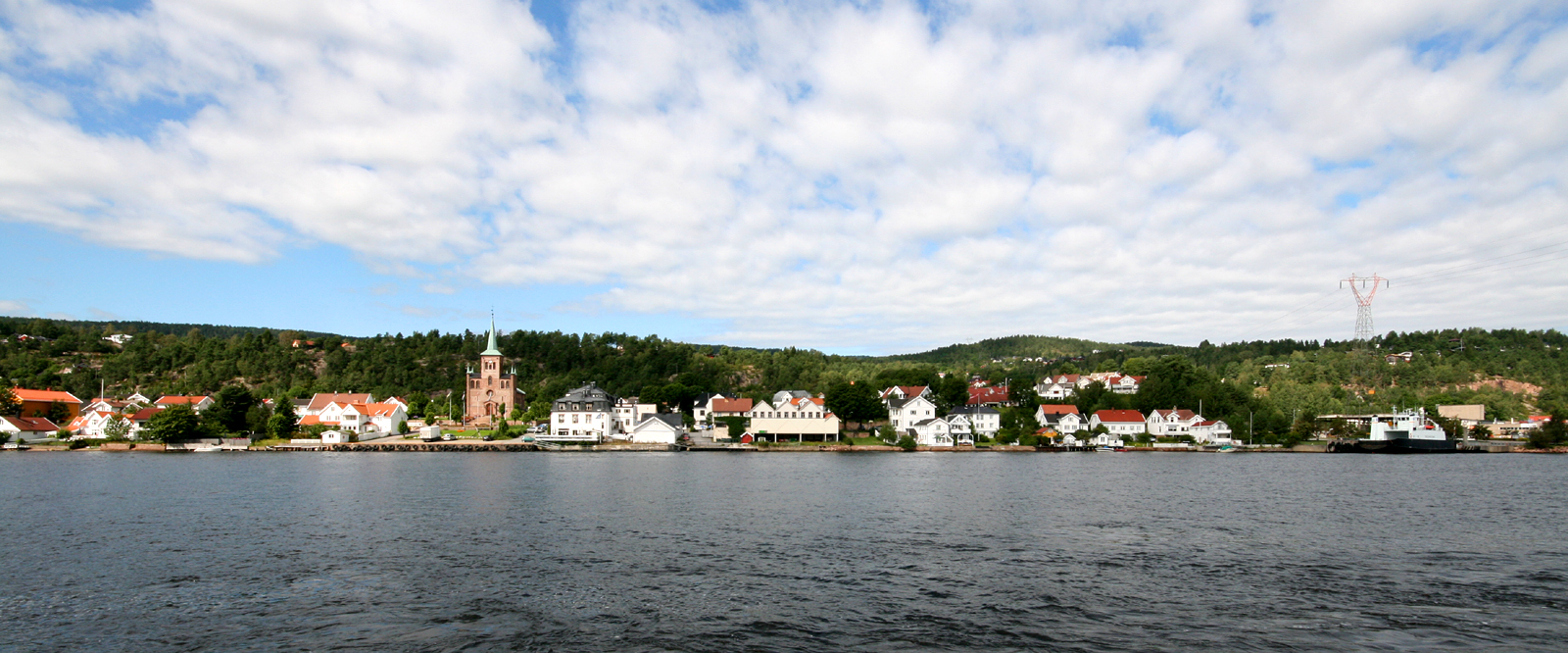
- View of the town

- Location of the town Svelvik (Norway)
- Coordinates: 59.61368°N 10.40875°E
- Country: Norway
- Region: Eastern Norway
- County: Buskerud
- Municipality: Drammen Municipality
- Established as
- Ladested: 1845

Area
  - Total: 2.33 km^{2} (0.90 sq mi)
- Elevation: 5 m (16 ft)

Population (2023)
  - Total: 4,256
  - Density: 1,825/km^{2} (4,730/sq mi)
- Demonym: Svelviking
- Time zone: UTC+01:00 (CET)
  - Summer (DST): UTC+02:00 (CEST)
- Post Code: 3060 Svelvik

Svelvik [ˈsvæ̀ɽviːk] is a town in Drammen Municipality in Buskerud county, Norway. The town is located along the west shore of the Drammensfjorden, about 20 kilometres (12 mi) to the southeast of the town of Drammen and about 8 kilometres (5.0 mi) north of the village of Berger. The village of Klokkarstua (in Asker Municipality) lies about 2 kilometres (1.2 mi) to the east, across the fjord.

The 2.33-square-kilometre (580-acre) town has a population (2023) of 4,256 and a population density of 1,825 inhabitants per square kilometre (4,730/sq mi). The town lies mostly in Drammen Municipality, but a small part of the urban area of Svelvik lies on the other side of the fjord (which is only 200 metres (660 ft) wide at that point). About 130 people live right across the fjord in Asker Municipality.

The newspaper Svelviksposten has been published in Svelvik since 1983.

== History ==
The town of Svelvik was established as a ladested on 1 January 1845 when it was separated from Strømm Municipality. Initially, the new town had a population of 1,201. The town was historically located in Jarlsberg og Laurvig county (present-day Vestfold county). Under the formannskapsdistrikt law, Svelvik was granted self-governing status as a municipality since it was a town. During the 1960s, there were many municipal mergers across Norway due to the work of the Schei Committee. On 1 January 1964, the town of Svelvik (population: 1,188) was merged with Strømm Municipality (population: 2,618) to form the new Svelvik Municipality. On 1 January 2020, Svelvik Municipality (population: 6,685) was merged into the neighboring Drammen Municipality (which made it switch from Vestfold to Viken county), so from then on, the town of Svelvik has been part of Drammen Municipality. On 1 January 2024, Viken county was dissolved and this area became part of Buskerud county.

=== Name ===
The municipality (originally the parish) is named after the old Svelvik farm (Old Norse: Sverðvík) since the first Svelvik Church was built there. The first element comes from the word sverð which means "sword". The last element is vík which means "bay" or "cove". The name "sword bay" is likely referring to the Ryggen promontory ridge across from the town of Svelvik. The ridge juts out into the Drammensfjorden like a sword and divides the fjord into two halves. The neighboring farm is called Sverstad (Norwegian: Sverðstaðir) which has the same etymology.

== Geography ==
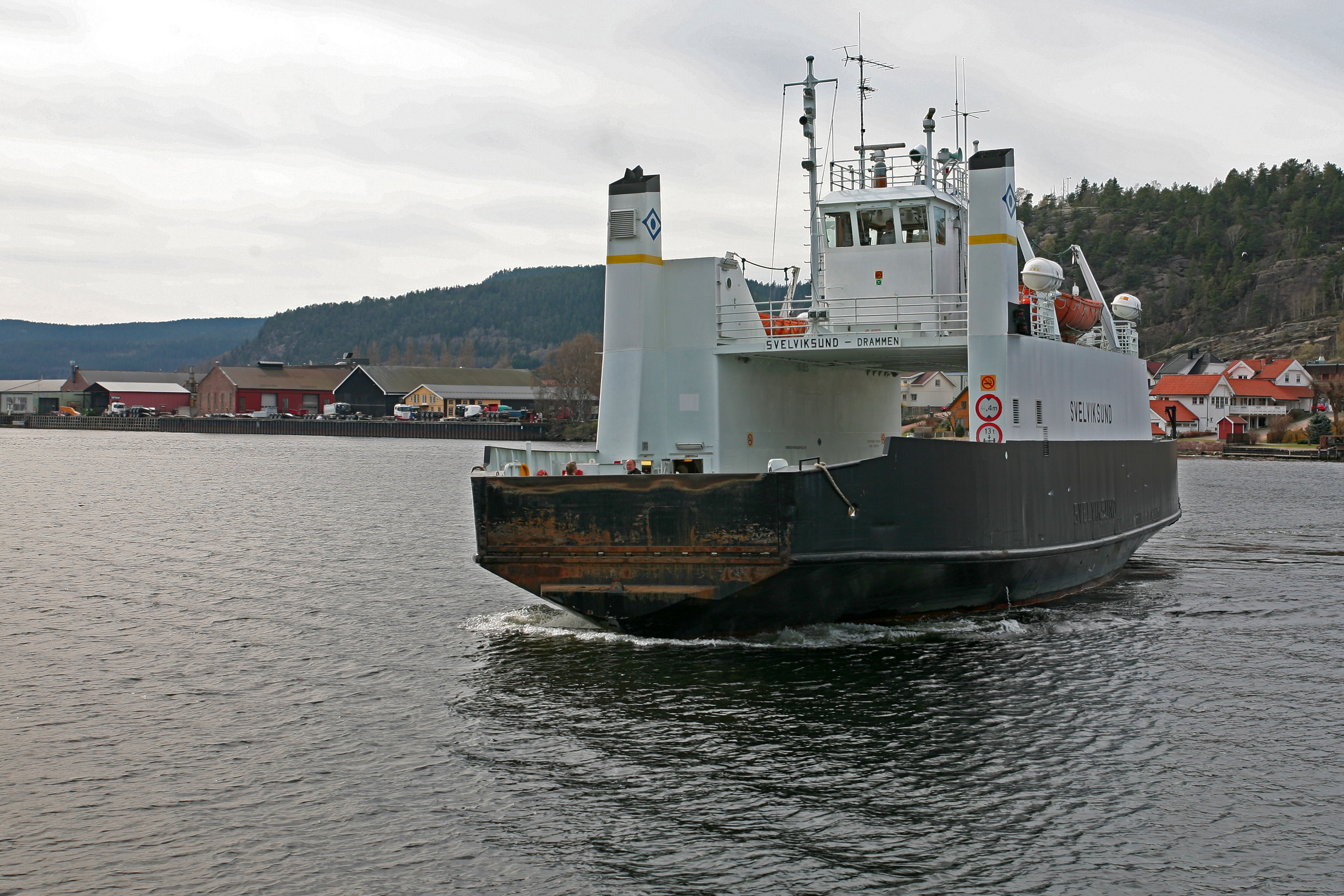
The ferry MF Svelviksund goes between Verket and Svelvik.

The town is located on the western shore of the Drammensfjorden. The narrow Svelvikstrømmen strait is located part-way along the fjord, near the town of Svelvik. The shortest ferry line in Norway crosses the fjord there, connecting Svelvik to the Hurum peninsula.

The little town has small, winding streets and traditional, white-painted houses. Svelvik has many venues for swimming and sunbathing.

== Climate ==
Climate data for Svelvik - Knem 2005-2020 (4 m)
Month	Jan	Feb	Mar	Apr	May	Jun	Jul	Aug	Sep	Oct	Nov	Dec	Year
Daily mean °C (°F)	−2.2 (28.0)	−2.0 (28.4)	1.0 (33.8)	5.8 (42.4)	11.0 (51.8)	15.0 (59.0)	17.6 (63.7)	16.5 (61.7)	12.5 (54.5)	6.9 (44.4)	2.6 (36.7)	−1.3 (29.7)	7.0 (44.5)
Average precipitation mm (inches)	71 (2.8)	55 (2.2)	57 (2.2)	69 (2.7)	73 (2.9)	83 (3.3)	74 (2.9)	101 (4.0)	107 (4.2)	135 (5.3)	111 (4.4)	88 (3.5)	1,024 (40.3)
Source: yr.no (mean, precipitation)

== Media gallery ==
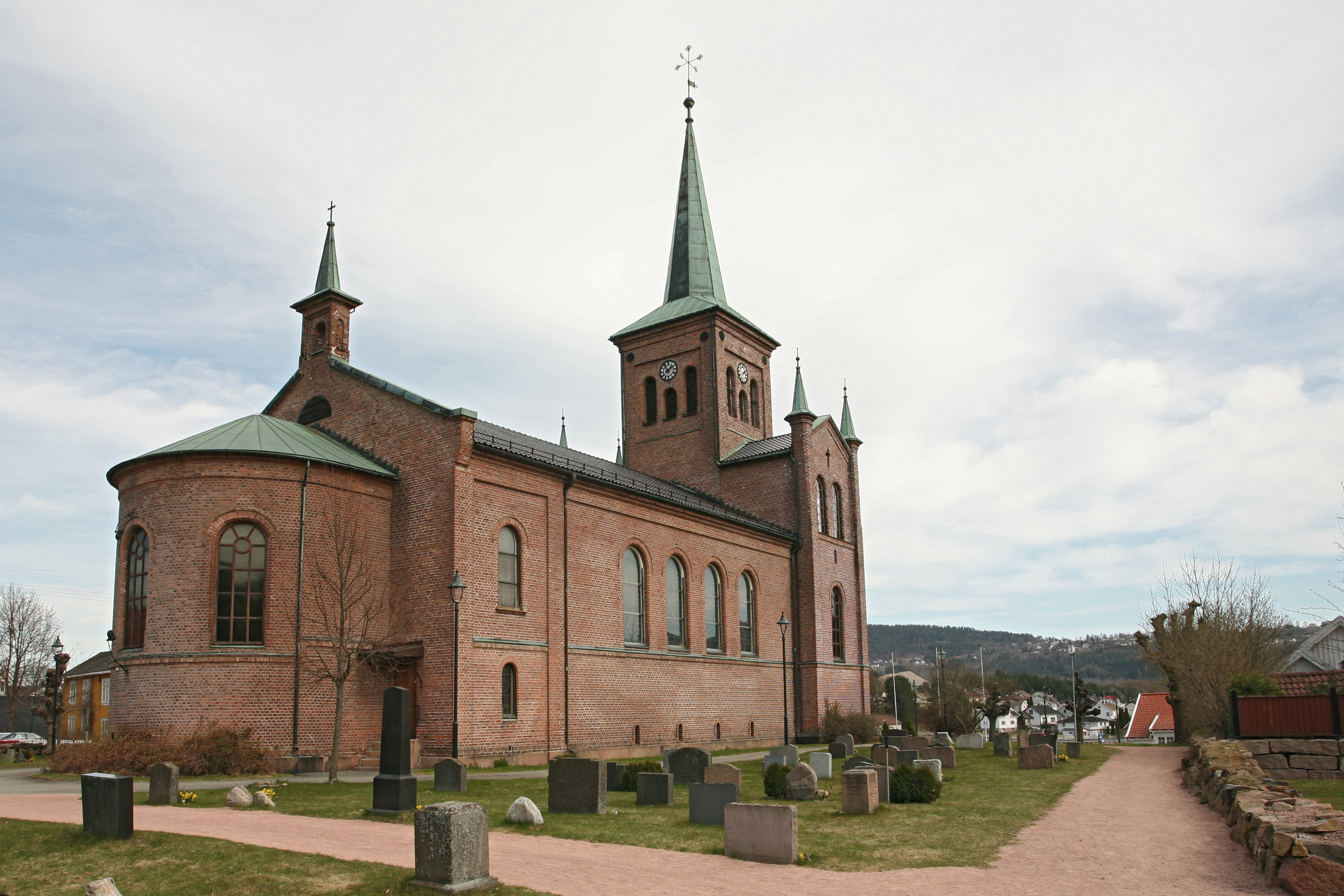
Svelvik Church is the church in Svelvik, built in 1859 with seating for 450.

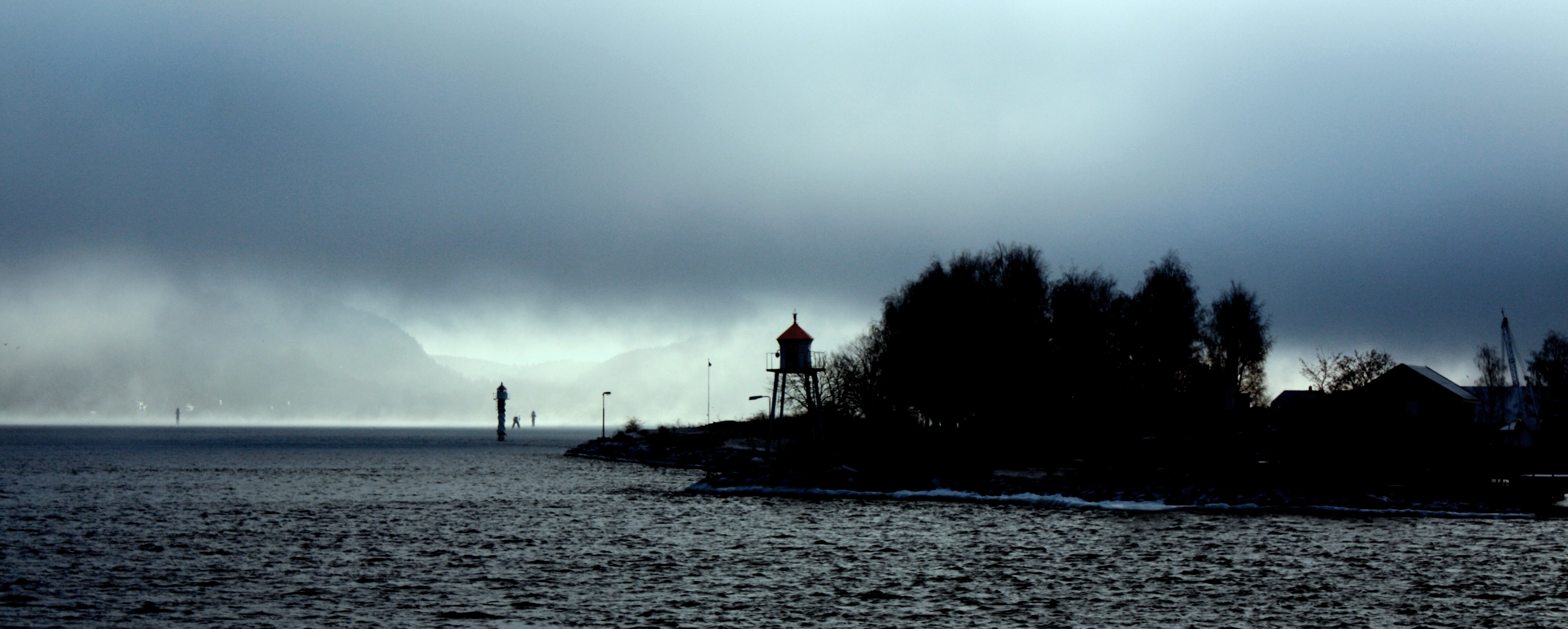
View from the fjord (Jan 2009)
Credit: Håvard Selby Ebbestad

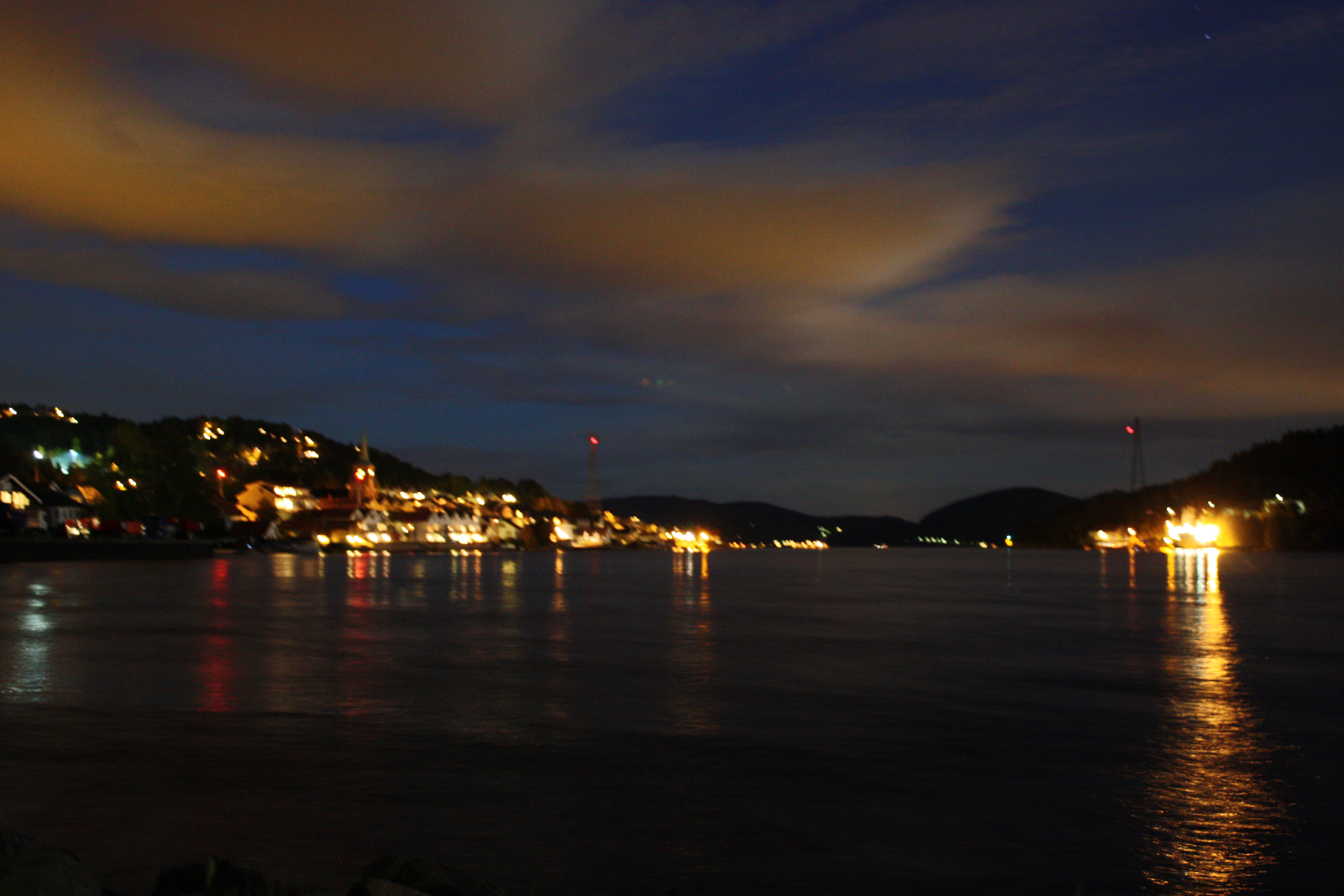
Oktober evening by the Svelvikstrømmen
Credit: Håvard Selby Ebbestad

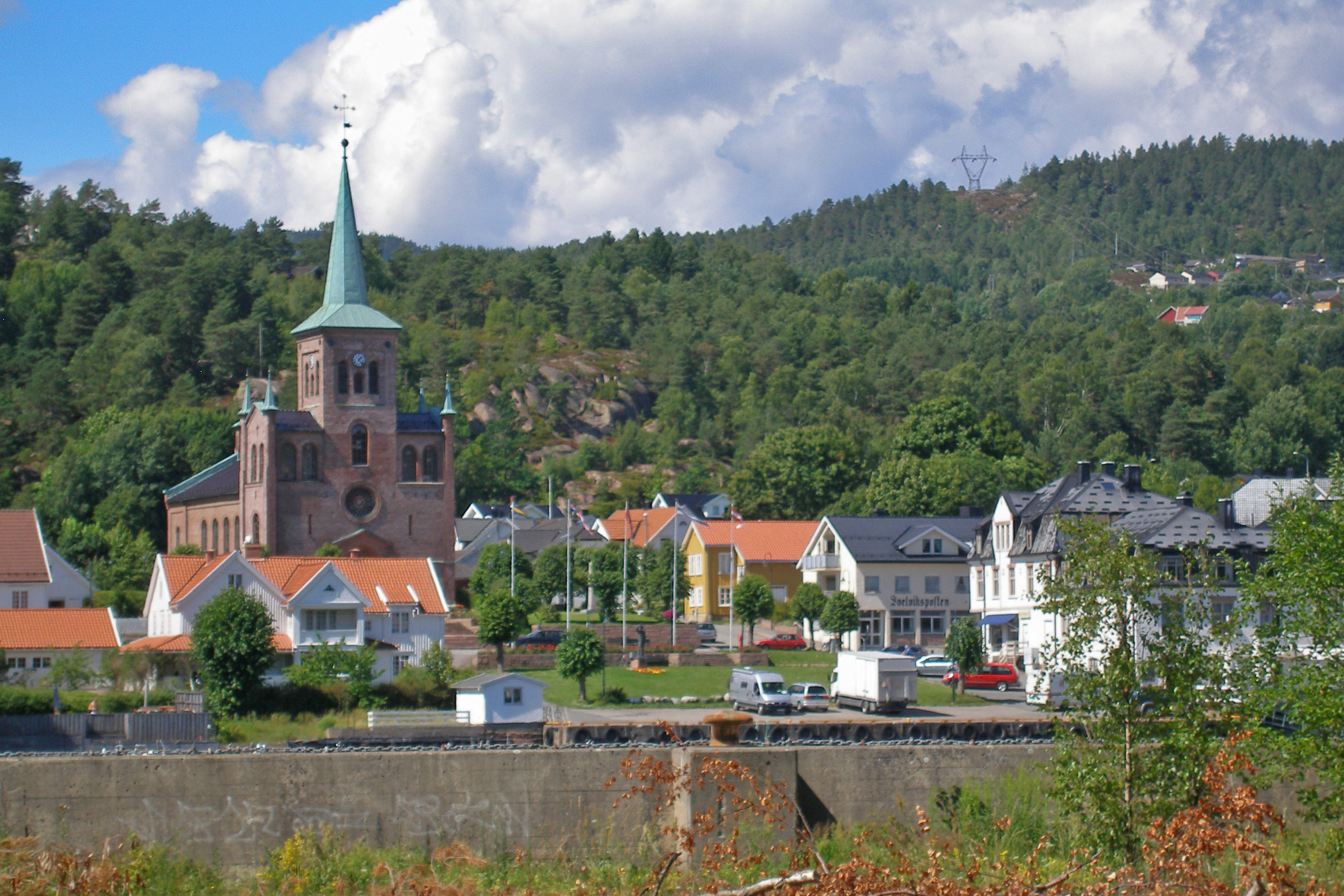
View of the town from the fjord

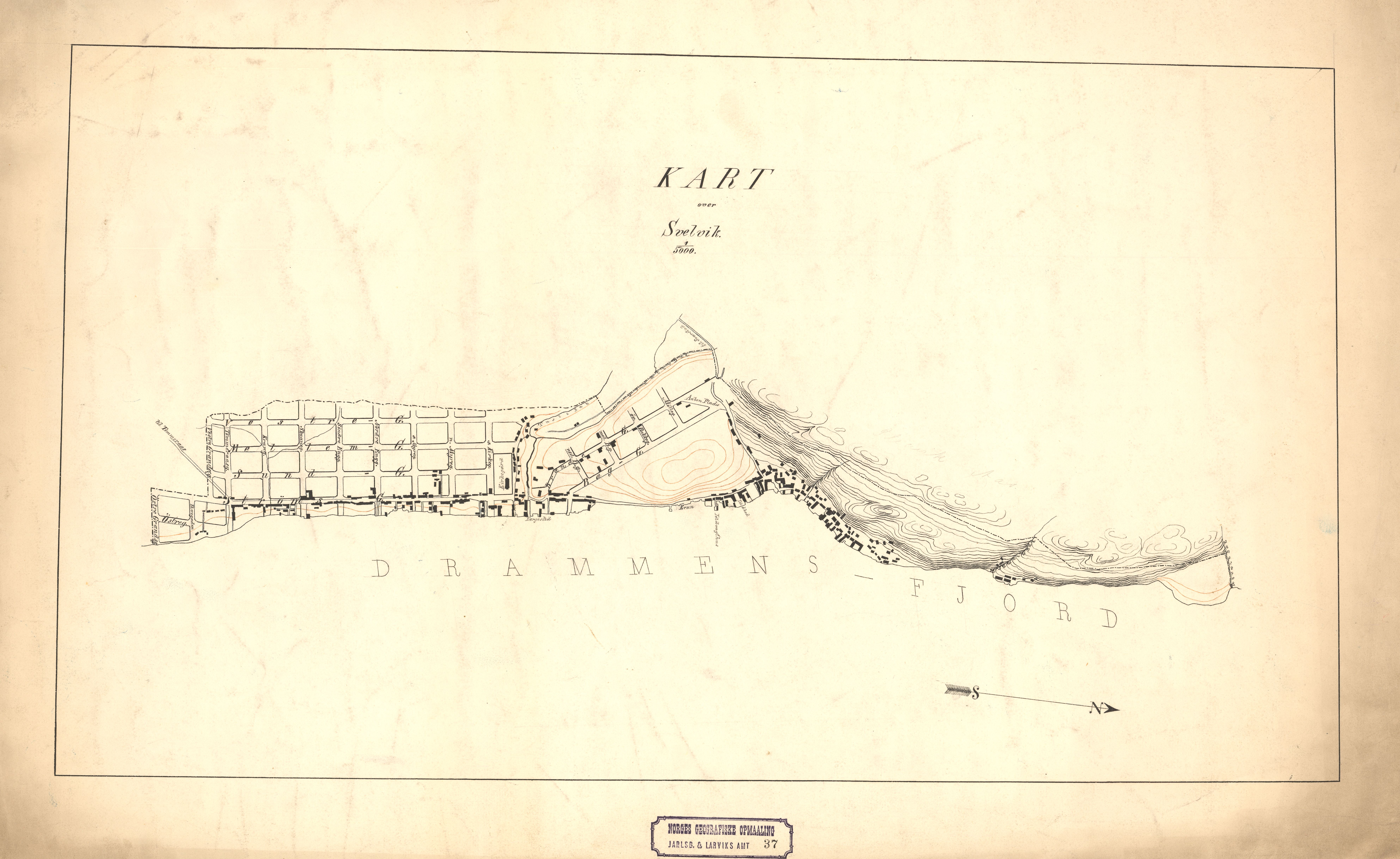
Map of the town from 1870

== See also ==
- List of towns and cities in Norway
