= Hurum Church =

Medieval stone church in Norway

Coordinates: 59°36′53″N 10°27′34″E

Hurum Church is a medieval stone church in Hurum, Norway. It was constructed in the 12th century. The church was damaged by fire in 1686, and rebuilt with a baroque interior. Next to the church, the Huitfeldt family built a wooden funeral chapel in the second half of the 17th century. A new stone chapel was built in 1750, and contains the remains of the naval commander Iver Huitfeldt.

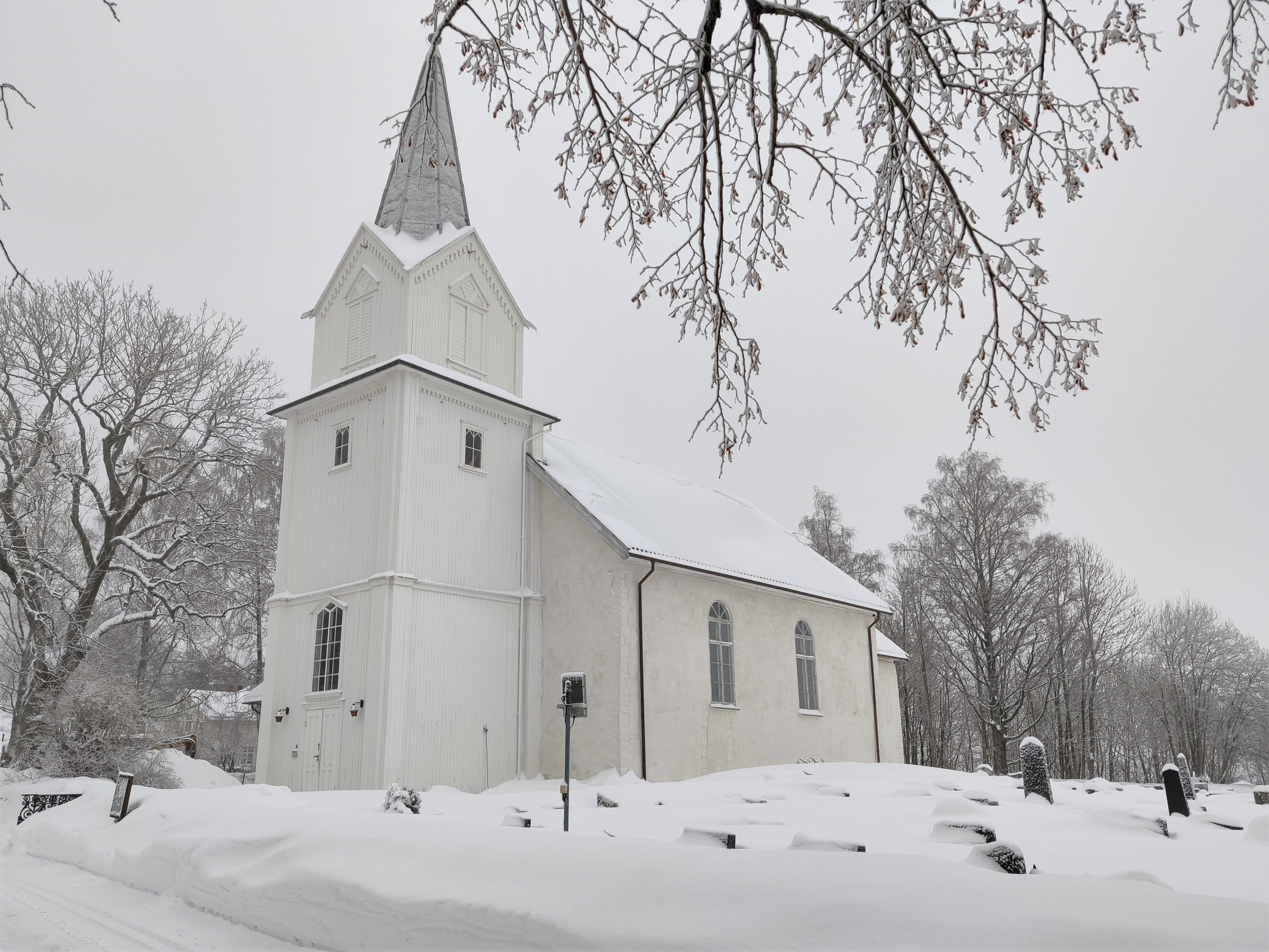
Hurum medieval church, view towards north-east. The lower part of the tower was built in 1849, with the spire being added in 1885.

== The medieval church on Hov ==
In the medieval period, Hurum church was called Hóvs kirkia á Huðrimum (Hov's church on Hurum). The church is monumentally situated on a morraine ridge, 180 meters above the Drammensfjord. It was dedicated to the blessed Virgin Mary on July 12, but was re-dedicated to St. Margareth on July 19 in the late 14th century. The parish of the church was called Hófs sokn á Huðrimum (Hov's parish on Hurum), and the church was built on the property of the farm Hov. The name of the farm indicates that this also was a place of pagan worship in pre-Christian times. A stave church was probably built before the present stone church on the same spot. The church is situated on a little bump in the terrain, which may be the remains of a destroyed burial mound. Several such mounds lie along the road to the farm Hov, south of the church. One of these contained a 9th-century burial in a boat. Between the gates of the churchyard and the tower, excavations have revealed a possible monolith and a posthole dated to 770-880 AD. Earlier (at least until 1798) there also existed a larger complex of stone monoliths from pagan times immediately south of the churchyard. The stone wall enclosing the churchyard is older than 1629. Two medieval cruciform-shaped headstones of soapstone stood on the churchyard until 1972. Archaeological excavations in 2010 revealed 11 medieval graves beneath and in front of the foot of the tower.

== Date of construction ==
The present stone church is a romanesque building from the early medieval period. The precise date of construction is unknown. Hov's parish is mentioned for the first time in 1317. A medieval grave in front of the foot of the tower is C-14-dated to 1070–1130 AD, but may be older than the building. In 1188/1190 earl Eirik, the brother of king Sverri Sigurdsson, donated Hov to Hovedøya monastery in Oslo, and at that time the church was probably already built. Traditionally the church has been dated to c. 1150, but it may be either some decades older or younger than that.

It is very likely that it was the owner of Hov, Hurum's largest farm in the medieval period, that initiated the construction of a stone-church on his land. Building in stone was expensive, and a demonstration of power and wealth. The size of the church indicates that it was intended to be used as a parochial church right from the beginning, and not as a private chapel. Farmers in the area are therefore likely to have contributed to the construction as well. The importance of the farm Hov was probably due to its strategically significant location by the tidal currents of the narrow Svelvik stream, which enabled it to control the passage between the Oslofjord and the Drammensfjord.

== Owners of the church ==
Around the year 1400, the property registers of bishop Eystein recorded that Hov's church owned property in 45 different farms, and was fairly well off. After the reformation of the church of Denmark-Norway in 1537 the Crown confiscated the church's properties. In 1723 the church was sold to the chancellor's secretary Nicolai Scwartz on Buskerud in Modum, and the following year from him to the widow of the sea hero Iver Huitfeldt, Kirsten Røyem on Tronstad in Hurum. At the auction of her estate after her death in 1750, the church was bought by Gustav Blom in Holmsbu and Knud Borch in Selvik. In 1770 the legal secretary and publican Johan Blom in Drammen became sole owner of the church. The congregation bought the church from him in 1816, and has owned it since then.

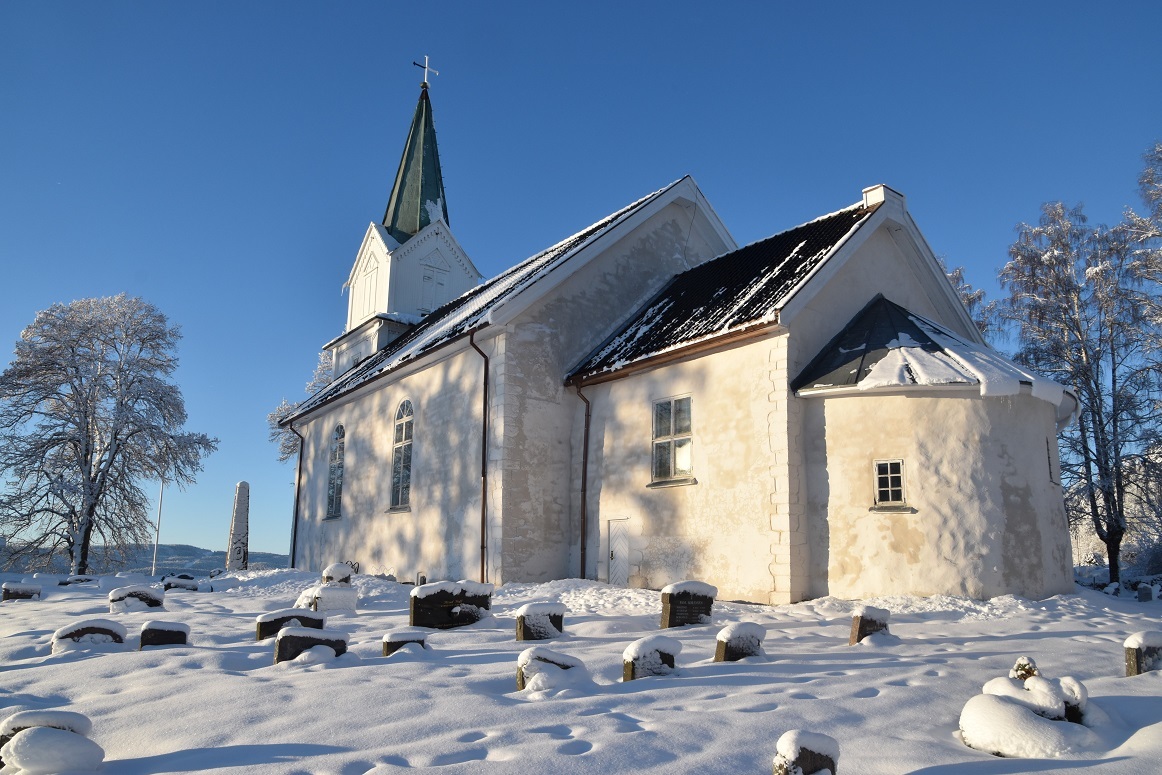
The church and churchyard viewed towards north-west. The apse is the best preserved part of the medieval building.

== The church building ==
The church has a rectangular nave and a nearly quadratic chancel, which is rounded off by the semi-circular apse in the east. The stone walls are between 1.5–2 meters thick, and covered in white lime plaster. On the outside, the corners are decorated with quaderstone. Beneath the western window on the southern wall there is a closed portal with remains of a decorated profile on both sides of the arch. There is also a smaller portal in the south wall of the chancel. The main entrance of the church, the western portal, was completely rebuilt in 1849. Before the fire in 1686 there was a wooden hallway in front of the portal. The small window in the apse is medieval. The stained glass window depicting the Good Shepherd was painted by Per Vigeland, and was given to the church in 1953. It is likely that the chancel too had a medieval window, but the present window is from the 18th century. The windows of the nave were added in 1849. In the medieval period the arch between the nave and the chancel was approximately 2.4 meters wide, resulting in a more marked separation between the two rooms. The roof of the chancel was decorated with cloud paintings from the early 18th century. In the medieval period the church had murals that were destroyed in the fire. The vestry was constructed in 1957 by architect Esben Poulsson. Between 1885 and 1957 the apse was used as a vestry, with a dividing wall against the chancel.

== Tomb beneath the chancel ==
Beneath the floor of the chancel there is a 2.4m long and 1.6m wide burial chamber from the medieval period, with brick walls and a barrel vault. In front of the chamber there is a narrow passage leading up to the floor. In the earth fillings above the tomb, 26 medieval coins have been excavated. The earliest dates to the period 1205–1263, while eight coins date from the period 1263–1280. This indicates that the tomb was constructed in the late 13th century. Originally it was probably constructed for the owner of the church, but in the beginning of the 17th century the immigrated Danish nobleman Anders Huitfeldt (c. 1555–1620) and his wife Margrethe Pedersdatter Litle (c. 1557–1602) were buried here. Their epitaph is said to have hung in the chancel, but was destroyed in the fire.

== Tower and churchbells ==
In the 17th century, and probably earlier as well, the bells hung in a ridgeturret on the roof of the nave. It blew down in a storm, and was rebuilt in 1770. The ridgeturret was dismantled in 1849, and the roof was lowered by over one meter. At the same time the first western turret was constructed, with a pitched roof. The congregation were not satisfied with the roof of the turret, which they compared with a nightcap. It was therefore rebuilt in 1885, when the present tall spire was added. The great bell was cast in Christiania in 1695 by Friederich Kessler. The small bell was cast in Amsterdam in 1725 by Jan Albert de Grave, and was given to the church by vicar Frantz Bache's mother, Helena Heiberg.

== Organ and galleries ==
In 1694 galleries were constructed along the northern and western walls. They were rebuilt, and a gallery on the southern wall was added in 1849. The galleries on the long walls were removed in 1908, and the facade of the organ gallery was rebuilt. The first organ of the church was an instrument with 6 voices, built in 1865 by Isak Olsen Engh in the attic of the old glass factory at Verket. It is now in Drammen museum. Parts of the organ prospect were kept on the new instrument with 10 voices, that was installed in 1954.

== The great Christmas day fire of 1686 ==
After the Christmas Day mass in 1686, sexton Jens Christensen forgot to extinguish the candles on the altar. During the night they burned down and set fire to the altar and the altarcloth, which next set fire to the floor and the roof of the chancel. The fire was discovered by Erik Pedersen Stokker about three hours before dawn, when he went outside to relieve himself after a night of Christmas celebrations at Klokkarstua. He woke the sexton, and they entered the church and rang the bell to summon help. However, there blew a strong wind that night, and in just a couple of hours the church was beyond saving. Only the masonry was left, together with two medieval candlesticks that were on lease to the church in Strømmen. The church was put to use again in 1694, after 7 years of reconstruction.

== Altarpieces ==
Through the ages, the church has had several altarpieces. Immediately after the 1686 fire a small, new altarpiece was given to the church by sheriff Iver Hvid at Strømsø. It was soon replaced with a large and splendid altarpiece carved by boatbuilder Stillef Tollefsen Auke from Strømmen in 1697, and donated to the church by merchant Christen Evensen Hannevig at Bragernes. This altarpiece was dismantled in 1849, and donated to Norsk Folkemuseum in 1858. Between 1849 and 1885 the church did not have an altarpiece, just a crucifix on the altar, as today. In 1885 a large painting of the resurrection was hung on the dividing wall between the chancel and the apse. During the restoration works in 1952 the painting was taken down, and is now located in the funeral chapel. The crucifix that now is standing on the altar replaced the painting. It is a copy of a medieval crucifix from Glemmen church in Østfold.

== Font and the baptismal tablet ==
The font is shaped in the form of a child or an angel in loincloth, carrying the basin over its head. It was carved in the first decades of the 18th century by an unknown artist. A font was given to the church by Bent Svendsen Selvik and his wife before 1708, but it is uncertain whether this is the same font. It is possible that it dates to the 1720s, and was carved by the master of the baptismal tablet. The baptismal bowl was given by the widow of vicar Christen Gregersen, Anne Iversdatter, immediately after the fire in 1687. The can for the baptismal water was given by Susanna Blom in 1726.

The baptismal tablet was given as an adornment to the church in 1726 by Bernt Thomassen Åsgård and his wife Karen Abrahamsdatter Selvik. It has the mirror monogram of king Frederik IV on its top. The inscription reads as follows:

"God father, Son and Spirit, in whose name we are baptized; by Jesus’ blood on the cross the Grace is bought for us; when the water is poured on, the sins are immediately forgiven for the children whose faith grasps onto Jesus. By the well-regarded man Bernt Thomassen Åsgård and the virtuous mother Karen Abrahamsdatter is this tablet is given and installed in the year 1726."

== Pulpit ==
After the 1686 fire, the church acquired an old pulpit from Ås church in Follo. It was soon replaced by today's pulpit, given by Kirsten Røyem some time during the early 1700s. It is a masterpiece of the baroque acanthus style, which became high fashion in Norway after Oslo cathedral was decorated in this style in 1697. The pulpit was replaced by a simpler pulpit in 1849, but was restored in 1908. In the meantime it had lost its ceiling, and a new one was made. The restoration is not quite correctly executed. Amongst other things, the acanthus leaves on the portal are growing upside down, the angels in the apse have probably belonged to the pulpit, and the colours are not original.

== Other inventory ==
The chalice and its plate was made by goldsmith Bagge Lauritzen on Strømsø in 1689. He probably worked in the workshop of Hans Nieman the older, and his son, Hans Nieman the younger, made a chalice and plate for sick visits and the box for communion bread, which since have been lost. The bible on the altar is the edition of king Christian IV from 1633. Three sets of tin candlesticks are also standing on the altar. The pair in the middle are late medieval. The largest pair were made in the 18th century, while the smallest pair is of modern date.

== Chasubles ==
The church has two magnificent chasubles in its custody. The oldest, with red velvet and gold embroideries, was given to the church by Kirsten Huitfeldt before 1750. In connection with the 300 year commemoration of the death of Iver Huitfeldt, the church was also given a white chasuble shaped by the recognized textile designer Lise Skjåk Bræk.

== The Huitfeldt funeral chapel ==
Colonel Tønne Huitfeldt built a funeral chapel for himself and his family somewhere north of the church in the 1660s. It was damaged by the fire in 1686, but the coffins were saved, and placed in a new funeral chapel constructed on the same spot. Just before she died in 1750, Kirsten Røyem decided to build a new funeral chapel. It is built in the classical style, with two cross vaults. The cellar beneath the chapel was dug out in the late 1940s. Today 18 coffins are placed in the chapel, and about 40 coffins are placed in the cellar. This is one of the largest and oldest collection of coffins in Norway. In the middle of the room Iver Huitfeldt's sarcophagus is placed, flanked by two old banner poles with Norwegian and Danish flags. He was killed when the ship he commanded exploded in the course of the battle of Køgebugt in 1710. A model of this ship was presented to the church as a votive church-ship in 1962 by the Køge Naval Society. It replaced an older ship from the 1700s, which now can be seen at Norsk Folkemuseum.

== General and cited references ==
- Busland, Hans Andreas Kristoffersen. 1902. Hurum før og nu. Christiania.
- Christie, Håkon & Christie, Sigrid. 1986. Norges kirker - Buskerud - bd. II. Oslo.
- Eier, Sigfred Loe. 1963. Hurums historie bd. I. Bygdehistorie inntil 1807. Halden.
- Eier, Sigred Loe. 1969. Hurums historie bd. II. 1807-1940. Halden.
- Johnsen, Oscar Albert. 1903. Hurum før og nu. Christiania.
- Lorvik, Katarina. 2010. Hurum kirke 3 - 2010. Arkeologisk overvåkning av grøft for sprinkleranlegg. Hurum kirke, Buskerud (ID 84662). NIKU Oppdragsrapport 179/2010.
- Sellevold, Berit. 2011. Skjelettfunn fra middelalder og nyere tid fra Hurum kirke, Hurum k., Buskerud. NIKU Rapport Osteoarkeologiske undersøkelser 286/2011.
- Norsk numismatisk årbok 1973, Universitetets myntkabinett, Oslo.
