= Hurum =

Hurum Municipality Hurum kommune
- Municipality
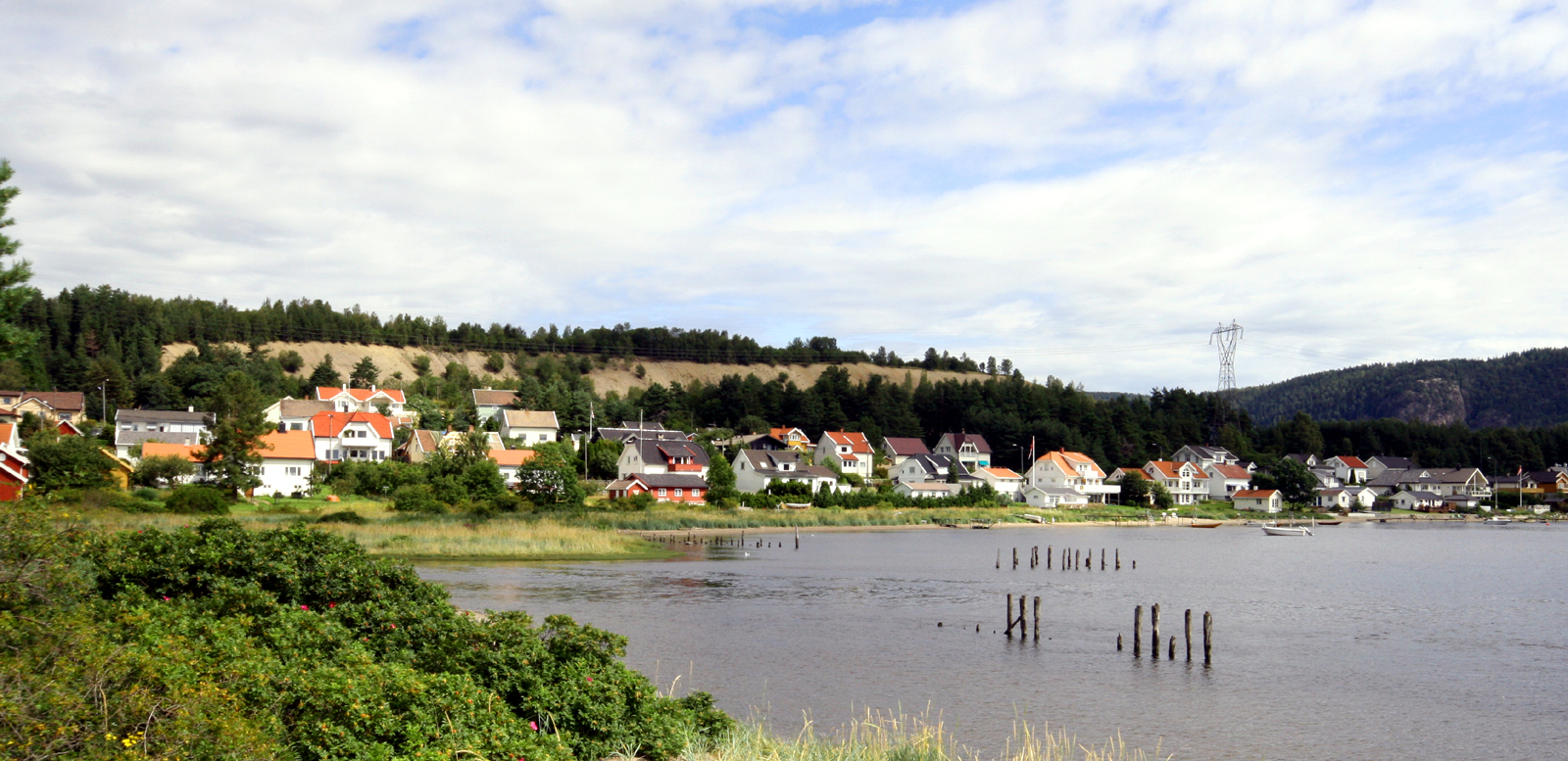

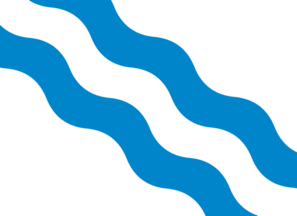
- Flag Coat of arms

- Buskerud within Norway

- Hurum within Buskerud
- Coordinates: 59°36′11″N 10°31′5″E
- Country: Norway
- County: Buskerud
- District: Lower Buskerud
- Administrative centre: Sætre

Government
  - Mayor (2011): Monica Vee Bratli (H)

Area
  - Total: 163 km^{2} (63 sq mi)
  - Land: 156 km^{2} (60 sq mi)
  - Rank: #354 in Norway

Population (2015)
  - Total: 9 365
  - Rank: #120 in Norway
  - Density: 56/km^{2} (150/sq mi)
  - Change (10 years): ▲ +11.5%
- Demonym: Huring or Høring

Official language
  - Norwegian form: Bokmål
- Time zone: UTC+01:00 (CET)
  - Summer (DST): UTC+02:00 (CEST)
- ISO 3166 code: NO-0628
- Website: Official website

Hurum was a municipality in Buskerud county, Norway. As of 1 January 2020 Hurum has merged with the municipalities of Røyken and Asker to form the new Asker Municipality located in the newly formed Viken county. The administrative centre of the municipality is the village Sætre. The municipality of Hurum was established on 1 January 1838 (see formannskapsdistrikt). The small village of Holmsbu was granted town status in 1847, but it did not become a municipality of its own. It lost its town status on 1 January 1964.

Hurum was once suggested as the location for the new national airport of Norway. The plan was, however, abandoned, due to fears of too much fog in Hurum, and the main airport is now situated at Gardermoen in Akershus.

== Etymology ==
=== Name ===
The Old Norse form of the name was Húðrimar. The meaning of the first element (Húð) is unknown and the last element is the plural form of rimi which means "ridge".

=== Coat-of-arms ===
The coat-of-arms is from modern times. They were granted on 2 February 1979. The arms show two blue wavy lines on a silver background. This was chosen because the municipality is on a peninsula between two fjords: Oslofjord and Drammensfjord. At the same time the arms are based on the arms of the Huitfeldt family, who played a major role in the local history. The family used a single bend as arms.

Number of minorities (1st and 2nd generation) in Hurum by country of origin in 2017
Ancestry	Number
Poland	230
Lithuania	146
Germany	89
Sweden	65
Denmark	62
Syria	40
Somalia	39
UK	36

== History ==
Hurum was the site of the Hurum air disaster on 20 November 1949.

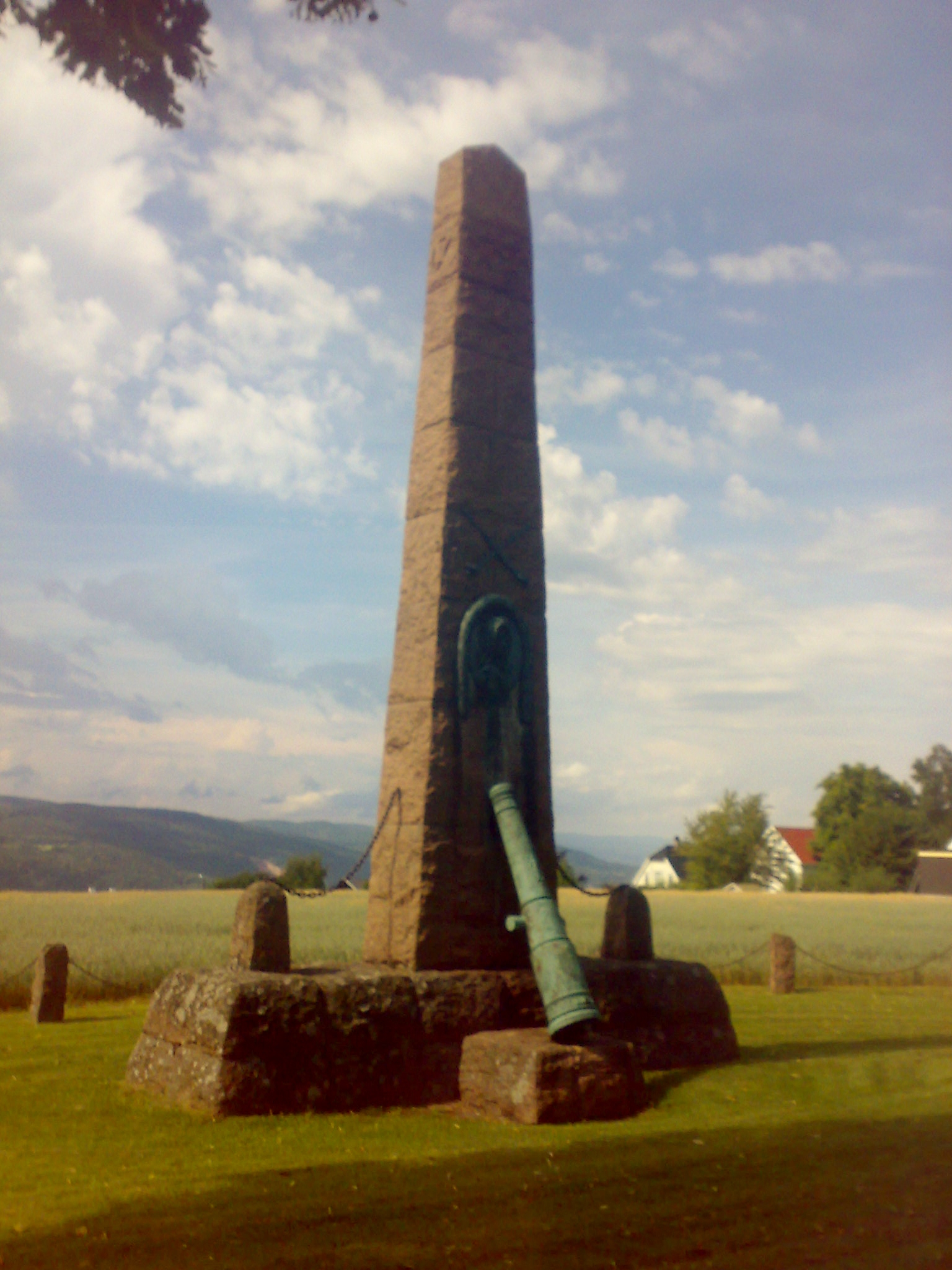
Monument to Admiral Ivar Huitfeldt

== Geography ==
The municipality borders Røyken to the north. To the west the coastline is located close to the eastern coast of Vestfold with Svelvik. It is connected to the eastern side of the Oslofjord via Oslofjordtunnel, one of the longest undersea tunnels of its kind in Northern Europe. The tunnel is 7.2 kilometres (4.5 mi) long and connects Hurumhalvøya to Akershus county.

Hurum is located on the southern part of Hurumhalvøya, which is the peninsula between the Oslofjord and Drammensfjord. The administrative centre is the village of Sætre, which together with Tofte are one of the two most populated villages in Hurum.

== Churches in Hurum ==
- Filtvet Church
- Holmsbu Church
- Kongsdelene Church
- Hurum Church

== Hurum Church ==
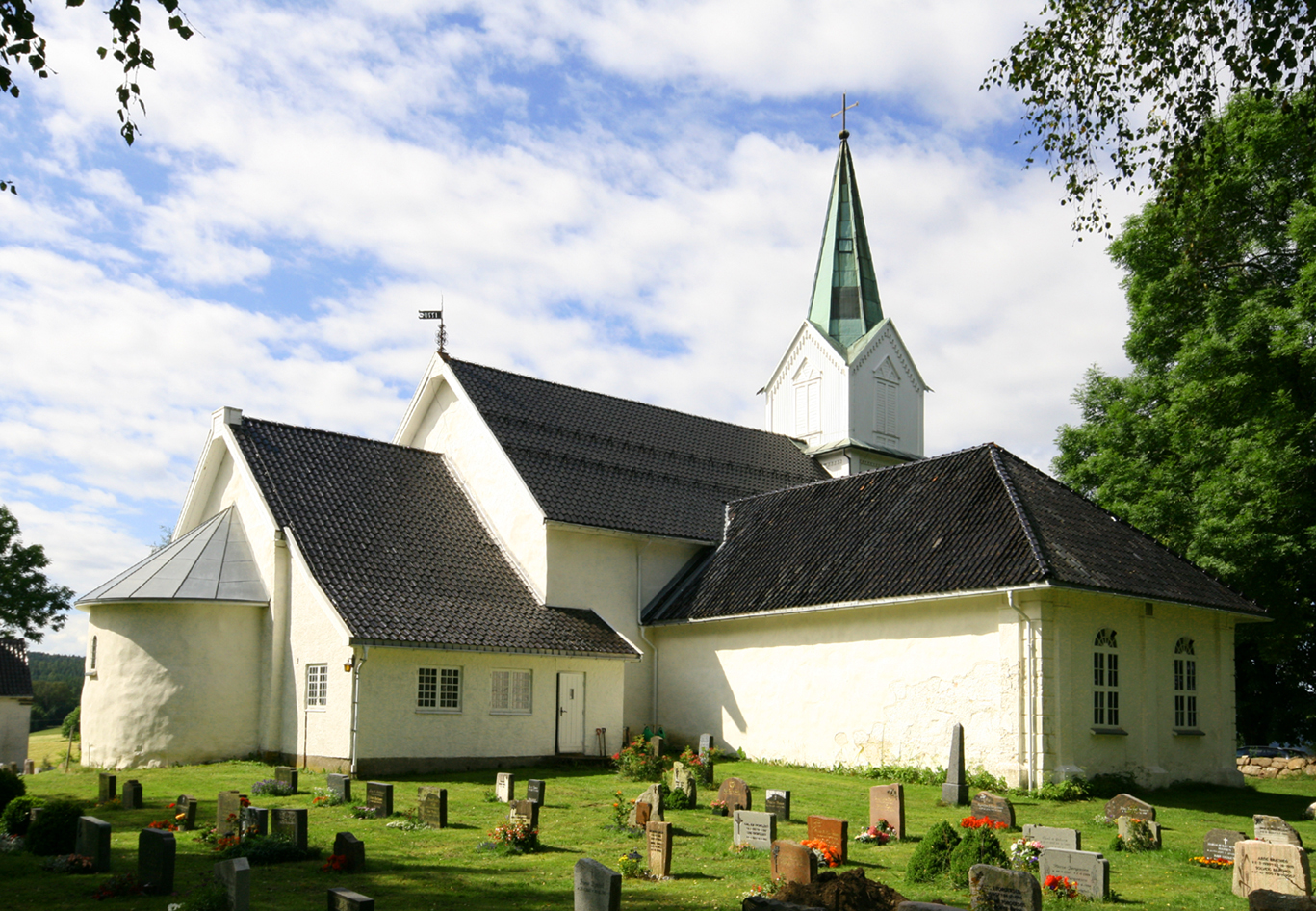
Hurum Church

Hurum Church (Hurum kirke) is the parish church for Hurum. This is a medieval era church dating from ca. 1150. The edifice is constructed of stone and has 150 seats. The original church was ravaged by fire the night after Christmas Day 1686. The following year the church received a new roof and turret. In 1849 the church was extensively rebuilt. The interior has undergone a number of changes in the course of time. The cemetery is surrounded by stone wall and has a chapel from 1938. Naval hero and native son, Ivar Huitfeldt (1665-1710) was buried in the church yard. The pulpit was received as a gift from his wife, Kirsten Røyem Huitfeldt (1671–1750).

== Merging and dissolution ==
On 9 May 2016, a referendum on the status of the municipality was held, with a majority of voters voting to merge Hurum with Røyken and Asker to create a new and larger Asker. Subsequently, on 21 June the same year, a majority of municipal councillors voted in favor of applying for the merger, which was subsequently accepted by the local councils of both Røyken and Asker. It was determined that the municipalities would officially merge on 1 January 2020. During the 2019 Norwegian local elections, voters in the three municipalities voted on who they wanted to govern the new municipality rather than their three original municipalities, the newly elected councillors took their seats on the same day as the municipalities merged.

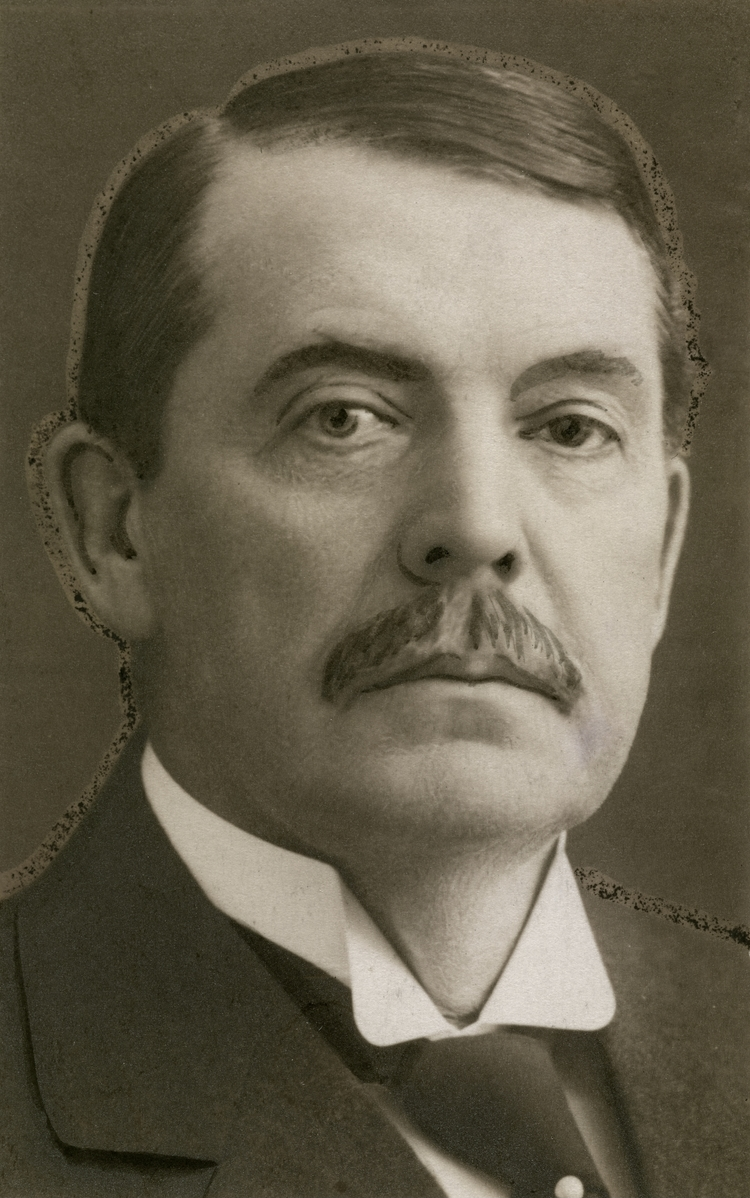
Fred. Olsen, ca.1900

== Notable people ==
- Tønne Huitfeldt (1625 in Hurum - 1677) military officer, and landowner.
- Gustav Peter Blom (1785 in Hurum – 1869) civil servant, historian and rep. at the Norwegian Constitutional Assembly at Eidsvoll in 1814
- Andreas Tofte (1795 in Hurum – 1852) businessman, first Mayor of Oslo in 1837
- Thomas Fredrik Olsen (1857 in Filtvet – 1933) ship company owner of Fred. Olsen & Co.
- Odd Børresen (1923 in Sætre – 2010) a linguist, preacher, and missionary in the DR Congo
- Reiulf Steen (1933 in Hurum – 2014) a Norwegian author, ambassador and politician
- Morten Harket (born 1959) the voice of the Norwegian band a-ha, lives in Sætre
