= Nesbygda =

Village in Drammen Municipality, Norway

Coordinates: 59°39′N 10°23′E

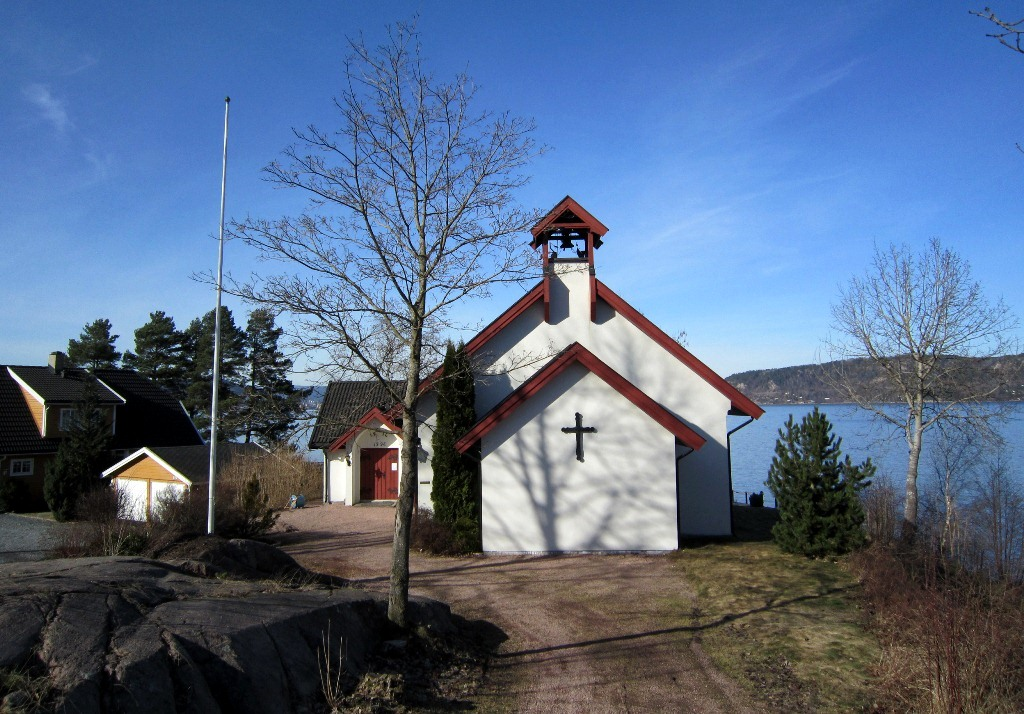
A church in Nesbygda

Nesbygda is a village in the municipality of Drammen, Norway, located north of Svelvik. Its population (SSB 2023) is 1,023.
