= Berger, Drammen =

Town in Drammen Municipality, Norway

Coordinates: 59.5525°N 10.3861°E

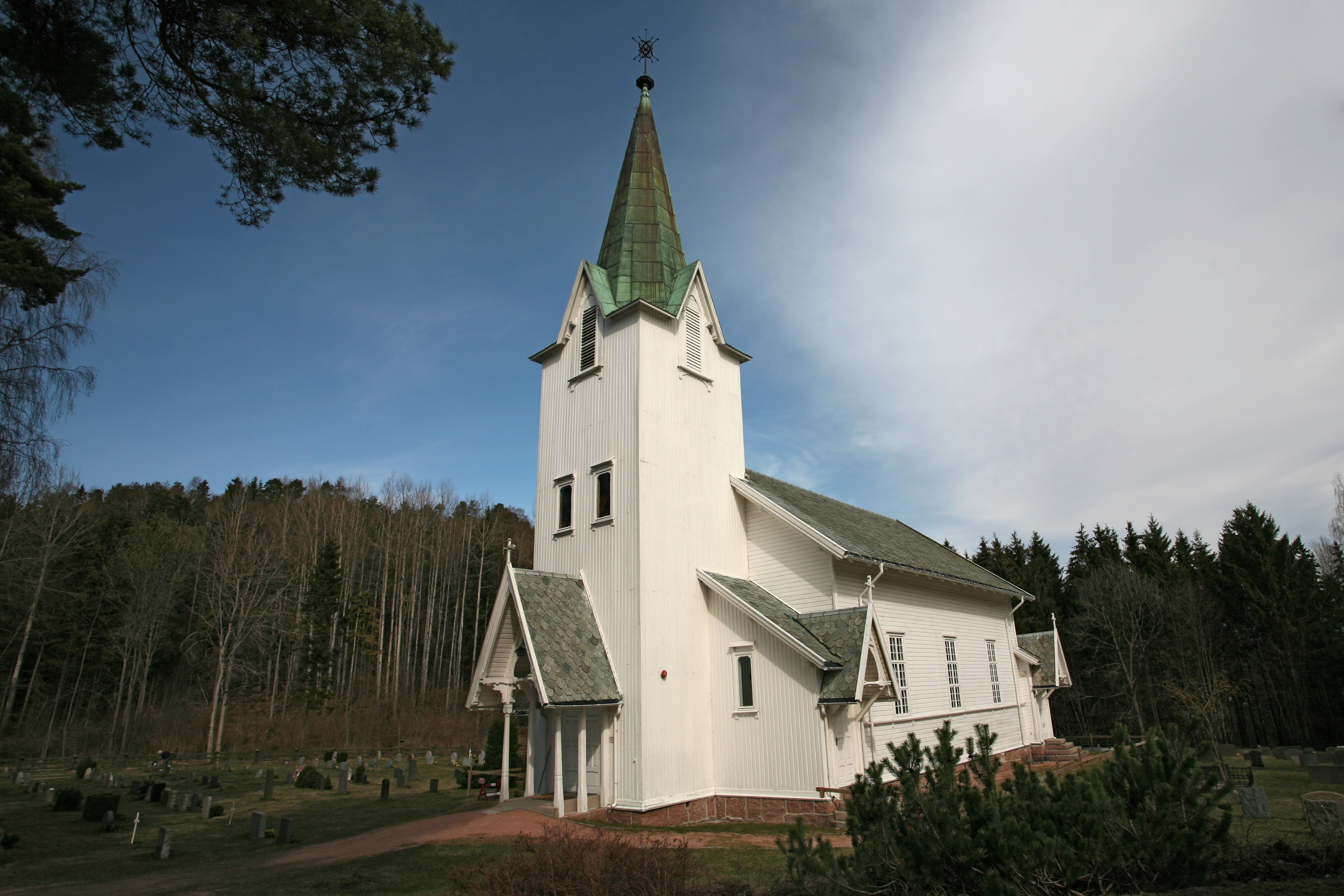
Berger Church in Svelvik

Berger is a town in the municipality of Drammen in Buskerud, Norway. The town has a population of 1,125 (2021), and lies on the western side of the Drammensfjord.

== History ==
The town of Berger grew into an industrial center around the Berger and Fossekleven factories. In 1880, Berger Factory was established by Jens J. Jebsen. Fossekleven Factory was established in 1889 by Jørg Jebsen, a younger brother of Jens J. Jebsen. Both were nephews of factory owner Peter Jebsen who operated a textile factory at Arna outside Bergen. Berger and Fossekleven factories were situated at the waterfall Fossekleiva and were in operation until 2002. The former factory buildings now house the Berger Museum and the Fossekleiva Cultural Center.

== Culture ==
=== Berger museum ===
Berger museum was reopened in 2015, and is associated with the Vestfold museums (Norwegian: Vestfoldmuseene). Based on Berger and Fossekleven factories, the museum shows the history of Norwegian textile history and has a number of displays relating to textile production.

=== Berger church ===
Berger church (Berger kirke) was built in 1895 and was designed by architect Schak Bull. Between 1948 and 1949, the church received a comprehensive internal restoration in collaboration with architect Arnstein Arneberg.
