= Viken (county) =

County of Norway (2020–2024)

Viken County Viken fylke
- Former County
- Coat of arms

- Location within Viken (county) Location within Norway
- Coordinates: 60°N 10°E
- Country: Norway
- County: Viken
- District: Eastern Norway
- Established: 1 January 2020
  - Preceded by: Buskerud, Akershus, and Østfold counties
- Disestablished: 1 January 2024
  - Succeeded by: Buskerud, Akershus, and Østfold counties
- Administrative centre: Oslo (county municipality) Drammen (council); Sarpsborg (offices) Moss (county governor)

Government
  - Body: Viken County Municipality
  - Governor (2011): Valgerd Svarstad Haugland (KrF)
  - County mayor (2020): Roger Ryberg (Ap)

Area (upon dissolution)
  - Total: 24,593 km^{2} (9,495 sq mi)
  - Land: 22,768 km^{2} (8,791 sq mi)
  - Water: 1,824 km^{2} (704 sq mi) 7.4%
  - Rank: #6 in Norway

Population (2021)
  - Total: 1,252,384
  - Rank: #1 in Norway
  - Density: 55/km^{2} (140/sq mi)
  - Change (10 years): ▲ +13.5%

Official language
  - Norwegian form: Neutral
- Time zone: UTC+01:00 (CET)
  - Summer (DST): UTC+02:00 (CEST)
- ISO 3166 code: NO-30
- Website: Official website

Viken was a short-lived county in Norway that existed from 1 January 2020 to 1 January 2024. Its name was derived from the historical region in present-day Norway and Sweden. The county was located in Eastern Norway when it was established on 1 January 2020 by the merger of Akershus, Buskerud and Østfold with the addition of the municipalities of Jevnaker, Lunner and the former Svelvik Municipality. Both its creation and its name—described as unhistorical by historians—were controversial from the onset, the merger was resisted by all the three counties and the new county had an approval rating of about 20% in the region. Viken has been compared to gerrymandering. The newly constructed coat of arms of Viken lacked a historical basis and was described by experts as an amateurish logo that did not adhere to the rules of heraldry, and as "three flying saucers under a cap." The county executive of Viken determined in 2019, before the merger had taken effect, that the county's disestablishment was its main political goal, and the formal process to dissolve Viken was initiated by the county executive right after the 2021 Norwegian parliamentary election in which parties seeking to reverse the merger won a majority. The political platform of the government of Jonas Gahr Støre stated that the government would dissolve Viken and re-establish Akershus, Buskerud and Østfold based on a request from the county itself. On 22 February 2022, the regional assembly of Viken approved the formal request to disestablish the county, and the disestablishment took effect on 1 January 2024.

Viken was home to over 1.2 million people, or 23% of the national population. The county seat was the national capital, Oslo, which was an enclave of Viken and is not part of the county. Oslo had been the seat of Akershus county since the Middle Ages. All of Viken was located in the historical Akershus, which included much of Eastern Norway. The county took its name from the historical region of Viken, which has been defined as an area in Bohuslän, in what is now western Sweden, since the late Middle Ages, but which was formerly used loosely for the region around the Oslofjord in the earlier middle ages.

== History ==
Viken was formed in 2020 by the merger of the counties Akershus, Buskerud, and Østfold. After the elected regional assemblies had voted against the proposed merger, a narrow majority of the right-wing parties in the Storting voted in 2017 to merge the counties in 2020 by force; in addition, the Storting voted to include Svelvik Municipality from Vestfold, and Jevnaker and Lunner municipalities from Oppland.

Viken county takes its name from the historic region of Viken, which during the Viking Age loosely referred to the areas around the Oslofjord but became synonymous with Bohuslän (now in Sweden) during the Middle Ages. In Norway, the use of the name Viken was revived only by the fascist Nasjonal Samling during the Second World War to draw parallels to the Viking Age. It referred to Vestfold and Buskerud as Vest-Viken and Akershus (including most of modern Oslo) and Østfold as Øst-Viken. The new Viken county does not include large parts of the historical Viken, including the region's historical centre Bohuslän, most of Vestfold or Oslo. Viken County decided that the interim county capital will be Oslo.

=== "Sannermandering" debate ===
Viken has been described, such as by the director of Oslo Museum Lars Roede, as an example of Sannermandering, named after the minister responsible, Jan Tore Sanner, and modelled after the term gerrymandering. Roede described Viken as "an extreme monstrosity that flies in the face of geography and history" that is "reminiscent of manipulated electoral districts in the United States" and deeply unpopular in the affected regions. Roede also criticised "the amateurish logos and unhistorical names".

=== Dissolution ===
Viken county was widely perceived as lacking legitimacy, with an approval rating of 20% in the region, and was opposed by the former counties concerned. A common complaint was the inclusion of inland mountain areas like Ål and Hemsedal, which lack a cultural connection to the Oslofjord area. Another common complaint was the non-inclusion of Oslo although it has been the capital of Akershus since the Middle Ages and is the county that has the closest ties to Akershus. Most of Akershus is part of the Oslo metropolitan area. On 1 October 2019, the newly-elected governing majority parties in the planned county declared their intention of seeking to dissolve Viken and to re-establish the counties of Akershus, Buskerud and Østfold. The official governing platform of Viken county stated, "Viken is an ill-considered construction. The Storting has merged Akershus, Buskerud and Østfold against their will". It declared that the disestablishment of Viken was the main political goal of the county administration. For the same reason, the county council decided that it would not do anything to merge the counties in practice or establish a common county administration. Instead, the existing counties continued to function at their current locations in anticipation of their formal re-establishment.

In the 2021 parliamentary election, the parties that sought to dissolve Viken won a majority, and the Centre Party made the disestablishment of Viken a condition for participating in a new government. Immediately after the election, the county executive initiated the formal process to dissolve Viken.

== Coat of arms ==
The county coat of arms was adopted in 2020 and based on a citizen's proposal. Therefore, it bears no resemblance to older heraldic arms from the area. The historian Lars Roede criticised the coat of arms as an "amateurish logo" and wrote that the coat of arms "does not adhere to the requirements of good heraldry" and so would have been rejected by heraldic experts in the National Archives. He stated that "looks like three flying saucers under [a] cap" and is "a logo, not a heraldic coat of arms".

== Municipalities ==
Viken County had a total of 51 municipalities, all created in 2020:

Municipality No.	Name	Population on 1 January 2020	Former Municipality No.	Former County
3001	Halden	31,373	0101 Halden	Østfold
3002	Moss	49,273	0104 Moss; 0136 Rygge	Østfold
3003	Sarpsborg	56,732	0105 Sarpsborg	Østfold
3004	Fredrikstad	82,385	0106 Fredrikstad	Østfold
3005	Drammen	101,386	0602 Drammen; 0625 Nedre Eiker	Buskerud
3005	Drammen	101,386	0711 Svelvik	Vestfold
3006	Kongsberg	27,723	0604 Kongsberg	Buskerud
3007	Ringerike	30,641	0605 Ringerike	Buskerud
3011	Hvaler	4,668	0111 Hvaler	Østfold
3012	Aremark	1,325	0118 Aremark	Østfold
3013	Marker	3,595	0119 Marker	Østfold
3014	Indre Østfold	44,792	0122 Trøgstad; 0123 Spydeberg; 0124 Askim; 0125 Eidsberg; 0138 Hobøl	Østfold
3015	Skiptvet	3,805	0127 Skiptvet	Østfold
3016	Rakkestad	8,255	0128 Rakkestad	Østfold
3017	Råde	7,508	0135 Råde	Østfold
3018	Våler	5,736	0137 Våler	Østfold
3019	Vestby	18,042	0211 Vestby	Akershus
3020	Nordre Follo	59,288	0213 Ski; 0217 Oppegård	Akershus
3021	Ås	20,439	0214 Ås	Akershus
3022	Frogn	15,877	0215 Frogn	Akershus
3023	Nesodden	19,616	0216 Nesodden	Akershus
3024	Bærum	127,731	0219 Bærum	Akershus
3025	Asker	94,441	0220 Asker	Akershus
3025	Asker	94,441	0627 Røyken; 0628 Hurum	Buskerud
3026	Aurskog-Høland	17,390	0121 Rømskog	Østfold
3026	Aurskog-Høland	17,390	0222 Aurskog-Høland	Akershus
3027	Rælingen	18,530	0228 Rælingen	Akershus
3028	Enebakk	11,110	0229 Enebakk	Akershus
3029	Lørenskog	41,460	0230 Lørenskog	Akershus
3030	Lillestrøm	85,983	0226 Sørum; 0227 Fet; 0231 Skedsmo	Akershus
3031	Nittedal	24,249	0233 Nittedal	Akershus
3032	Gjerdrum	6,890	0234 Gjerdrum	Akershus
3033	Ullensaker	39,625	0235 Ullensaker	Akershus
3034	Nes	23,092	0236 Nes	Akershus
3035	Eidsvoll	25,436	0237 Eidsvoll	Akershus
3036	Nannestad	14,139	0238 Nannestad	Akershus
3037	Hurdal	2,854	0239 Hurdal	Akershus
3038	Hole	6,799	0612 Hole	Buskerud
3039	Flå	1,050	0615 Flå	Buskerud
3040	Nesbyen	3,273	0616 Nes	Buskerud
3041	Gol	4,608	0617 Gol	Buskerud
3042	Hemsedal	2,486	0618 Hemsedal	Buskerud
3043	Ål	4,674	0619 Ål	Buskerud
3044	Hol	4,441	0620 Hol	Buskerud
3045	Sigdal	3,467	0621 Sigdal	Buskerud
3046	Krødsherad	2,212	0622 Krødsherad	Buskerud
3047	Modum	14,115	0623 Modum	Buskerud
3048	Øvre Eiker	19,423	0624 Øvre Eiker	Buskerud
3049	Lier	26,811	0626 Lier	Buskerud
3050	Flesberg	2,688	0631 Flesberg	Buskerud
3051	Rollag	1,390	0632 Rollag	Buskerud
3052	Nore og Uvdal	2,439	0633 Nore og Uvdal	Buskerud
3053	Jevnaker	6,852	0532 Jevnaker	Oppland
3054	Lunner	9,048	0533 Lunner	Oppland
