= Drammensfjorden =

Fjord in Eastern Norway

- Drammensfjord (unofficial)
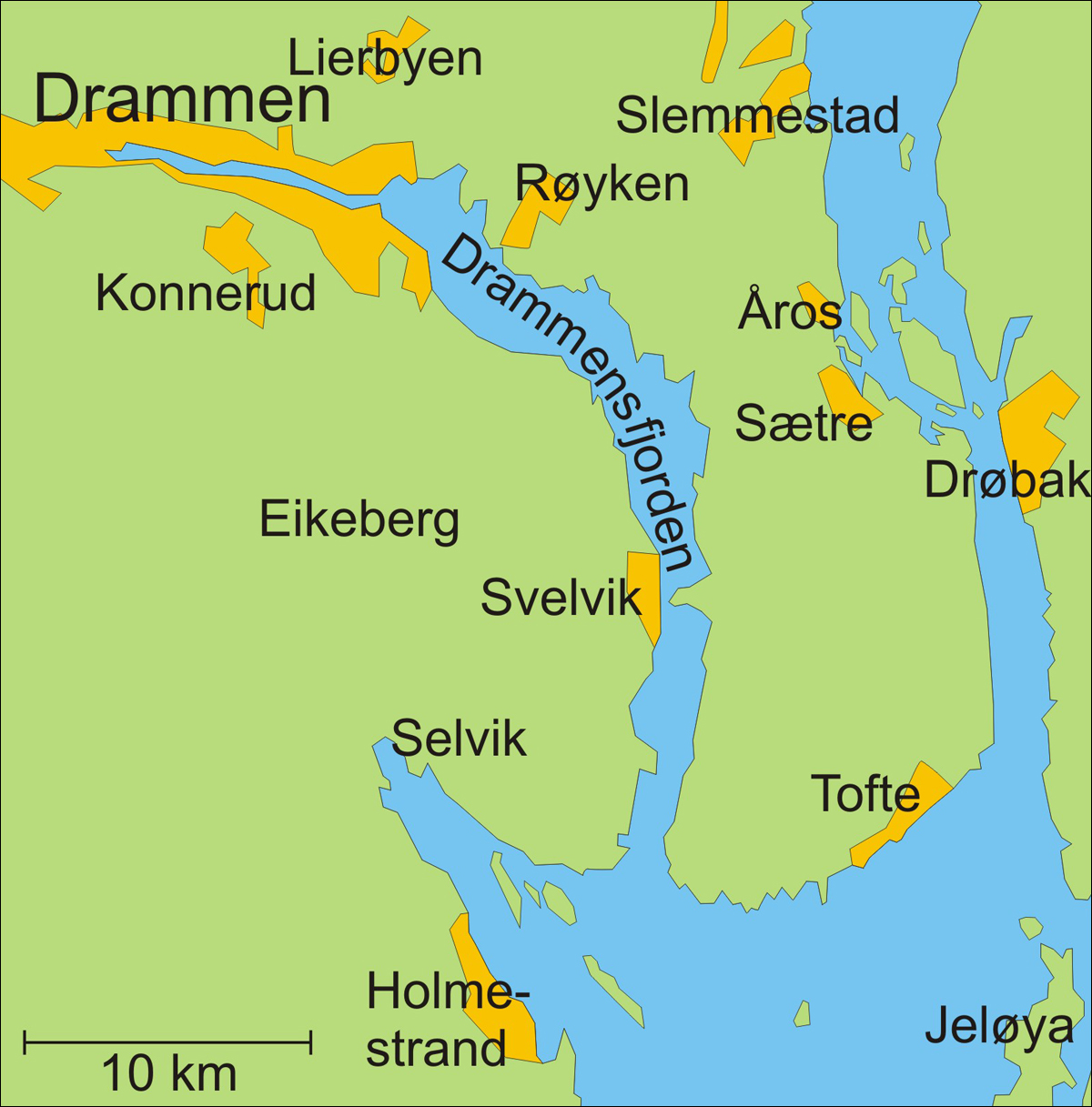
- View of the fjord
- Interactive map of the fjord
- Location: Akershus and Buskerud, Norway
- Coordinates: 59.70°N 10.34°E
- Type: Fjord
- Primary inflows: Drammenselva river
- Primary outflows: Ytre Oslofjord
- Basin countries: Norway
- Max. length: 30 kilometres (19 mi)
- Settlements: Drammen, Svelvik

Drammensfjorden (English: Drammen Fjord) is a fjord in along the border of Akershus and Buskerud counties in Norway that connects to the Ytre Oslofjord on the west side. It stretches about 30 kilometres (19 mi) to the north and northeast. The Drammenselva river discharges into the head of the fjord. The fjord shares its name with the city of Drammen, which is located at the head of the fjord. Drammen Municipality is located on its west and north sides. The land on the east side of the fjord is called Hurumhalvøya or the Hurum peninsula and this is located in Asker Municipality. The peninsula lies between the Drammensfjorden and the Oslofjord.

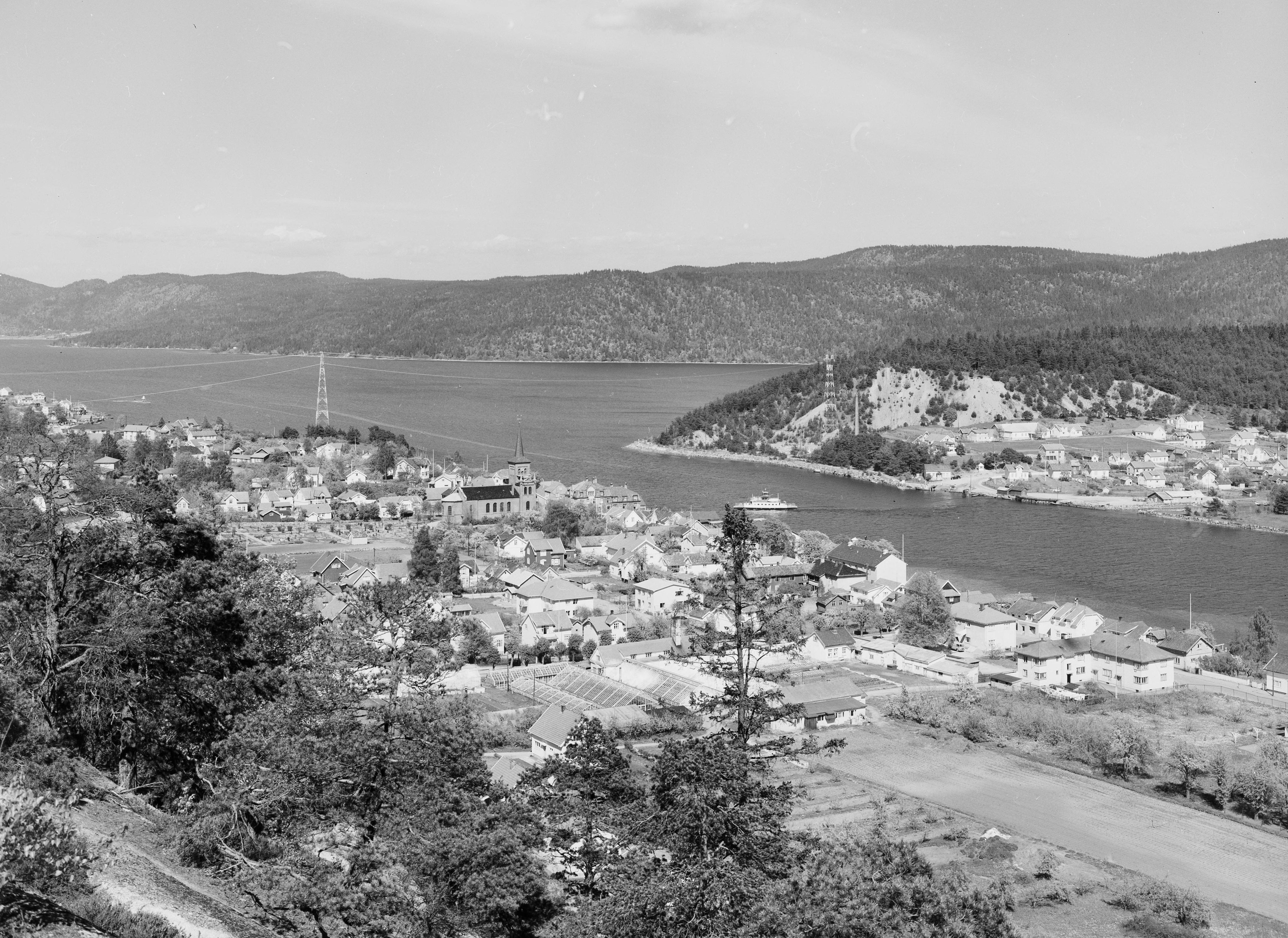
The narrow, shallow Svelvik strait has Norway's shortest ferry crossing.

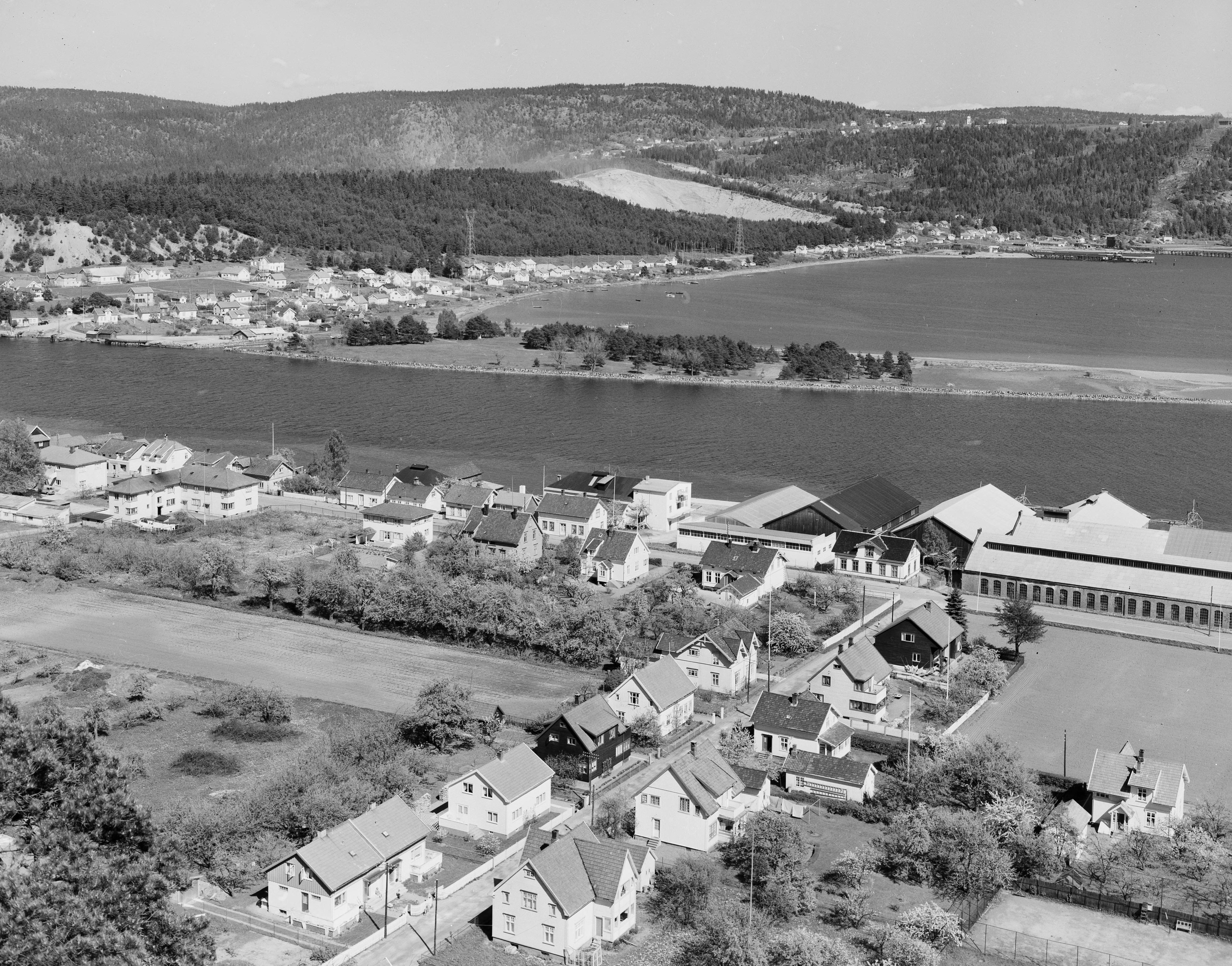
The Svelvik strait and the sandy Svelvik moraine.

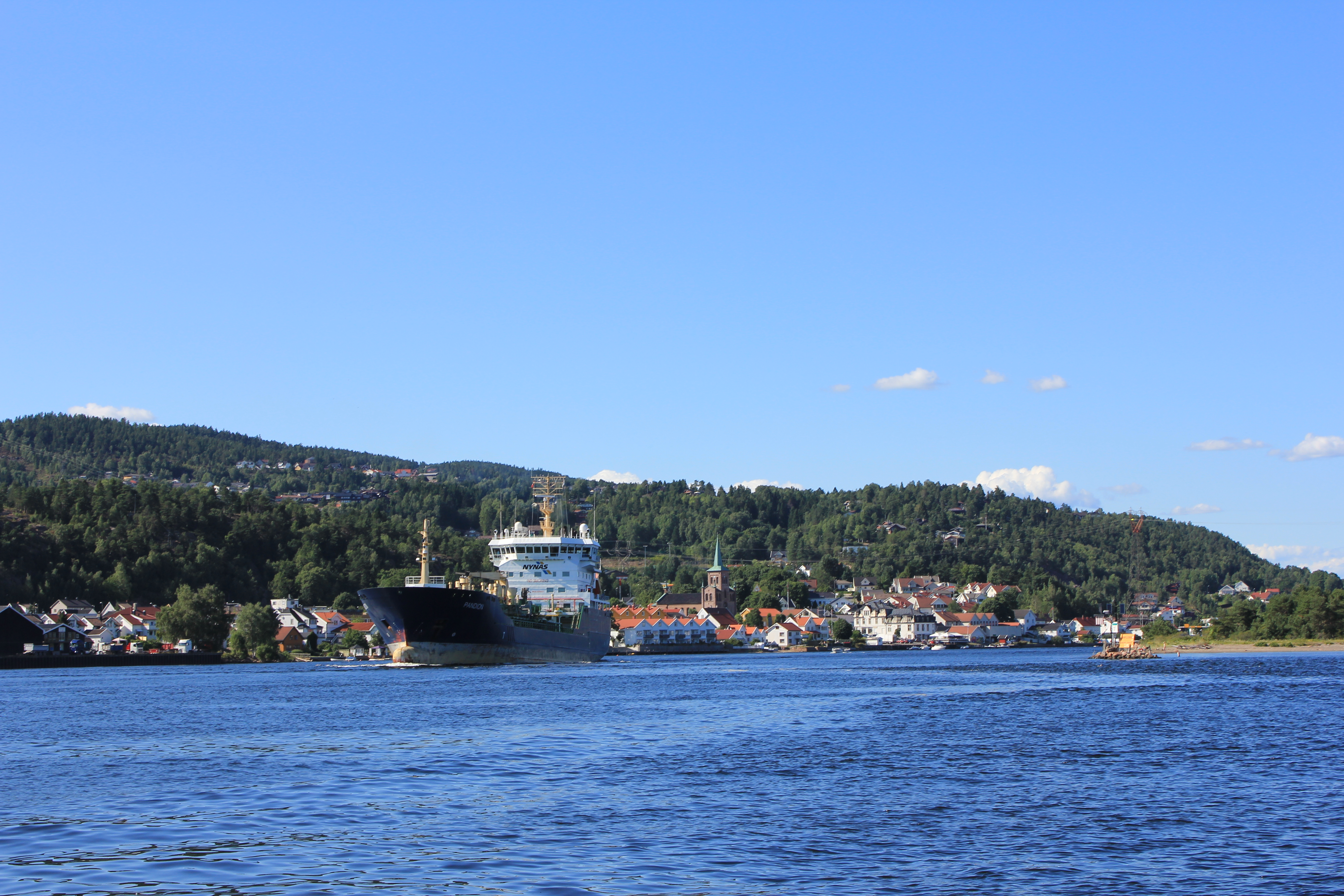
The 117 m (384 ft) «Pandion» passing through the strait (2010).

The fjord narrows to a strait at Svelvik (in Drammen Municipality) on the west side and Verket (in Asker Municipality) on the east side. The strait is crossed by an automobile ferry. This narrowing, some 200 metres (660 ft) broad and 10 metres (33 ft) deep, combined with the large freshwater inflow from the river Drammenselva (one of Norway's largest rivers) and from the river Lierelva, results in the water north of the strait being brackish. On the surface the water is fairly fresh, resulting in bathing areas that are free of jellyfish, while deeper the water has a higher salt concentration, with saltwater fish such as cod, pollock, flounder, and mackerel.

The ocean tide going through the strait is one of Norway's strongest currents. The outflow can reach speeds of 5 knots (9.3 km/h; 5.8 mph). The strait is known the Selvikstrømmen (the Svelvik current). Large ships can only sail in daylight and the largest only when assisted by tugboats. The strait has been made wider and deeper to accommodate traffic. Dead coral reefs are also found at depths of about 10–20 metres (33–66 ft) below sea level in the fjord. The maximum depth of the fjord northwards of the strait, reaching 117 metres (384 ft).

For a number of decades the Drammensfjord was heavily polluted. The sewage and industrial discharges by industries in the city of Drammen have been corrected so that the water is now much cleaner. Salmon and sea trout are again found in both the fjord and the Drammenselva river.

In historic times the Drammensfjord was known by the Old Norse name Dramn or Drofn, meaning hazy waters. In the Norse sagas. Snorre Sturlason tells that Saint Olav hid himself from Canute the Great at a fjord which was called Dramn. At that time the water stood about 4–5 metres (13–16 ft) higher and the fjord reached up to Hokksund. This area is still rebounding from the enormous weight of the glacial ice (isostatic rebound), "growing out of the sea" several millimetres a year, especially near the inner part of the long fjords, where the ice cover was thickest. This is a slow process, thus the sea covered substantial areas of what is today dry land for thousands of years following the end of the last ice age. During the Viking Age, the Drammensfjorden north of the Svelvik Strait was regarded as a lake and the Svelvik Strait was regarded as the mouth of the Drammenselva river.

== See also ==
- List of Norwegian fjords
