= List of villages in Buskerud =

This is a list of villages in Buskerud, a county of Norway. Villages which are the administrative centers of their municipality are highlighted in blue and marked with this symbol (†) on this list. The term "villages" refers includes settlements, hamlets, and farm areas in Buskerud county. The list excludes cities/towns located in Buskerud. For other counties see the lists of villages in Norway.

Place	Coordinates	Postal code	Municipality
Ask	60°08′07″N 10°10′05″E	3519	Ringerike
Askgrenda	59°48′44″N 10°12′09″E	3400	Lier
Bergangrende	59°59′11″N 9°20′20″E	3626	Rollag
Berger	59°32′32″N 10°22′41″E	3075	Drammen
Bergheim	60°28′32″N 9°14′57″E	3540	Nesbyen
Bevergrenda	59°42′13″N 9°37′46″E	3614	Kongsberg
Bingen	59°53′00″N 9°46′00″E	3330	Øvre Eiker
Borgegrende	60°16′09″N 9°00′17″E	3630	Nore og Uvdal
Brekebygda	60°33′09″N 9°56′42″E	3524	Ringerike
Brekkebygda	60°17′59″N 9°45′34″E	3534	Ringerike
Burud	59°48′41″N 9°52′55″E	3300	Øvre Eiker
Dagali	60°24′41″N 8°26′27″E	3580	Hol
Darbu	59°41′53″N 9°47′57″E	3322	Øvre Eiker
Dramdal	59°50′05″N 9°54′48″E	3330	Øvre Eiker
Drolsum	60°00′45″N 10°01′30″E	3370	Modum
Efteløt	59°33′02″N 9°48′35″E	3618	Kongsberg
Egge	59°49′03″N 10°13′06″E	3400	Lier
Eggedal	60°14′45″N 9°21′25″E	3359	Sigdal
Eidal	60°04′47″N 9°31′28″E	3350	Sigdal
Eidal	60°33′53″N 9°02′03″E	3540	Nesbyen
Eikre	60°48′17″N 8°44′37″E	3560	Hemsedal
Espeset	60°34′00″N 9°01′00″E	3540	Nesbyen
Fagerliåsen/Poverudbyen	59°54′15″N 10°15′44″E	3410	Lier
Flesberg	59°51′47″N 9°25′57″E	3620	Flesberg
Flå (†)	60°25′49″N 9°27′43″E	3539	Flå
Garnås	60°38′28″N 9°01′39″E	3540	Nesbyen
Geilo	60°32′01″N 8°12′32″E	3580	Hol
Geithus	59°55′56″N 9°58′04″E	3360	Modum
Gomnes	60°04′42″N 10°10′28″E	3530	Hole
Gol (†)	60°42′05″N 8°56′44″E	3560	Gol
Golreppen	60°42′09″N 8°54′44″E	3550	Gol
Gravningsgrend	59°43′01″N 9°34′38″E	3614	Kongsberg
Grønlia/Tangen	59°41′12″N 10°20′58″E	3060	Drammen
Gulsvik	60°22′58″N 9°36′33″E	3539	Flå
Hagafoss	60°35′49″N 8°20′43″E	3576	Hol
Hallandsgrende	60°15′18″N 8°58′43″E	3630	Nore og Uvdal
Hallingby	60°16′12″N 10°11′15″E	3525	Ringerike
Haugastøl	60°30′43″N 7°51′47″E	3595	Hol
Haugsbygd	60°09′42″N 10°19′17″E	3514	Ringerike
Havikskogen	60°14′57″N 9°46′45″E	3534	Ringerike
Heggen	59°56′32″N 9°59′29″E	3370	Modum
Heistadmoen	59°35′47″N 9°39′49″E	3608	Kongsberg
Helgelandsmoen	60°07′04″N 10°14′00″E	3512	Hole
Hen	60°12′59″N 10°13′52″E	3516	Ringerike
Hennummarka	59°49′29″N 10°17′08″E	3409	Lier
Heradsbygda	60°10′51″N 10°12′08″E	3518	Ringerike
Hillestad	59°35′00″N 9°40′00″E	3612	Kongsberg
Hol (†)	60°36′54″N 8°17′38″E	3576	Hol
Holet	60°22′02″N 8°07′51″E	3576	Hol
Hostvet	59°36′N 9°45′E	3618	Kongsberg
Hovet	60°37′20″N 8°09′11″E	3577	Hol
Hovjordet	59°46′11″N 9°59′52″E	3055	Drammen
Hulbak	60°52′59″N 8°29′58″E	3560	Hemsedal
Hval	60°11′00″N 10°19′00″E	3514	Ringerike
Hvalsmoen	60°11′32″N 10°17′37″E	3514	Ringerike
Hvittingfoss	59°29′09″N 10°00′42″E	3647	Kongsberg
Jondalen	59°42′11″N 9°31′25″E	3614	Kongsberg
Juvsgrende	60°09′03″N 8°57′02″E	3629	Nore og Uvdal
Kjelleråsen	59°33′28″N 10°23′39″E	3075	Drammen
Kjenner	59°48′35″N 10°18′40″E	3420	Lier
Kleive	60°36′18″N 8°28′19″E	3570	Ål
Kløftefoss	60°05′16″N 9°50′06″E	3370	Modum
Komnes	59°30′00″N 9°55′00″E	3647	Kongsberg
Konnerud	59°43′18″N 10°08′40″E	3031	Drammen
Krekling	59°39′57″N 9°46′06″E	3322	Øvre Eiker
Krokstadelva	59°45′29″N 10°00′21″E	3055	Drammen
Kroksund	60°03′59″N 10°17′50″E	3531	Hole
Krokåsen	59°33′58″N 10°24′16″E	3060	Drammen
Krøderen	60°07′26″N 9°47′10″E	3535	Krødsherad
Kvinnegardslie	60°38′48″N 8°27′35″E	3570	Ål
Kvisla	60°34′55″N 8°18′40″E	3580	Hol
Lahell	59°43′26″N 10°18′43″E	3400	Lier
Lampeland (†)	59°50′05″N 9°34′45″E	3623	Flesberg
Leveld	60°42′04″N 8°29′13″E	3570	Ål
Liagardane	60°39′33″N 8°38′16″E	3570	Ål
Lierbyen (†)	59°47′11″N 10°14′40″E	3400	Lier
Lierskogen	59°49′11″N 10°19′51″E	3420	Lier
Lierstranda	59°45′20″N 10°15′41″E	3412	Lier
Ligrenda	59°53′13″N 9°29′34″E	3624	Flesberg
Lio	60°52′11″N 8°23′53″E	3560	Hemsedal
Losmoen	59°45′50″N 9°55′38″E	3300	Øvre Eiker
Lykkja	60°53′00″N 8°49′47″E	3560	Hemsedal
Lyngdal	59°54′41″N 9°31′42″E	3624	Flesberg
Mjøndalen	59°44′53″N 10°01′01″E	3050	Drammen
Modum Bad	59°58′03″N 9°56′29″E	3370	Modum
Myrefjell	59°59′01″N 9°05′45″E	3628	Rollag
Nakkerud	60°03′06″N 10°02′56″E	3533	Ringerike
Nedre Eggedal	60°08′27″N 9°26′08″E	3358	Sigdal
Nes	60°00′00″N 10°16′00″E	3531	Hole
Nes i Ådal	60°33′49″N 9°59′16″E	3524	Ringerike
Nesbyen (†)	60°34′05″N 9°06′10″E	3540	Nesbyen
Nesbygda	59°39′27″N 10°22′33″E	3060	Drammen
Nordbygda	60°16′30″N 9°15′45″E	3359	Sigdal
Norderhov	60°07′51″N 10°16′06″E	3512	Ringerike
Nore	60°10′08″N 9°00′41″E	3629	Nore og Uvdal
Noresund (†)	60°10′47″N 9°37′27″E	3536	Krødsherad
Nymoen	60°12′27″N 10°15′18″E	3516	Ringerike
Oddevall	59°51′44″N 10°13′04″E	3400	Lier
Oppheim	60°40′20″N 8°40′53″E	3597	Ål
Oppsal	59°50′52″N 10°16′01″E	3408	Lier
Ormåsen	59°45′23″N 9°49′54″E	3320	Øvre Eiker
Ovenstadlia	59°49′20″N 10°19′15″E	3420	Lier
Passebekk	59°30′41″N 9°49′35″E	3648	Kongsberg
Prestfoss (†)	60°02′41″N 9°38′07″E	3350	Sigdal
Reistad	59°46′35″N 10°17′25″E	3425	Lier
Ringmoen	60°21′19″N 10°05′45″E	3525	Ringerike
Rollag (†)	59°59′03″N 9°17′47″E	3626	Rollag
Rue	60°37′36″N 8°11′09″E	3577	Hol
Rundskogen	60°10′07″N 9°33′40″E	3536	Krødsherad
Rødberg (†)	60°16′02″N 8°56′50″E	3630	Nore og Uvdal
Røkeberg	59°44′14″N 9°53′50″E	3320	Øvre Eiker
Røyse	60°04′37″N 10°11′47″E	3530	Hole
Rågrende	60°16′22″N 8°57′39″E	3630	Nore og Uvdal
Saggrenda	59°37′58″N 9°36′09″E	3614	Kongsberg
Simostranda	59°55′53″N 9°49′55″E	3340	Modum
Sjåstad	59°51′11″N 10°12′46″E	3400	Lier
Skinnes	59°29′18″N 9°57′57″E	3648	Kongsberg
Skogan	60°08′48″N 9°03′54″E	3629	Nore og Uvdal
Skoger	59°41′13″N 10°13′23″E	3039	Drammen
Skollenborg	59°37′20″N 9°41′44″E	3619	Kongsberg
Skotselv	59°50′41″N 9°53′05″E	3330	Øvre Eiker
Snarum	60°02′00″N 9°53′00″E	3370	Modum
Sokna	60°14′22″N 9°55′37″E	3534	Ringerike
Solbergelva	59°45′48″N 10°04′43″E	3057	Drammen
Sollihøgda	59°57′50″N 10°20′45″E	3538	Hole
Solumsmoen	59°57′49″N 9°46′15″E	3355	Sigdal
Steinberg	59°45′36″N 9°57′18″E	3053	Drammen
Steinsrud	59°51′54″N 9°50′02″E	3330	Øvre Eiker
Steinsåsen	60°05′20″N 10°17′17″E	3530	Hole
Strømsoddbygda	60°20′48″N 9°51′18″E	3534	Ringerike
Stuvestadgrenda	59°54′44″N 9°24′50″E	3620	Flesberg
Sundvollen	60°03′46″N 10°18′26″E	3531	Hole
Sunnegrenda	59°37′25″N 9°39′10″E	3619	Kongsberg
Svene	59°47′34″N 9°34′44″E	3622	Flesberg
Svenkerud	60°38′54″N 9°03′00″E	3540	Nesbyen
Svøo	60°50′18″N 8°37′30″E	3560	Hemsedal
Sylling	59°53′35″N 10°17′28″E	3410	Lier
Sysle	59°59′24″N 9°55′07″E	3370	Modum
Sønsteby	59°55′20″N 9°58′56″E	3370	Modum
Sørbygde	60°22′06″N 9°38′50″E	3539	Flå
Sørhovet	60°37′25″N 8°13′38″E	3577	Hol
Sørumlia/Linneslia	59°45′42″N 10°17′32″E	3400	Lier
Såsen	59°43′10″N 9°52′32″E	3320	Øvre Eiker
Torpo	60°39′52″N 8°43′10″E	3579	Ål
Tranby	59°48′38″N 10°15′39″E	3408	Lier
Tronstad	59°52′56″N 10°14′36″E	3410	Lier
Trøym (†)	60°51′46″N 8°33′19″E	3560	Hemsedal
Tunhovd	60°27′42″N 8°45′53″E	3540	Nore og Uvdal
Tuv	60°52′46″N 8°29′07″E	3560	Hemsedal
Tyristrand	60°05′08″N 10°05′50″E	3533	Ringerike
Ullsåk	60°51′00″N 8°36′58″E	3560	Hemsedal
Ustaoset	60°29′54″N 8°02′34″E	3593	Hol
Uvdal	60°16′00″N 8°44′00″E	3632	Nore og Uvdal
Varlo	59°47′00″N 9°52′00″E	3300	Øvre Eiker
Vatnås	59°57′39″N 9°37′37″E	3355	Sigdal
Vats	60°41′22″N 8°21′40″E	3570	Ål
Veggli	60°02′32″N 9°09′17″E	3628	Rollag
Veme	60°12′23″N 10°05′11″E	3534	Ringerike
Vestbygda	60°14′19″N 9°51′25″E	3534	Ringerike
Vestbygda	60°14′24″N 9°15′29″E	3359	Sigdal
Vestfossen	59°43′57″N 9°52′05″E	3320	Øvre Eiker
Vestre Spone	59°57′09″N 9°54′18″E	3370	Modum
Vik (†)	60°04′37″N 10°16′45″E	3530	Hole
Viker	60°27′00″N 10°02′25″E	3516	Ringerike
Vikersund (†)	59°58′06″N 9°59′28″E	3370	Modum
Vikugrende	60°17′07″N 8°52′47″E	3630	Nore og Uvdal
Viul	60°12′06″N 10°20′40″E	3514	Ringerike
Østskaugen	59°56′49″N 9°33′12″E	3624	Flesberg
Øygardan	60°43′31″N 8°53′12″E	3550	Gol
Øygardsgrend	60°18′39″N 8°58′03″E	3630	Nore og Uvdal
Ål (†)	60°37′49″N 8°33′39″E	3570	Ål
Åmot	59°53′31″N 9°55′32″E	3340	Modum
Åsa	60°07′30″N 10°21′36″E	3512	Ringerike
Åsbygda	60°11′48″N 10°22′01″E	3520	Ringerike
Åsbøgrendi	60°12′23″N 9°00′03″E	3629	Nore og Uvdal
Åsgardan	60°43′04″N 8°56′45″E	3550	Gol
