= Lier Line =

Railway line in Norway

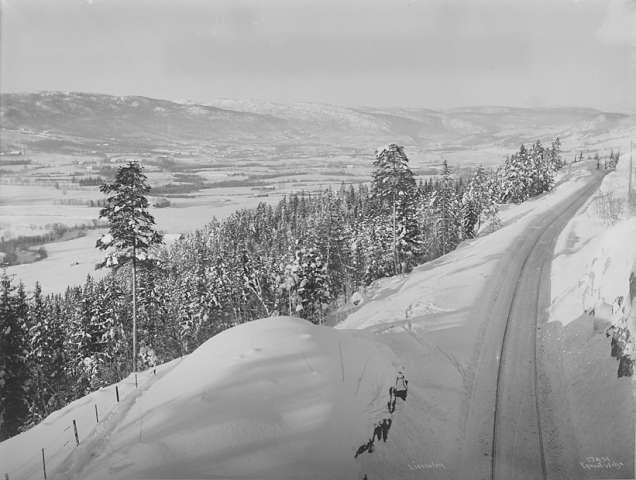
- 29 December 1915

Overview
- Native name: Lierbanen
- Status: Abandoned
- Owner: A/S Lierbanen
- Termini: Lier; Svangstrand
- Stations: 8

Service
- Type: Railway
- System: Norwegian railway
- Operator(s): A/S Lierbanen

History
- Opened: 12 July 1904
- Closed: 1 January 1937

Technical
- Line length: 21.15 km (13.14 mi)
- Number of tracks: Single
- Character: Passenger and freight
- Track gauge: 1,067 mm (3 ft 6 in)

The Lier Line (Norwegian: Lierbanen) or LB is an abandoned railway line that ran through Lier in Norway. The private, narrow gauge railway branched from the Drammen Line at the old Lier Station, and ran 21.15 kilometers (13.14 mi) to Svangstrand on the lake Tyrifjorden, where it connected with a steam ship operated by the railway company. Among the villages the line served were Egge, Sjåstad and Sylling, in addition to two branch lines, from Iledalen to Tronstad Bruk, and from Egge to Egge Gravel Pit.

Discussions regarding the building of a line through Lier started in 1895, and construction commenced in 1901. The line opened on 12 July 1904 and was initially profitable, in part because of tourist traffic. In 1920, the Drammen Line was converted to standard gauge, resulting in expensive transshipment between the two lines. This and falling traffic caused the line to become unprofitable. The Lier line was closed for ordinary traffic on 23 October 1932. All traffic ceased on 1 January 1937 and the track was demolished shortly afterwards.

== Route ==
The line was built with 1,067 mm (3 ft 6 in) narrow gauge, a minimum curve radius of 100 metres (330 ft) and a steepest gradient of 3.0 percent. It was the only line in Norway for which no blasting was done during construction. At the old Lier Station, located 24.5 meters (80 ft) above mean sea level (AMSL), the line connected with the Drammen Line and then ran 21.15 kilometers (13.14 mi) northwards up the Lier Valley. The line passed through stations at Landfald and Egge before reaching a branch line to the gravel pit at Egge. The line continued past Utengen and Sjåstad before crossing the wooden, 49-meter-long (161 ft) Sjåstad Bridge. It then ran past Muggerud and ran along the 46-meter-long (151 ft) viaduct across Sverregropen until passing Iledalen. A 0.80-kilometer (0.50 mi) branch line ran from Iledalen via a wooden 30-meter-long (98 ft) bridge over Solbergelva to Tronstad Bruk. The main line continued across the wooden, 90-meter-long (300 ft) bridge over the creek Solbergelva before reaching Sylling. This was the line's highest elevation, at 128.8 meters (423 ft) AMSL. Between there and Holsfjorden, a branch of the Tyrifjorden lake, the line was built with a zig-zag, so the train had to back 1 kilometer (0.6 mi) and then continue forward. At Svangstrand, located 65.0 meters (213.3 ft) AMSL there was connection with a steam ship.

The only track left after the demolishing was a short section at Lier Station, which remained until the station closed in 1973. The old Lier Station has been preserved. The section between Reenskaug, located a few hundred meters (yards) from Lier Station, to Landfald has become the suburban street Lijevegen. From Landfall to Egge, the right-of-way is an overgrown path. From Egge to Muggerud, the right-of-way is used as the street Banevegen. In 1993, the right-of-way from Muggerud to Rønningen was rebuilt as a hiking and riding path. The branch towards Tronstad Bruk has been converted to a street, although most of the right-of-way north of Rønning has disappeared, as it has been reclaimed as agricultural land, particularly north of Sylling. The station area at Svangstand in intact, with the station building looking just like it did in 1904. Other station buildings have been converted to homes or commercial buildings.

== History ==
The first political consideration of a proposal to build a line through the Lier Valley occurred on 2 March 1895, when the municipal council discarded the idea, stating that it was of no interest for the community. However, there were many locals who had observed the economic impact the Drammen Line had on the southern part of the municipality, and called for a line also to the northern parts. In 1896, a committee was established, led by captain and entrepreneur H. J. Hofgaard. Engineering reports estimated the costs to NOK 700,000, including NOK 37,000 for a steamship on Tyrifjorden. Estimates called for 23,900 passengers and 17,000 tonnes (17,000 long tons; 19,000 short tons) of cargo each year, which was sufficient to break even.

They argued that the valley's two roads were insufficient for the valley's transport needs. At the same time, they pointed out that there was no industry in Lier that would need a railway, and that by building a line, such industry would be established. In April 1897, the committee held a public offering of shares in A/S Lierbanen. At the same time, they sent an application for a social grant to the Ministry of Labour for NOK 330,000, plus NOK 30,375 from the Norwegian State Railways (NSB).

The committee proposed that the municipality buy shares for NOK 150,000. When the issue was debated in the municipal council on 9 June, it met with resistance from representatives from Tranby in the west of Lier, who stated that they felt that the railway would have no impact on them, and that the municipality should only buy shares for NOK 75,000. It resulted in a compromise where the municipality bought shares for NOK 100,000. A year later, the municipality purchased shares for an addition NOK 30,000. The other major shareholders were Drammen Municipality with NOK 30,000, Buskerud County Municipality with NOK 50,000 and private investors, who supplied NOK 174,050.

During the debate in the Parliament of Norway in 1899, it was proposed that construction be delayed until the Drammen Line was upgraded to standard gauge, but this was rejected by the majority. The plans to build the line were passed on 18 May 1899 and parliament gave a grant of NOK 350,800. In 1903, this was supplemented with NOK 22,500. Construction started in late 1901 and was led by Engineer E. Richter. No blasting was done, but difficulties arose because of the large amounts of clay, which contributed to increase costs to NOK 800,000.

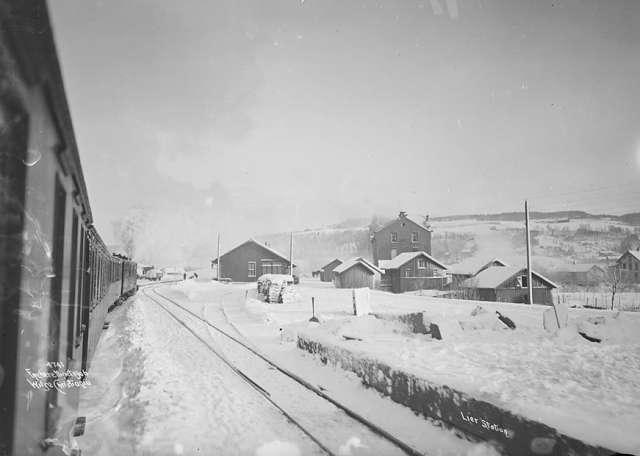
Lier Station as seen from a Drammen Line train in 1906

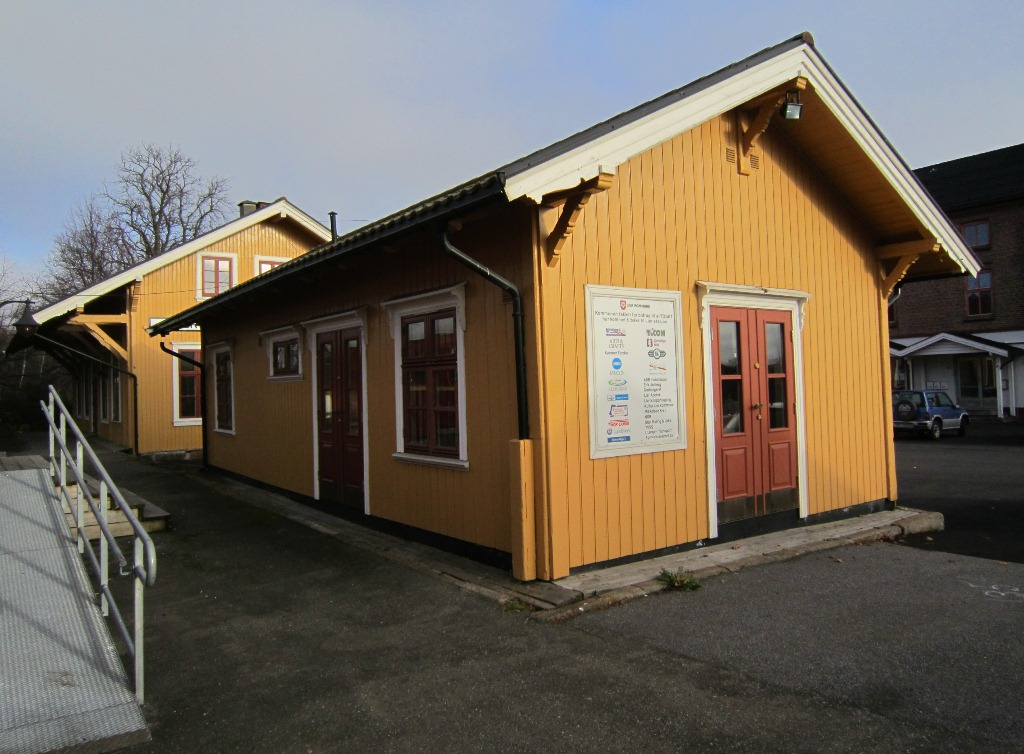
Old Lier Station in 2011

The line opened on 12 July 1904 and at the opening there were delivered two six-axle steam locomotives from Hartmann, which were named Lier and Hole. The railway also took delivery of two passenger cars, a combined freight and conductor car, and a number of freight cars. Periodically the railway needed extra haulage power, and therefore sometimes leased locomotives from the Norwegian State Railways. The initial fares were NOK 1.30 from Lier to Svangstrand, while the ferry across the lake cost an additional NOK 1.50. The greatest ridership was during the summer, when tourists took the line to reach the steam ships. During winter, the ridership fell, and the railway terminated at Sylling instead of Svangerstrand.

The company bought the steamship Activ, which supplemented the incumbent ferry Ringerike on Tyrifjorden. She had a capacity of 50 passengers and a crew of two, and a power output of 6 kilowatts (8 hp). She had been built in 1892 or 1894, and sold to A/S Lierbanen in 1904 or 1906. Activ was then put into service on the route from Sundvollan and Svangstrand. She was in bad shape, and was taken out of service in 1909, sold in 1911 and dismantled in 1914, after an accident.

The first year of operation had 40,000 passengers and gave a small profit, but the next two gave deficits of NOK 5,000. Fiscal year 1907–08 gave a profit of NOK 11,000, increasing to NOK 18,562 in 1912–13—by then the line had 64,080 passengers. The line had a large impact on Sylling, where the population increased from 467 in 1900 to 713 in 1910.

In 1920, the Drammen Line was rebuilt to standard gauge, and all cargo between the two lines had to be transshipped, increasing costs. The cheap construction methods, combined with bad geological conditions, caused derailing and other limitations to operation, including frequent delays. From 1922, the section from Lier to Egge was rebuilt to dual gauge to allow gravel trains to operate to the gravel pit at Egge. In 1927, a bus services started through the western part of Lier, claiming many of the trains' patrons. To help save the company, the employees offered to work for half wage, but it was not sufficient to save the line. All scheduled traffic was terminated on 23 October 1932, although the section to Tronstad Bruk was retained for some industrial trains until 31 December 1936. The line was then demolished.

== See also ==
- Narrow gauge railways in Norway
