= Veme Church =

Church in Buskerud, Norway

- Veme kirke
- View of the church
- Veme Church
- 60°12′24″N 10°05′09″E
- Location: Ringerike, Buskerud
- Country: Norway
- Denomination: Church of Norway
- Churchmanship: Evangelical Lutheran

History
- Status: Parish church
- Founded: 1893
- Consecrated: 6 Dec 1893

Architecture
- Functional status: Active
- Architect: Ingvar O. Hjorth
- Architectural type: Long church
- Completed: 1893 (133 years ago)

Specifications
- Capacity: 143
- Materials: Wood

Administration
- Diocese: Tunsberg
- Deanery: Ringerike prosti
- Parish: Veme
- Norwegian Cultural Heritage Site
- Type: Church
- Status: Not protected
- ID: 85801

Veme Church (Norwegian: Veme kirke) is a parish church of the Church of Norway in Ringerike Municipality in Buskerud county, Norway. It is located in the village of Veme. It is the church for the Veme parish which is part of the Ringerike prosti (deanery) in the Diocese of Tunsberg. The red brick church was built in a long church design in 1893 using plans drawn up by the architect Ingvar O. Hjorth. The church seats about 143 people.

== History ==
Veme Church is located between Hønefoss and Sokna. It is a long church constructed out of red brick with white painted plaster as a contrasting color. The church has a west tower (surrounded by a stairwell), rectangular nave, and a rectangular choir surrounded by sacristies. The church was consecrated on 6 December 1893. The architect was Ingvar Hjorth, while Anton Olsen from Tønsberg was the lead builder. In 1937 the interior was repainted according to a proposal by Domenico Erdmann. For the 75th anniversary in 1968, the church was extensively restored according to plans by Bjarne Hvoslef and with Odd Helland from the Riksantikvaren as color consultant. One of the changes was that the pulpit was moved from the choir to the north wall of the nave.

== Media gallery ==

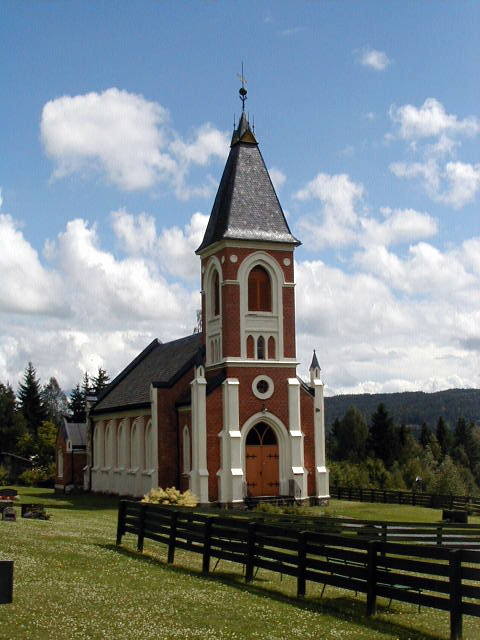

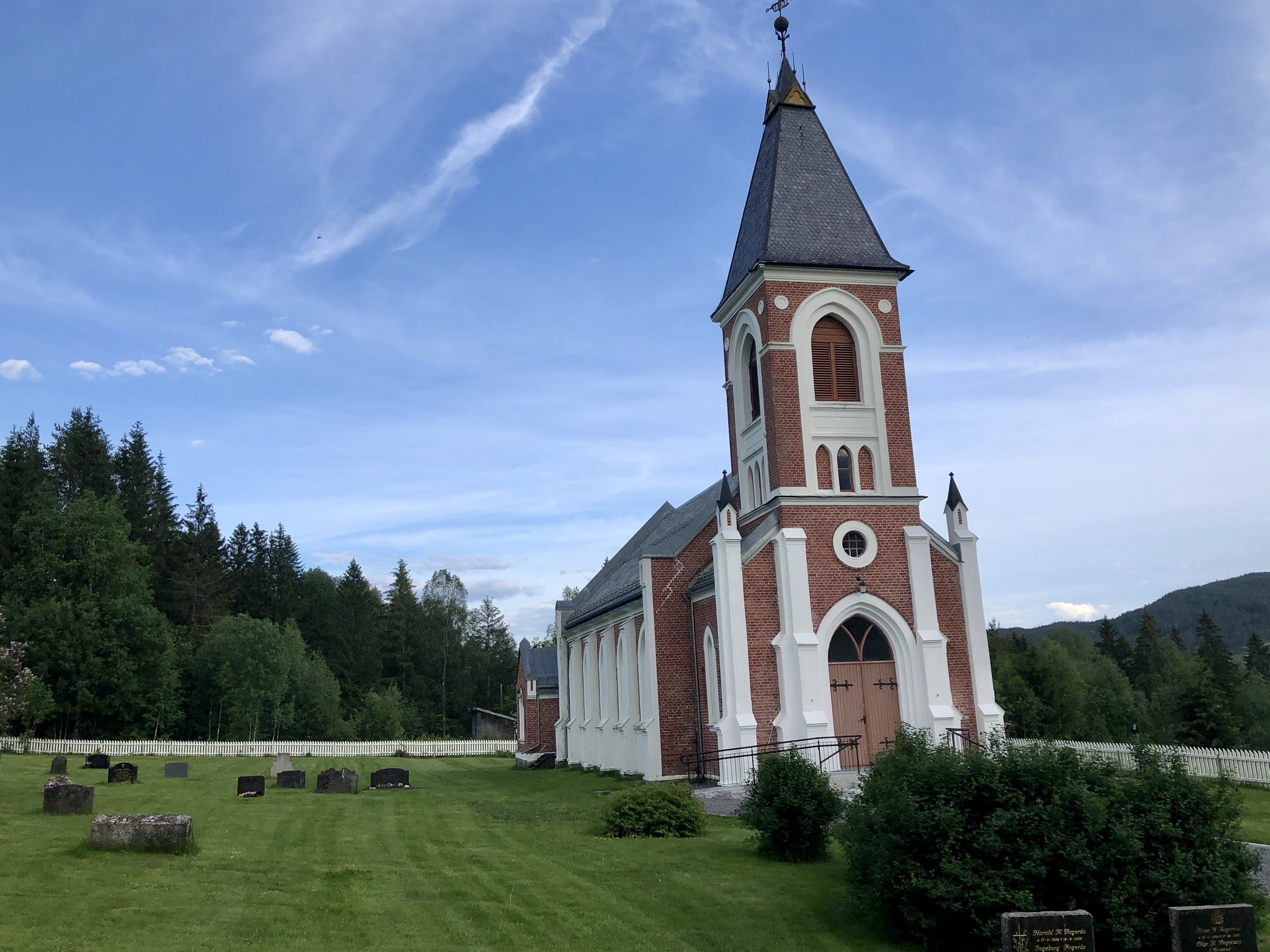

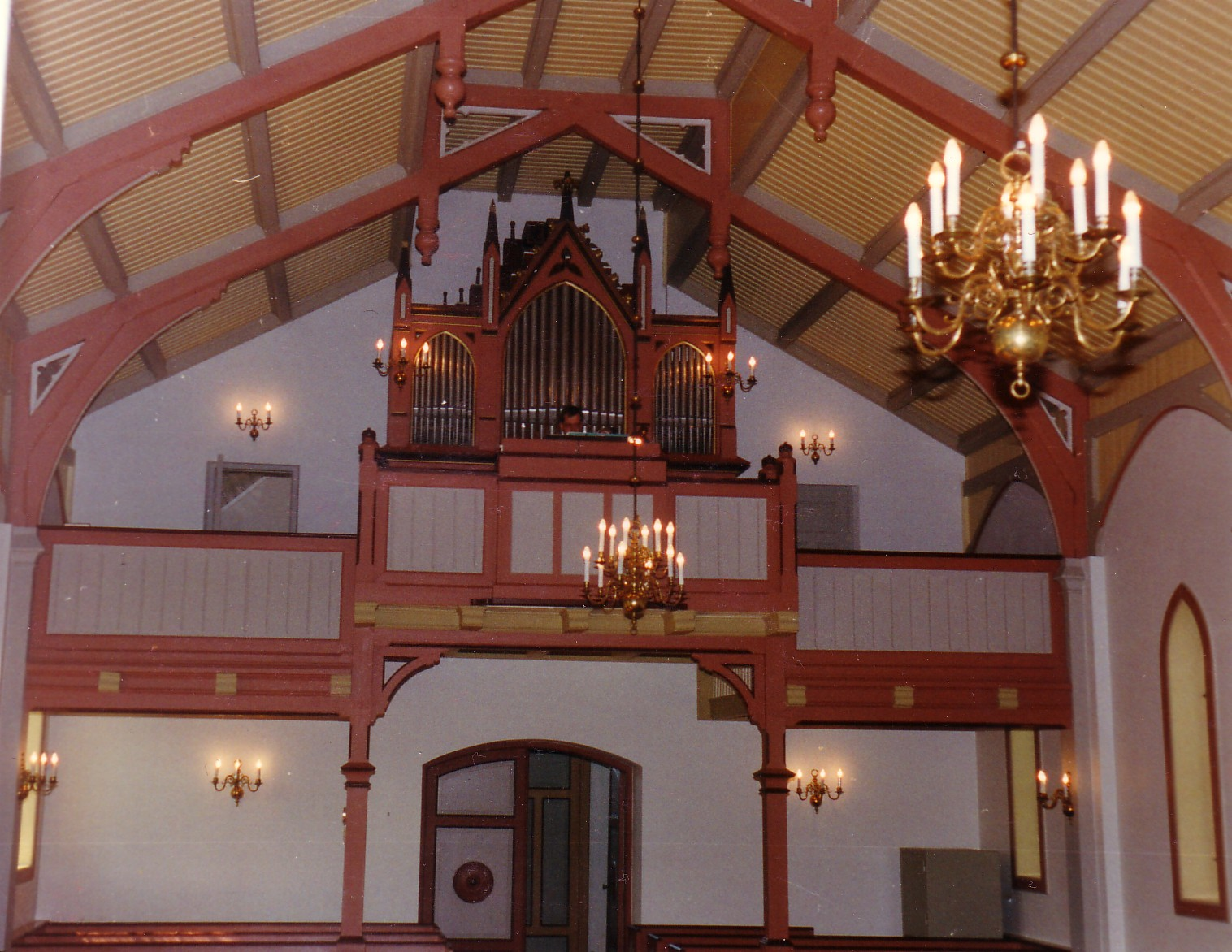

== See also ==
- List of churches in Tunsberg
