= Sjaastad =

Sjaastad may refer to:

- Anders Christian Sjaastad (born 1942), Norwegian politician
- Gustav Adolf Sjaastad (1902–1964), Norwegian politician

== See also ==
- Sjaastad syndrome or chronic paroxysmal hemicrania, a severe debilitating unilateral headache
- Sjåstad, village in Lier municipality, Norway
