= Dunderland Line =

Former railway line in Rana, Norway

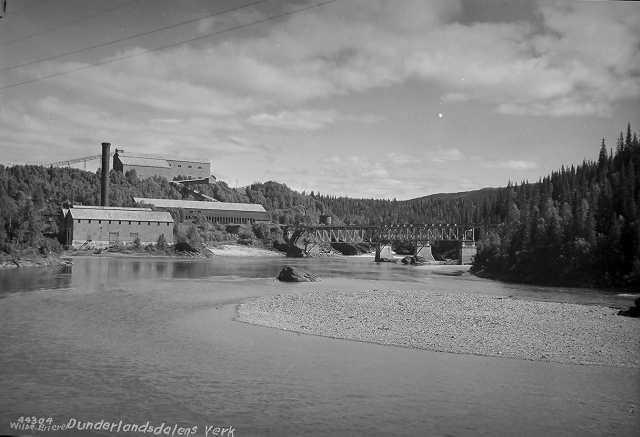

Overview
- Native name: Dunderlandsbanen
- Status: Assimilated into the Nordland Line
- Owner: Dunderland Iron Ore Company
- Termini: Storforshei; Gullsmedvik

Service
- Type: Railway
- Operator(s): Dunderland Iron Ore Company

History
- Opened: 1904

Technical
- Line length: 23.7 km (14.7 mi)
- Number of tracks: Single
- Character: Iron ore freight
- Track gauge: 1,435 mm (4 ft 8 1/2 in) standard gauge
- Electrification: No

The Dunderland Line (Norwegian: Dunderlandsbanen) was a 23.7 km (14.7 mi) railway line between Gullsmedvik in the town of Mo i Rana and the village of Storforshei in Rana Municipality in Nordland county, Norway. Since 1942 the line has been part of the Nordland Line. The line was originally built and owned by Dunderland Iron Ore Company, which used it to freight iron ore from their mine at Storforshei to the port at Gullsmedvik.

The line was built to exploit iron ore which had been discovered by Nils Persson and later sold to Edison Ore-Milling Company. Construction of the line started in 1902, it was completed two years later and revenue services started in 1906. The mine had many operating difficulties, and operations fell to a halt several times for years. With the German occupation of Norway in 1940, the Wehrmacht and Organisation Todt started building the Nordland Line, with the Dunderland Line being upgraded and connected to the mainline on 15 May 1942. After the war, the Norwegian State Railways had to carry out extensive upgrades to the line for it to meet modern standards.

== Route ==
The Dunderland Line was a single track, standard gauge 23.7 km (14.7 mi) railway between Gullsmedvik and Storforshei. It started at Mo i Rana Port at Gullsmedvik and ran up the Dunderland Valley until it reached Rena Mine at Storforshei, following the south shore of the river Ranaelva. After the assimilation with the Nordland Line, the sections to Gullsmedvik and Storfoshei became branch lines of the main line.

The line starts at Gullsmedvik, which is currently located 500.85 km (311.21 mi) from Oslo Central Station. It crosses the river of Tverråga after 0.74 km (0.46 mi) and had a bridge over Plura. After NSB rebuilt the line it received a series of tunnels. Starting at 8.75 km (5.44 mi), the line runs through three tunnels in rapid succession: the 174 m (571 ft) Trolldalen Tunnel, the 616 m (2,021 ft) Reinfossen Tunnel and the 125 m (410 ft) Kalvhaugen Tunnel. At 15.65 km (9.72 mi) the line passes through the 1,760 m (5,770 ft) Illhullia Tunnel. It passes through two last tunnels, the 156 m (512 ft) Gomea Tunnel at 18.9 km (11.7 mi) and the 198 m (650 ft) Smånesli Tunnel before reaching the mine at Storforshei.

== History ==
=== Construction ===
Mining in Rana has taken place since it was established at Ormlia in 1799. Ole Tobias Olsen discovered iron ore on his farm of Nord-Dunderland, for which he registered a mining claim in 1879. Since 1872, Olsen had been working on promoting the construction of the Nordland Line northwards from Trondheim. In 1891, he petitioned the government to look at his claim as a source of national wealth and requested that the Nordland Line be built via the Dunderland Valley to allow shipment of the ore to the coastal port of Mo. He received a grant to carry out technical investigations for a railway.

A Swedish investor took initiative to build a line up the Dunderland Valley as a private railway. Olsen was opposed to this and instead wanted a state railway. As a member of Nordland County Council, he gained the council's support to ask Parliament to finance a state-owned 47 km (29 mi) railway from Mo up the Dunderland Valley. The council alternatively asked for a private railway which the state had unlimited rights to redeem. The line was presumed built in such a way that would make up part of the Nordland Line when it reached Rana.

Based on the redeemable private alternative, Olsen applied in 1896 for concession to build the railway. The application was supported by the municipal council, and the application emphasized that the line would be built with Norwegian capital, Norwegian management and by Norwegian workers. The county council also recommended the concession, although they asked that it be operated as a state railway. However, the concession was rejected by the state.

During the 1880s, Swedish industrialist Nils Persson and his engineer Alfred Hasselbom found large deposits of ore in the Dunderland Valley. Persson secured the mining claims at and also bought land to build a railway and land to build a plant at port at Gullsmedvik. He sold the rights and land for £199,000 to Edison Ore-Milling Company, who established the subsidiary Dunderland Iron Ore Company in 1902 to build and operate the mines and facilities.

Based on the mining laws, DIOC built a railway line to connect the mine to the port facilities, with construction starting in 1902. The largest challenge was a cutting which had to be built through a 40 m (130 ft) tall ridge of a hill. Two thousand people were involved in construction. The railway was completed in 1904, easing shipments from the mine. It was officially handed over from the construction company on 1 November 1904. Revenue service started in 1906.

However, the separation method was not efficient: By 1908 only 87,500 tonnes (86,100 long tons; 96,500 short tons) had been exported, compared to the budgeted 750,000 tonnes (740,000 long tons; 830,000 short tons). DIOC therefore closed operations, including the railway. The company was refinanced in 1913, allowing operations to resume. But the need for new separation technology to start operations delayed the opening because of the First World War. In 1919, lack of coal and the 1920–22 recession also caused a delay, but after that production again started. Production halted again in 1931, but resumed in 1937. British investors bought DIOC in 1938, but because of the ore's high phosphorus content, only German mills were interested in purchasing the ore. After Germany declared war on the United Kingdom on 3 September 1939, production was halted.

=== Assimilation ===
With the German occupation of Norway during the Second World War, construction of the Nordland Line, which by then had reached Mosjøen, became subordinate to the Wehrmacht. It contracted the work to Organisation Todt, which subcontracted German and Austrian construction companies, largely using prisoners of war as work force. The Nordland Line opened between Mosjøen and Mo i Rana on 28 February 1942. Originally Wehrmacht had instructed that Storforshei would be the terminus of the Nordland Line, but in January 1942 they ordered that the line should continue northwards.

The Dunderland Line was under-dimensioned for NSB's standards, so the entire line needed to be upgraded. Major projects included replacing wooden bridges with either steel bridges or embankments, and covering the open culverts. Sections which were rebuilt included those past Tverrånes, Avakåsa, Plura, Illhullia and Gomea. The old line was highly susceptible to landslides, forcing NSB to rebuild parts of the line with tunnels. There were originally 45 curves with a radius of under 300 m (980 ft) which had to be rebuilt.

NSB started operations on the Dunderland Line on 15 May 1942. The section of the Dunderland Line from Guldsmedvik to Tverånes and from Bjørnhei to Storforshei was not included in the Nordland Line, becoming two spurs. On 12 April 1943, traffic opened on the section between Mo i Rana to Nevernes, consisting of 3 km (1.9 mi) from Mo to Tverånes, the Dunderland Line from Tverånes to Bjørnhei and the 4.4 km (2.7 mi) section from Bjørnhei to Nevernes. At the time, the line had a maximum permitted axle load of 12 tonnes (12 long tons; 13 short tons), and a maximum permitted speed of 40 km/h (25 mph) from Mo to Bjørnhei and 20 km/h (12 mph) to Nevernes.

The Dunderland Line was bought by the state for 2.5 million Norwegian krone in 1947. The construction work on the Nordland Line was of poor quality, resulting in low operating speeds. NSB was therefore forced to redo large parts of the German work after the war. By 1959, NSB had used NOK 45.7 million to upgrade the section from Mo to Storforshei.
