= Nils Persson =

Nils Persson may refer to:

- Nils Persson (sailor)
- Nils Persson (industrialist)
