= Vestbygda, Ringerike =

Village in Buskerud, Norway

Coordinates: 60°14′N 9°52′E

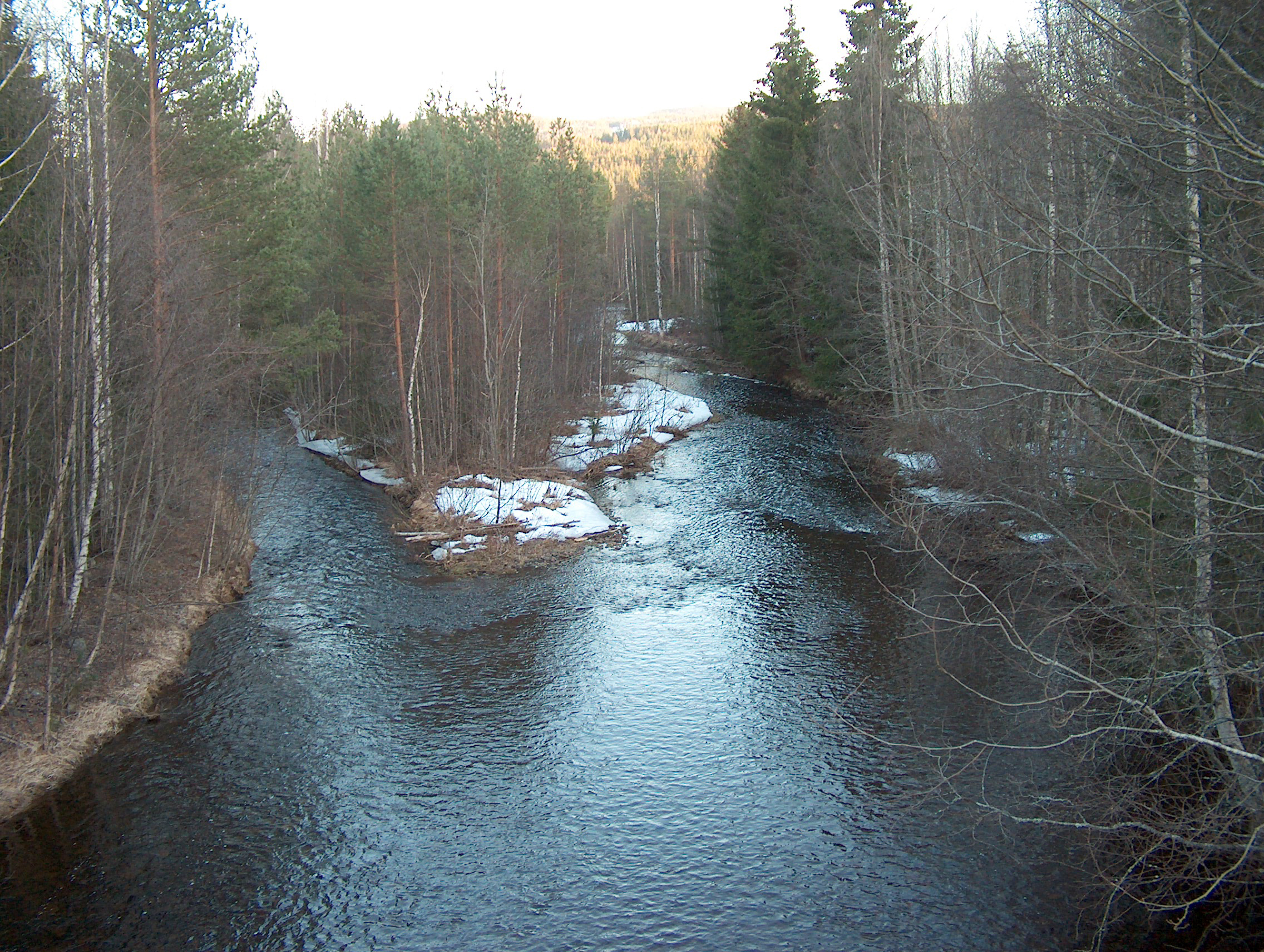
Rudselva River from Aalde bru

Vestbygda is a village in the municipality of Ringerike in the county of Buskerud, Norway.

Vestbygda is located just west of the village of Sokna in the valley of Soknedalen. Vestbygda stretches south along two small fishing lakes, Torevannet and Bliksrud-Langevannet, to the border with Krødsherad. The village extends southwest from Aalde bru over the Rudselva river and south toward the village of Brekkebygda. This part of the valley is characterized by agriculture along the lakes and coniferous forests along the hillsides.

Vestbygda Road (Vestbygdveien) or Norwegian county road Fv179 (Solli - Sokna Sentrum ved Sokna) runs from Norwegian National Road Rv7 (Riksvei 7) at Sokna along the north side of the river and west along lake Torevannet and the Eidselva river through Vestbygda to Solli by lake Eidsdammen in the village of Bjørkelangen in Aurskog, Akershus County where the road again meets Rv7. Vestbygda belongs to the Lunder parish, with Lunder Church (Lunder kyrkje) in Sokna the main church.
