= Allerum =

Locality in Sweden

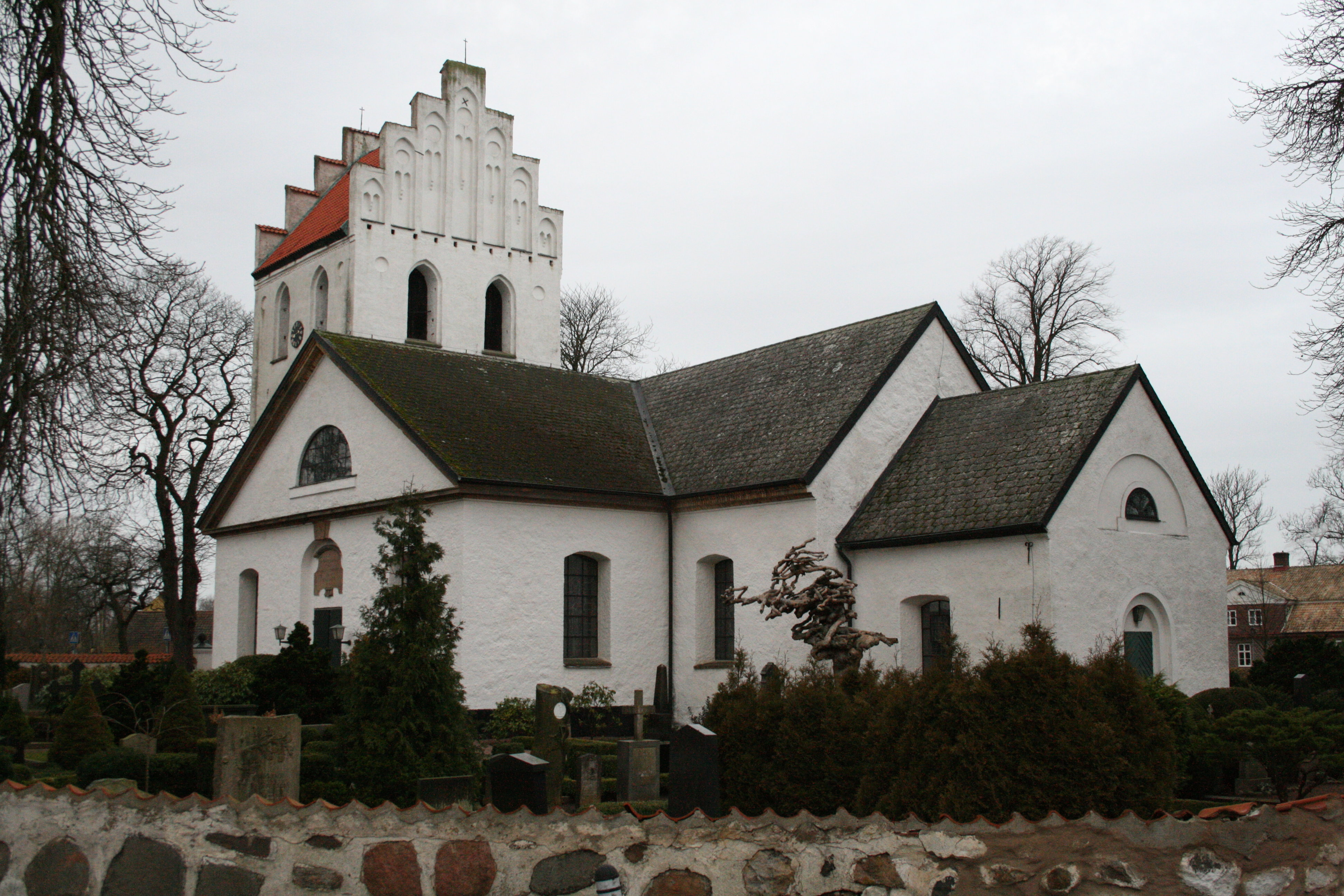
- Allerum Church

- Location within Skåne Location within Sweden
- Coordinates: 56°07′N 12°41′E
- Country: Sweden
- Province: Skåne
- County: Skåne County
- Municipality: Helsingborg Municipality

Area
  - Total: 0.78 km^{2} (0.30 sq mi)

Population (31 December 2010)
  - Total: 716
  - Density: 919/km^{2} (2,380/sq mi)
- Time zone: UTC+1 (CET)
  - Summer (DST): UTC+2 (CEST)

Allerum is a locality situated in Helsingborg Municipality, Skåne County, Sweden with 716 inhabitants in 2010. Allerum Church contains an altarpiece by artist Johan Christoffer Boklund and fragments of medieval mural paintings.

== Notable people ==
Notable people that were born or lived in Allerum include:

- Nils Persson (1836–1916), Swedish consul, businessman, and politician
