= Allerum Church =

- Allerums kyrka
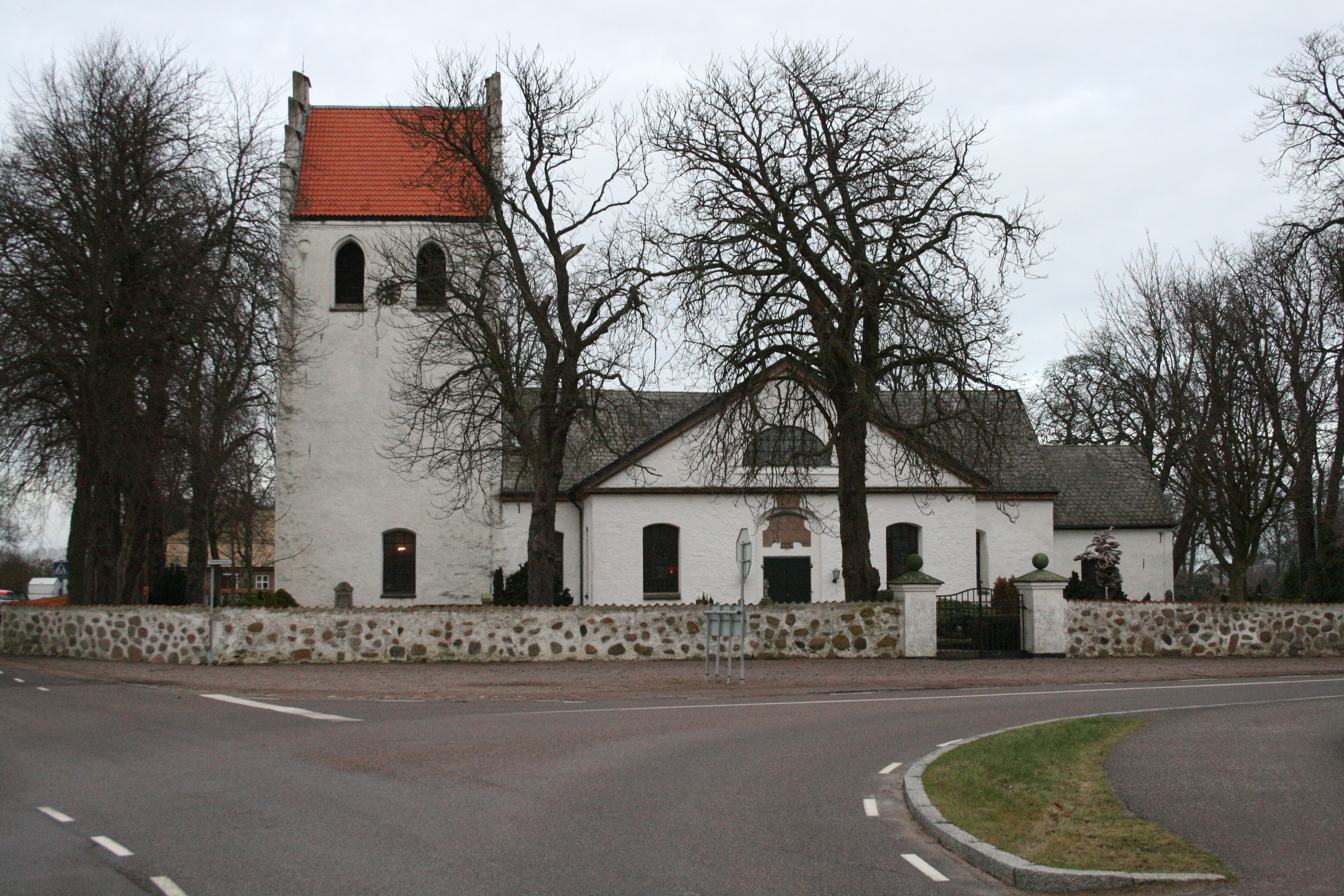
- Allerum Church

- 56°06′32″N 12°41′30″E
- Country: Sweden
- Denomination: Church of Sweden

Administration
- Diocese: Lund

Allerum Church (Swedish: Allerums kyrka) is a church in Allerum, in the province of Skåne, Sweden. The tower and chancel of the church are medieval, while the rest of the church was heavily rebuilt during the 18th and 19th centuries. It contains an altarpiece by artist Johan Christoffer Boklund and fragments of medieval mural paintings.

== History and architecture ==
Allerum Church was built in the 1150s and originally consisted of a nave and a chancel with an apse. It was enlarged in the 14th century, and the tower was built during the 15th century. A church porch was built c. 1500. Only the tower and chancel remain of the medieval church. In 1767 the southern transept was built, and at that time the apse was also demolished. The northern transept was built in 1834, and the interior of the church equipped with a barrel vault. The northern church porch was also demolished. The church underwent a major renovation in 1910. During the renovation, a decorated Romanesque tympanon from the former southern portal was discovered in the vicinity of the church. It is today in the Historical Museum at Lund University in Lund.

The church still contains remains of medieval murals. The walls of the chancel contains fragments of Romanesque paintings as well as paintings from the late Middle Ages. The sacristy contains murals from the 16th century that depict the Binding of Isaac and Samson and the lion. The oldest item in the church is the unadorned baptismal font from the 12th century. The altarpiece is from 1861 and made by artist Johan Christoffer Boklund, who was born at nearby Kulla Gunnarstorp Castle. The church has two church bells, of which the oldest is from 1520 and contains an inscription to Saint Giles. The other bell is from 1636.
