= Torpo Station =

Railway station in Norway

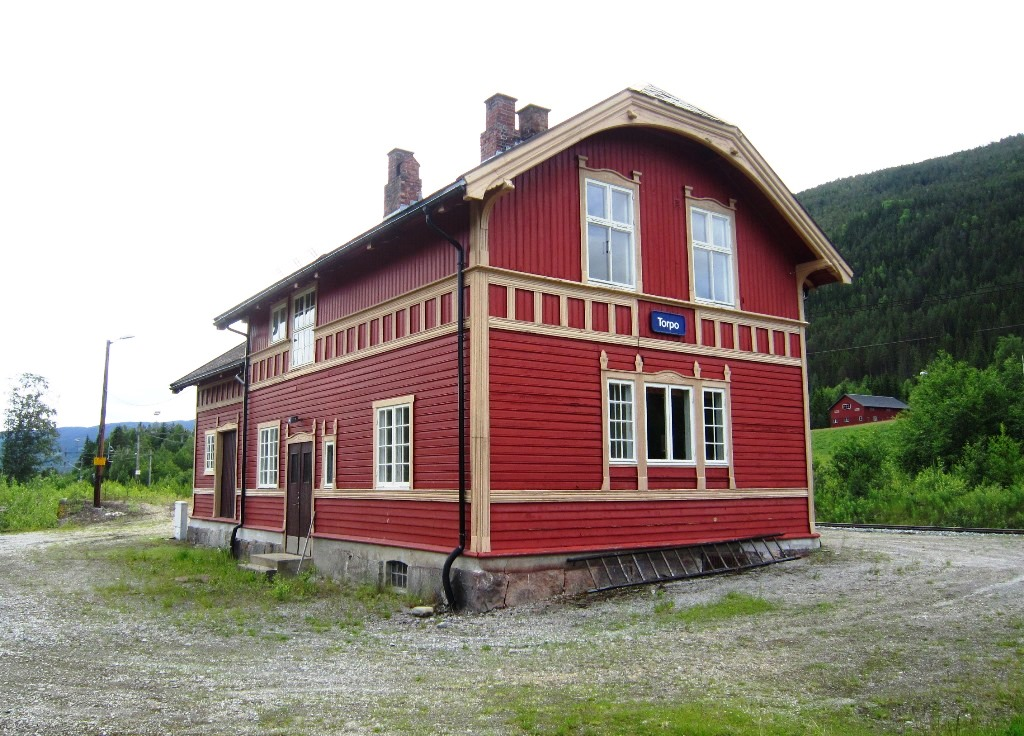
- Torpo Railway Station in 2013

General information
- Location: Norway
- Coordinates: 60°39′35″N 8°42′58″E
- Elevation: 330 m (1,080 ft)
- Line: Bergensbanen
- Platforms: 1
- Connections: Ål Station, Gol Station

Construction
- Architect: Paul Armin Due

History
- Opened: 1907
- Closed: 2000
Location
- Location within Norway

The Torpo Railway Station (Norwegian: Torpo stasjon) is a retired railway station located at Torpo in Buskerud county, Norway. It is now used as a crossing track.

== History ==
The station opened on December 21, 1907. The village that gave the station its name changed its name from Torpe to Torpo in April 1935 which caused the station to follow suit. The station was remotely controlled on December 9, 1983, and made unstaffed on January 1, 1984. Passenger train service ceased on June 2, 1991, but was resumed from May 29, 1994, to April 20, 2000, and nowadays, the former station serves as a crossing track. The station building, built using red-painted wood in Art Nouveau style with drawings by Paul Armin Due, is still standing.
