= Hennummarka =

- Village
- Interactive map of Hennummarka
- Coordinates: 59°49′30″N 10°17′10″E
- Time zone: UTC+01:00 (CET)

Hennummarka is a village in Lier municipality, Norway. Located just north of the village Tranby, it is a part of the urban area Tranby which has a population of 5,580.
