= Skogan =

Skogan may also refer to:

== People ==
- Else Skogan, Norwegian curler
- John Kristen Skogan (born 1942), Norwegian political scientist and politician

== Other uses ==
- Skogan Peak, mountain summit in Canada
