= Torpo =

Village in Ål Municipality, Norway

Coordinates: 60°40′N 8°43′E

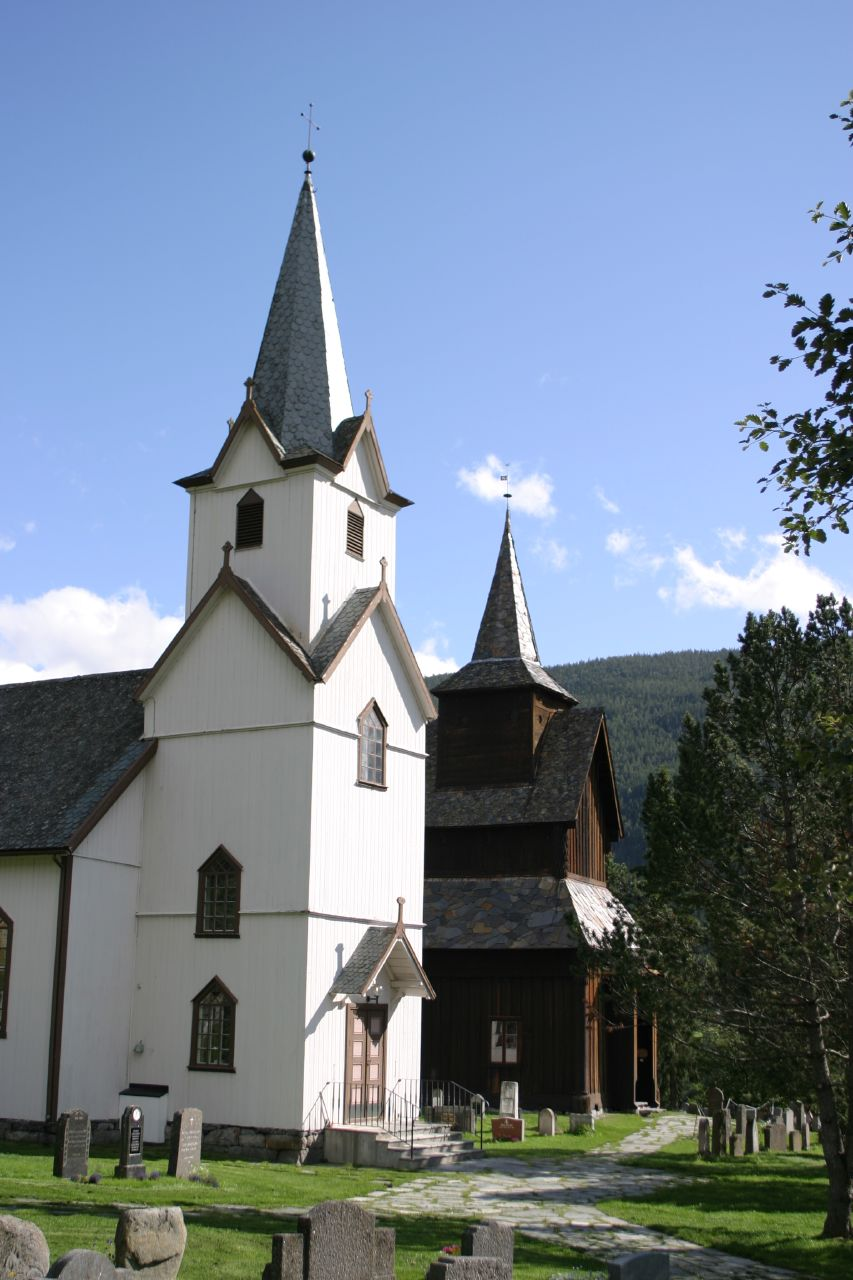
Torpo Church and Torpo Stave Church

Torpo is a small village in Ål municipality, in Buskerud County, Norway, and can be reached by using highway 7.

The name Torpo was adopted July 1, 1935 from the old name Torpe. At this date the train station and local post office started using the new adopted name.

Torpo is located in Hallingdal between the municipal centers of Ål and Gol. It is adjacent to the villages of Lien and Opheim. The village has 405 inhabitants per 1 January 2009. Previously Torpo was a stopover on the Bergen Railway. Torpo Railway Station, which is in Art Nouveau style, is closed but still standing.

Torpo is the site of two notable churches. Torpo Church (Torpo kirke) was built in 1880 using plans by architect A. Keitel Moss based on a design by Conrad Fredrik von der Lippe (1833–1901). It was constructed of wood and has 200 seats. In the 1960s it was restored with plans drawn up by architect Peter Helland-Hansen.

Torpo Stave Church is the biggest attraction in the village. Torpo Stave Church was built around 1190–1200. It has a steady stream of visiting tourists during the summer.
