= Solumsmoen =

Solumsmoen is a Norwegian surname. Notable people with the surname include:

- Odd Solumsmoen (1917–1986), Norwegian novelist and literary critic
- Olaf Solumsmoen (1896–1972), Norwegian newspaper editor and politician
