= Opheim, Norway =

Village in Ål, Buskerud County, Norway

Coordinates: 60°40′12″N 08°40′42″E

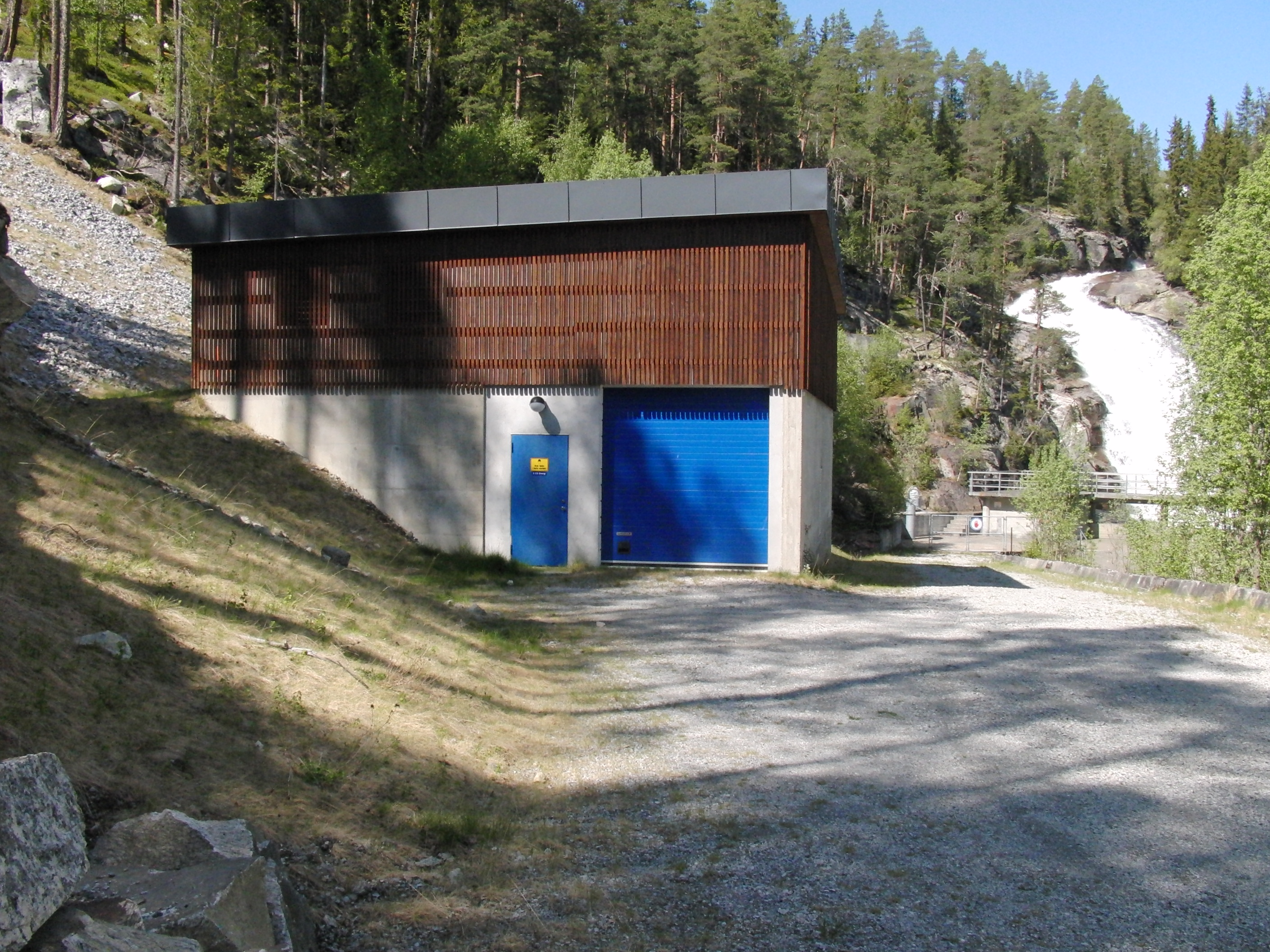
Lya kraftverk i Ål kommune

Opheim is a village in Ål municipality in Buskerud, Norway.

Opheim is situated in the north of the valley of Hallingdal. The traditional industry in the area is mostly agriculture with some forestry. The Lya River runs through the village and into the Hallingdalselva at Torpo. Lya Power Plant (Lya kraftverk i Ål kommune) is a hydroelectric power plant situated between Opheim and Torpo. It uses water flow from the Lya river for power generation by E-CO Energi. The power plant was completed in 2008 with a 1,400 meter long pipeline from the intake in the river Lya.
