= Oddevall =

Village in Lier, Buskerud, Norway

Coordinates: 59.8619°N 10.2172°E

Oddevall is a village in Lier municipality, county of Buskerud, Norway. Oddevall and the neighboring village of Sjåstad are regarded as a single community with a combined population of 556 residents as of 1 January 2014.
