= Egge, Buskerud =

Village in Norway

Coordinates: 59°49′N 10°13′E

Egge is a small village in Lier in Buskerud, Norway. It is the location of Egge Farm (Egge Gård) which is noted for its fruit orchards.
