= Nils Persson (industrialist) =

Swedish politician (1836–1916)

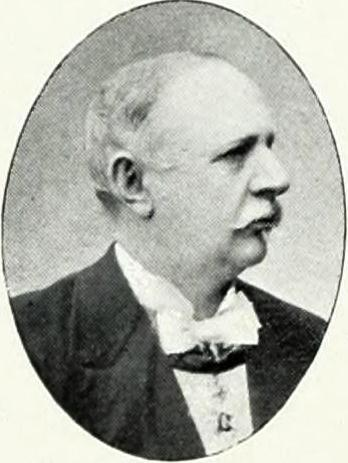
- Born: January 20, 1836; Allerum, Sweden
- Died: April 28, 1916 (aged 80); Helsingborg, Sweden
- Occupation(s): Politician, banker

Nils Persson (January 20, 1836 – April 28, 1916) was a Swedish consul, businessman, and politician from Helsingborg.

Persson was born in Allerum, Sweden. He started his career as a fifteen-year-old in 1851, as a shop assistant in a store run by his uncle. In 1860 he opened his own business, where he imported and sold guano for use in fertilizers. The operation went well, and from 1872 to 1875 he ran the company Nils Persson's guano-svavvelsyrefabrik (Nils Persson's Guano–Sulfuric Acid Factory) in Helsingborg. In 1875 he became the director and chairman of the company Skånska superfosfat- og svafvelsyrefabrik AB (Skåne Superphosphate and Sulfuric Acid Factory, now part of Kemira), also in Helsingborg. For this he needed phosphate and sulfuric acid. In the beginning, the phosphorus was obtained from fossil bones, but soon he started imported phosphorus from Florida and North Africa.

In 1887, Persson started the company Sulitjelma Mines in Norway, where he extracted pyrite. The ore in Sulitjelma was also rich in copper, which resulted in him co-founding the Helsingborg Copper Works (Helsingborgs Kobarverk AB) in 1900 together with a sulfuric acid plant. In Norway, he also mined iron ore. In 1901, he sold his rights in the Dunderland Valley to the Edison Ore-Milling Syndicate Limited. The sale price was reported to be NOK 3 million, which was partly transferred in the form of bonds in the company. Persson was requested to become the "consulting director" of the company, owned by 55 stakeholders, of whom 52 were English. The Edison Ore-Milling Syndicate had been created to exploit a method invented by Thomas Edison. The new method involved processing the iron ore with an electromagnetic separator, resulting in iron concentrates, which were then used to produce pig iron and steel. In 1903, Persson, together with the engineer Alfred Hasselbom, discovered and acquired the rights to the ore deposits in Salangen Municipality in Troms county. In 1906, Persson sold his rights in Salangen to two German companies. In 1907, the company Salangen Mining Limited (Salangen Bergverksaktiebolag) started up the Salang Works (Salangsverket), which were closed down in 1912 after a short but busy period of operation.

Persson was criticized by some Norwegians for his profitable business in Norway. By a royal decree of October 28, 1907, he and the Røstvangen Company Ltd. (Aktieselskabet Røstvangen) were refused their joint application for a license to acquire mining rights at the Røstvangen deposits in Hedmark, in the same area where the Røstvangen Mines had been established in 1904.

From 1875 to 1903, Persson served as the vice-consul for the Netherlands. From 1894 to 1911 he was the German consul in Helsingborg. Persson died in Helsingborg.
