= Tranby =

Village in Buskerud, Norway

- Interactive map of Tranby
- Coordinates: 59°49′N 10°15′E

Area
  - Total: 2.06 km^{2} (0.80 sq mi)

Population (2020)
  - Total: 5,322
  - Density: 2,585/km^{2} (6,700/sq mi)

Tranby is a village in Lier municipality in Buskerud, Norway.

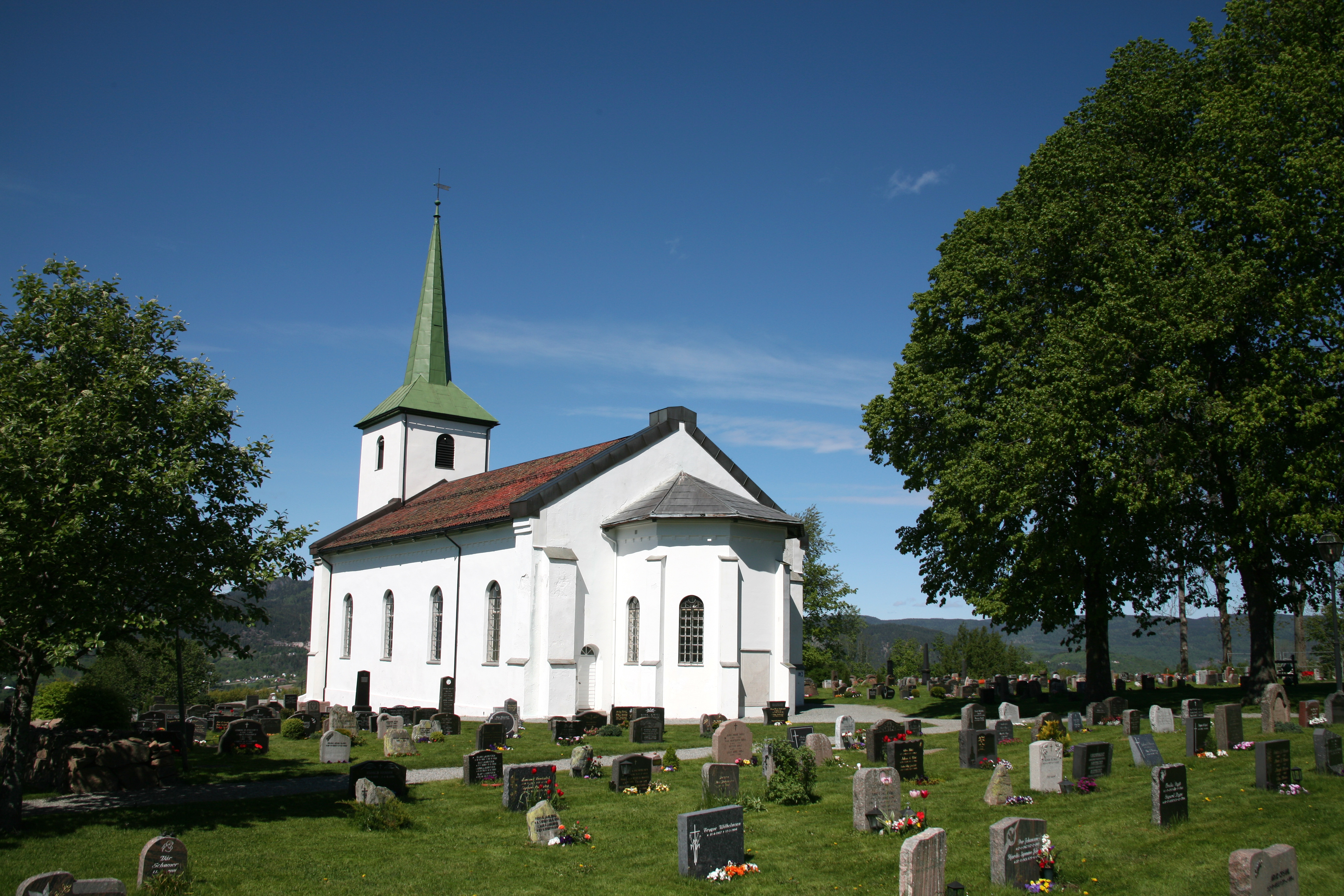
Tranby Church

The village consists mainly of three residential areas located in a semi-circle around a small forest area. Tranby is a part of a greater urban area which also encompasses the village of Hennummarka. The urban area is named Tranby and has a population of 5,322.

Tranby Church (Tranby kirke) dates from 1855. It was designed by architects Heinrich Ernst Schirmer and Wilhelm von Hanno. The edifice is constructed of stone and has 360 seats. Access to the site is via Rv282 and Rv285.

== Name ==
The name Tranby comes from the Old Norse name Trandabýr. The prefix Tranda may come from Trǫnd or Trǫnn, meaning "something around (a physical object)". The suffix býr derives from bý, which means "farm". A possible translation of Trandabýr could therefore be "something around a farm".

== Education ==
Hallingstad school is the elementary school (Barneskole) in Tranby. Right next to it lies Tranby school, which is the lower secondary school (Ungdomsskole).

== Notable locations ==
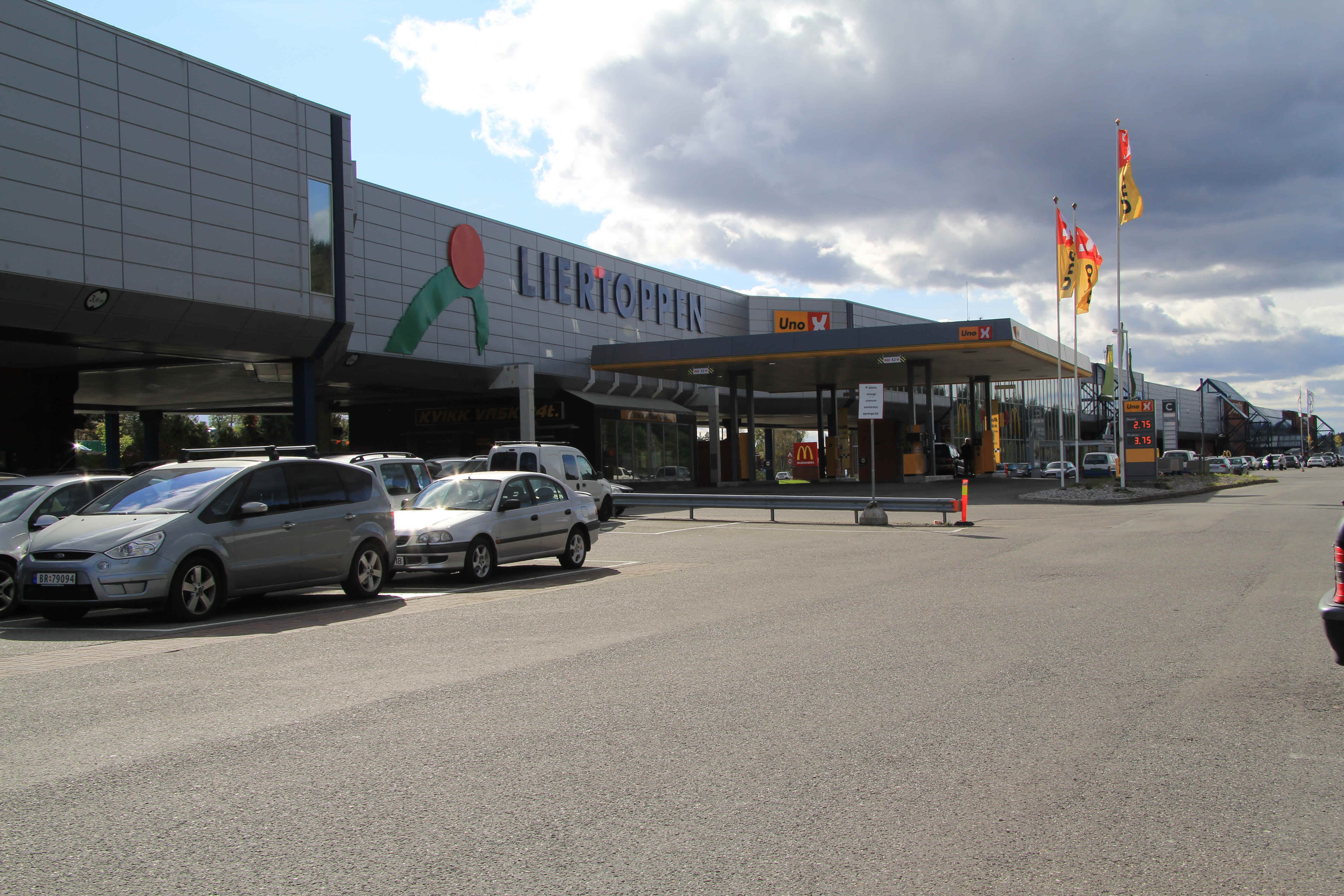
Liertoppen shopping centre

The Liertoppen shopping centre is located next to the European route E18, which runs past Tranby.

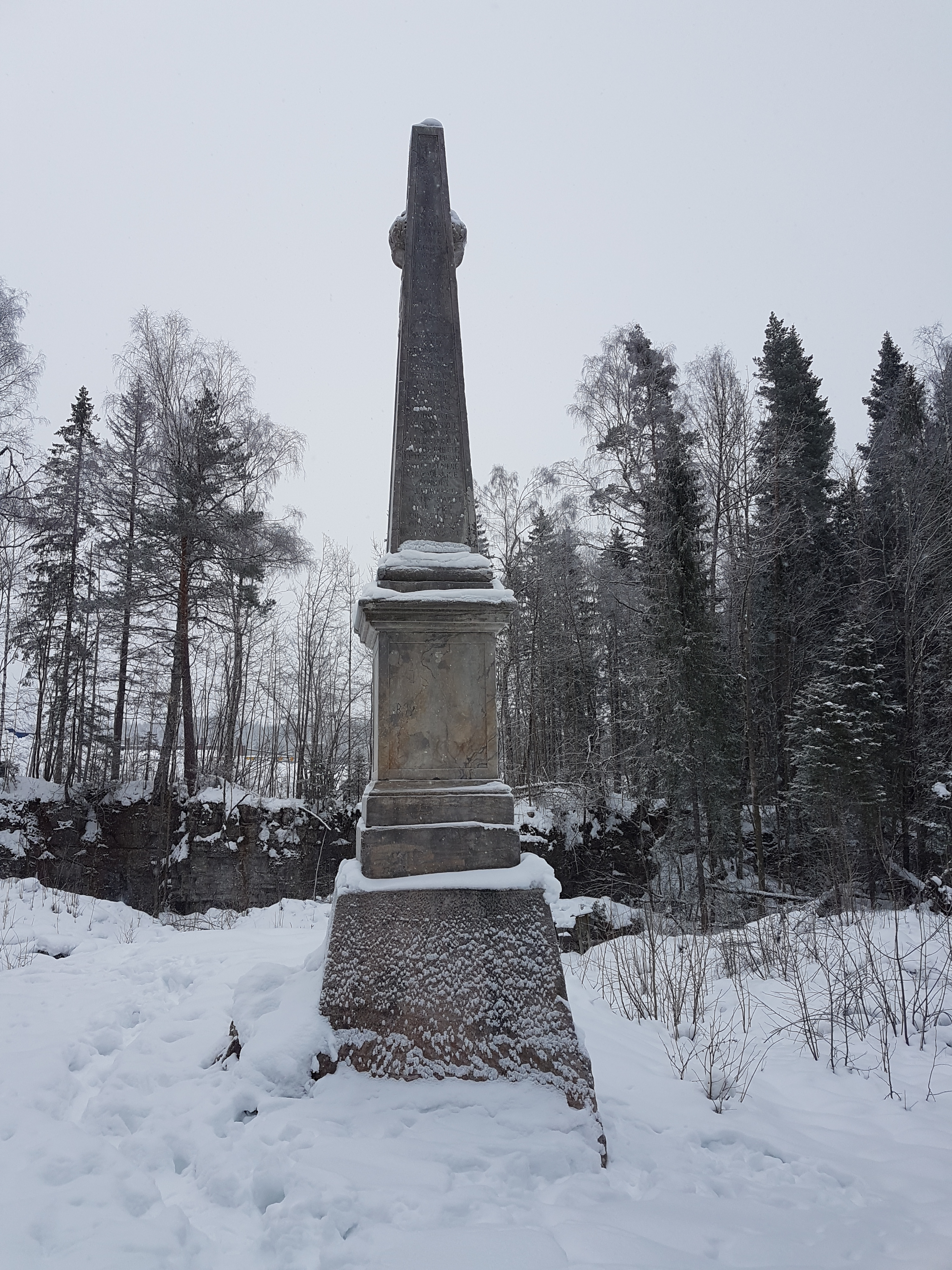
The obelisk at the former marble quarry

There is also an 8 m (approximately 26′3″) tall marble obelisk located at a former marble quarry in the nearby Gjellebekk forest. It was erected during King Frederick V's visit to the area in 1749. Some of the marble from the quarry was used to help with the construction of Frederik's Church, also known as The Marble Church, in Copenhagen, Denmark. Ruins of an earlier sconce used during the Great Northern War, especially during King Charles XII's invasion of Norway in 1716, can be found in the area near the obelisk.

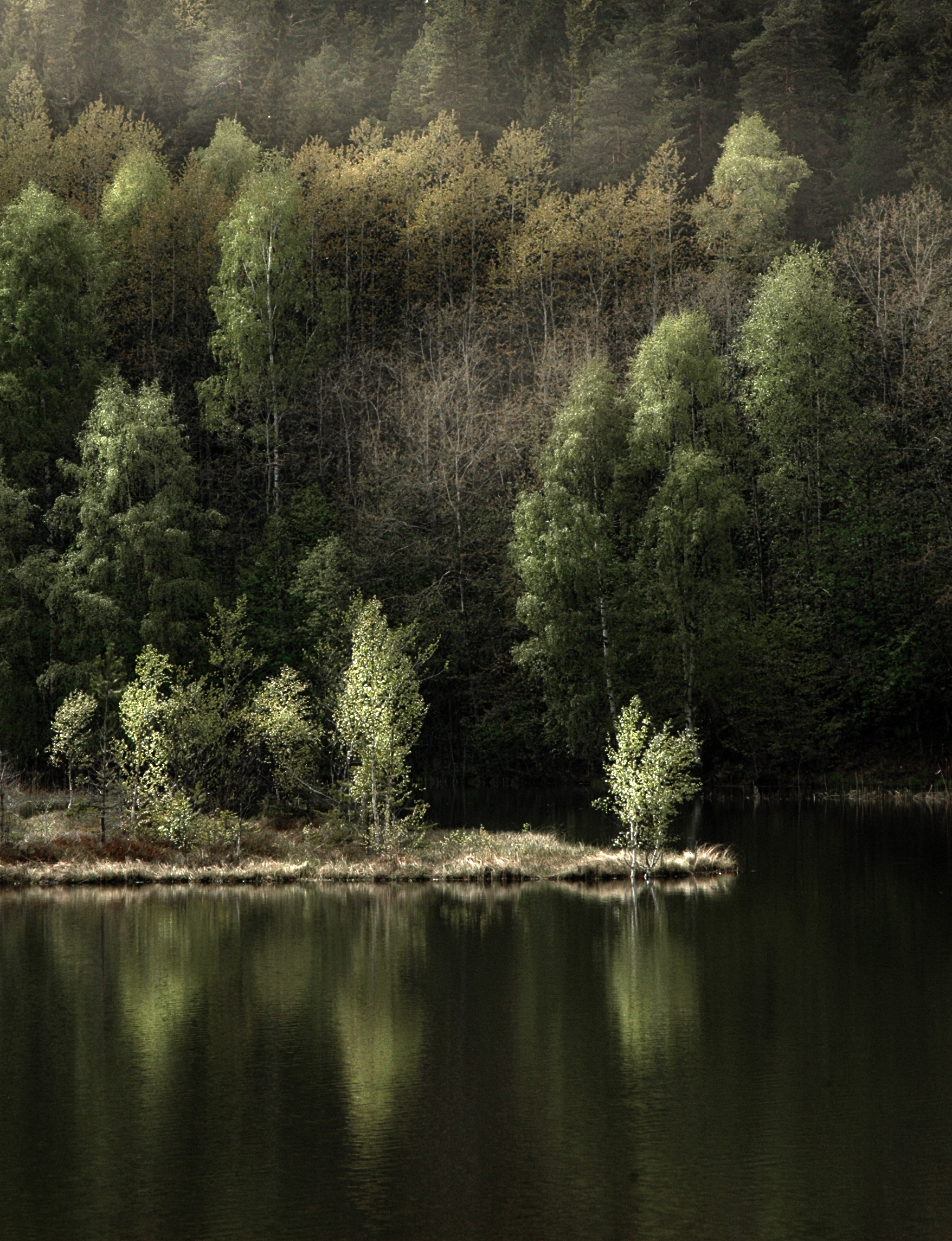
Damtjern (Lier)

The nearby lake Damtjern (Lier) is a popular location for activities like swimming and fishing.

== Notable residents ==
- Martin Kolberg
- Thorbjørn Jagland

== Business life ==
Several companies have established themselves in Tranby, with Aker Solutions ASA (formerly Aker Kværner and Kværner Eureka) being the largest.

== Climate ==
Climate data for Lier 1991–2020 (39 m, avg high/low 2013-2025)
Month	Jan	Feb	Mar	Apr	May	Jun	Jul	Aug	Sep	Oct	Nov	Dec	Year
Mean daily maximum °C (°F)	−0.2 (31.6)	1.9 (35.4)	6.6 (43.9)	12.4 (54.3)	17.7 (63.9)	22 (72)	23.5 (74.3)	21.6 (70.9)	17.7 (63.9)	11 (52)	5.7 (42.3)	1.6 (34.9)	11.8 (53.3)
Daily mean °C (°F)	−2.9 (26.8)	−2.4 (27.7)	0.8 (33.4)	5.6 (42.1)	10.8 (51.4)	14.7 (58.5)	17.1 (62.8)	15.7 (60.3)	11.6 (52.9)	5.9 (42.6)	1.7 (35.1)	−2.2 (28.0)	6.4 (43.5)
Mean daily minimum °C (°F)	−6.2 (20.8)	−4.9 (23.2)	−2.6 (27.3)	0.7 (33.3)	5.8 (42.4)	10 (50)	11.9 (53.4)	10.5 (50.9)	8.2 (46.8)	3.5 (38.3)	−0.2 (31.6)	−4 (25)	2.7 (36.9)
Average precipitation mm (inches)	65 (2.6)	49 (1.9)	55 (2.2)	45 (1.8)	62 (2.4)	65 (2.6)	78 (3.1)	88 (3.5)	100 (3.9)	105 (4.1)	85 (3.3)	63 (2.5)	860 (33.9)
Source 1: yr.no
Source 2: Seklima (avg highs/lows)
