= Sjåstad =

Village in Lier, Buskerud, Norway

Coordinates: 59°51′25″N 10°12′42″E

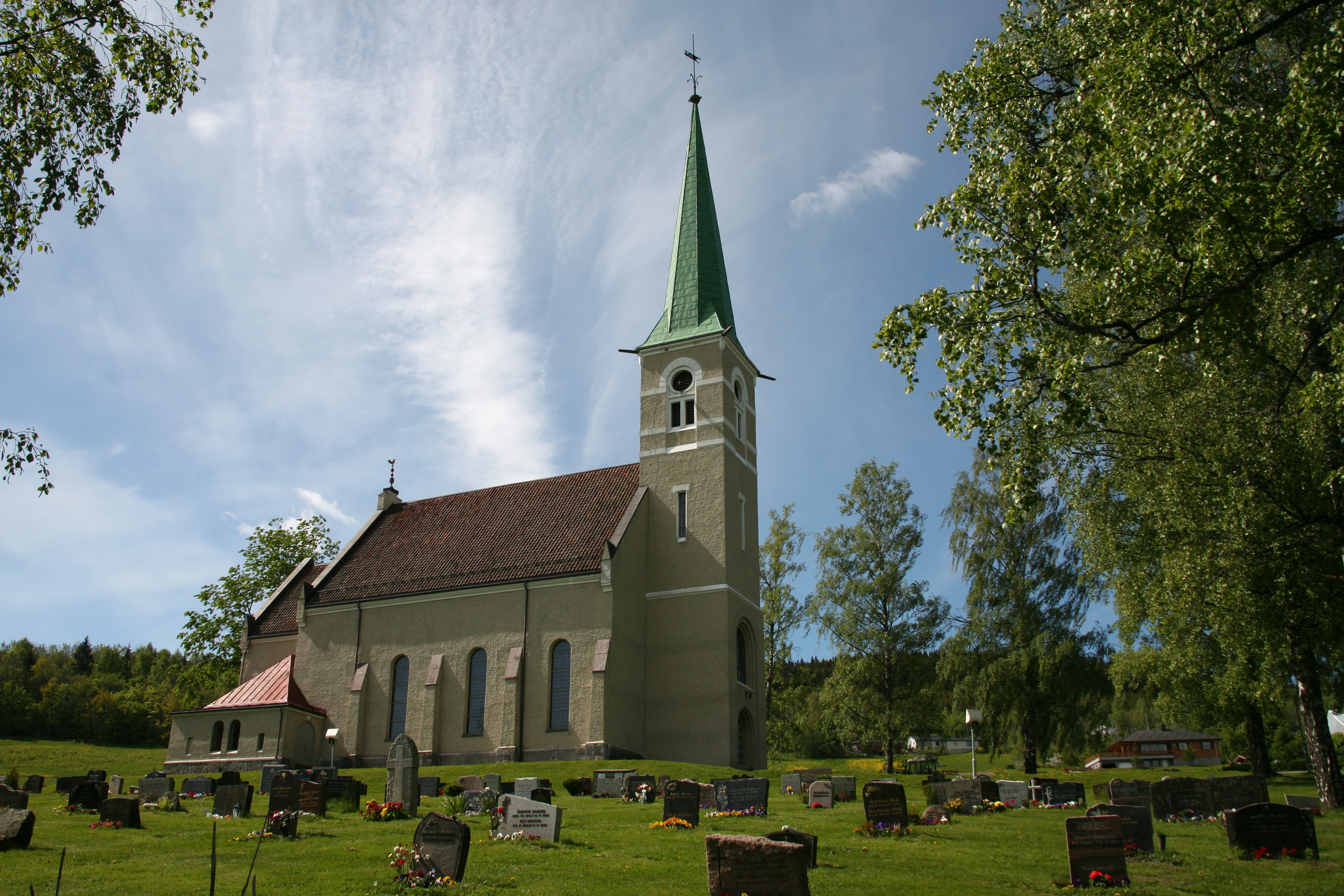
Sjåstad Church

Sjåstad is a village in Lier municipality, Buskerud county, Norway. Sjåstad and the neighboring village of Oddevall are regarded as one community. The two villages have a combined population of 556 (2014).

Sjåstad is the site of Sjåstad Church (Sjåstad Kirke). The church was designed by architect Henry Bucher.It was dedicated during 1896. It is constructed of stone and has a seating capacity of 370.
