= Sokna =

Village in Ringerike, Norway

Coordinates: 60°14′N 9°54′E

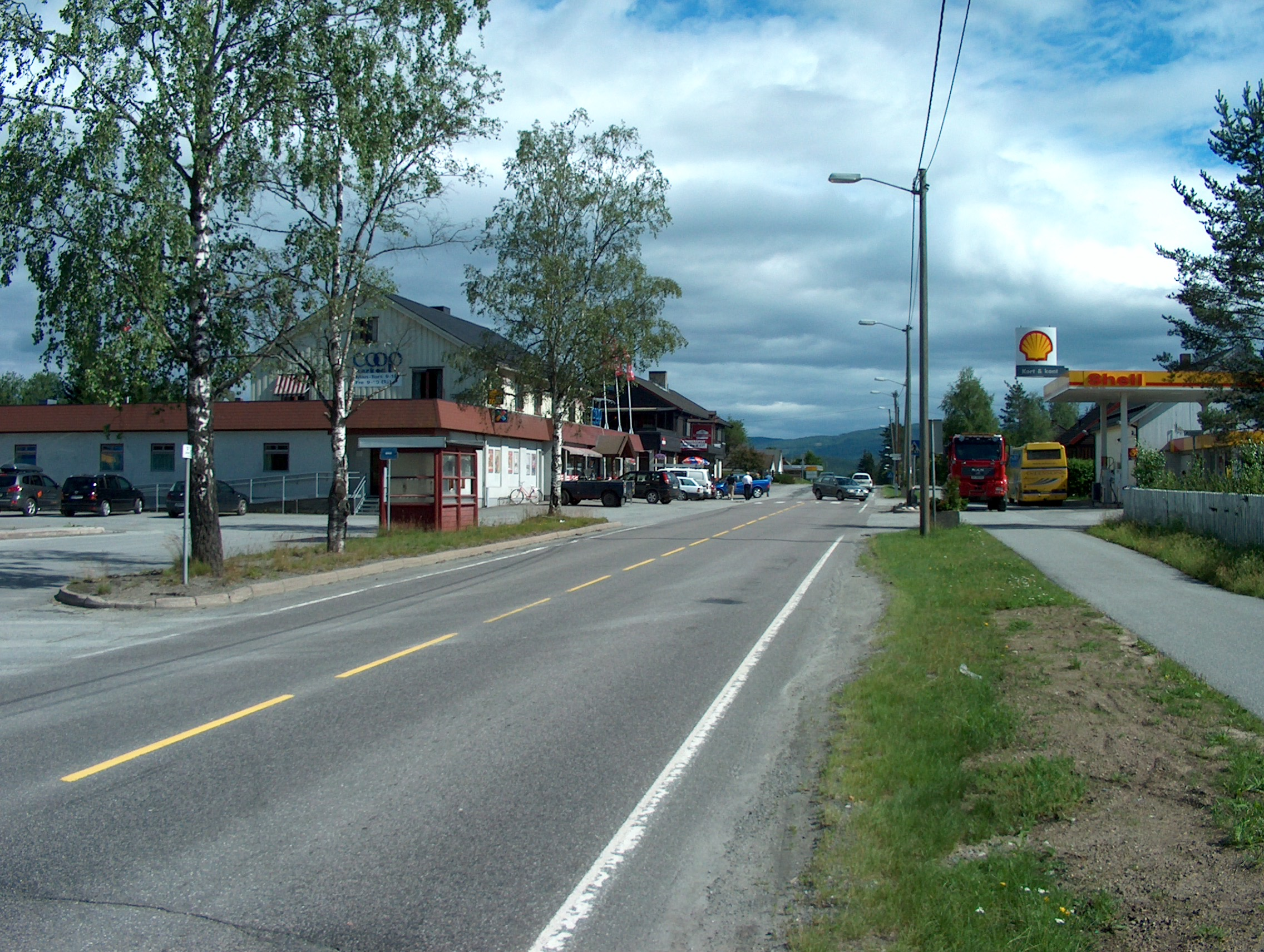
Sokna

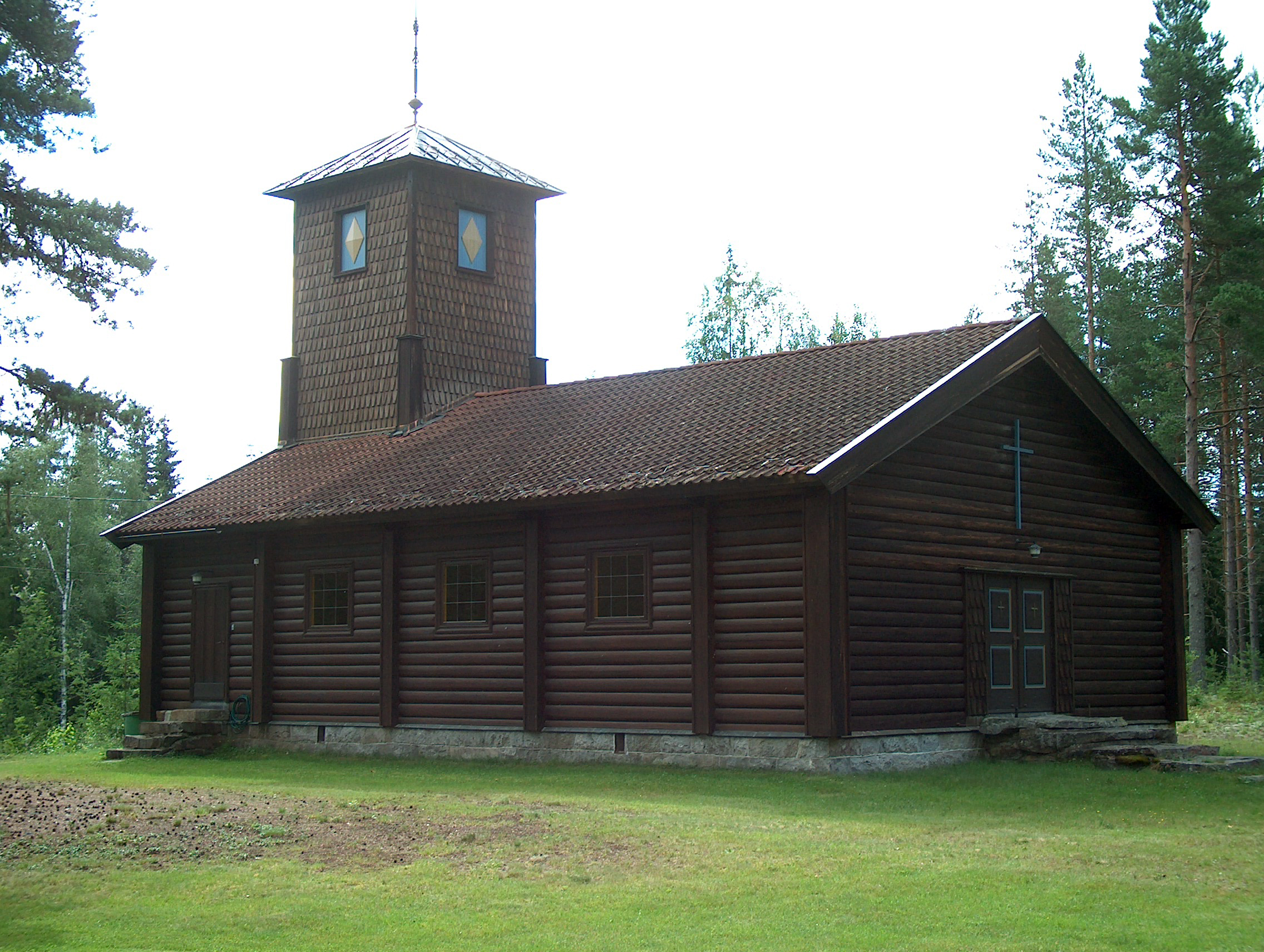
Strømsoddbygde Chapel

Sokna is a small village located between Hønefoss and Krøderen in the municipality of Ringerike, in the county of Buskerud, Norway. Its population is 543.

== Location ==
Sokna is located in the valley of Soknedalen, between the Sogna and Verkenselva rivers. Sogna is a small river that starts at the end of Lake Sognevannet in Strømsoddbygda at the top of the valley of Sokndalen and empties into Tyrifjorden. The Verkenselva flows into the Sogna just southeast of Sokna. Norwegian National Road 7 (RV 7) runs through the village, as does the Bergen Line which extends between Hønefoss and Hallingdal, although rail trains no longer stop at Sokna.

Sokna is situated close to large open forested areas including Holleia, Brekkebygda and Strømsoddbygda as well as the Ådalsfjella mountain range. It is also not far to Hønefoss (around 23 km) and Norefjell (around 32 km).

== Etymology ==
The name of Sokna originated with the Old Norse word Sókn meaning parish.

== Lunder Church ==
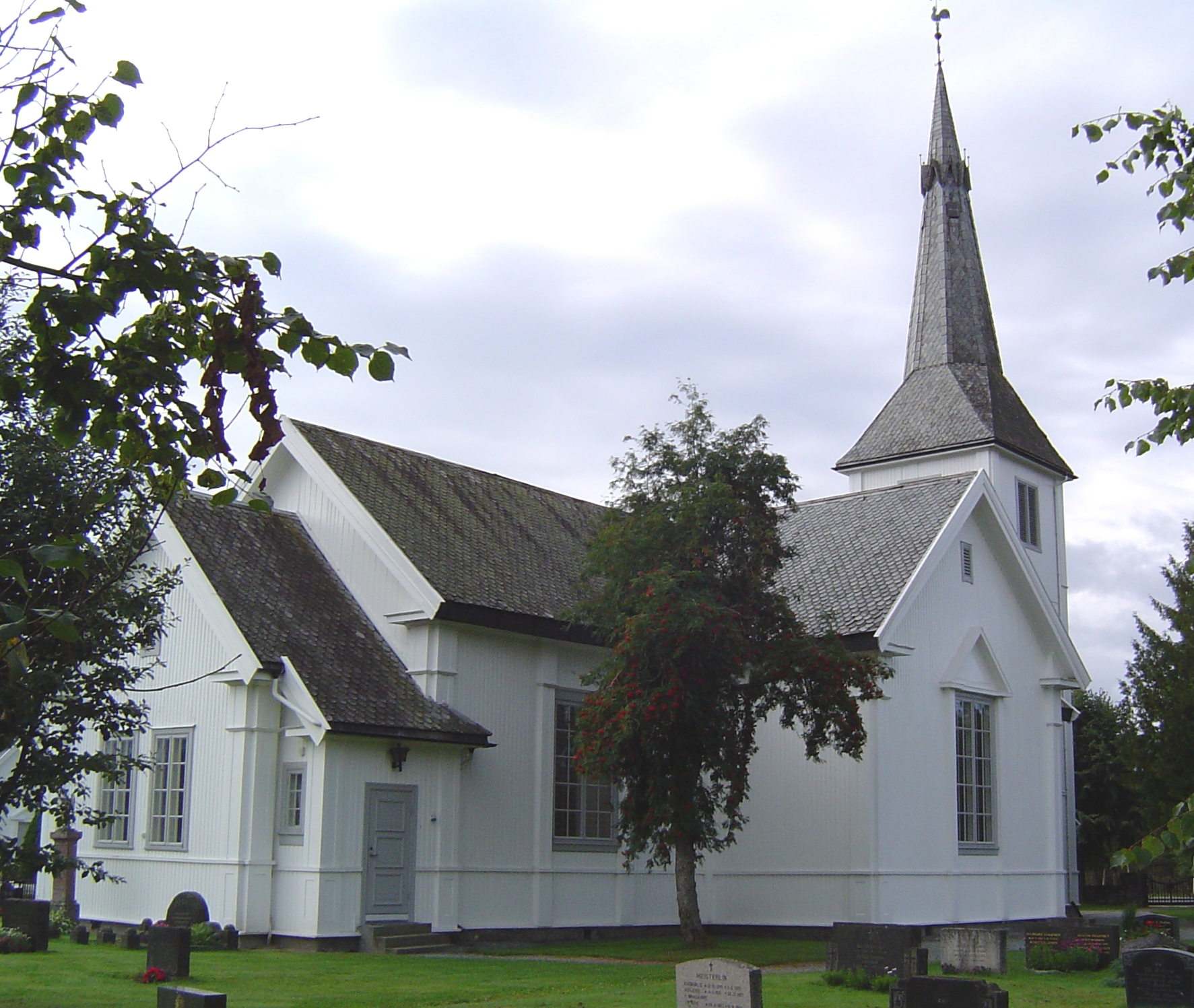
Lunder Church

Lunder Church (Lunder kirke) situated at the village Sokna is the church of Lunder parish. It is a cruciform church, with an exterior clad with staff panel. Lunder Church dates to 1706 when it was consecrated a new church which was called Our Savior Church. The church was moved to where it now lies at the end of 1750. Renovation and reconstruction took place in 1761. Since then the church has been restored several times, including in the 1880 (architect: Henrik Nissen) and in 1922-1924 (architect:Ole Stein).

Strømsoddbygde Chapel (Strømsoddbygda kapell) is located in the forested area of Strømsoddbygda, approx. 15 km north of Sokna. The church was designed by architect Oddmund Eindride Slaatto (1896-1963) and was built of lumber in 1953. Strømsoddbygda Chapel is an annex of Lunder Church. Both churched belongs under the Norderhov parish, with Norderhov Church as the main church. These churches all belong to the Diocese of Tunsberg.

== Gallery ==
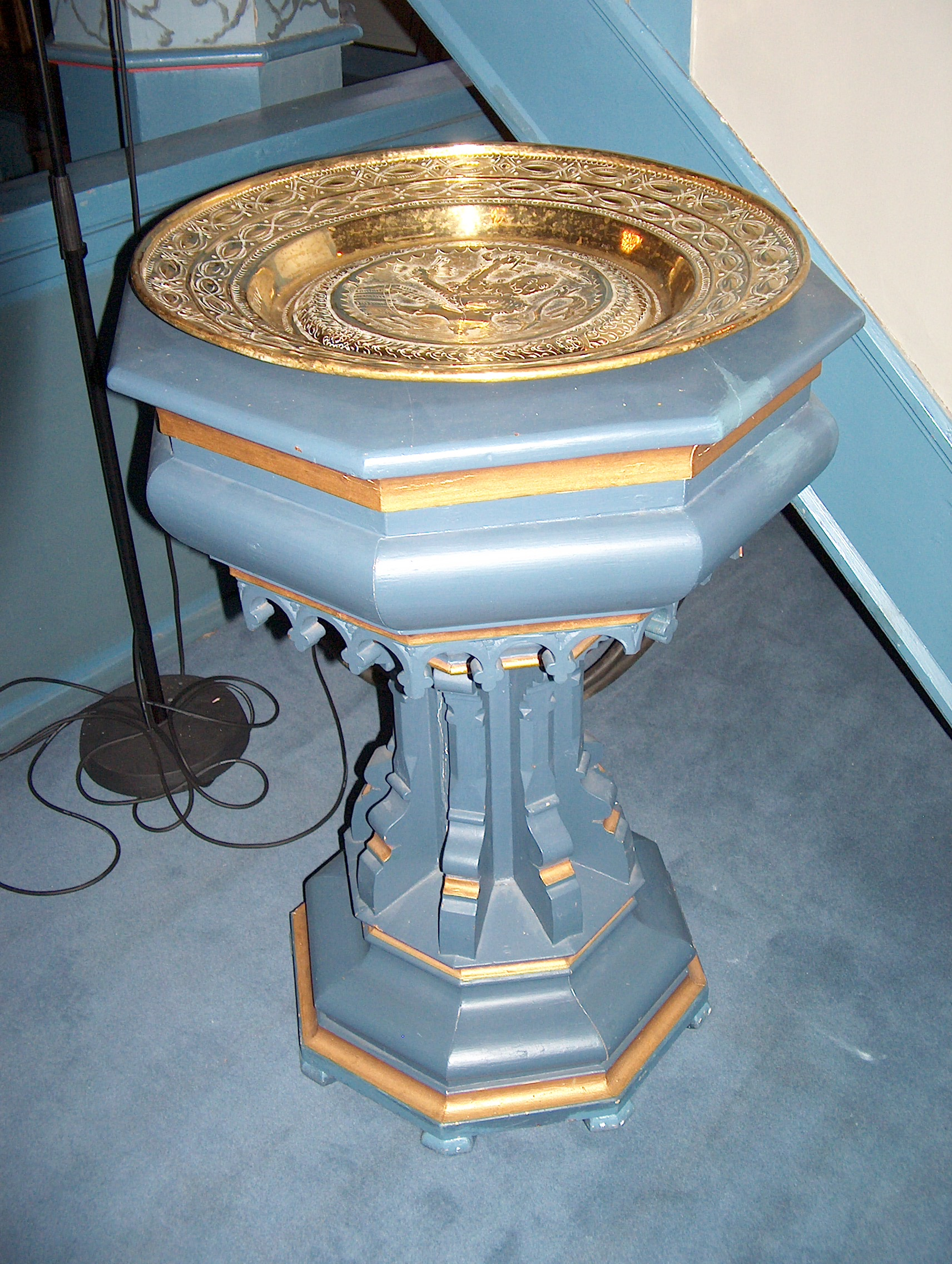
Baptismal font
Lunder Church

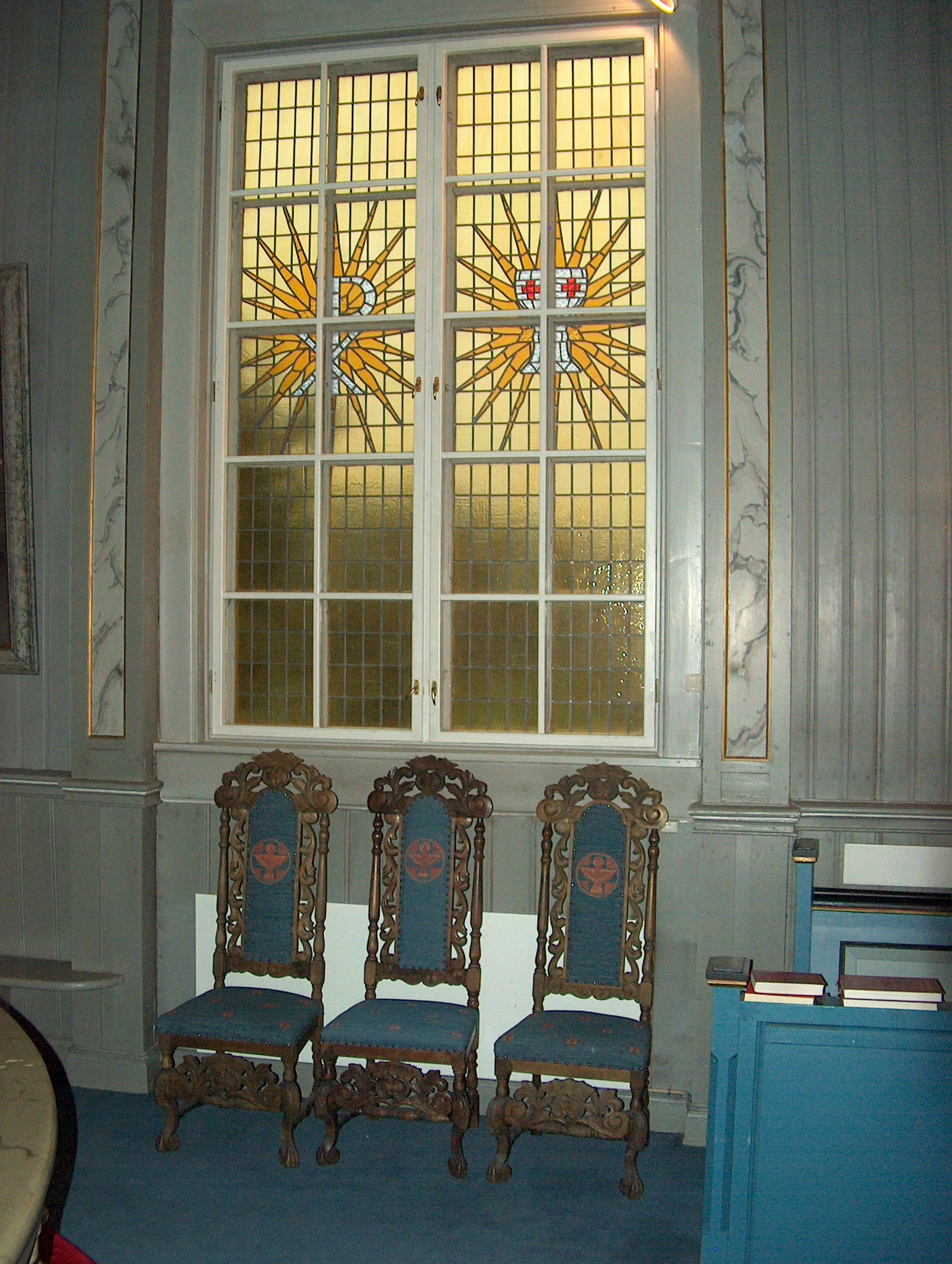
South wall of the choir
Lunder Church

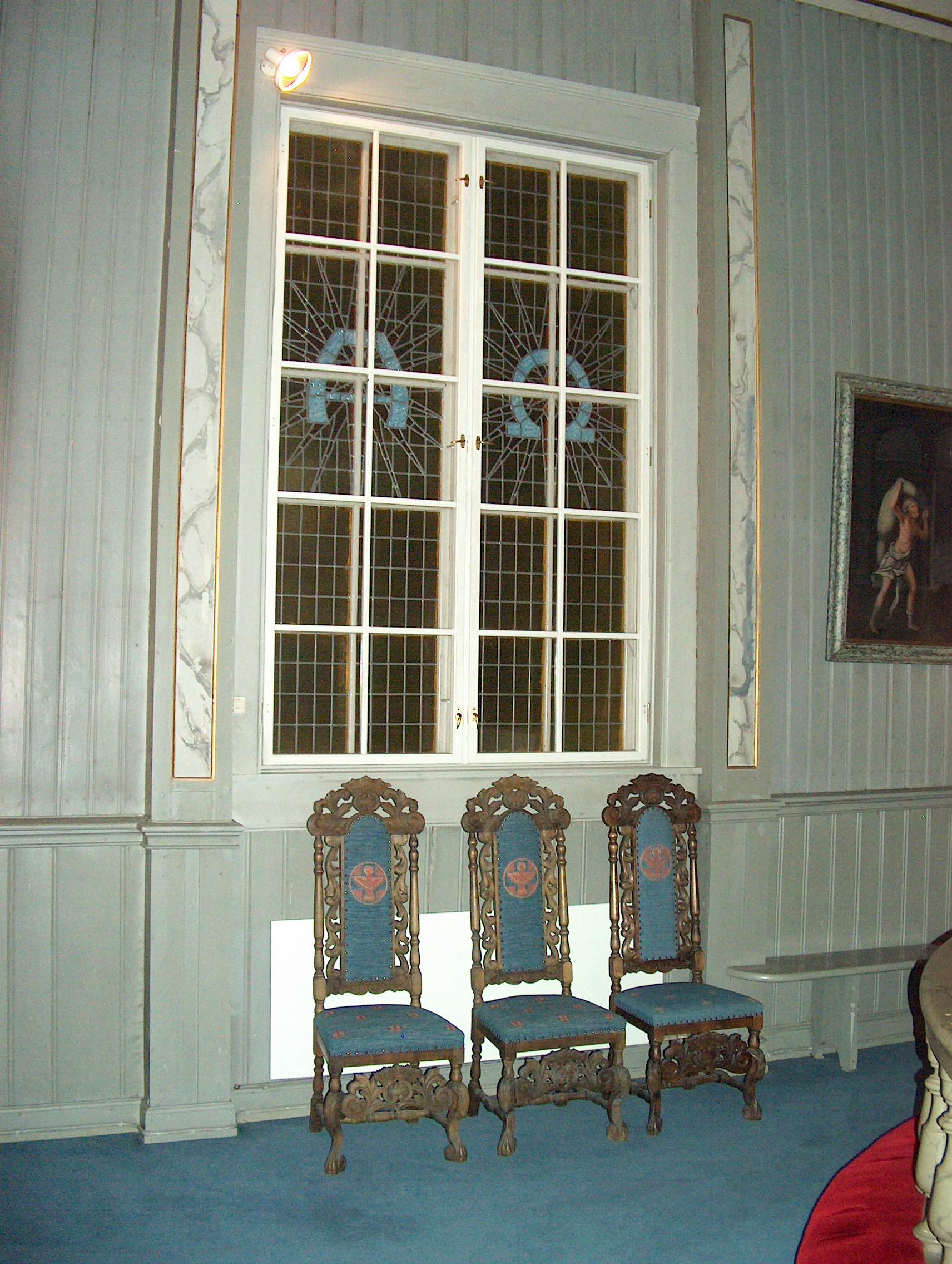
North wall of the choir
Lunder Church

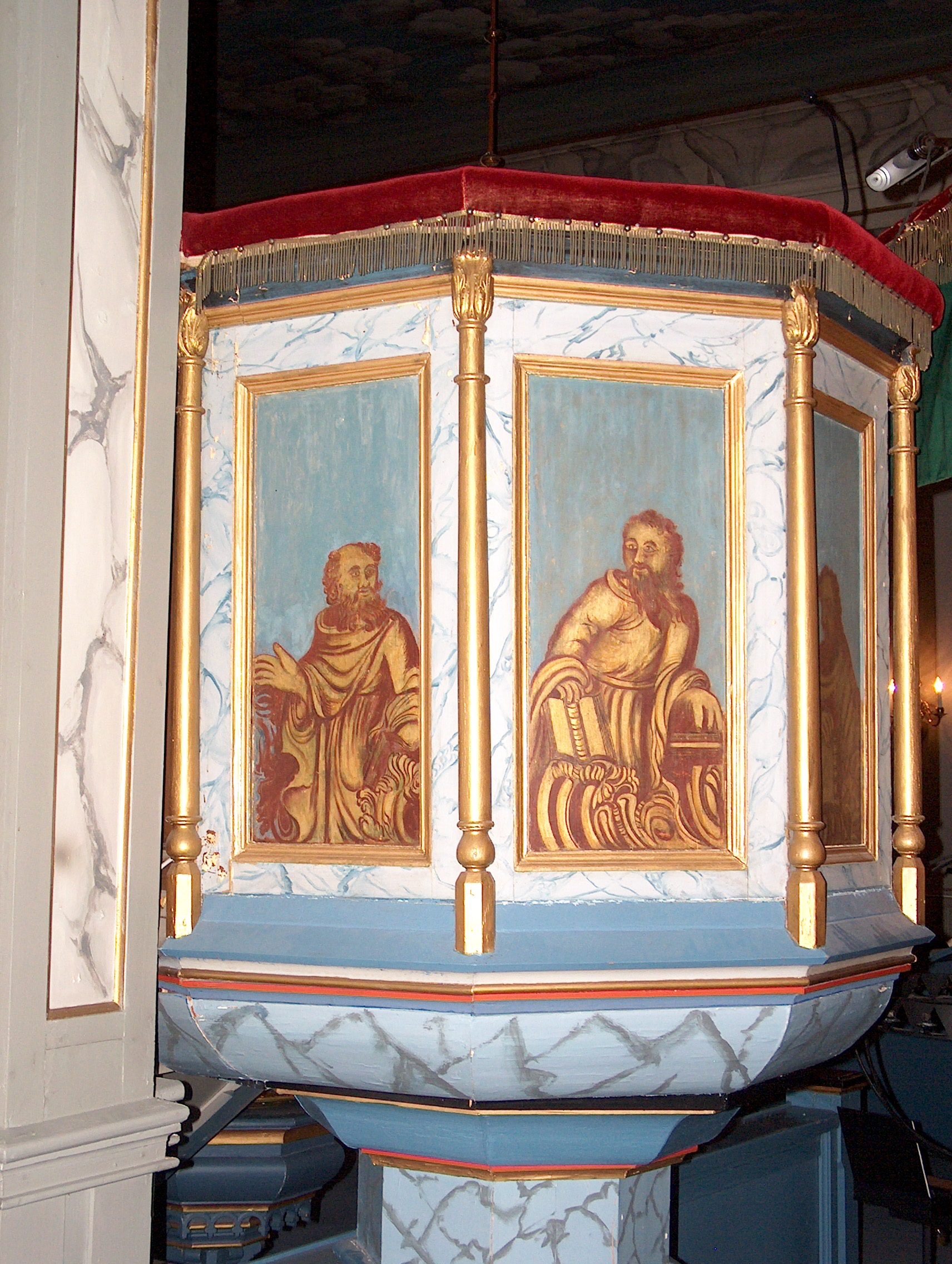
Pulpit
Lunder Church

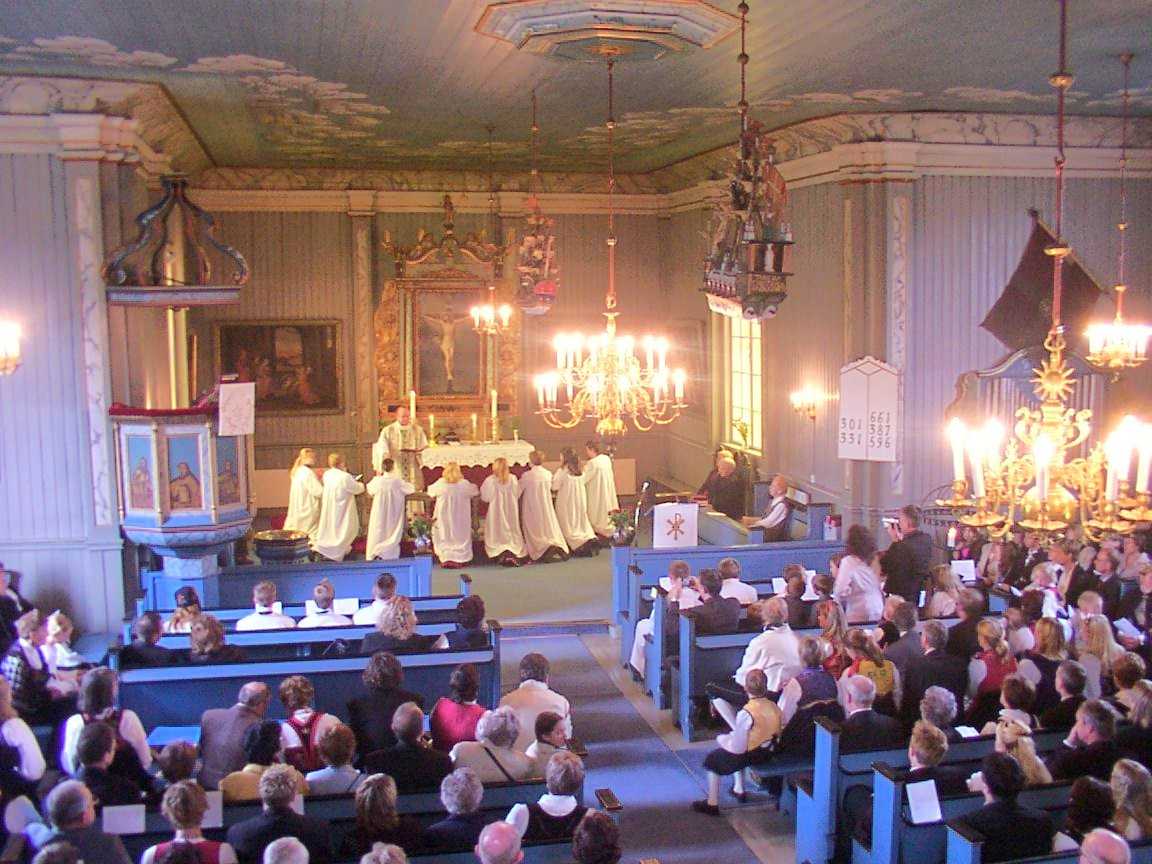
Confirmation at Lunder Church

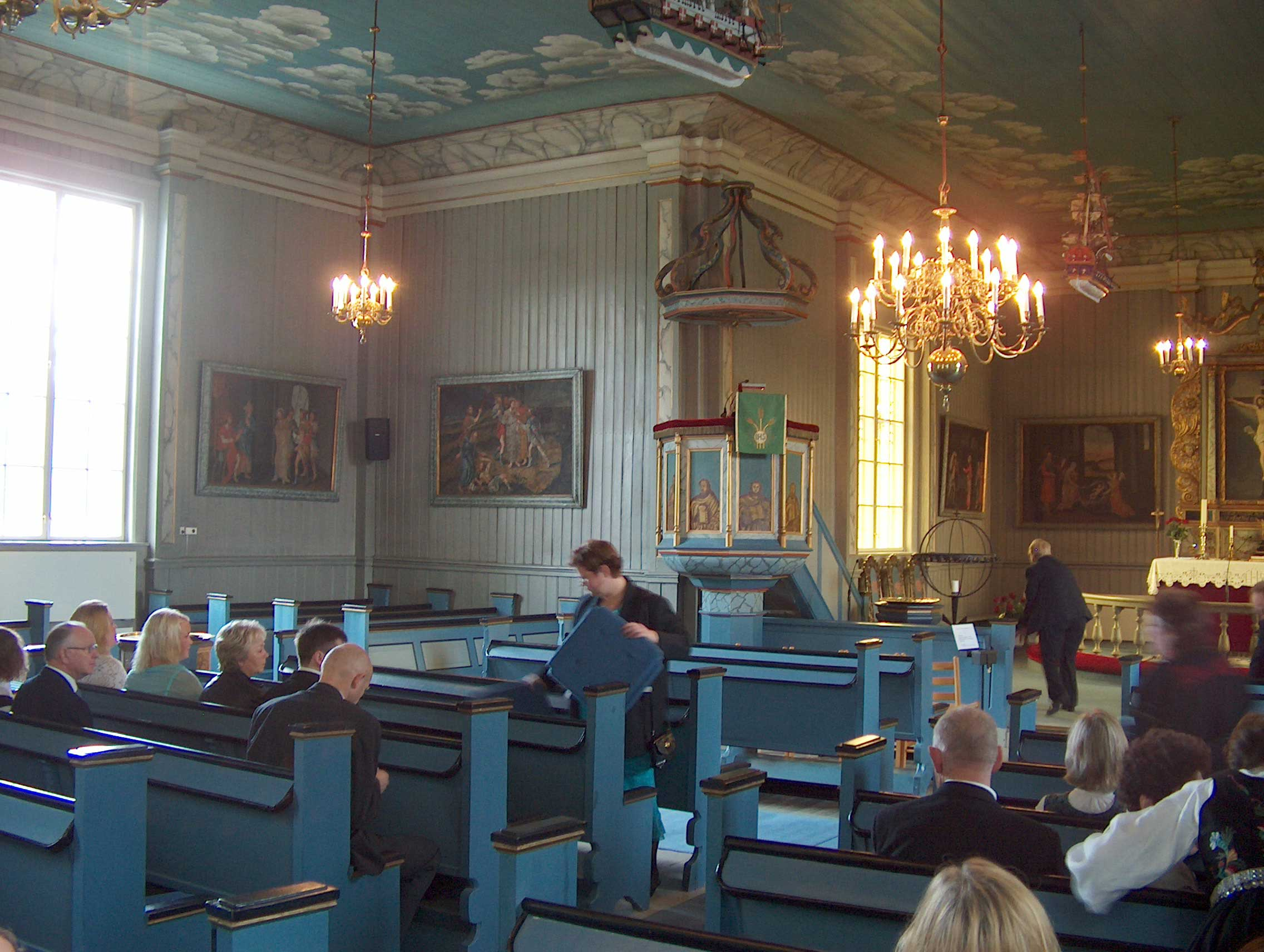
Interior
Lunder Church

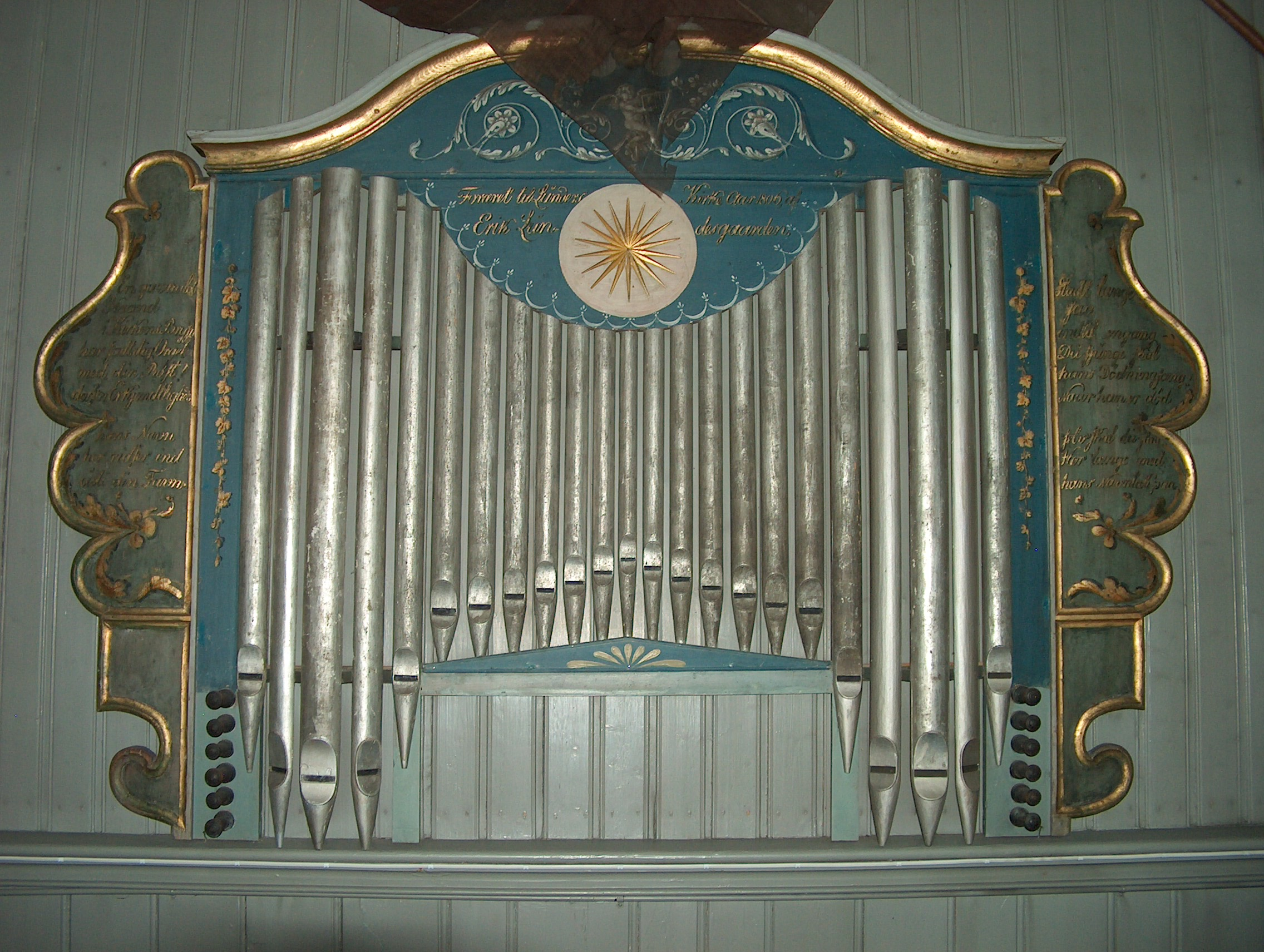
Lunder Church organ

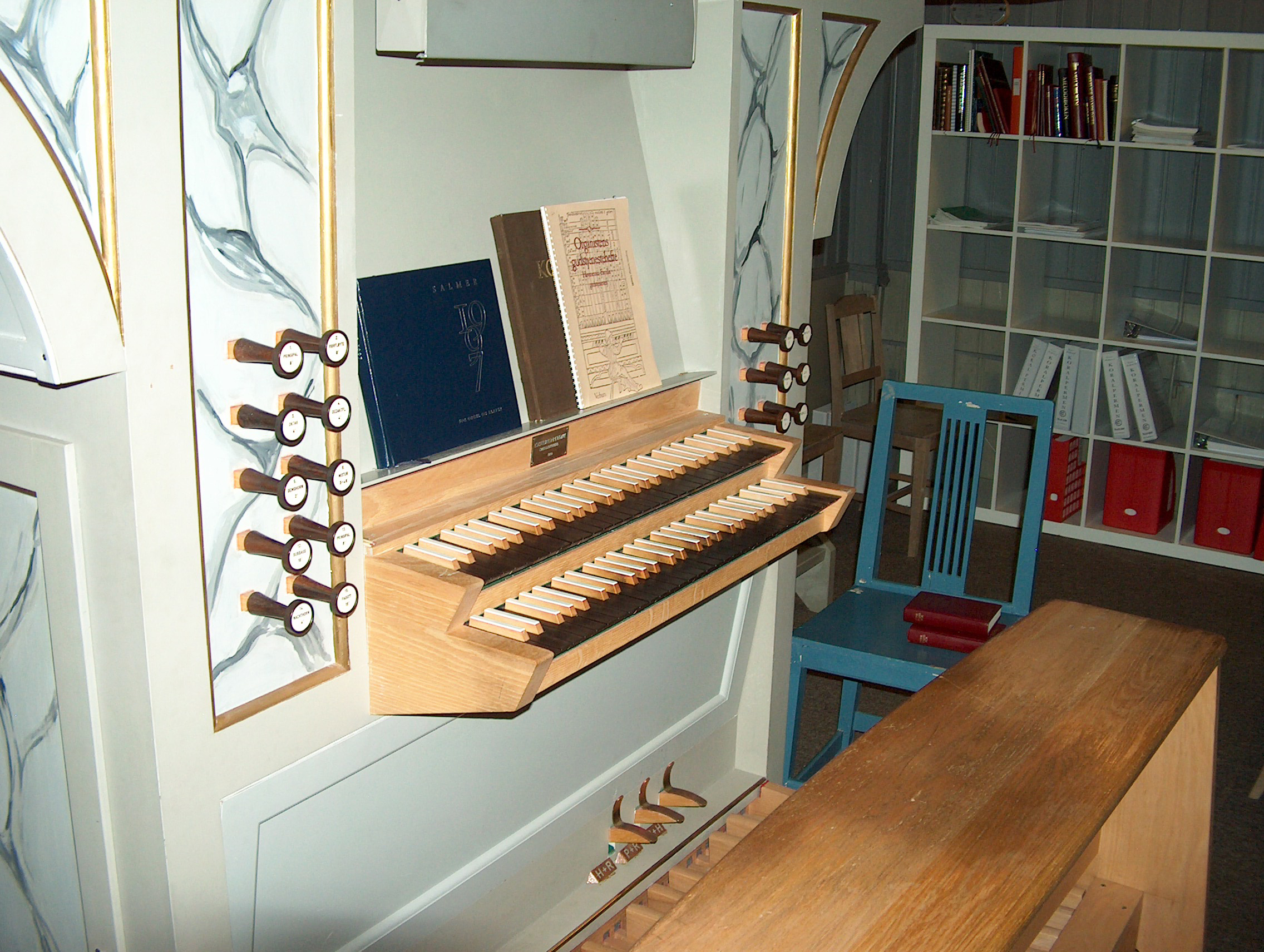
Lunder Church organ

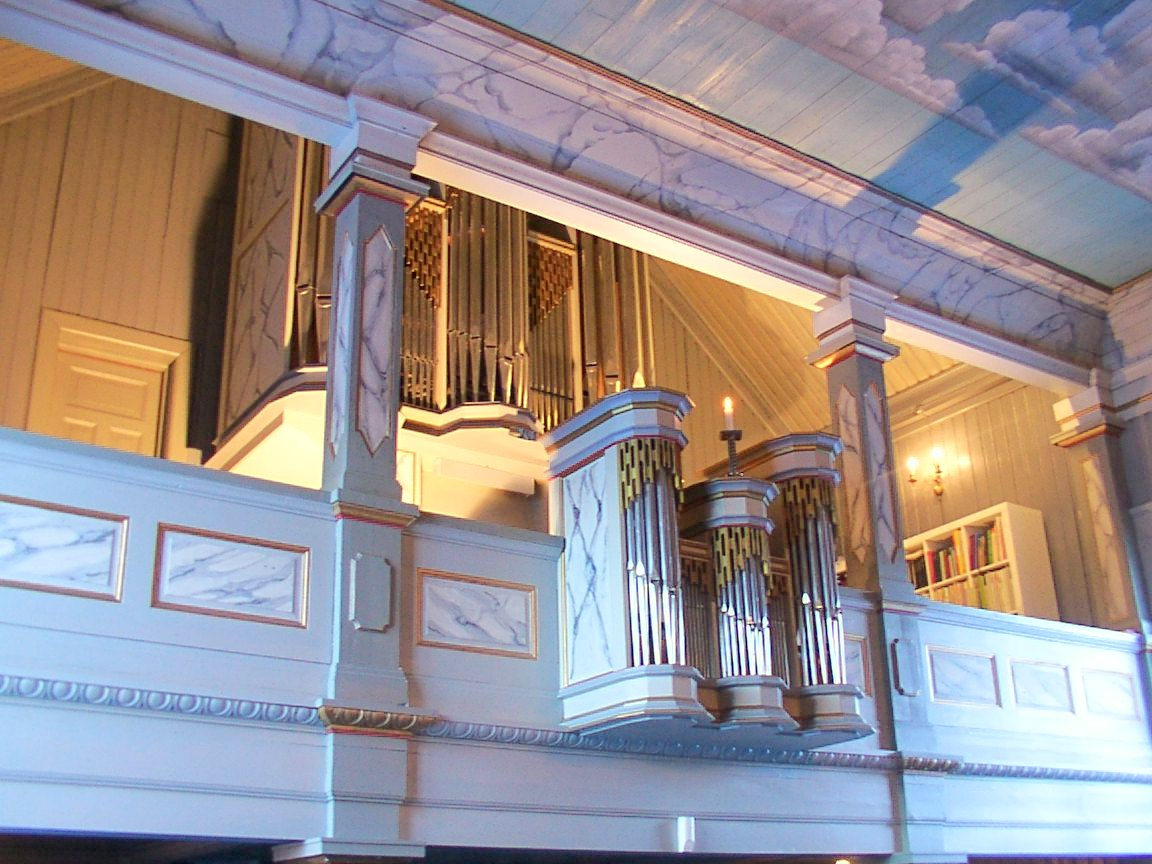
Lunder Church organ loft

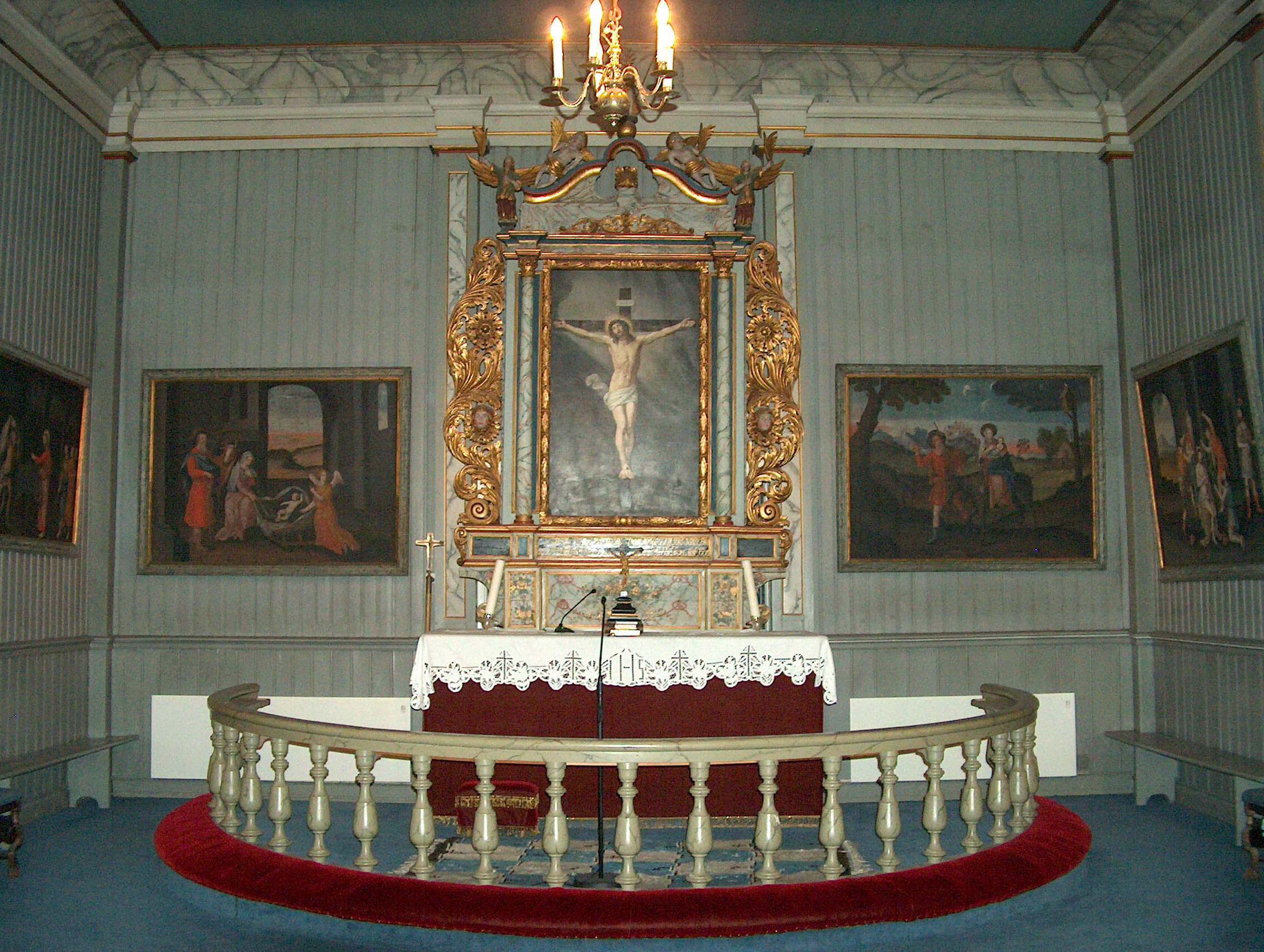
Lunder Church altar
