= Vik, Buskerud =

Village in Buskerud, Norway

Coordinates: 60.077°N 10.281°E

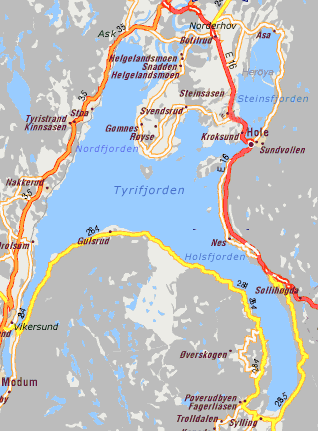
Map of Tyrifjorden with Vik in Hole on E16

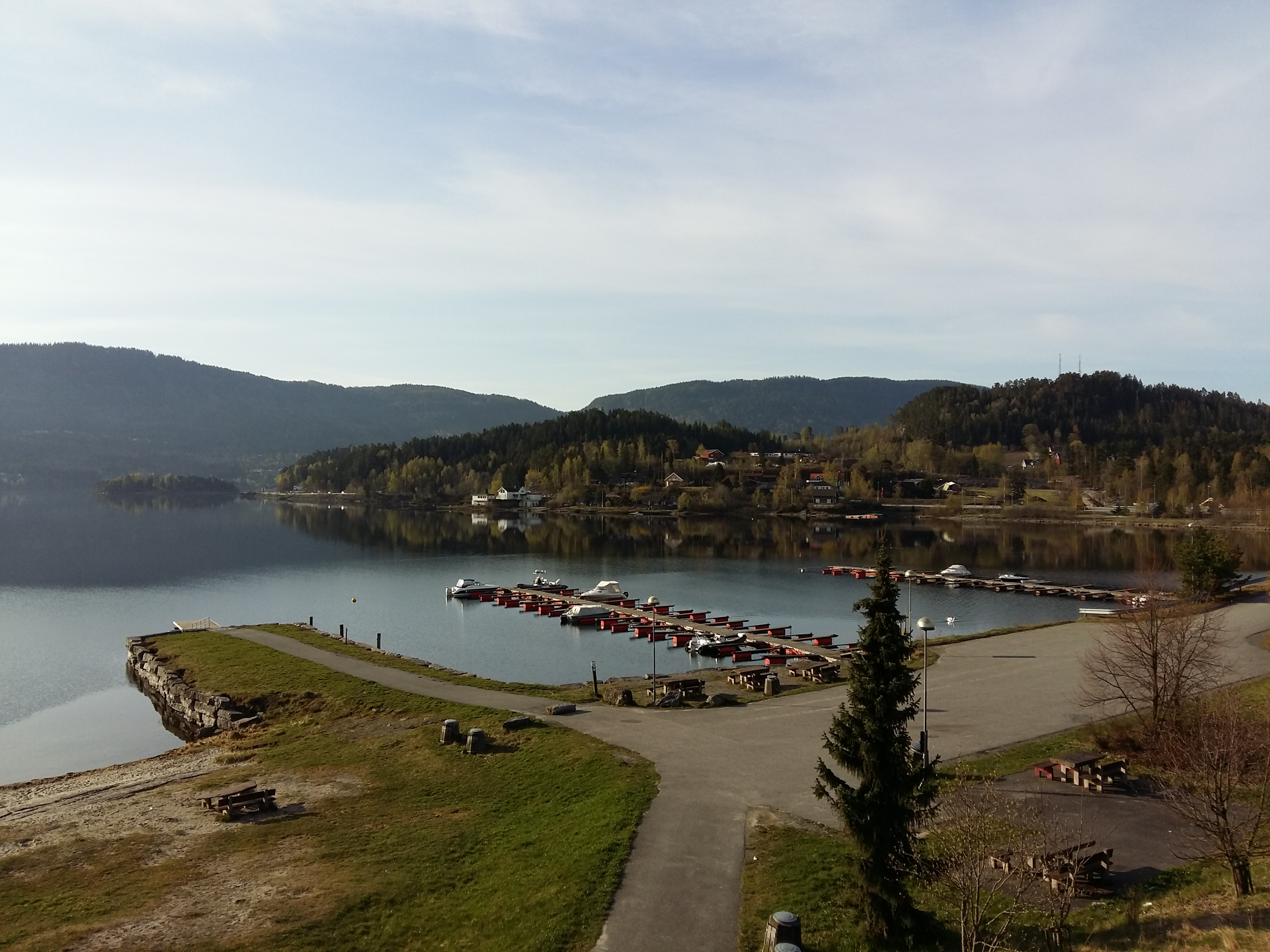
Vik in Hole

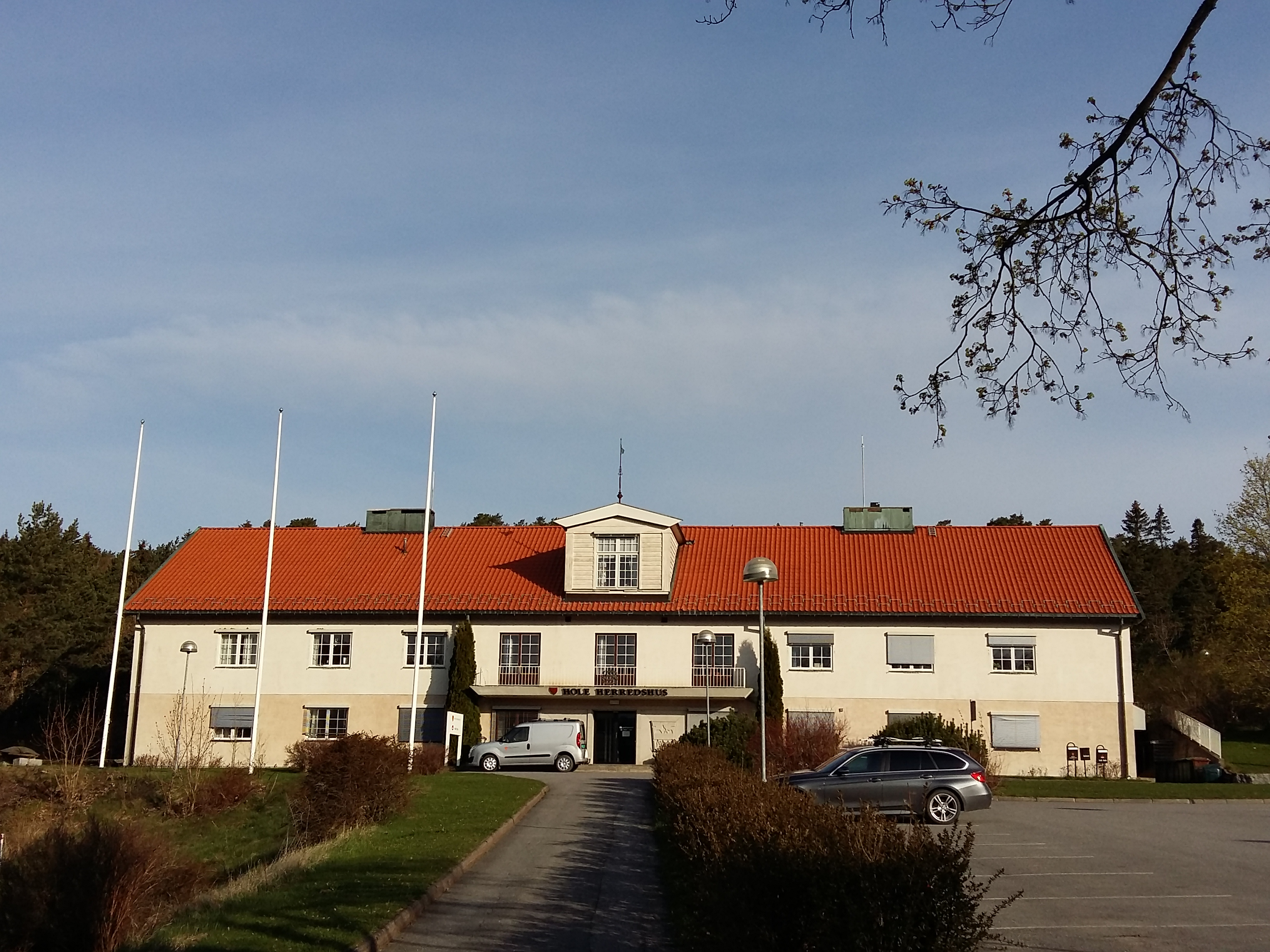
Hole herredshus

Vik is a village and the administrative center of Hole in Buskerud, Norway.

Vik is situated on the northeastern arm of Steinsfjorden, a branch of the Tyrifjorden. It is located on E16 between Sundvollen and Kroksund. The administration buildings for Hole Municipality are located in Vik. The village of Vik was originally named for the Vik farm in an inlet of Steinsfjorden.
