= Steinsåsen =

Village in Hole Municipality, Norway

Coordinates: 60.0967°N 10.285°E

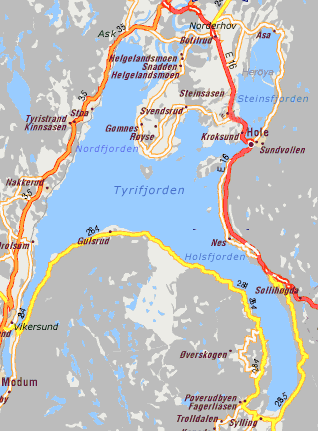
Map of Tyrifjorden with Steinsåsen in Hole on E16

Steinsåsen is a village in Hole municipality in Buskerud, Norway. Steinsåsen located on the west side of Steinsfjorden, the eastern arm of Tyrifjorden. The village is about 9 km southeast of Honefoss. European route E16 passes through Steinsåsen as it travels from Oslo to Bergen.

Steinsåsen is principally a residential area. Its population was 1,909 as of 1 January 2016 which probably includes the village of Vik which is located just south of Steinsåsen.
