= Hole Church =

Church in Buskerud, Norway

- Hole kirke
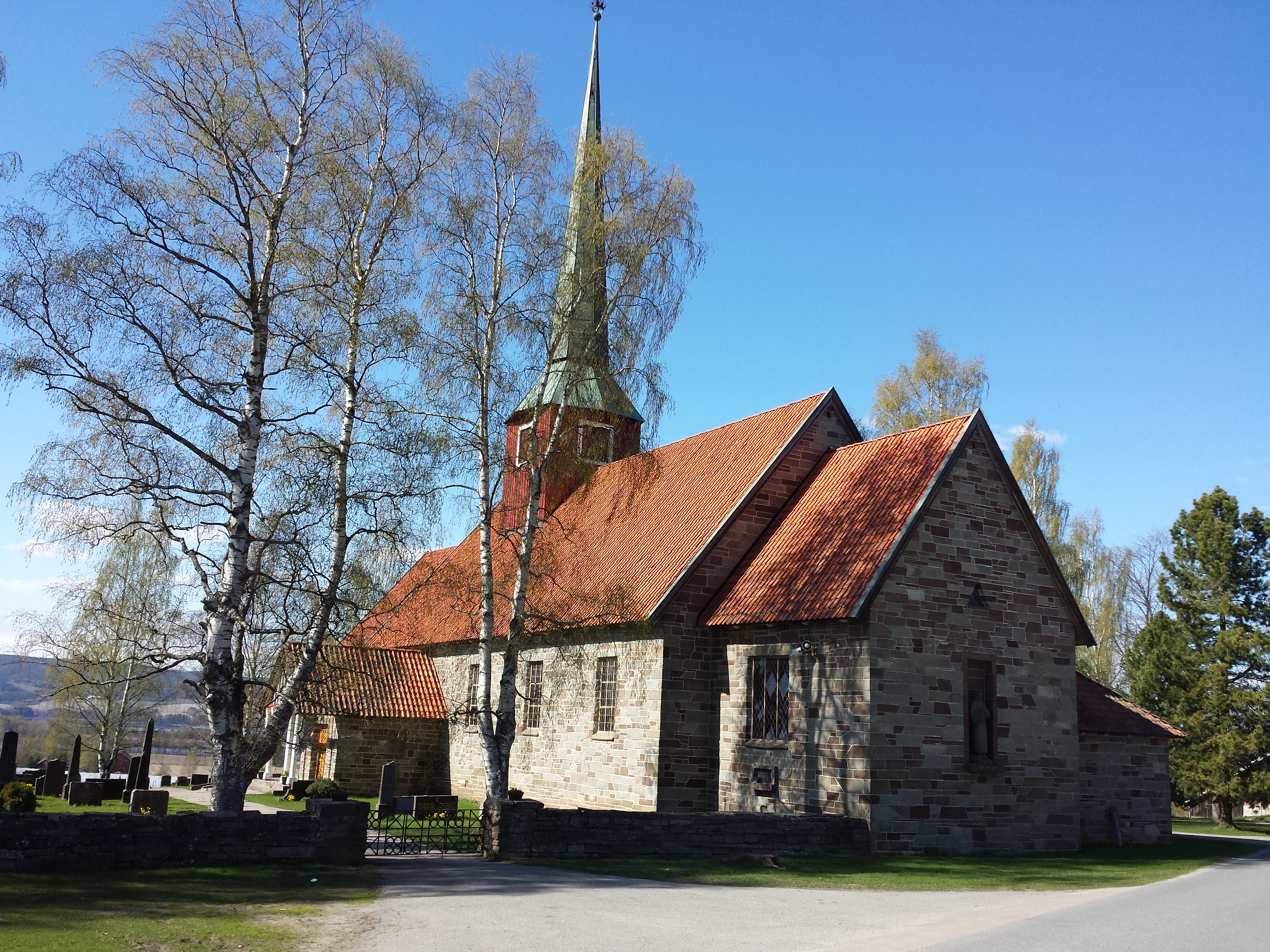
- View of the church
- Hole Church
- 60°05′52″N 10°12′58″E
- Location: Hole, Buskerud
- Country: Norway
- Denomination: Church of Norway
- Previous denomination: Catholic Church
- Churchmanship: Evangelical Lutheran

History
- Status: Parish church
- Founded: 12th century
- Consecrated: c. 1200
- Events: Fire: 1943; Rebuilt: 1954

Architecture
- Functional status: Active
- Architectural type: Long church
- Completed: c. 1200 (826 years ago)

Specifications
- Capacity: 350
- Materials: Stone

Administration
- Diocese: Tunsberg
- Deanery: Ringerike prosti
- Parish: Hole
- Norwegian Cultural Heritage Site
- Type: Church
- Status: Automatically protected
- ID: 84597

Hole Church (Norwegian: Hole kirke) is a parish church of the Church of Norway in Hole Municipality in Buskerud county, Norway. It is located in the village of Helgelandsmoen. It is one of the churches for the Hole parish which is part of the Ringerike prosti (deanery) in the Diocese of Tunsberg. The stone church was built in a long church design around the year 1200. The church was almost completed rebuilt in 1954 after a major fire in 1943. The church seats about 350 people.

== History ==
The earliest existing historical records of the church date back to the year 1330, but the church was not built that year. The Romanesque stone church was likely built between the years 1150–1200. It had a rectangular nave that measured about 7 by 6 metres (23 ft × 20 ft) and a narrower, rectangular chancel that measured about 3 by 4 metres (9.8 ft × 13.1 ft). In the late 17th century, a tower was added to the west end of the building and a sacristy to the north side of the chancel.

In 1660, the church was enlarged by adding a wooden extension to the nave on the west end of the building measuring about 7 by 5.65 metres (23.0 ft × 18.5 ft). A sacristy was built on the north side of the choir in 1696. The church, like most other churches in Norway, was sold into private ownership during the Norwegian church sale in 1723 to help the King pay off war debts. This church was purchased by Anthon Schøyendahl. In 1736–1737, the wooden section that was added in the 1600s was torn down along with the chancel and sacristy. The church was then enlarged by adding three wooden transepts (log construction) to create a cruciform design with a new chancel in the eastern transept with a small sacristy to the east of the chancel. In 1754, Ivar Wiel, the local bailiff purchased the church and donated it to the local residents.

In 1814, this church served as an election church (Norwegian: valgkirke). Together with more than 300 other parish churches across Norway, it was a polling station for elections to the 1814 Norwegian Constituent Assembly which wrote the Constitution of Norway. This was Norway's first national election. Each church parish was a constituency that elected people called "electors" who later met together in each county to elect the representatives for the assembly that was to meet at Eidsvoll Manor later that year.

=== Fire ===
On 24 May 1943 lightning struck the church and it burned down. Only a few exterior stone walls remained after the fire. The altarpiece and the baptismal font were both saved from the fire as well. The old remaining walls were covered up and protected, but nothing was done to fix it until after World War II ended and the German occupation of Norway was over. In 1950, the architect Finn Bryn was hired to rebuild the ancient church. The remaining stone walls were incorporated into the new building design and they now form a small chapel on the western end of the building. The newly rebuilt church was re-consecrated on 5 September 1954. The new portions of the building are made out of sandstone in a long church design with a rectangular nave, a choir in the east, and a sacristy north of the choir.

== Media gallery ==
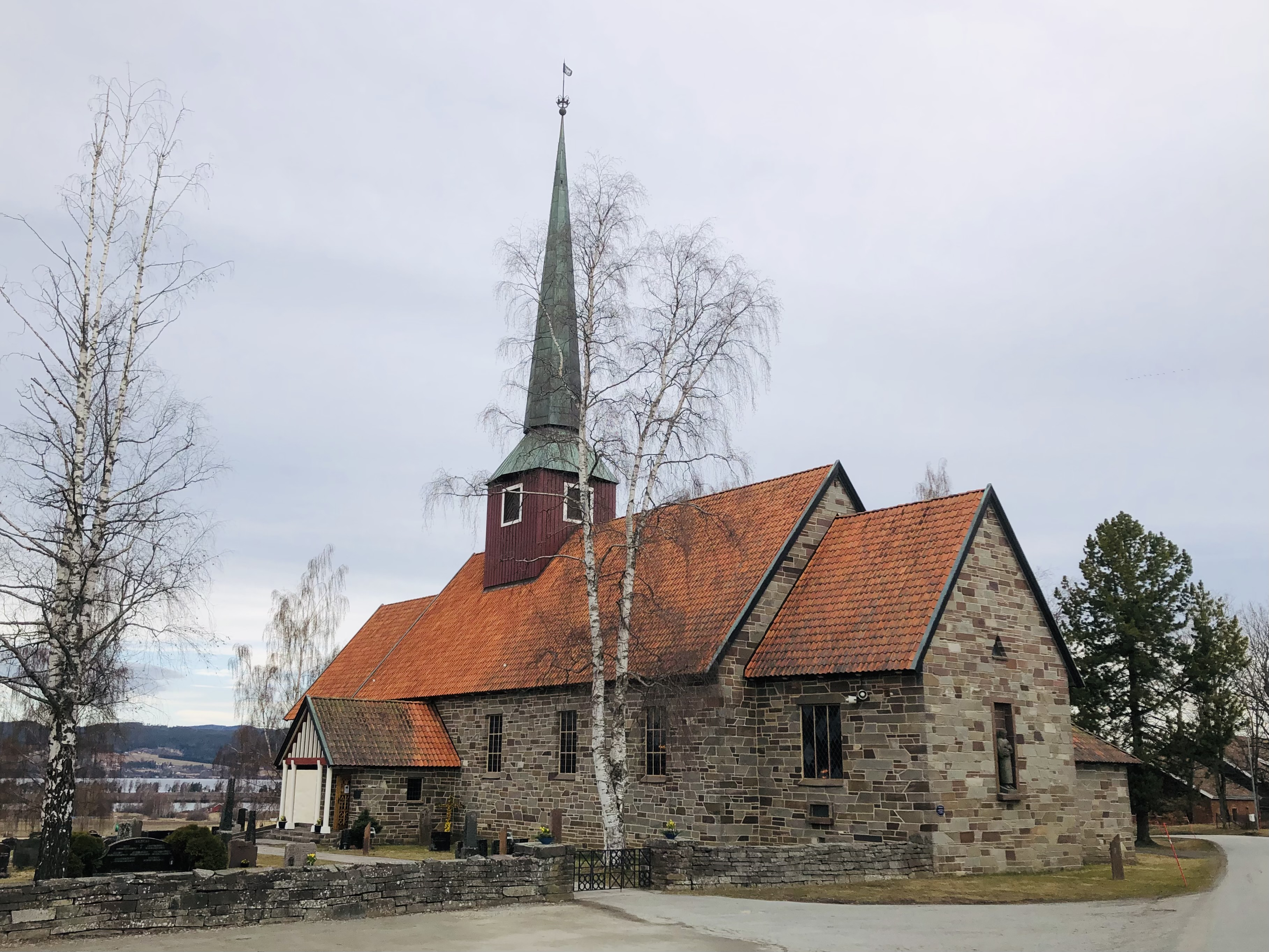

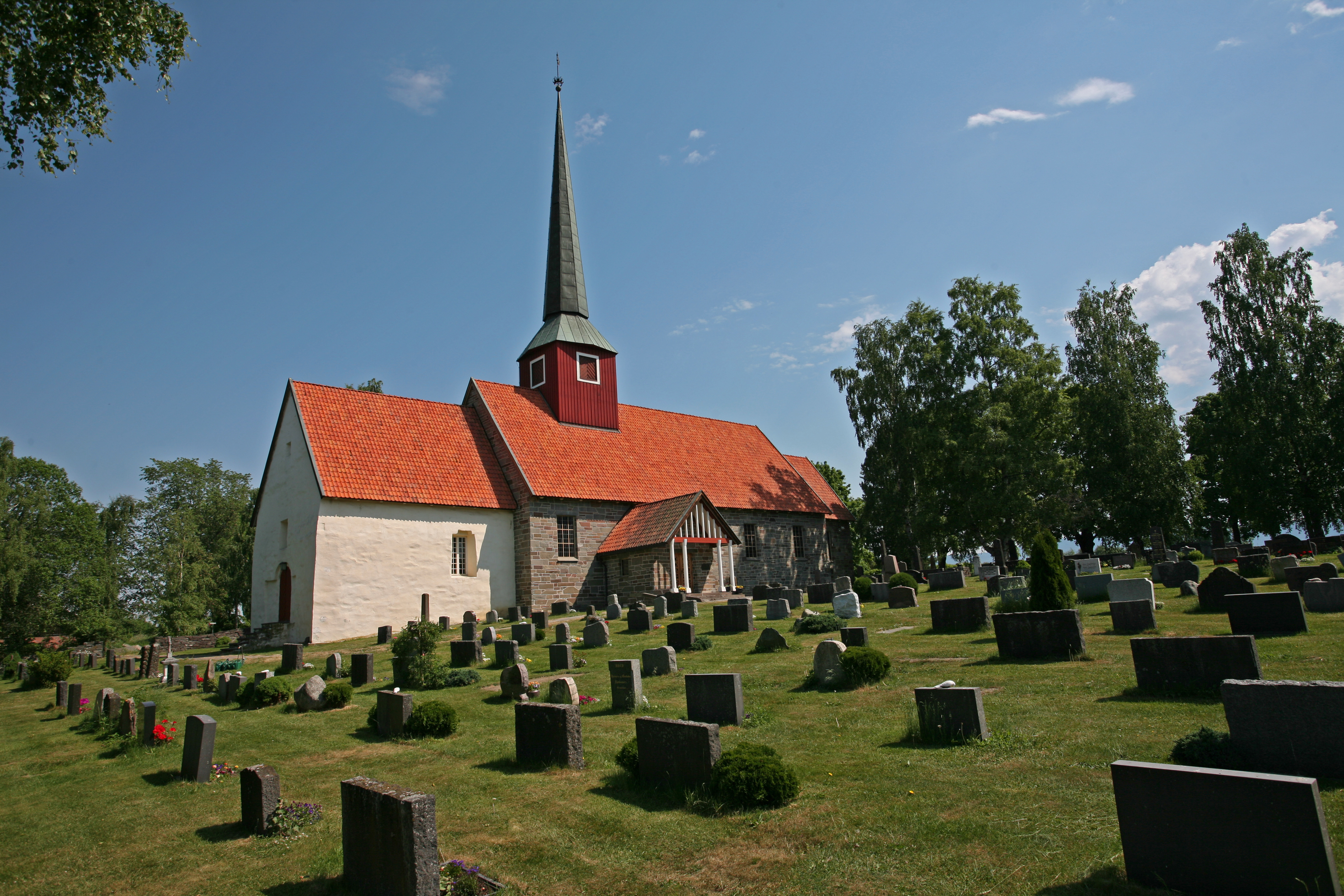

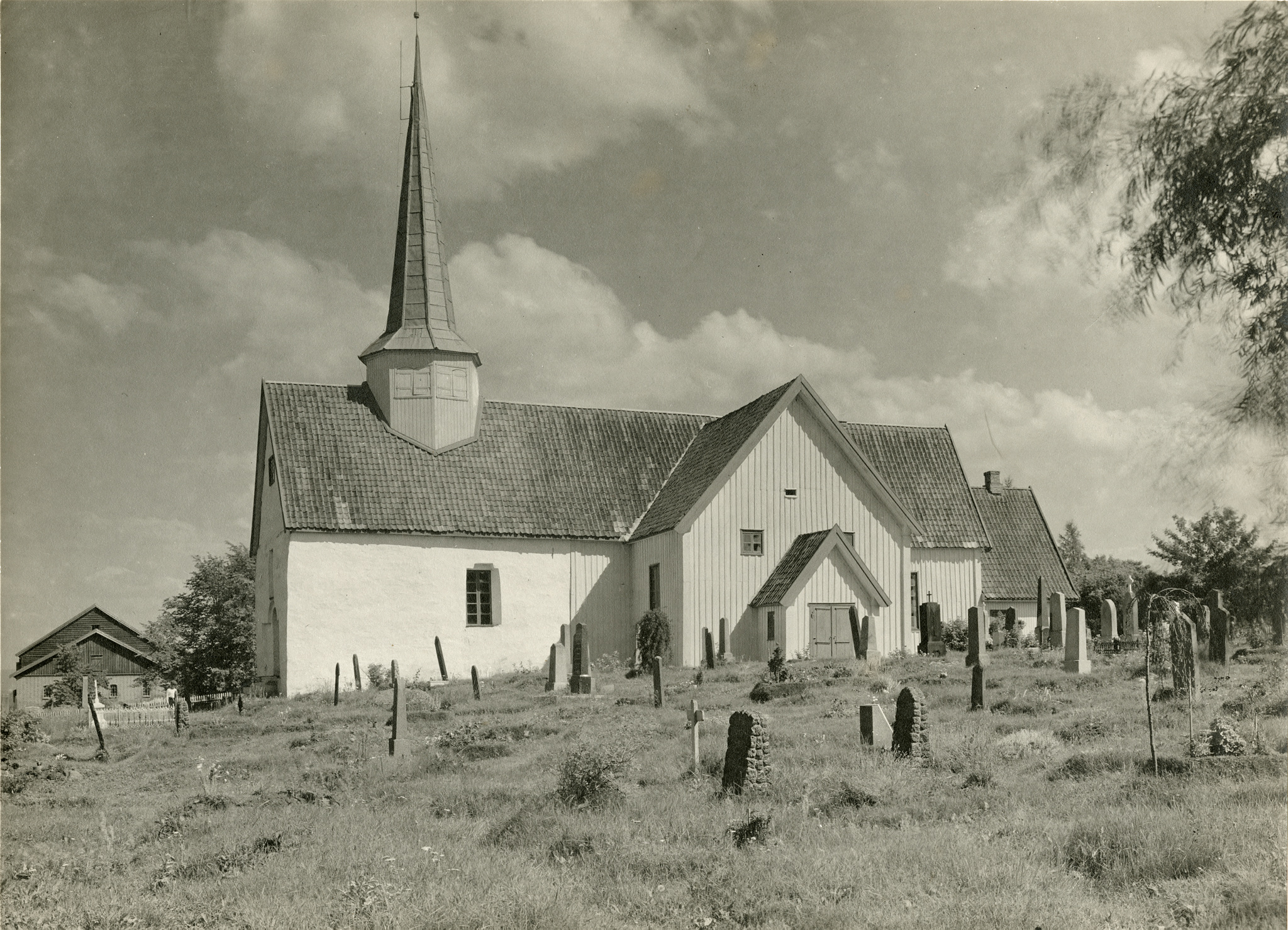

== See also ==
- List of churches in Tunsberg
