= Utvika Camping =

Camping spot in Norway

Coordinates: 60°1′43.52″N 10°15′43.83″E

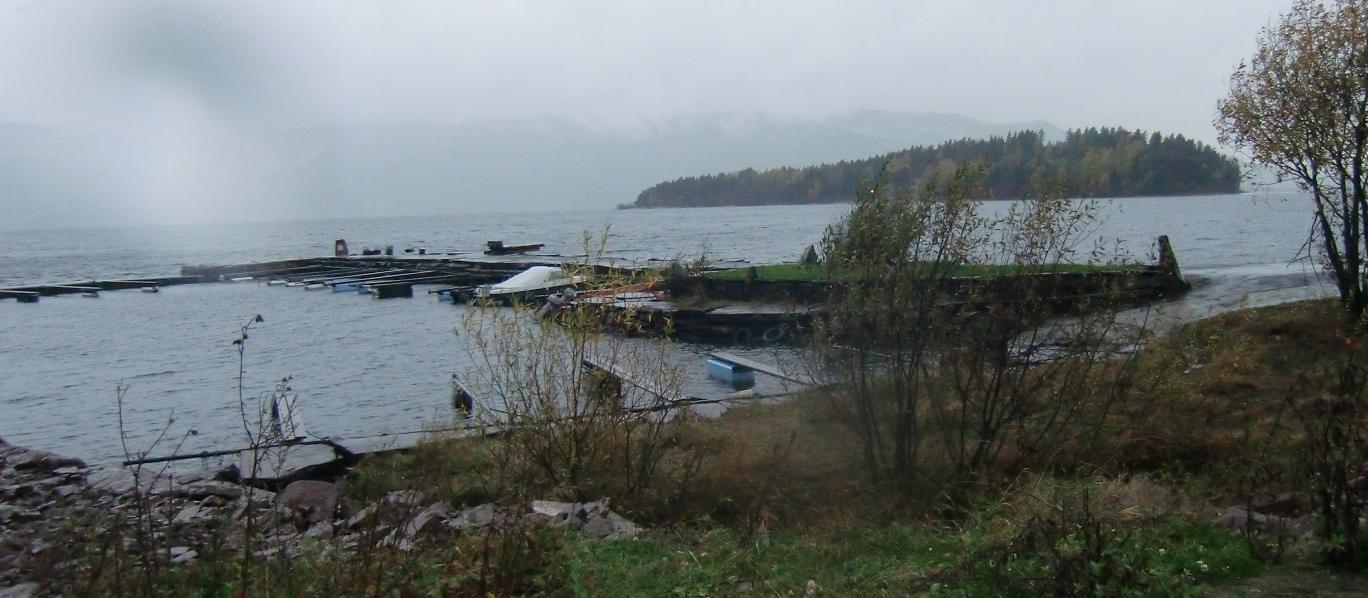
Utvika Camping pier

Utvika Camping is a camping spot close to the Tyrifjorden. Perhaps mostly known as the place where most of the survivors of the 2011 Norway attacks at Utøya were taken when rescued by boat owners in the area.
