= Utøykaia =

Ferry landing in Norway

Coordinates: 60°1′22.9832″N 10°15′46.3972″E

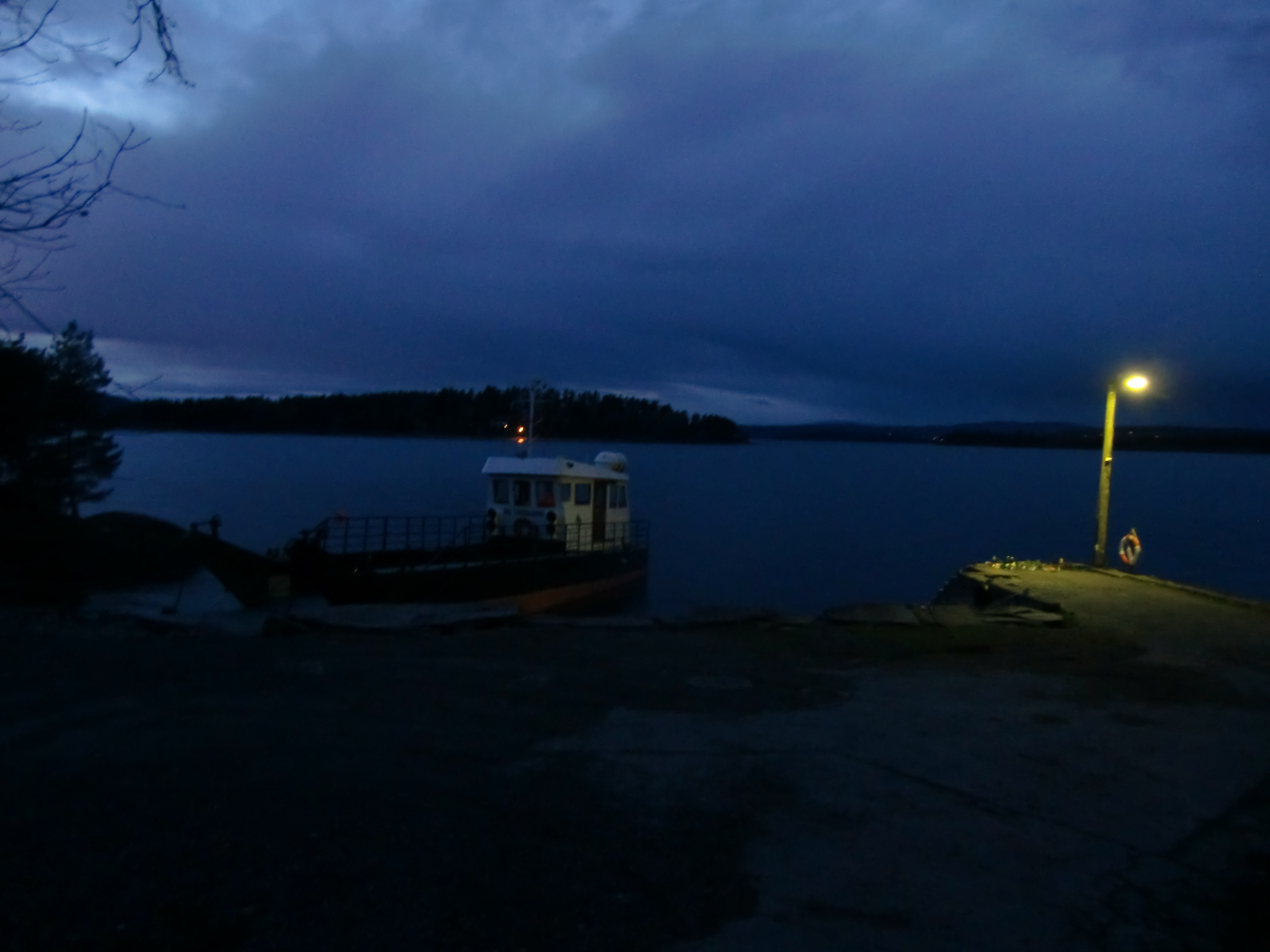
MS Thorbjørn at Utøykaia

Utøykaia or Utøya-kaia, also called «Thorbjørnkaia», is a ferry landing in Tyrifjorden. The ferry landing on the main land is located approximately 600 metres (2,000 ft) from the ferry landing at Utøya. The pier is located about 450 meters south of the pier at Utvika Camping. The sign "Utøya" on the main road points to Utøykaia.

MS Thorbjørn is normally moored at the pier. During the Labour Youth League's annual summer camp, the vessel shuttles between Utøya and Utøykaia.

It was from here Anders Behring Breivik, dressed in a fake police uniform, boarded the MS Thorbjørn to be ferried to the island of Utøya during the 2011 Norway attacks.

== Gallery ==
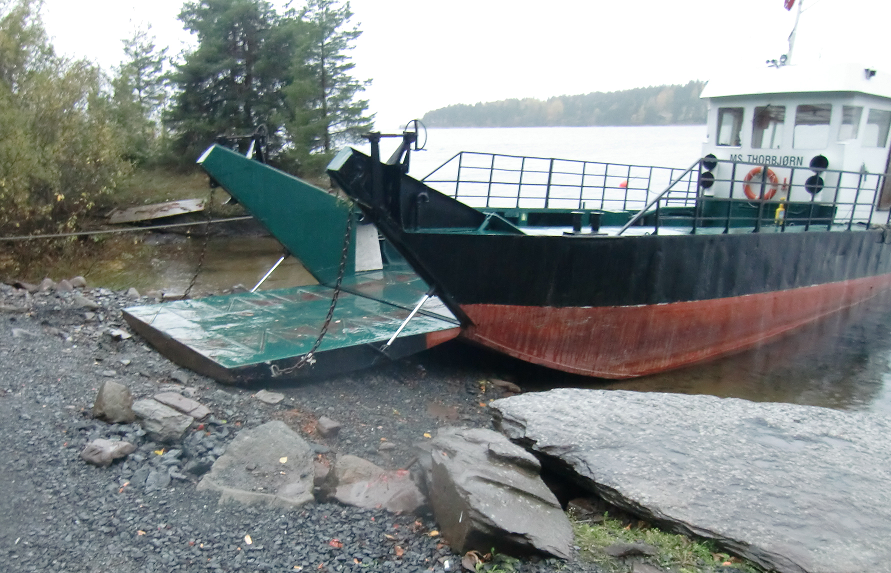
MS Thorbjørn

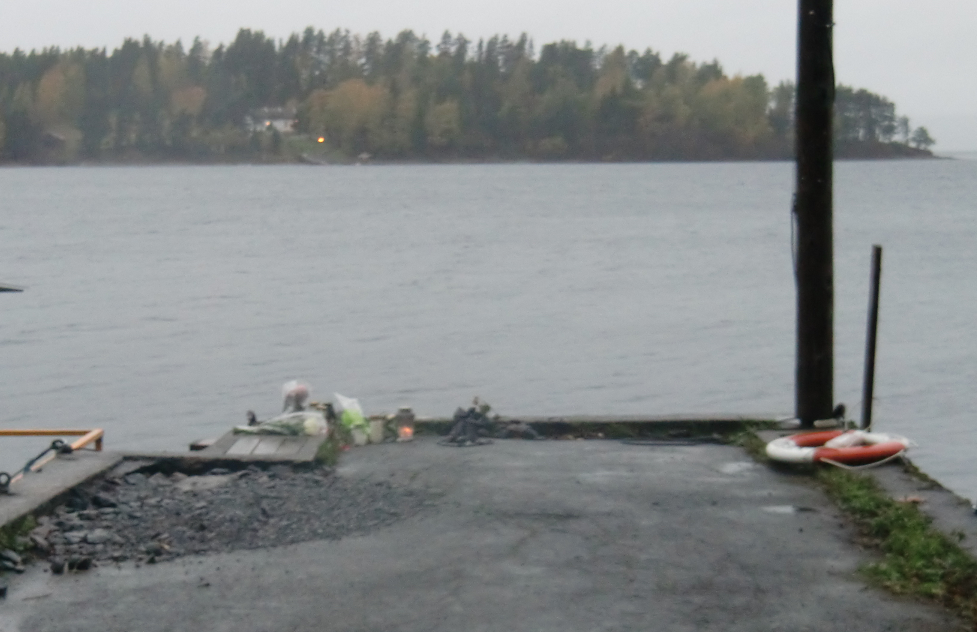
Utøykaia. Utøya in the background
