= L50 =

L50 may refer to:

- N50, L50, and related statistics, used in genome assembly
- HMS Rochester (L50), Royal Navy ship
- Daihatsu New Line#First generation (L50), |Daihatsu compact truck model
- British L-class submarine#Group 3 (L50-class), British submarine class
- Suzuki Carry#Fifth generation (L50/60), Suzuki van
- Landing Craft L-50, Swedish Navy landing craft
- Honduran lempira, Honduran banknote
- Suzuki FB series engine#L50, Suzuki FB series engine model
- HMAS Tobruk (L 50), Royal Australian Navy ship
- Kavango – Southwest Bantu languages, Bantu language
- List of Toyota transmissions, Toyota transmission
