= Morten Ludvig Sundt =

Norwegian politician

Morten Ludvig Sundt (6 April 1809 – 1 June 1891) was a Norwegian farmer and politician.

He was the mayor of Hole from 1850 to 1866. He was elected to the Parliament of Norway in 1851, representing the rural constituency of Buskeruds Amt. He was re-elected in 1854, 1857, 1859, 1862 and 1865. He owned the farm By Søndre in Hole and is credited for his role in the development of the Ringerike potato (Ringerikspotet).
