= Steinsfjorden =

Coordinates: 60°05′34″N 10°19′22″E

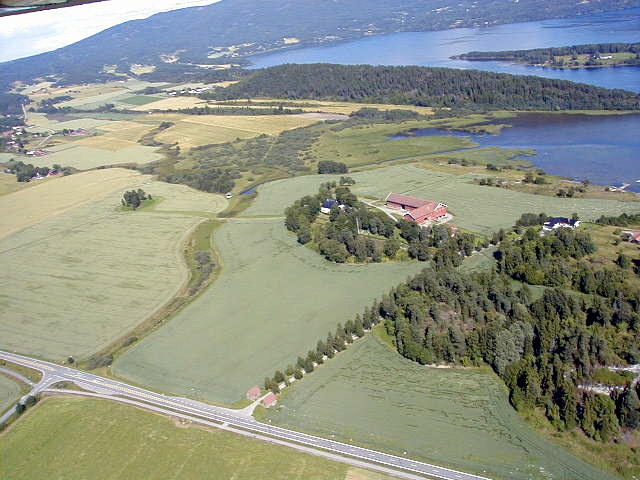
Stein Gård and Steinsfjorden

Steinsfjorden is a branch of the lake Tyrifjorden located in Buskerud, Norway. It has a length of about eight kilometers, stretching from the sound Kroksund at Sundvollen northwards to Åsa, in the municipalities of Ringerike and Hole. At the eastern side are steep cliffs towards Krokskogen.

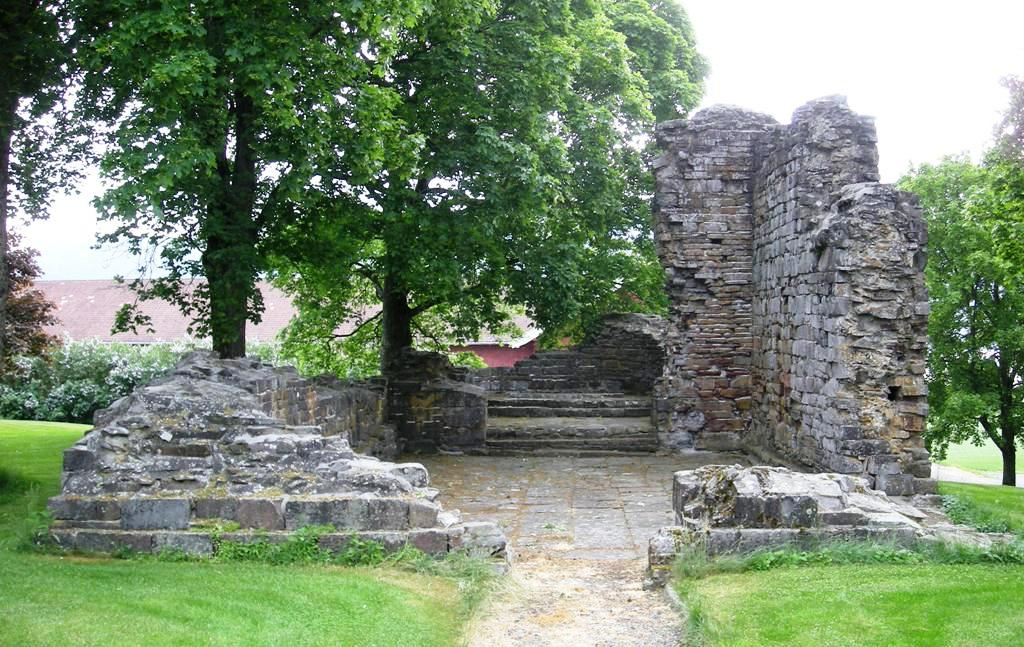
Ruins of Stein Church

At the western side of Steinsfjorden is Stein Gård, the largest farm in Buskerud. The ruins of Stein Church (Stein kirkeruin) are located on Stein Gård. The church was constructed during the latter half of the 1100s of sandstone and limestone from the area. By the second half of the 1500s, the church was no longer actively used.
