= MS Thorbjørn =

Norwegian ferry

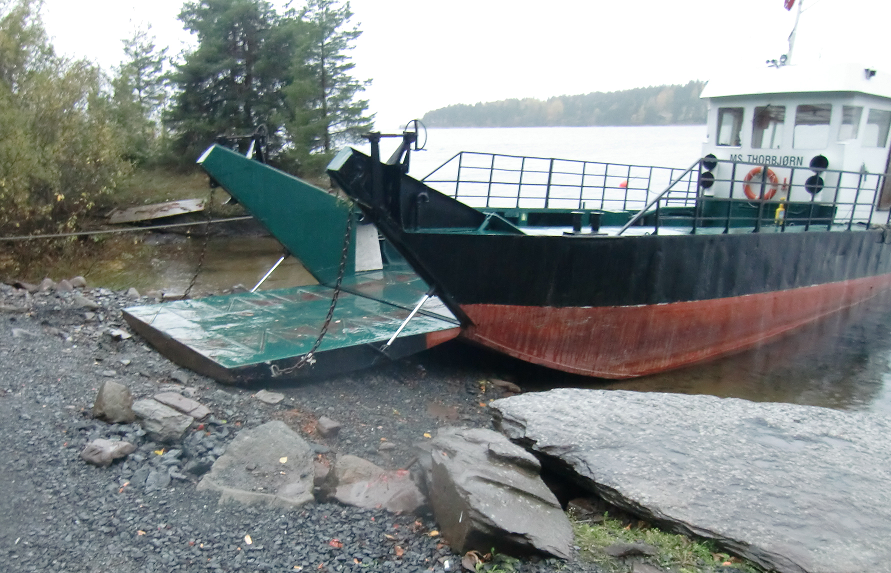
- MS Thorbjørn at the ferry landing

History
- Name: Thorbjørn
- Namesake: Thorbjørn Jagland
- Owner: AUF
- Port of registry: Norway
- Ordered: 1948
- Builder: Oskarshamn Shipyard

General characteristics
- Class & type: Rebuilt L50 landing craft
- Displacement: 31 ton
- Length: 17.18 m (56.4 ft)
- Beam: 4.8 m (16 ft)
- Depth: 1.15 m (3.8 ft)
- Capacity: 50 passengers
- Crew: 2

MS Thorbjørn (call sign LILU) is a vessel owned by AUF. During AUF's annual summer camp on the island of Utøya, the vessel shuttles the participants between Utøya and Utøykaia on the mainland. The vessel was built at Oskarshamn Shipyard in 1948. It was previously called Rasmus and was bought by AUF in 1997 for SEK 250,000 (approx. US$37,000 in April 1997). It was later renamed Thorbjørn after Thorbjørn Jagland, a former AUF leader who later became Prime Minister of Norway. The ferry is certified for 50 passengers and can carry small vehicles.

== History ==
Before the vessel was converted into a civilian passenger ferry, it was a military landing craft of the L-50-type. These landing crafts were used by the Swedish Navy and the Swedish Coastal Artillery from the 1950s to the 1980s. The L50-boats were used by Coastal Rangers for fast landing of personnel under fire.

=== 2011 Norway attacks ===
In July 2011 MS Thorbjørn was used by Anders Behring Breivik to reach Utøya before his attack on the AUF summer camp. A few minutes after the first shots were fired, the vessel left the island with only nine people on board. Fearing that there might be more terrorists in the area, they took the ferry 2.7 kilometres (1.5 nmi; 1.7 mi) north to Skoglund. Hence the ferry was not available to the police when they arrived at Utøykaia, the normal ferry landing on mainland.

The vessel was used in the rescue work shortly after the shooter was arrested. The captain of the ferry, Jon Olson, was transporting the police and rescue workers to Utøya and campers from Utøya to the mainland throughout the night.

== Gallery ==
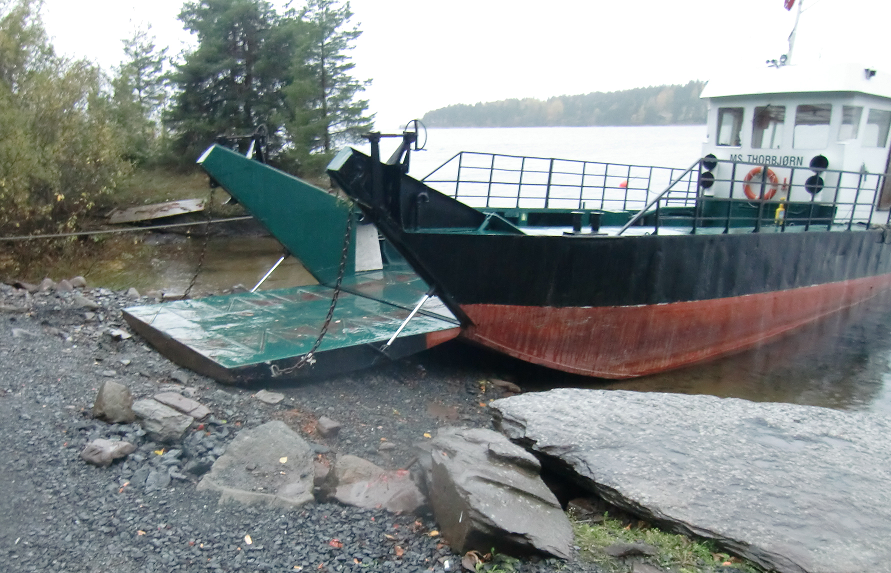
Port side

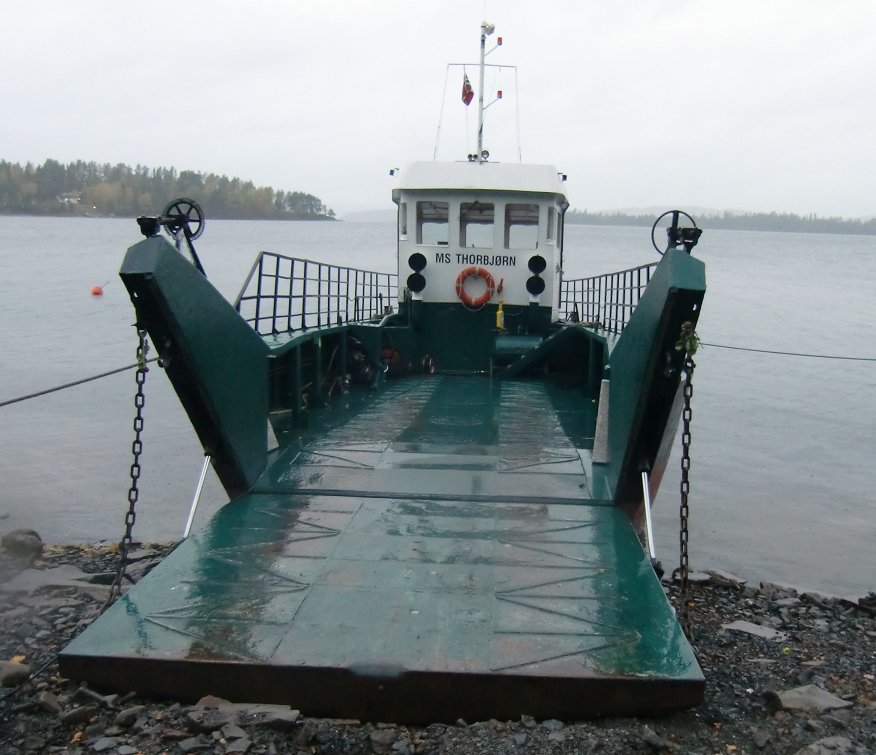
Bow

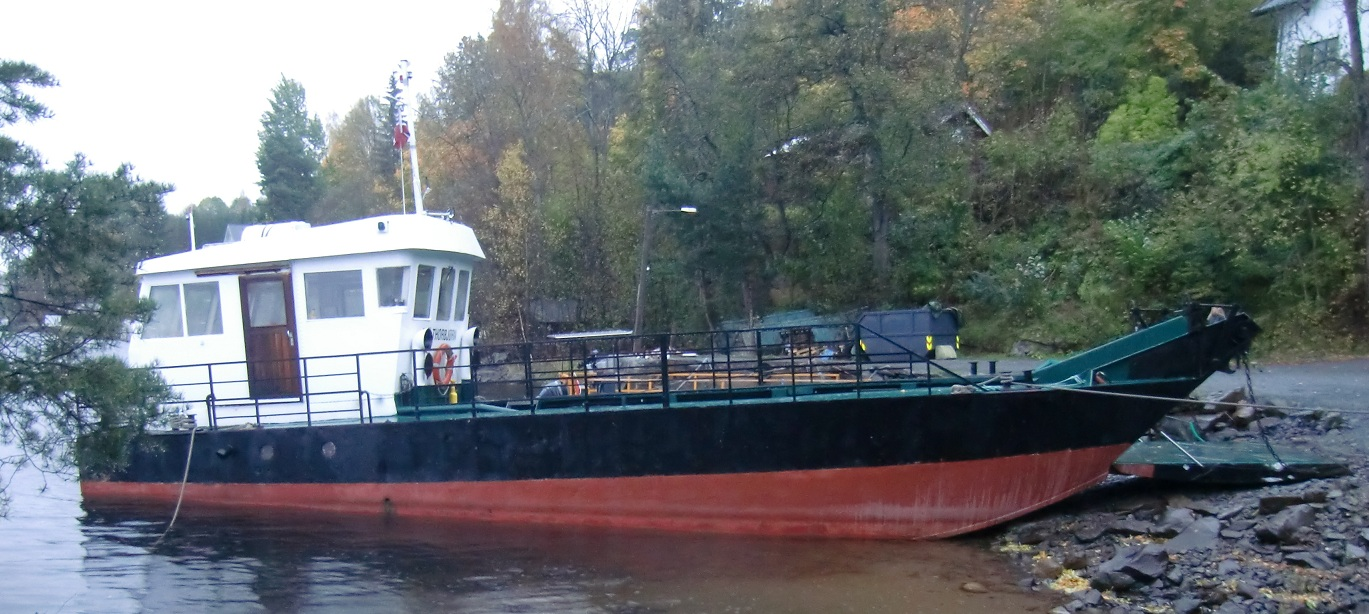
Starboard side

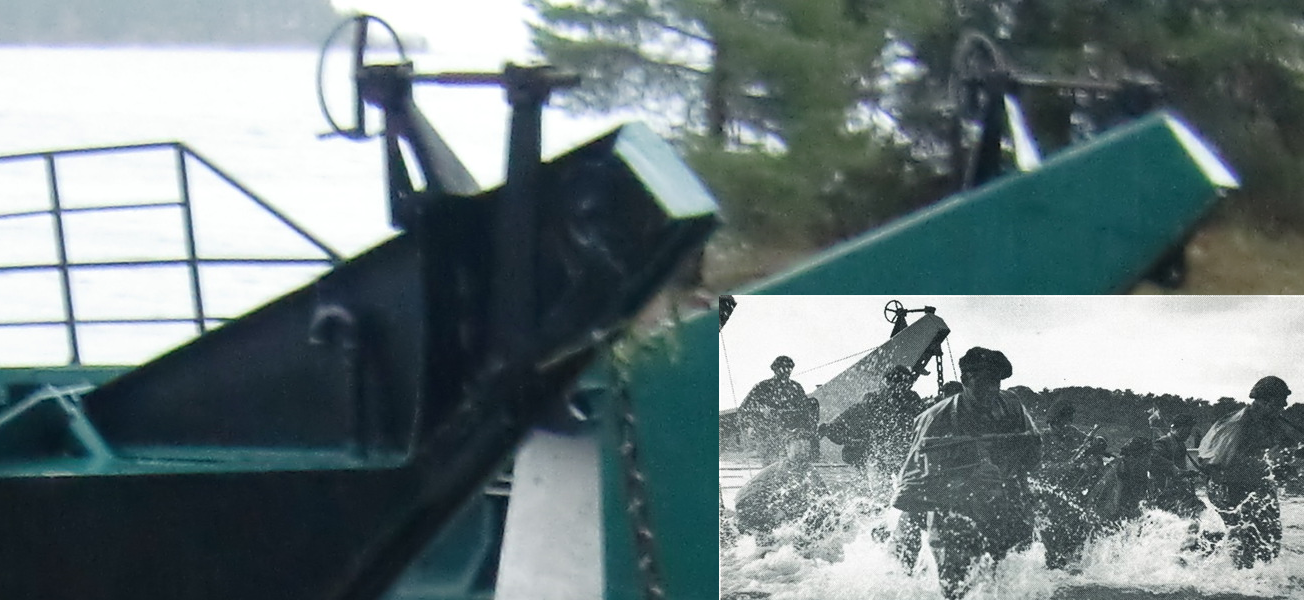
Before and after
