= Kroksund =

Village in Hole Municipality, Norway

Coordinates: 59°37′N 11°35′E

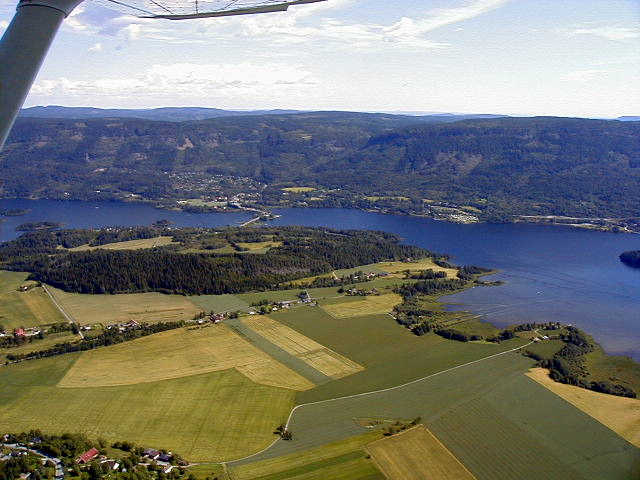
Kroksund and Sundvollen

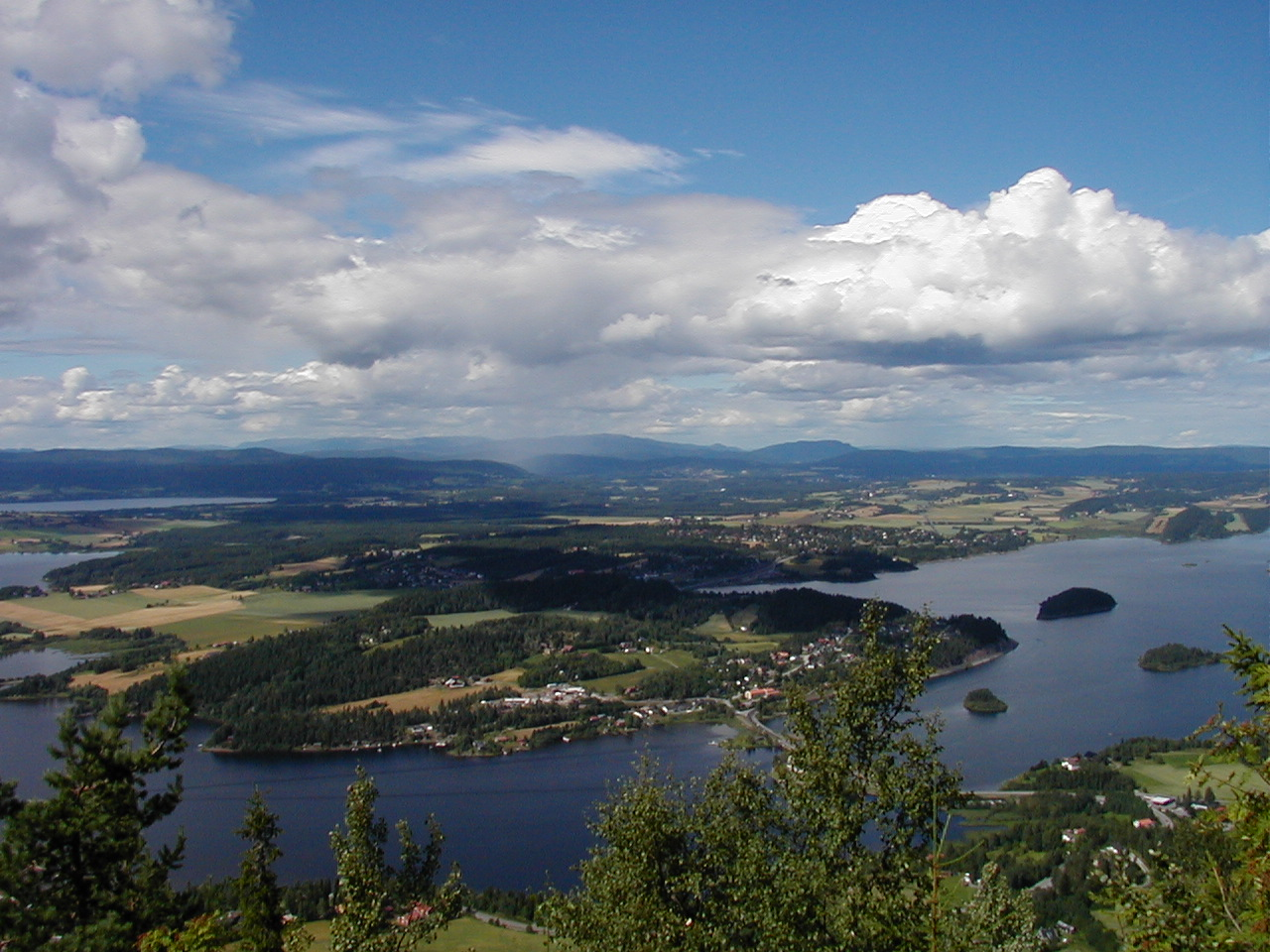
Kroksund bridge viewed from Kongens utsikt

Kroksund is a small village in the municipality of Hole, in Buskerud, Norway.

Kroksund is located just west of Sundvollen. The village had 319 residents as of 1 January 2014. European Route 16 passes over the Kroksundet sound on Steinsfjorden at Kroksund bridge which runs over the islands of Sundøya and Slettøya. Kongens utsikt situated across Steinsfjorden west of Kleivstua in Ringerike provides a panoramic view of both Kroksund and Kroksund bridge.
