= Utøya =

Island in Norway

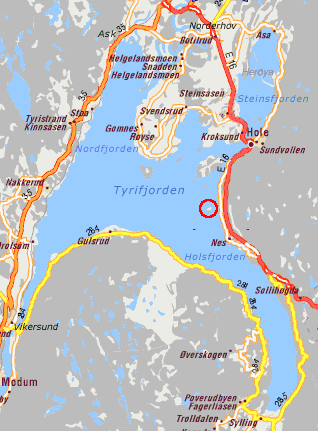
- Detailed map of Tyrifjorden, with Utøya encircled in red

- Location within Norway

Geography
- Location: Tyrifjorden
- Coordinates: 60°01′25″N 010°14′53″E
- Area: 0.106 km^{2} (0.041 sq mi)

Administration
- Norway
- County: Buskerud

Additional information
- Official website: utoya.no

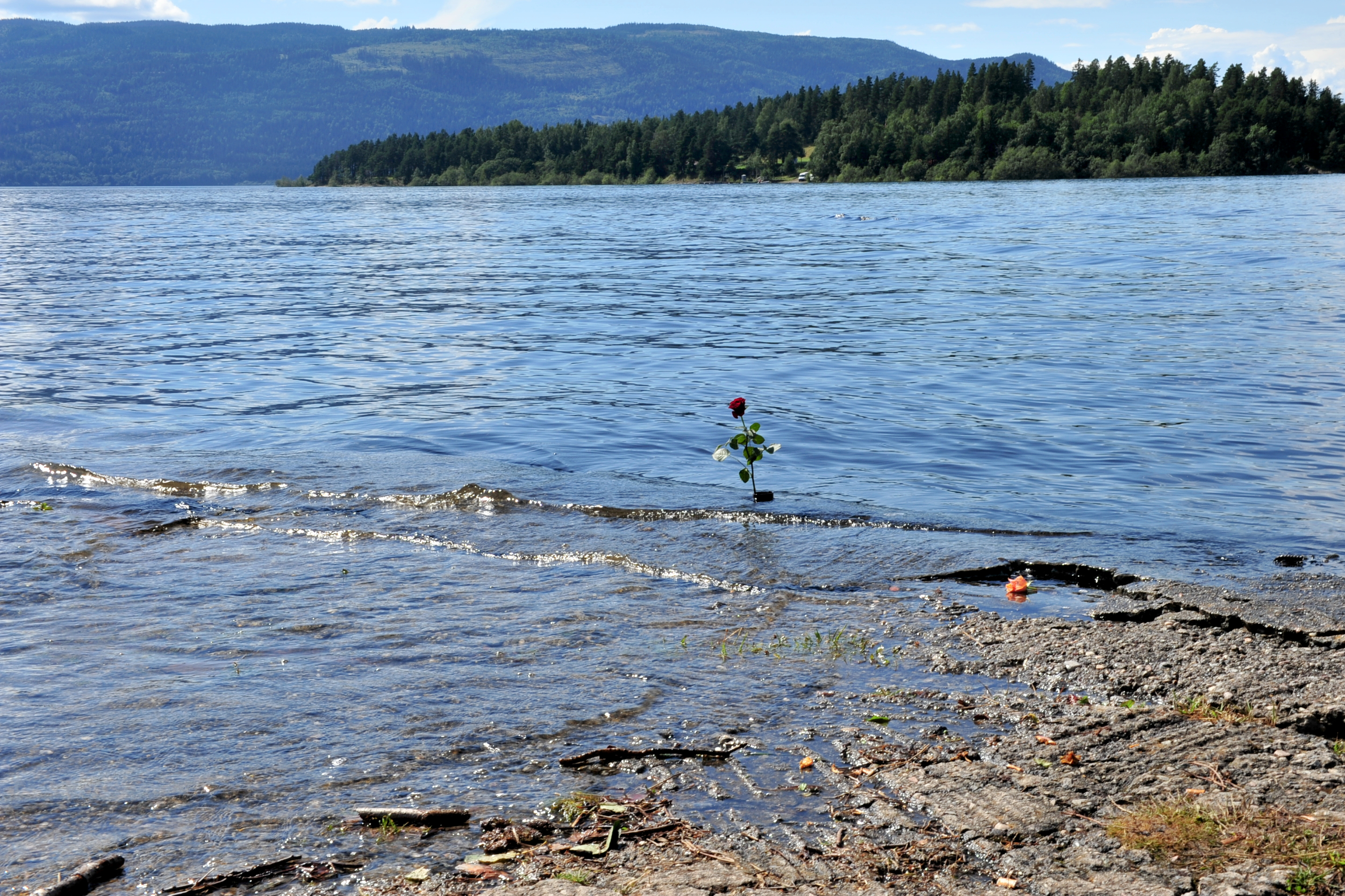
Utøya

Utøya (Norwegian: [ˈʉ̂ːtˌœʏɑ]) is an island in the Tyrifjorden lake in Hole municipality, in the county of Buskerud, Norway. The island is 10.6 hectares (26 acres), situated 500 metres (1,600 ft) off the shore, by the E16 road, about 20 km (12 mi) driving distance south of Hønefoss, and 38 km (24 mi) northwest of Oslo city centre. The 2011 Utøya mass shooting took place on the island.

== Overview ==
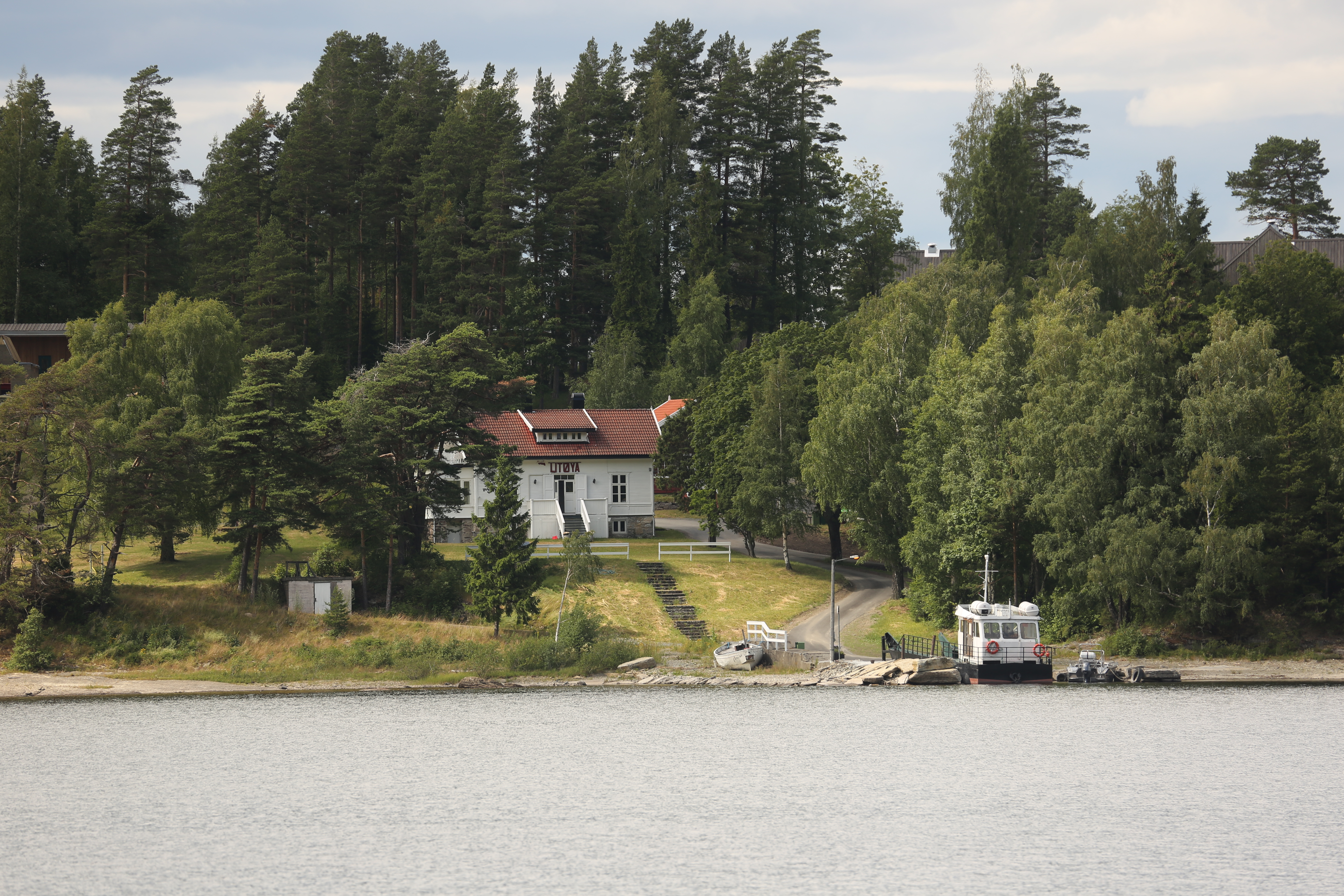
The ferry MS Thorbjørn at the arrival pier at Utøya. The nearest white-painted house is one of the original houses on the island.

Utøya is owned by the Workers' Youth League (AUF), a youth group associated with the Labour Party, which holds an annual summer camp there.

The island is operated commercially by Utøya AS.

The island is largely forested, with some open spaces. A small pier on the east side of the island is used to ferry people to and from Utøykaia on the mainland. There are also permanent buildings. Hovedhuset ("The Main House"), Stabburet ("The Hórreo"), and Låven ("The Barn") are clumped together near the dock. Up on the hillside (LO-toppen) are the main campgrounds, the cafeteria building, and the sanitary building. Skolestua ("The school house") is located further south.

== Etymology ==
The first element ut means 'out', or 'outermost'; the last element øya is the definite form of øy, meaning 'island'. Utøya is the southernmost (or farthest "out") island of three which lie in the lake of Tyrifjorden. The name is used in reference to its position in relation to two other islands lying north of Utøya, Storøya (Big Isle) and Geitøya (Goat Isle). Storøya is the northernmost, and Geitøya lies between Utøya and Storøya. All of these islands were formerly used for herding by the people at Sundvollen. Utøya is quite clearly connected to the name of Utvika on the shoreside.

== History ==
The island was a croft until purchased by the politician Jens Bratlie in 1893. Bratlie used the property as a summer residence until 1933 when it was purchased by the Trade Union Confederation.

The island was given as a commemorative gift by the Oslo Trade Union Confederation on 28 August 1950, and it has hosted several political organizations' summer camps.

=== 2011 massacre ===
On 22 July 2011, a mass shooting took place at the AUF's summer youth camp, where 650 young people were staying. Anders Behring Breivik arrived alone on Utøya dressed as a police officer and told those on the island that he was there for security reasons following the explosions in Oslo which he caused a few hours earlier. He then began shooting at individuals, continuing until the police arrived one hour after the first alarm call. The suspect immediately surrendered. Combined, the attacks in Oslo and Utøya left 77 dead, with 69 killed on the island, 33 of whom were under the age of 18.

=== After the massacre ===
According to the island's manager (as of 2016), Jørgen Watne Frydnes, "Rapidly it became clear, that ... [the bereaved] needed more time. [Construction work, or] The construction was put on hold for two years".

After the attack, several donations were given to AUF for the restoration of the island. Some of the buildings had been demolished, as of 2016, including parts of the cafeteria building where 13 people had been killed.

With some disagreement having been bridged (as of 2016), the future of Utøya has been a source of disagreements among the victims of the attacks and their families. While the AUF planned to rapidly rebuild and return to Utøya, others wanted to leave the island as a memorial to the dead.

The massacre at Utøya remains the deadliest mass shooting worldwide committed by a single perpetrator.

== Places and buildings ==
Bays on the island's coastline include Bolsjevika.

There are paths including Kjærlighetsstien (lovers' lane or 'the love path').

A hill – "used by discussion [groups]" leads to [a barn, according to its name,] Arbeidsmiljølåven. Other buildings are "the café building" and the pump house.

As of 2016, ["the hill"] "Bakken" is used by the audience for speeches.

=== Memorial place ===
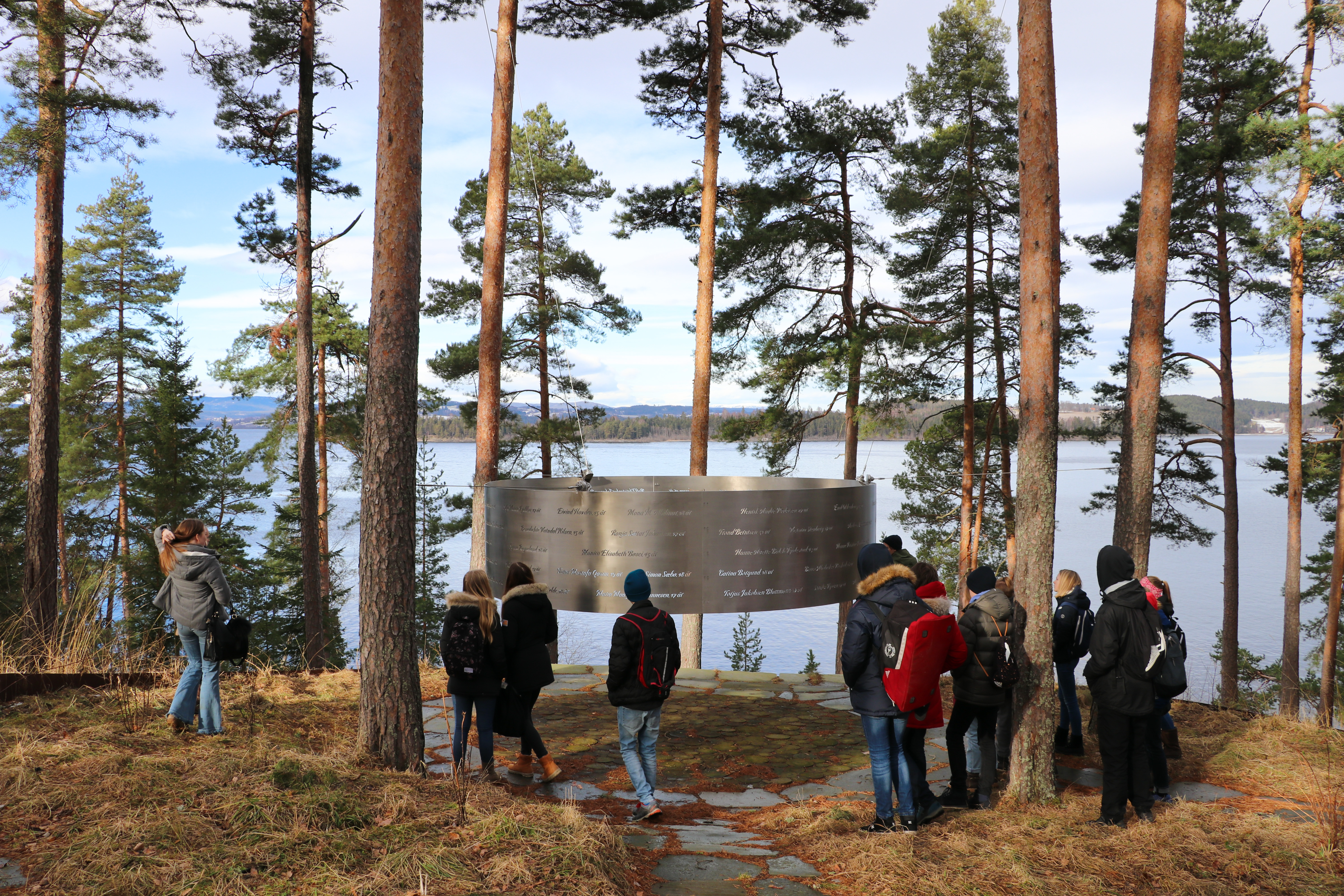
The place of memorial is called Lysninga ("the clearing"); a part of it is Ringen ["the ring"].

The place of memorial is called Lysninga ("the clearing") which lies at the highest point of the island. It was unveiled during the summer of 2015.

Components of the memorial place include Ringen ("the ring") – a "ring of steel [that] hangs between trees and here the names and age of the majority of those 69 killed are engraved".

The 'ring' weighs one (metric) ton; one part of it weighs 350 kilograms. Alice Greenwald gave advice about leaving some space on 'the ring', so that some of the bereaved can later change their mind – so that their deceased relative's name is permitted to be engraved on it.

=== Hegnhuset ("safeguard house") ===
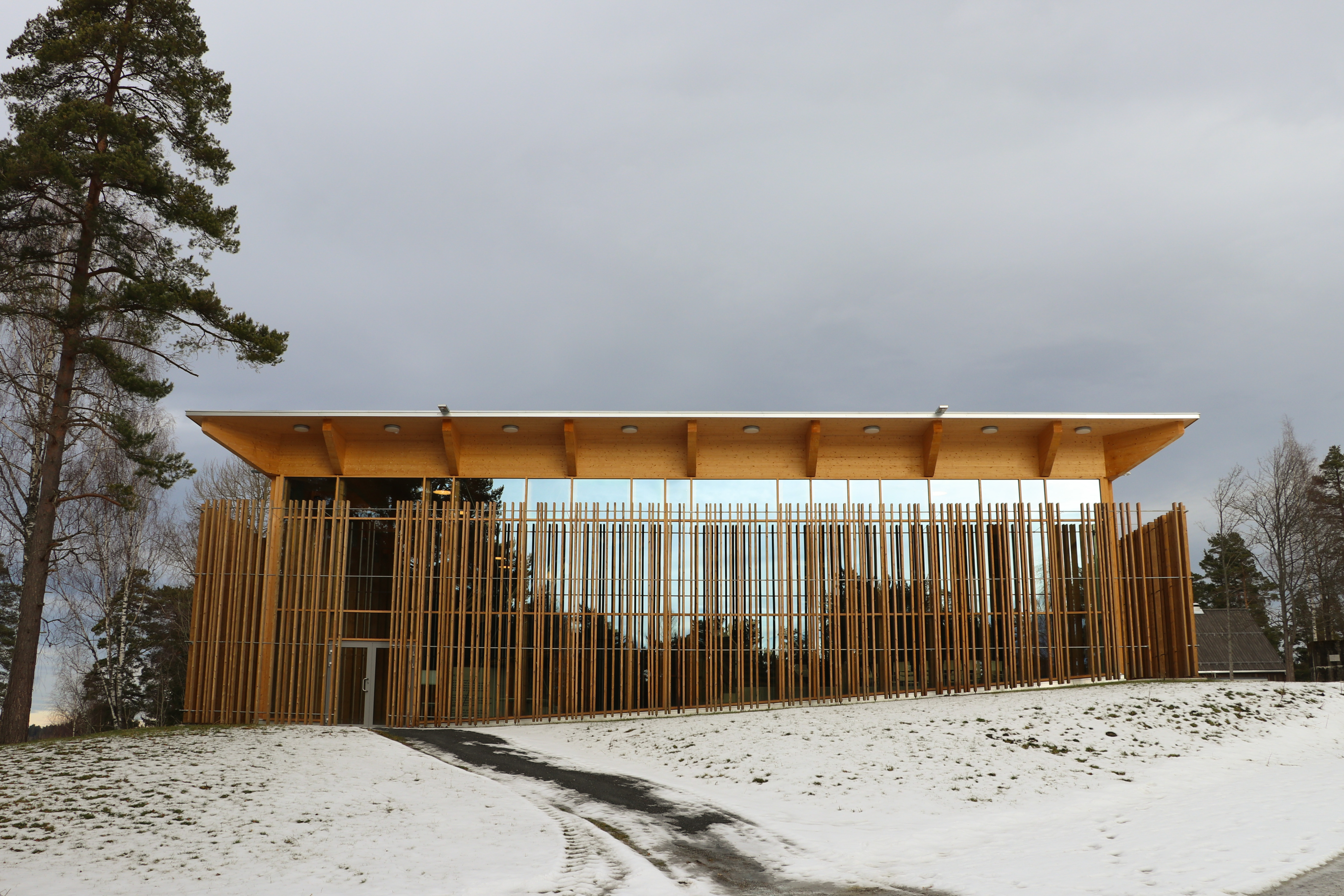
Hegnhuset in 2017

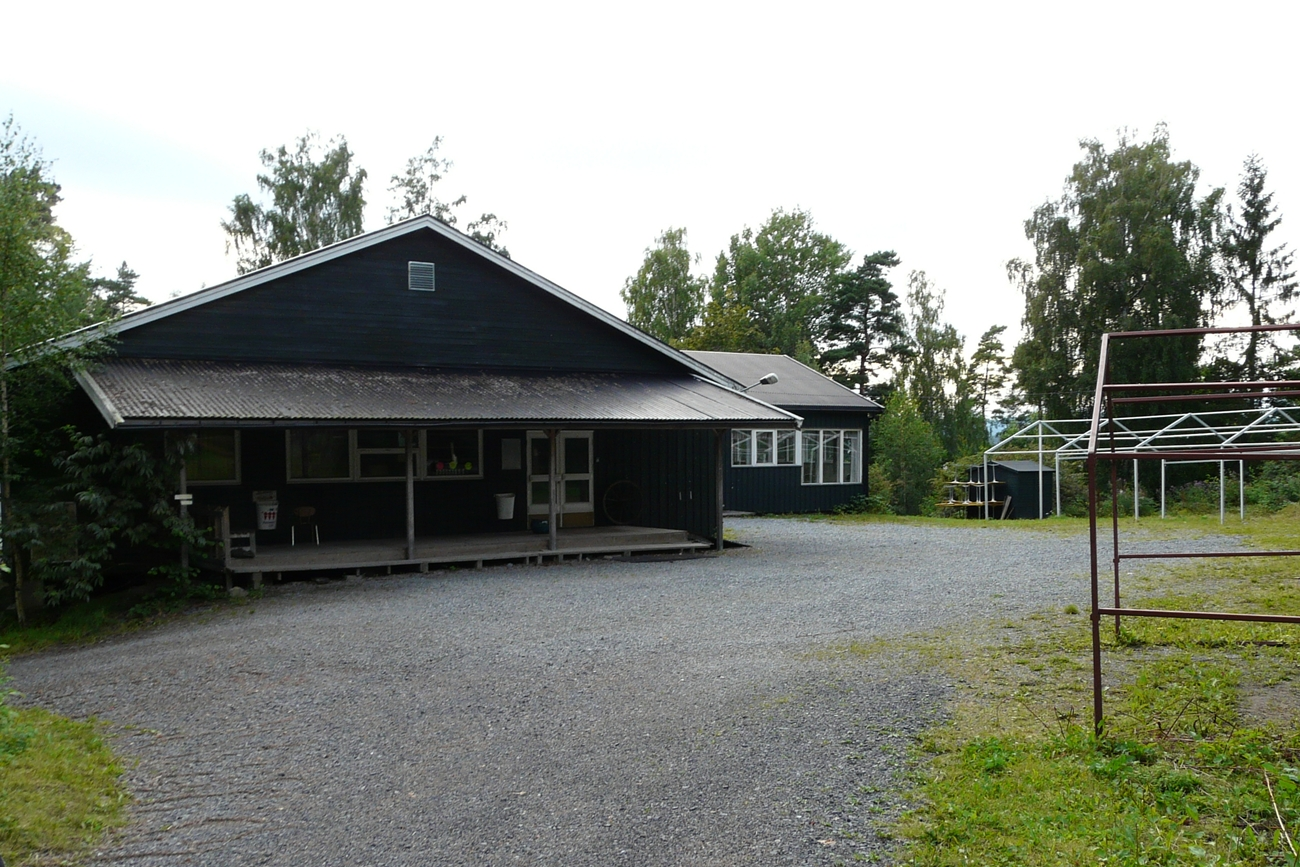
Photo from 2012. In 2014, the AUF decided not to tear down the building.

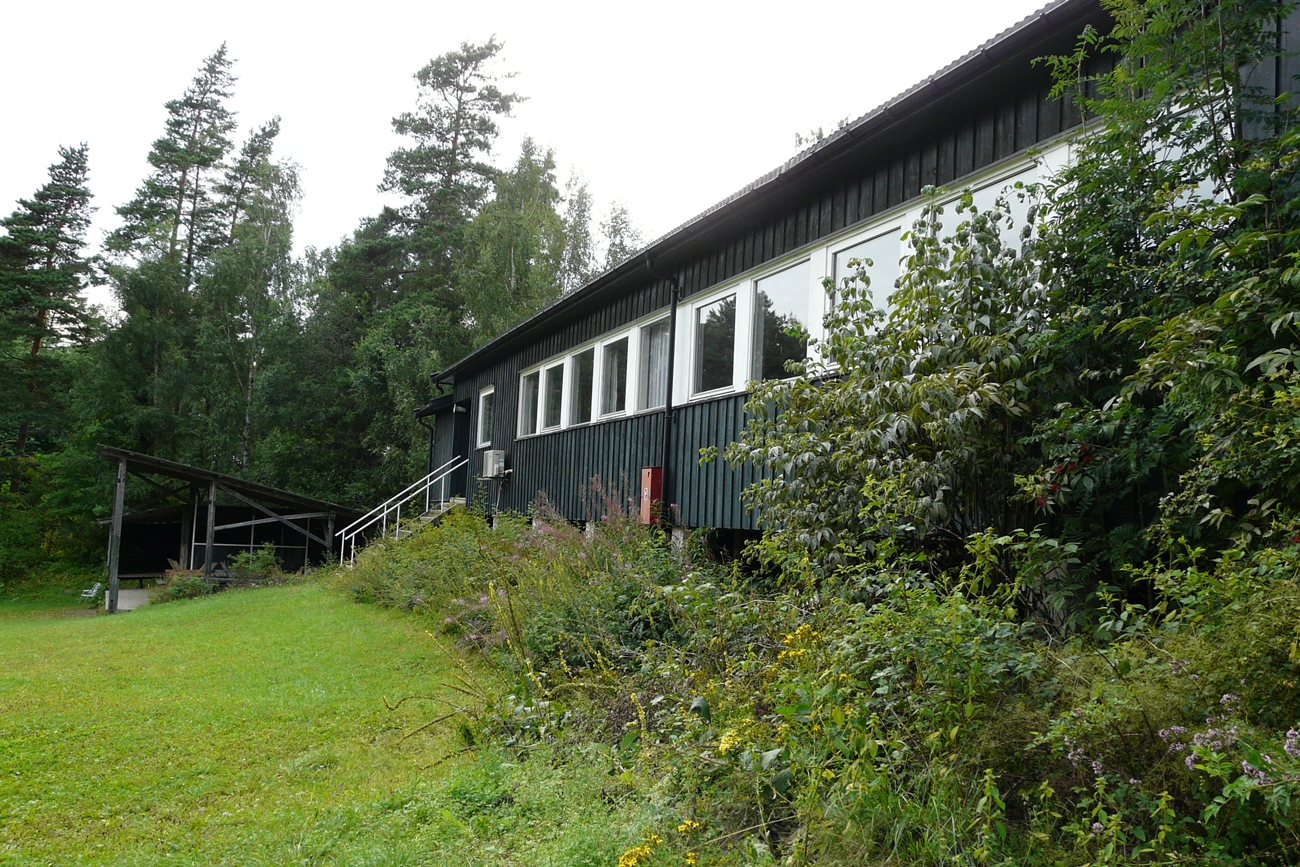
Photo from 2012. Thirteen people were killed inside, and several youths escaped or jumped out of open windows.

Hegnhuset – consists of "parts of the café building (kafébygget) ..., where 13 people were killed ..., [that] have been preserved (as of 2016); around- and under the café building – a læringssenter ("learning center")" has been created; 69 columns support the roof, inside the glass walls (of the exterior of the building). 495 "safeguarding" planks – positioned vertical in the ground – enclose the building; with space – svalgang – between the planks and the building.

"The house will protect the memory of the 69 who were killed at Utøya", wrote the father of one of the massacre's survivors in a newspaper article.

The building has been named Hegnhuset – "a place that shall safeguard (hegne) democracy". A synonym of hegn is the imperative form of the verb "safeguard"; therefore Hegnhuset can mean "safeguard house" (with the determinate conjugation of "house").

Inside the café building, preserved (as of 2016) are bullet holes in walls, "the open windows where several youths jumped out to escape" the murderer; an old chart (that was there in 2011) that says "you must know the past, to understand the present and peer into the future", and pictures of dead victims; at least one heart-shaped stone, with the inscription "Missing you [singular]", lies on the floor.

In lillesalen ("the small hall"), there is a piano; one was there during the crime. Court testimony has indicated that persons hiding behind the piano on 22 July 2011 were shot.

In 2016, Oliver Wainwright named it one of the "top 10 buildings of 2016", adding that "the Hegnhuset on the island of Utøya makes a simple, powerful record of an event that shook the very foundations of Norway's national identity. The cafe building, where Anders Breivik murdered ... before killing a further 50 on the island, has been retained as a stark relic, its walls sliced with Matta-Clark rawness, and encased in a simple timber and glass pavilion".
