= Helgelandsmoen =

Village in Norway

Coordinates: 60°6′N 10°13′E

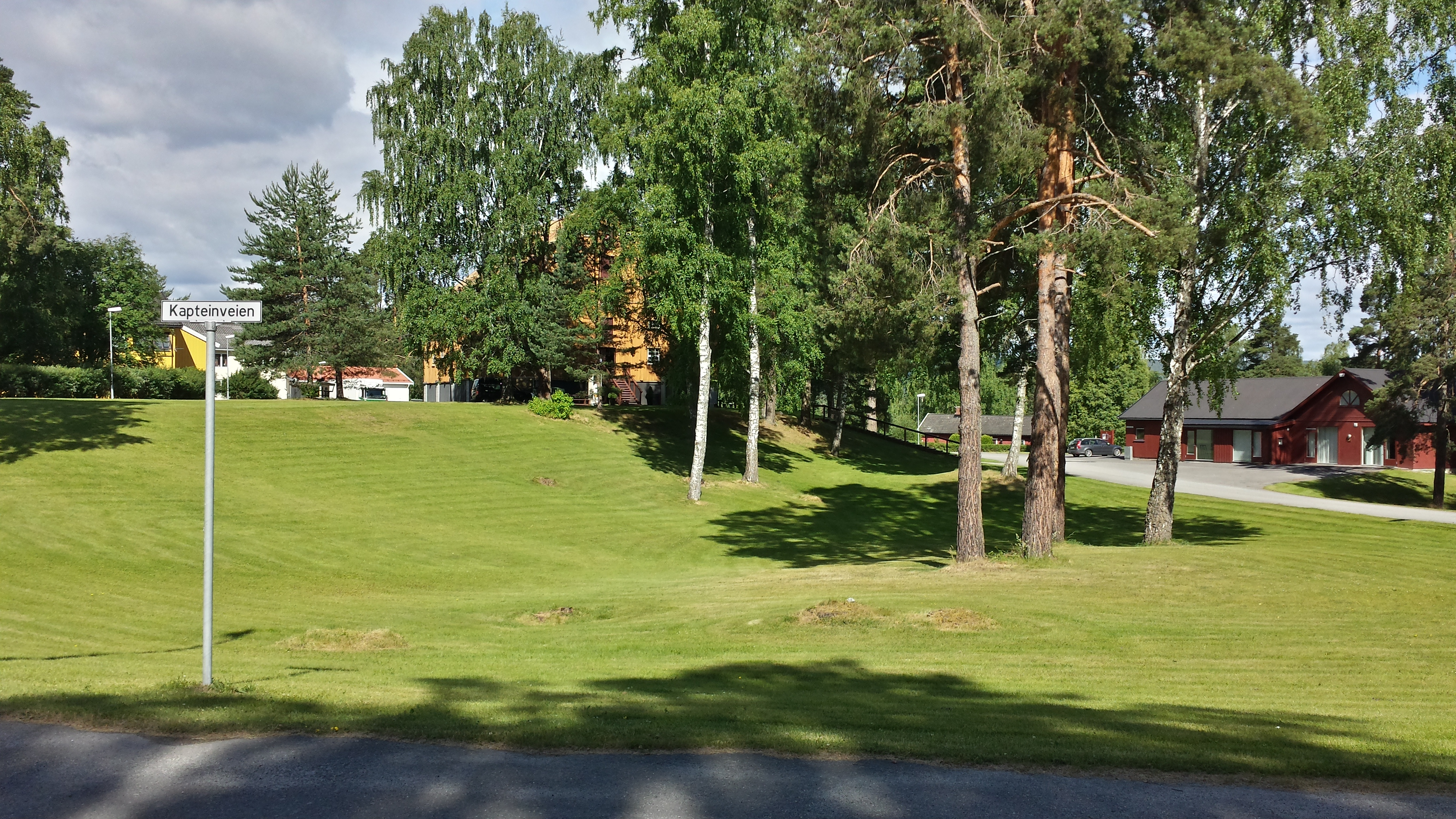
Helgelandsmoen næringspark

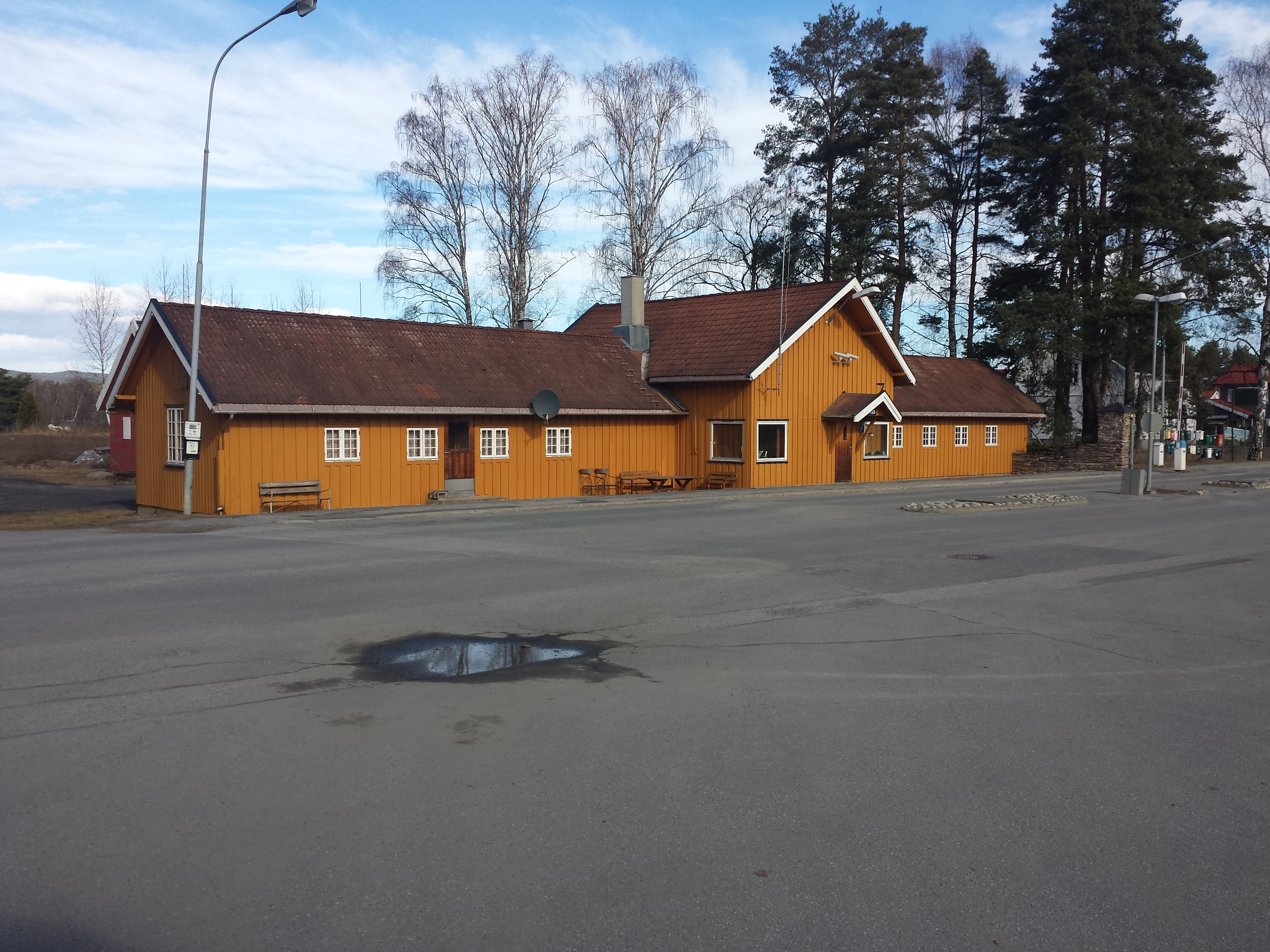
Helgelandsmoen Leir

Helgelandsmoen is a village located in Buskerud, Norway.

Helgelandsmoen is situated in Hole on the border between Norderhov in Ringerike. The village had 551 residents as of 1 January 2014, located mainly in the Hole, but extends partially into neighboring Ringerike. The village was the site of Helgelandsmoen Leir, a former military camp. The Army base was established in 1868 to house the 2nd Akershus Infantry Brigade (Akershusske Infanteribrigade). Helgelandsmoen Leir was closed in 2004. Helgelandsmoen Industrial AS (Helgelandsmoen Næringspark) is an industrial park located on the site of the former army camp. The property, which includes a hotel, restaurant, conference and exhibition center, is located beside the Storelva River, about eight kilometers south of Hønefoss.
