= Sundvollen =

Settlement in Hole Municipality, Norway

Coordinates: 60°04′N 10°20′E

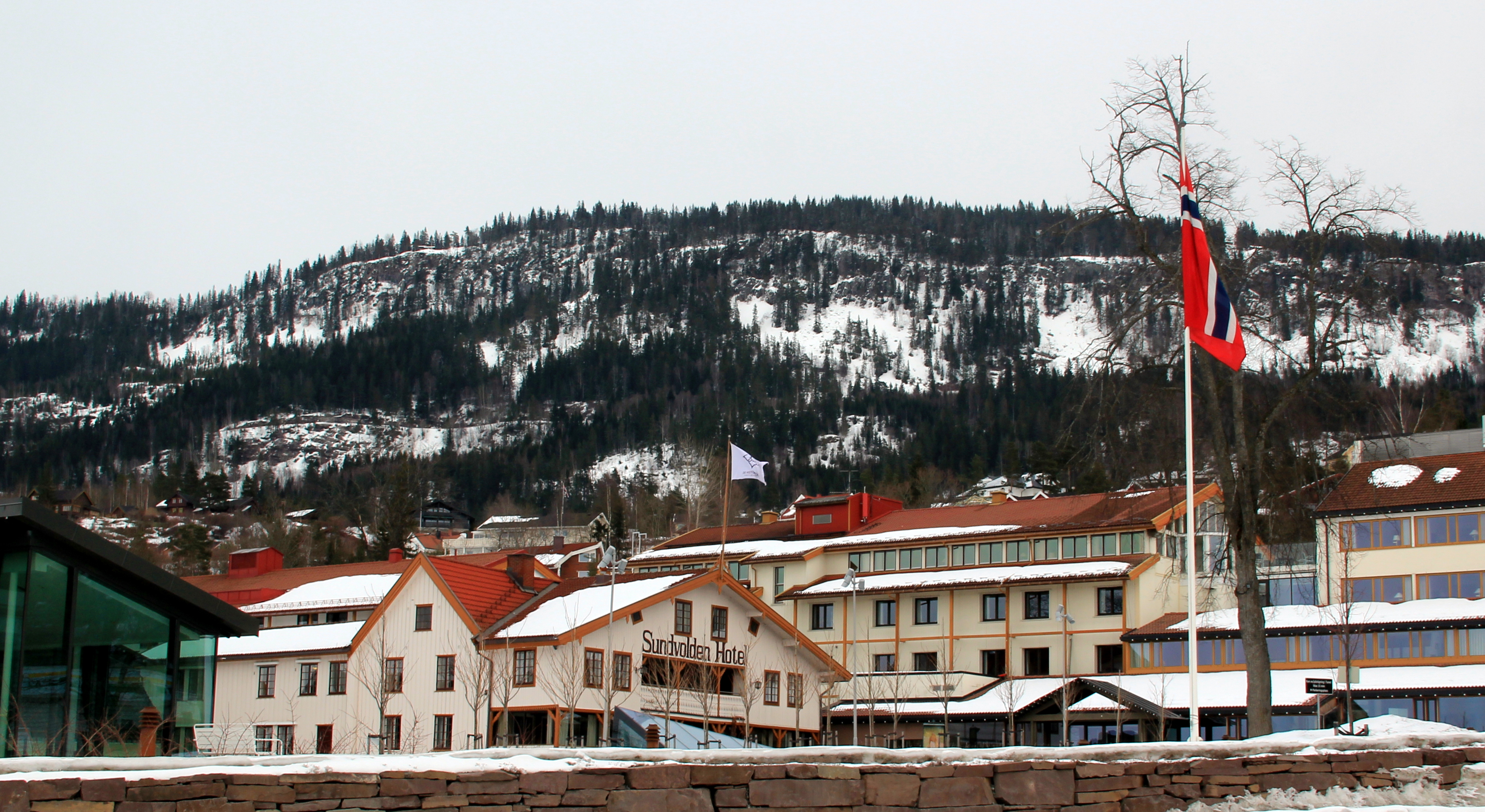
Sundvolden Hotel

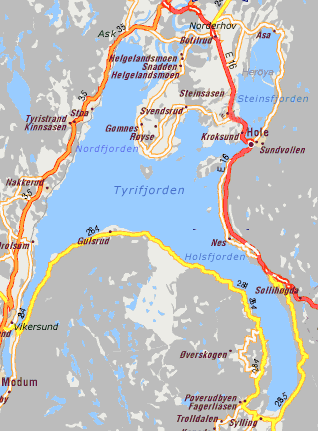
Map of Tyrifjorden with Sundvollen on E16

Sundvollen is a village in the municipality of Hole, in the county of Buskerud, Norway. Sundvollen is located along the east side of Tyrifjorden where the E16 crosses west over Steinsfjorden, the northeastern arm of Tyrifjorden, to Kroksund. The village had 801 inhabitants as of January 2009.

Sundvollen (Sundvolden) was first the name of the local farm, which included much of the local real estate. The name is connected to the lake's formation, which narrows in this area. In the census of 1801, 71 persons lived at and nearby the farm (both farmers and serfs with their families). From the farm, the hotel sprung, possibly as a wayside inn first. As a crucial meeting point, the farm prospered from serving travelers going up to central Ringerike.

Sundvollen is most noted for the hotels, Sundvolden and Kleivstua. Sundvolden Hotel is one of Norway's oldest hotels. It was mentioned in written sources dating from 1648. Kleivstua Hotel is also an inn with a long tradition. It was originally a coaching inn in 1780, which catered to travelers between Christiania and Ringerike. It was situated on the Old Royal Bergen Road (Den bergenske kongevei), the historic road between Oslo and Hadeland. The Old Royal Bergen Road included Kroksund bridge, an old stone structure at Sundvollen. The road also formed part of the old Pilgrim's Route from Oslo to Trondheim.

Krokskogen is a forested area south of Sundvollen, which is part of Oslomarka. The steep Krokkleiva through Krokskogen was part of King Road (Kongevei) between Sundvollen and Kleivstua. The road was constructed 3–6 meters wide at the end of the 1700s to raise the road standard regarding increasing charcoal transport to Bærums Verk in Lommedalen.

== Other sources ==
- Lønnå, Finn (1992) Langs Kongevei og gammel Drammensvei i Asker og Bærum (Asker og Bærum Historielag)
