= Landing Craft L-50 =

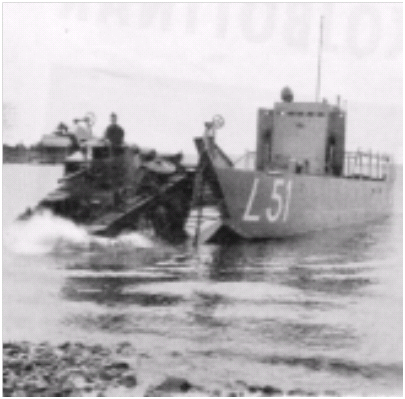
- Swedish L50 boat

Class overview
- Name: L-50
- In service: 1948 to 1980

General characteristics
- Type: Mechanized landing craft
- Displacement: 31 ton
- Length: 17.18 m (56.4 ft)
- Beam: 4.8 m (16 ft)
- Draft: 1.15 m (3.8 ft)

The Landing Craft L-50 was a mechanized landing craft used by the Swedish Navy and the Swedish Coastal Artillery from the 1950s to the 1980s.

At that time the Swedish Coastal Artillery was a separate military branch consisting of five regiments. After several reorganizations, they are today called the 1st Marine Regiment (Amf 1) and located in Berga Naval Base. The Coastal Rangers (Kustjägarna) are also part of the Swedish Navy. They have replaced their old L-50 boats with Fast Attack Craft 90H.

The L50-boats could carry both vehicles and personnel and was designed specifically for landing of coastal rangers under fire. During the crossing the personnel was protected behind the vessel's steel hull and a massive ramp at the bow. The vessel was built with a flat bottom so it could run well into shallow beaches without run aground. When the vessel had run as close to land as possible, the ramp went rapidly down and the personnel stormed ashore, if necessary by use of fire and movement. The initially goal was normally to establish a beachhead in order to ensure the landing of the main force.

Today some of the L50 boats have been rebuilt and are currently used by governments and private organizations throughout Scandinavia.

== Ships in the class ==
- L-51 – Navy
- L-52 – Navy → Hårsfjärden
- L-53 – Navy → Coastal artillery (KA 2) → Navy
- L-54 – Navy → Coastal artillery (KA 2)
- L-55 – Navy → Hårsfjärden

== See also ==
- MS Thorbjørn
