= Hole, Norway =

Hole Municipality Hole kommune
- Municipality
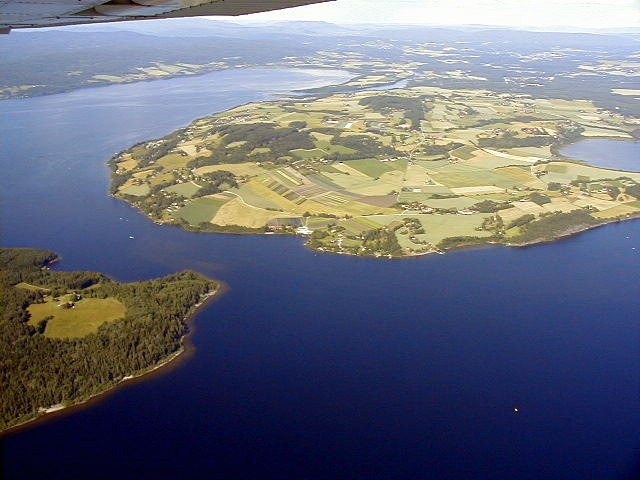

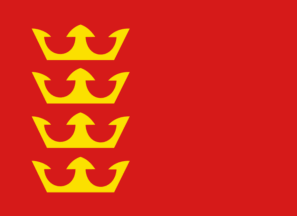
- Flag Coat of arms

- Buskerud within Norway

- Hole within Buskerud
- Coordinates: 60°2′52″N 10°17′28″E
- Country: Norway
- County: Buskerud
- District: Ringerike
- Administrative centre: Vik

Government
  - Mayor (2003): Syver Leivestad (H)

Area
  - Total: 198 km^{2} (76 sq mi)
  - Land: 134 km^{2} (52 sq mi)
  - Rank: #329 in Norway

Population (2004)
  - Total: 5,199
  - Rank: #187 in Norway
  - Density: 39/km^{2} (100/sq mi)
  - Change (10 years): ▲ +13.6%
- Demonym: Holeværing

Official language
  - Norwegian form: Bokmål
- Time zone: UTC+01:00 (CET)
  - Summer (DST): UTC+02:00 (CEST)
- ISO 3166 code: NO-3310
- Website: Official website

Hole is a municipality in Buskerud county, Norway. It is part of the traditional region of Ringerike. The administrative centre of the municipality is the village of Vik. Hole is located around lake Tyrifjorden and extends to the woodland around Oslo. The soil is fertile and suited to growing fruit, berries and other agricultural products.

The municipality of Hole was established on 1 January 1838 (see formannskapsdistrikt). The annex of Tyristrand was separated from Hole on 1 July 1916 to become a municipality of its own. The municipality of Hole was merged into the neighboring municipality of Ringerike in 1964, however, this merger ended in 1977 when Hole was restored as a separate municipality.

Infrastructure: the road (E16) between Sandvika and Hønefoss has been Norway's most deadly, for the ten-year period that ended in 2021; nine people died.

== Name ==
The municipality (originally the parish) is named after the old Hole farm (Old Norse: Hólar), since the first church was built there. The name is the plural form of hóll which means "round (and isolated) hill".

== Coat of arms ==
The municipality's coat of arms was granted 24 May 1985 with the blazon: I rødt fire gull kroner, 1-1-1-1 (Gules, four crowns in pale Or.) The crowns symbolize the four Norwegian Kings who lived in the area of the municipality in the 9th–11th centuries:

- Halfdan the Black; a 9th century king of Vestfold. He died in 860 when he fell through the ice of Randsfjorden. According to Heimskringla, his body was divided into four parts, as each of the districts of his kingdom wanted to claim his grave.
- Sigurd Syr; an 11th-century petty king of Ringerike, and the great-great-grandchild of King Harald Fairhair (900-940). He was known as a peaceful and humble man, who was mainly interested in agricultural matters, which was exceptional for a king at the time. Sigurd Syr married the widow Åsta Gudbrandsdatter, who had a son, Olaf, today known as Saint Olaf.
- Saint Olaf (Olaf Haraldsson), son of the aforementioned Åsta and his stepfather King Sigurd Syr, reigned from 1015 to 1028. His real father was Harald Grenske, who had been killed in 995, while Åsta was pregnant.
- Harald Hårdråde, the half brother of Olaf Haraldsson, reigned from 1046 to 1066. As a king he was known for his tough rule. He was only 15 years old when he fought in the battle of Stiklestad in 1030, where Saint Olaf was killed.

Number of minorities (1st and 2nd generation) in Hole by country of origin in 2017
Ancestry	Number
Poland	255
Russia	64
Denmark	63
Lithuania	58
Sweden	53
Germany	43
Philippines	35

== History ==
Hole has an extensive and important role in Norwegian history. Archeological finds from the Roman and Migration periods are numerous. Hole is also known as one of the traditional landscapes from the Viking Age and plays a prominent role in the Norse sagas.

King Halfdan the Black of Vestfold conquered the Ringerike traditional district, including Hole, in about 830 AD. According to saga, when he died he was so popular that every district wanted his body. As a result, his body was quartered; his head was buried in the mound at the Stein estate in Hole. Halfdan the Black's second wife, Ragnild from Hole, was the mother of the first king of Norway, Harald I of Norway (also known as Harald Fairhair).

Saint Olaf (king of Norway from 1015 to 1028) was born in Hole, near where the 12th century Bønsnes Church (Bønsnes kirke) is located, to Harold Grenske (a grandson of Harald I of Norway) and his wife Asta. Asta later remarried to Sigurd Syr, chieftain of Hole, and had a son born there named Harold, (Harald Hårdråde) who later became Harald III Sigurdsson (king of Norway from 1046 to 1066) .

Ringerkike's famous poet, Jørgen Moe, was brought up on the Mo (or Moe) farm in Hole. Many of the fairy tales gathered by Asbjørnsen and Moe were collected in this area. Frognøya and Størøya are also important historical places in Hole.

On July 22, 2011, the Workers' Youth League summer camp, which took place on Utøya in Hole, was attacked as part of the 2011 Norway attacks.

== Geography ==
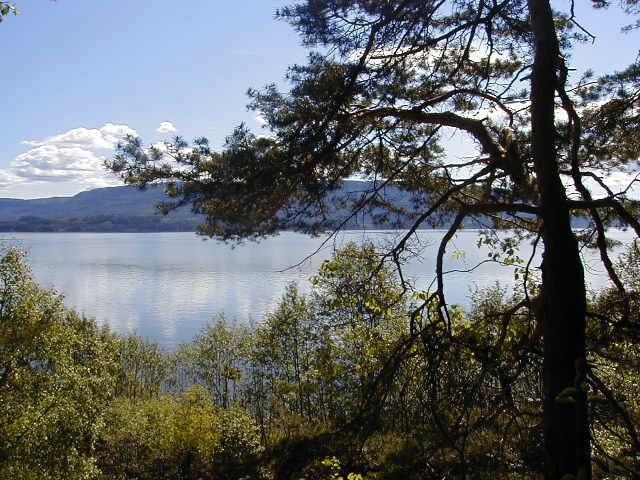
Tyrifjorden

The municipality of Hole is bordered on the north by Ringerike municipality, in the east by Bærum municipality and in the south by Lier municipality. South of the lake Tyrifjorden it also borders on Modum municipality. Most of the residents live in the villages of Sundvollen, Vik, Kroksund, Helgelandsmoen, Steinsåsen, Røyse, and Sollihøgda.

From the viewpoint "Kongens utsikt" which lies on Krokskogen, there are views of the landscape of Hole. The main road between Oslo and Bergen, European route E16, runs through the community.

== Government ==
The current mayor is Per Ragnvald Berger (born 18 October 1952), representing Høyre, the Conservatives, reelected for 2011–2015. Berger is in for his fourth term and was first elected in 1999.

== Stein Church Ruins ==
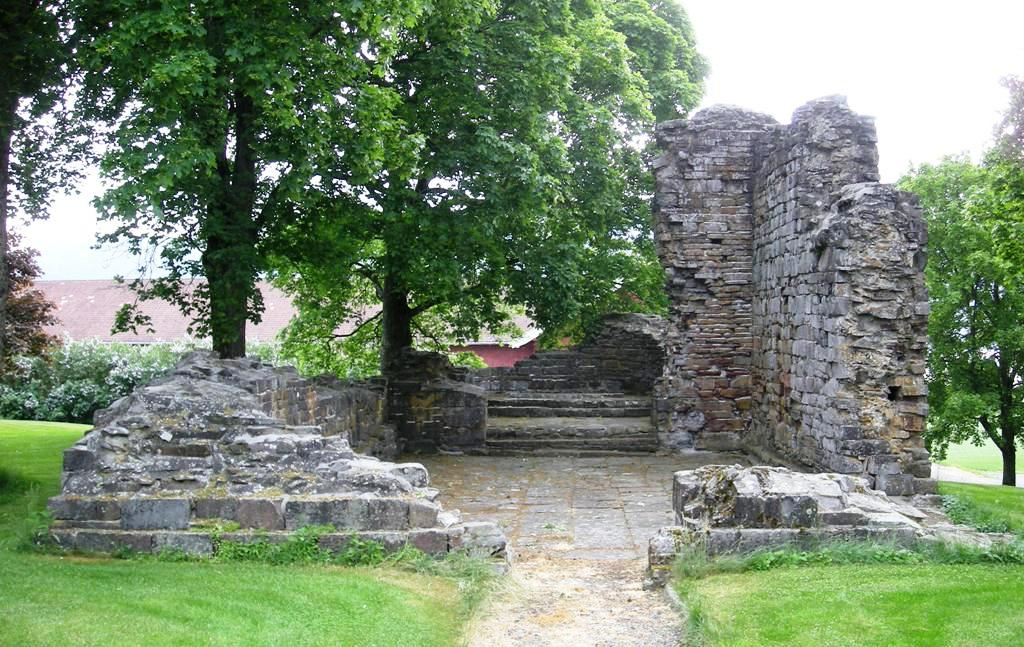
Stein kirkeruin

Stein Church Ruins (Stein kirkeruin) are located at Steinsfjorden. Originally constructed in the latter half of the 1100s, it was built of sandstone and limestone from the area. The chapel had a rectangular nave and narrower, very short choir area. The sanctuary had portals in the west and south. By the second half of the 1500s, the chapel was no longer in use. In the 1570s, the inventory had been transferred Hamar Cathedral.

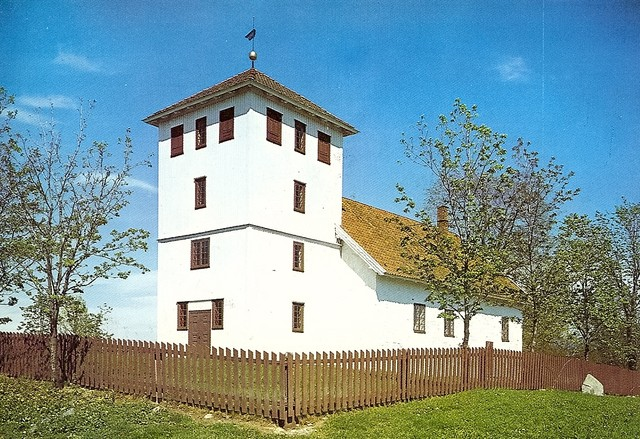
Bønsnes Church

== Bønsnes Church ==
Bønsnes church (Bønsnes Kirke) is a small medieval era church. It is built of brick and was built in 1100. The church has rectangular plan and 80 seats. The church has conservation status protected. Bønsnes church has a later added wooden tower in front of the west gable. The tower is probably built in connection with repairs to the roof and masonry in the 1850s. In 1500s and 1600s the church decayed. It was only after it was enabled in 1728, it was brought back into use.

In 1790 the interior was given a new decor. Painted clouds are on the ceiling, the pulpit and the gallery. The altarpiece is probably from the 1700s, featuring the Crucifixion and the Last Supper, surrounded by leaf ornaments, columns and sculptures. The medieval interior has a Madonna sculpture from the 1200s and a crucifix from the 1400s.

== Hole Church ==
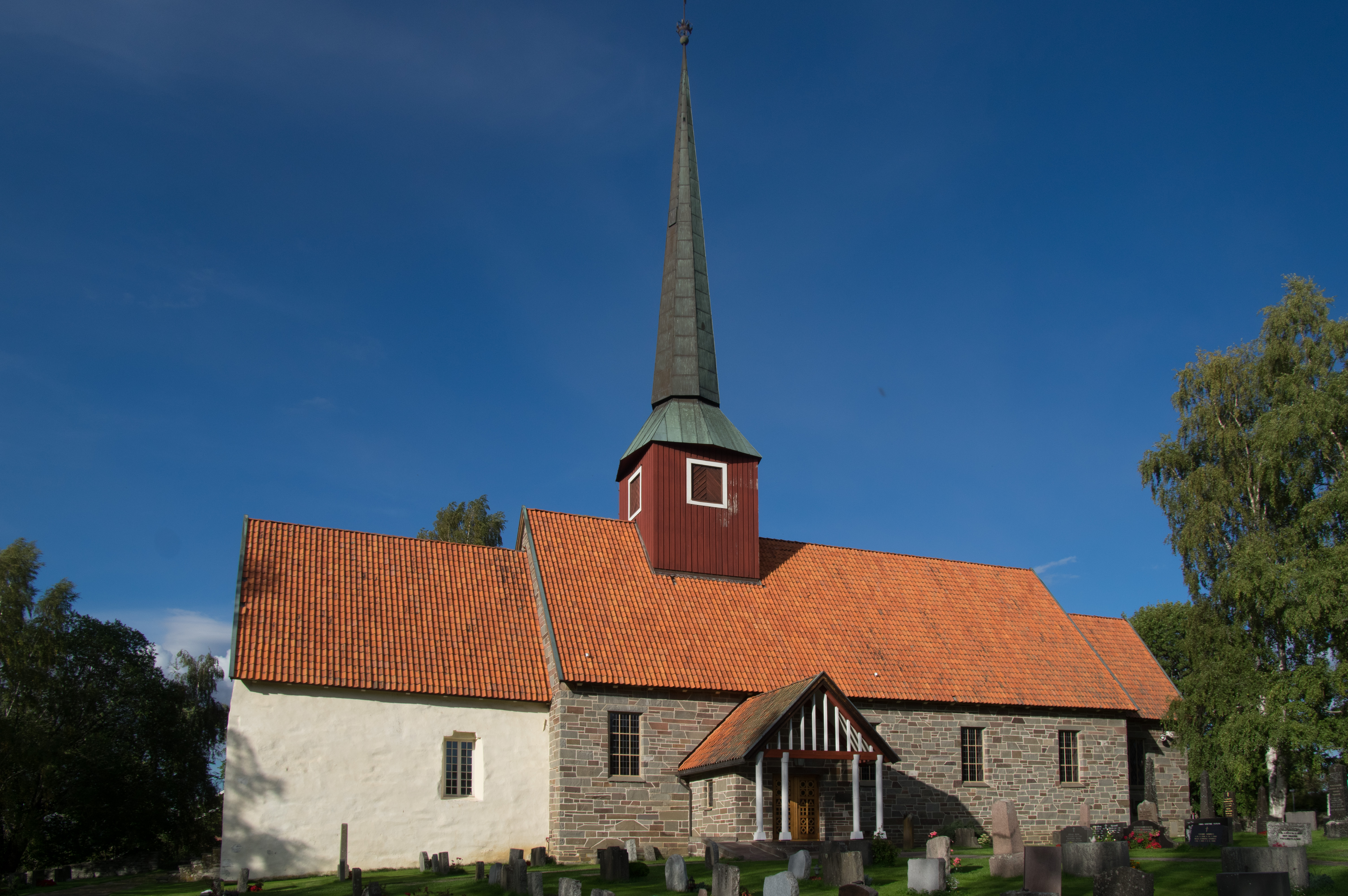
Hole Church, Buskerud

Hole Church (Hole kirke) probably stems from approximately 1200. It is located in a hilly landscape around 5 km southwest of Norderhov Church on a peninsula in Tyrifjord. The edifice is of stone and has 350 seats. The altarpiece in the Rococo style. It was largely destroyed by fire in 1736. The church was rebuilt in 1737. Repairs, restorations and remodeling occurred during 1827 and 1909. The old church burned to the ground after a lightning strike in 1943. The restored church is built by sandstone from the district and consists of a long, rectangular nave and a narrower, almost square choir in the east.

== Notable residents ==
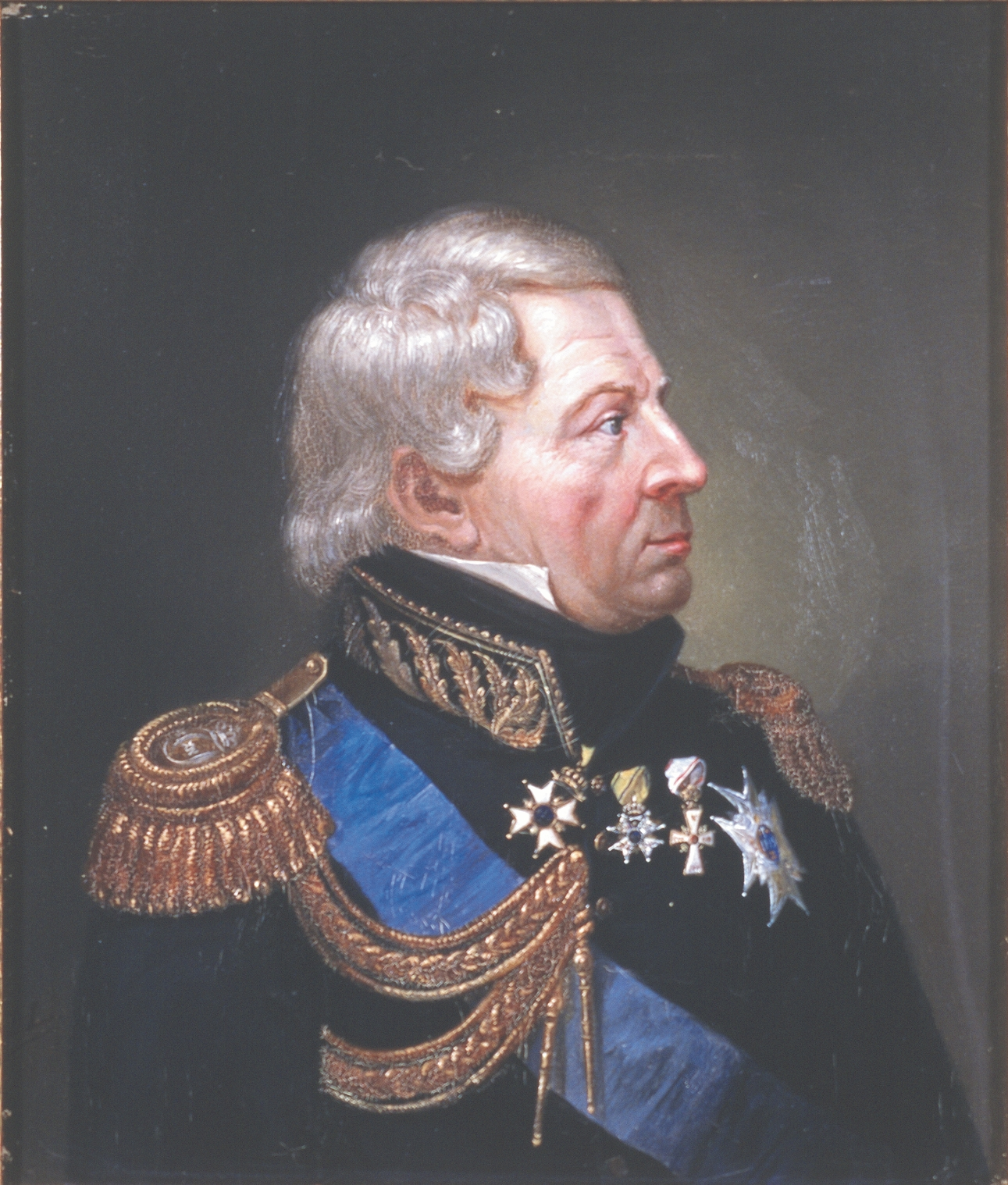
Frederik Wilhelm Stabell, 1814

- Frederik Wilhelm Stabell (1763–1836) a military officer and politician
- Christopher Simonsen Fougner (1795–1869) a politician, Mayor of Hole from 1840 to 1848
- Morten Ludvig Sundt (1809–1891) a farmer and politician, Mayor of Hole from 1850 to 1866
- Jørgen Moe (1813–1882) a folklorist, poet, author and Bishop of the Diocese of Kristianssand from 1874
- Anders Castus Svarstad (1869–1943) a painter of urban landscapes

=== Sport ===
- Gabriel Rasch (born 1976) a former road bicycle racer
- Tord Asle Gjerdalen (born 1983) a cross-country skier
- Kenneth Di Vita Jensen (born 1990) a soccer player with over 100 club caps

== Twin towns — sister cities ==
The following cities are twinned with Hole:

- Faaborg-Midtfyn, Denmark
- Hólmavík, Iceland
- Kustavi, Finland
- Tanum, Sweden
