= Tyrifjorden =

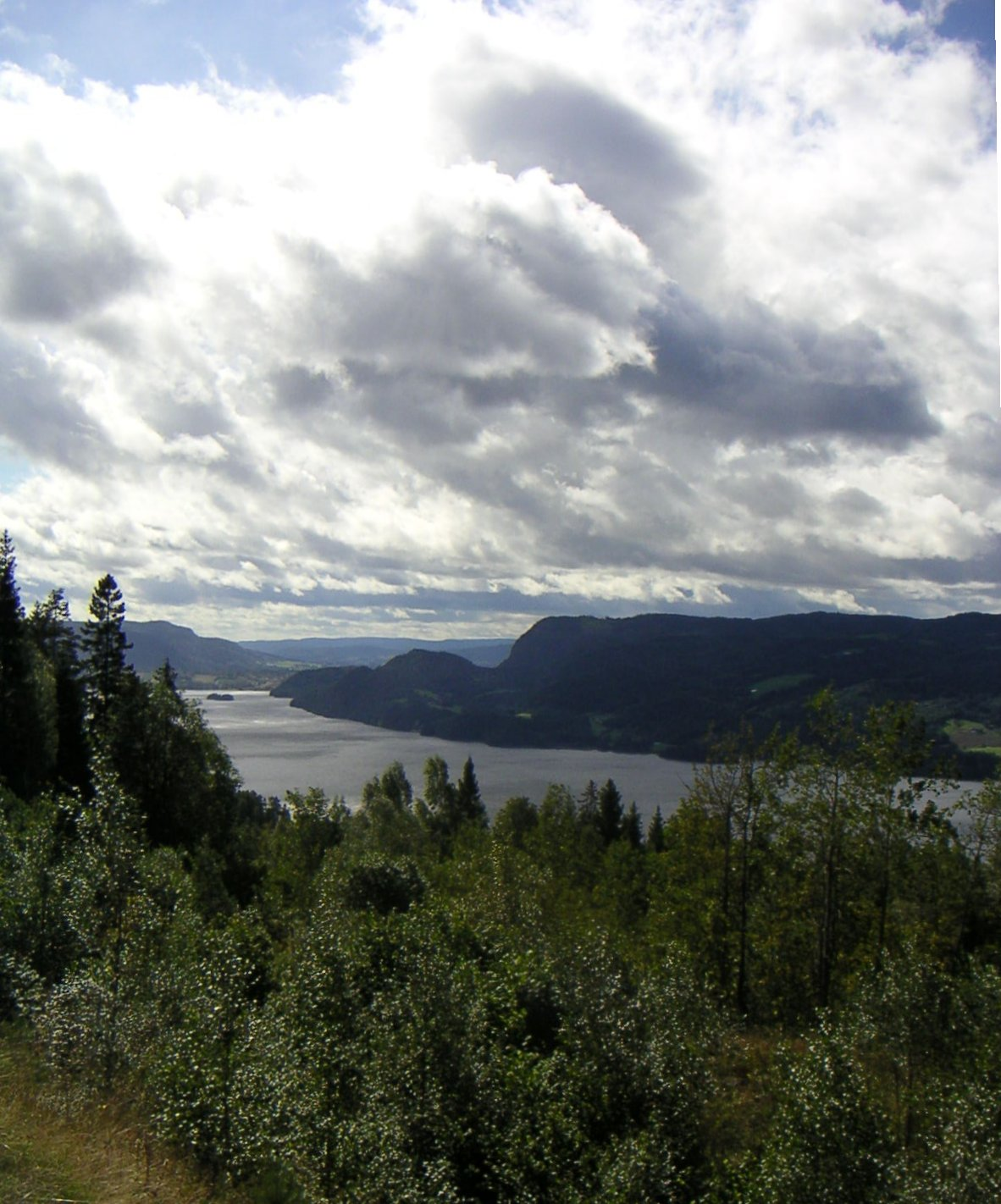

- Location of Tyrifjorden in Buskerud Tyrifjorden (Norway)
- Location: Buskerud, Norway
- Coordinates: 60°2′N 10°8′E
- Type: fjord lake
- Primary inflows: Begna, Henåa, Skjærdalselva, Sogna and Storelva
- Primary outflows: Drammenselva
- Catchment area: 9,898.81 km^{2} (3,821.95 sq mi)
- Basin countries: Norway
- Max. length: 26 km (16 mi)
- Max. width: 10 km (6.2 mi)
- Surface area: 138.56 km^{2} (53.50 sq mi)
- Average depth: 95 m (312 ft)
- Max. depth: 295 m (968 ft)
- Water volume: 13.13 km^{3} (3.15 cu mi)
- Shore length^{1}: 171.81 km (106.76 mi)
- Surface elevation: 63 m (207 ft)
- Islands: Frognøya, Storøya, Utøya
- Settlements: Hønefoss

Ramsar Wetland
- Official name: Nordre Tyrifjord Wetlands System
- Designated: 18 March 1996
- Reference no.: 802
- ^{1} Shore length is not a well-defined measure.

Tyrifjorden (Lake Tyri) is a lake in Norway. It lies 40 kilometres (25 mi) northwest of Oslo and is the nation's fifth largest lake with an area of 138.56 km^{2}. It has a volume of 13 km^{3}, is 295 meters deep at its deepest, and lies 63 meters above sea level. The lake's primary source is the Begna river, which discharges into Tyrifjorden at Hønefoss where the river forms the waterfall of Hønefossen. Its primary outlet is at Vikersund near the lake's southwest corner, where Tyrifjorden discharges into the Drammenselva river.

== Location ==
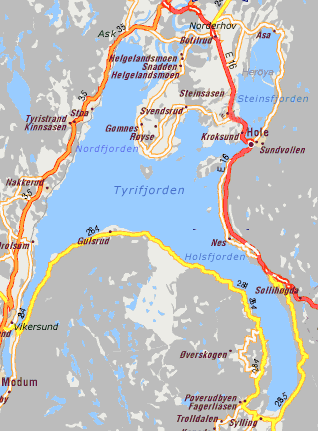
Tyrifjorden map

Tyrifjorden is located in the county of Buskerud and borders the municipalities of Hole, Lier, Modum, and Ringerike. Tyrifjorden is a landlocked fjord. It consists of a main body, Storfjorden, along with the Holsfjorden, Nordfjorden, and Steinsfjorden branches.

== Branches ==
- Nordfjorden – This is the northwestern arm of Tyrifjorden.
- Steinsfjorden – This is the northeastern arm of Tyrifjorden.
- Holsfjorden – This is the southeastern arm as well as being the longest and largest of the fjord branches.

== Islands ==
- Utøya – campsite for events
- Storøya – with a golf club
- Frognøya

== The name ==
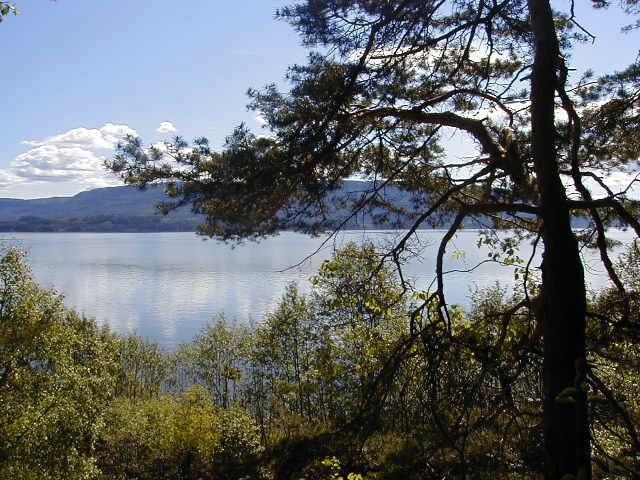
Tyrifjorden

The Old Norse form of the name was just Tyri (or Tyrvi). This uncompounded name is also the first element in the name Tyristrand. The name is derived from the word tyri meaning "old/dead pine (wood)", referring specifically to the woods of the western side of the lake. The last element -fjorden (the definite form of fjord) is a later addition.

== 2011 shooting massacre ==
On 22 July 2011, an island in the lake, Utøya, was the site of a shooting spree during a youth camp held by the Norwegian Labour Party.
