= Leveld Church =

Church in Buskerud, Norway

- Leveld kyrkje
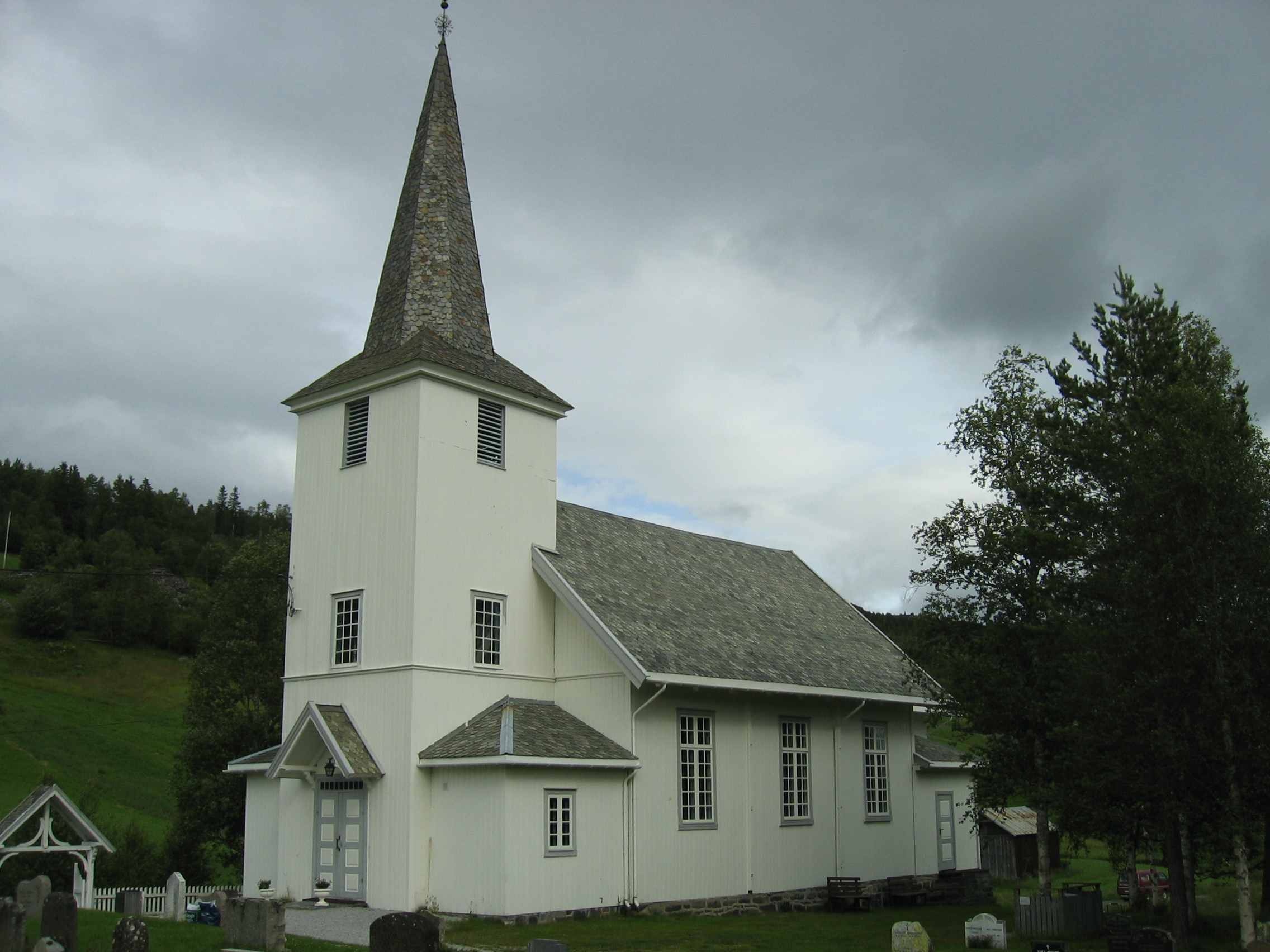
- View of the church
- Leveld Church
- 60°41′50″N 8°30′06″E
- Location: Ål Municipality, Buskerud
- Country: Norway
- Denomination: Church of Norway
- Churchmanship: Evangelical Lutheran

History
- Status: Parish church
- Founded: 1880
- Consecrated: Sept 1880

Architecture
- Functional status: Active
- Architect: C.F. von der Lippe
- Architectural type: Long church
- Completed: 1880 (146 years ago)

Specifications
- Capacity: 200
- Materials: Wood

Administration
- Diocese: Tunsberg
- Deanery: Hallingdal prosti
- Parish: Ål
- Norwegian Cultural Heritage Site
- Type: Church
- Status: Not protected
- ID: 84297

Leveld Church (Nynorsk: Leveld kyrkje) is a parish church of the Church of Norway in Ål Municipality in Buskerud county, Norway. It is located in the village of Leveld. It is one of the churches for the Ål parish which is part of the Hallingdal prosti (deanery) in the Diocese of Tunsberg. The white, wooden church was built in a long church design in 1880 using plans drawn up by the architect Conrad Fredrik von der Lippe. The church seats about 200 people.

== History ==
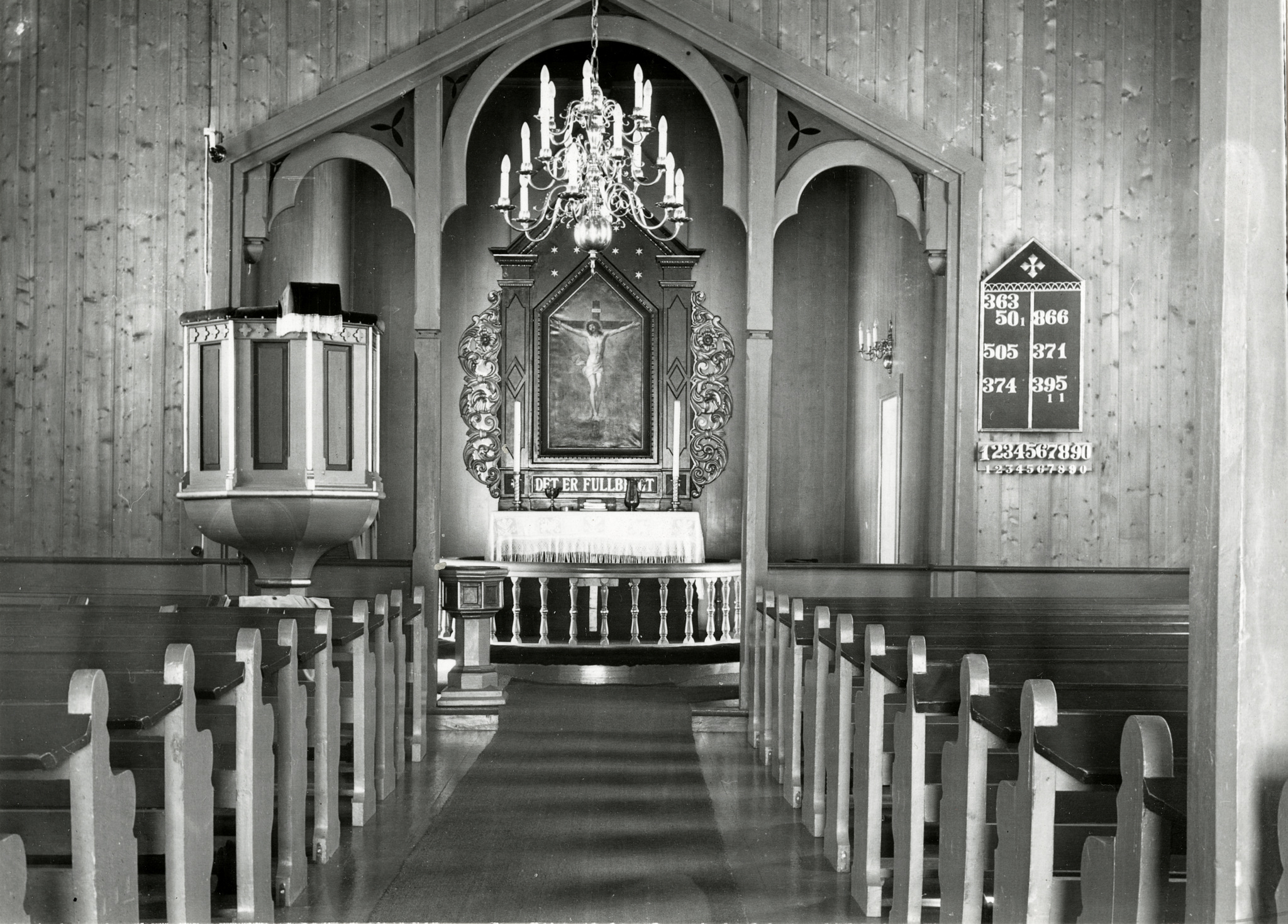
Interior view of the church

Historically, there were two old stave churches in Ål Municipality: Ål Stave Church and Torpo Stave Church. In 1880, both churches were closed and three new churches were built to replace the two old churches: Ål Church, Torpo Church, and Leveld Church. Andreas Keitel and his team led the building of the three churches which were all designed by Conrad Fredrik von der Lippe. In Ål and Torpo, old stave churches were replaced by new churches at the same sites, but in Leveld this was the first church in the area (although an auxiliary cemetery had been at the site since 1832).

The new Leveld Church was consecrated in September 1880. It is a long church built using log construction. There is a rectangular nave and a smaller rectangular choir in the east which is surrounded by sacristies. In 1976, some secondary rooms on each side of the west tower were built (designed by Elisabet Fidjestøl).

== See also ==
- List of churches in Tunsberg
