= Von der Lippe =

Norwegian patrician family

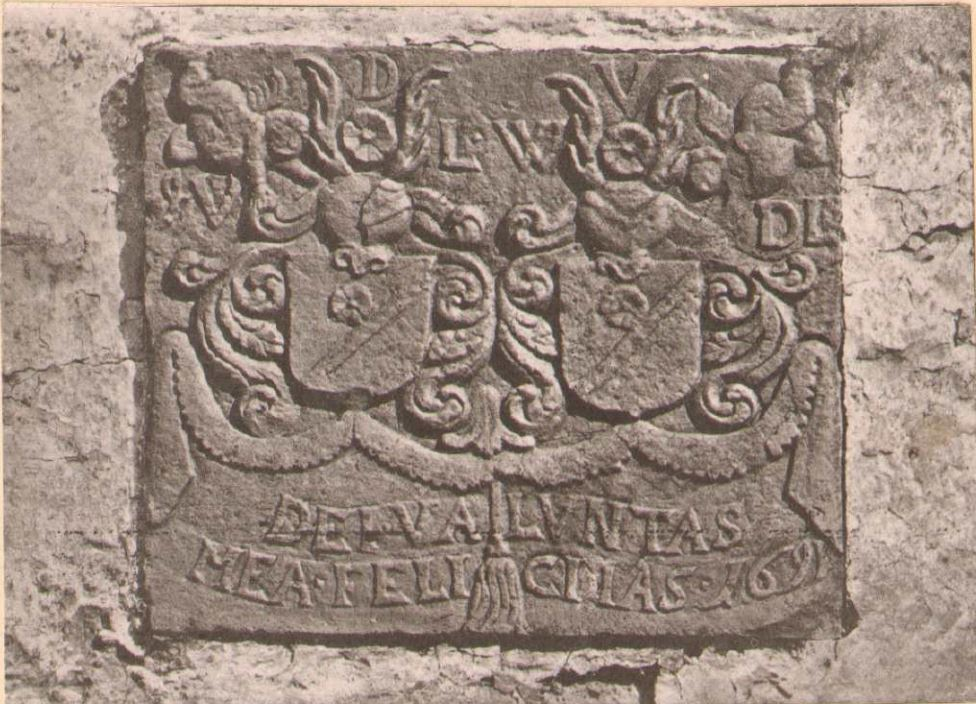
Coat of Arms of von der Lippe family in Norway

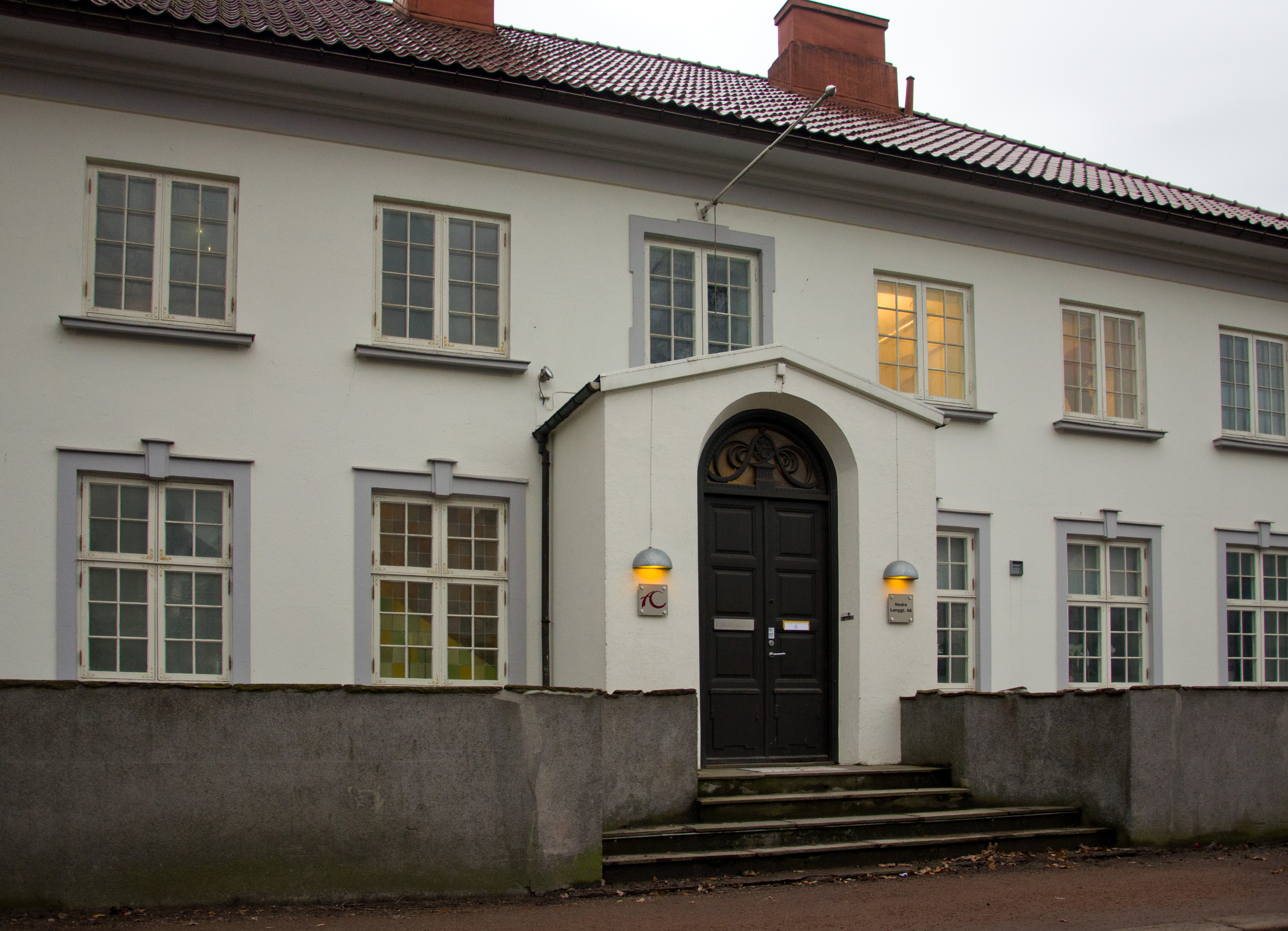
Villa von der Lippe, Tønsberg

The von der Lippe is a prominent Norwegian family of German origin, part of the historical Patriciate of Norway.

== History ==
In Norway, the name von der Lippe is most frequently associated with the descendants of Jacob von der Lippe (died 1702), who immigrated from Bremen, Germany and became a citizen of Bergen, Norway in 1655. In Bergen, family members were merchants and business people. Later, the family had clergy members and other officials, as well as theater people, and various other professions.

Within Scandinavian countries, there have been several members of von der Lippe family, without lines known between them.

== Notable members ==
- Jakob von der Lippe (1872–1953) Norwegian admiral
- Anneke von der Lippe (born 1964) Norwegian actress
- Frits von der Lippe (1901–1988) Norwegian journalist and theatre director
- Anton Barth von der Lippe (1886–1960) Norwegian whaler
- Conrad Fredrik von der Lippe (1833–1901) Norwegian architect
- Susan von der Lippe (born 1965) American Olympic Swimmer
- Tania Michelet (born von der Lippe, 1969), Norwegian author

== Literature ==
- Steffens, Haagen Krog (1911) Norske Slægter 1912 (Kristiania)
- Cappelen, Hans (1976) Norske slektsvåpen (Oslo 2nd ed.), p. 155
