= Just Lippe =

Norwegian journalist and politician

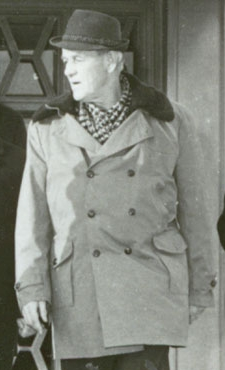
Just Lippe

Just Lippe (13 January 1904 – 24 March 1978) was a Norwegian journalist and politician for the Communist Party.

He was born in Bergen as the son of Jakob von der Lippe (1870–1954). He was related to the von der Lippes family (as follows): brothers Frits and Jens, brother-in-law Margrethe, grandson of Conrad Fredrik, great-grandson of Bishop Jacob and first cousin once removed of Admiral Jakob and whaler Anton.

He joined the Norwegian Labour Party in 1921, but joined the Communist Party when it split from Labour. In 1927 he was imprisoned (five weeks of detention, without conviction) together with Henry W. Kristiansen, Otto Luihn and Albin Eines, after a police raid in the party offices. He was a secretary in the Young Communist League of Norway from 1925 to 1929, and chaired the organization from 1927 to 1928. In 1928 he became an executive committee member of the Young Communist International. In 1929 he became a member of the Communist Party secretariat. In the early 1930s he headed the Scandinavian section of the International Lenin School in Moscow, before he was relocated to Vladivostok. He later returned to Norway. He was a central board member of the Communist Party from 1937 to 1945 and 1950 to 1972. From 1949 to 1963 he was the party secretary. During the Second World War, he fled to Sweden in 1941 to escape the German occupation of Norway. He was imprisoned in Sweden for a year and a half, and when released, he continued to the United Kingdom where he enrolled in the Norwegian military-in-exile.

He worked as a journalist in Arbeideren before the war, and in Friheten from 1947 to 1949. In 1963 he edited the official party history, Norges kommunistiske partis historie.

Party political offices
Preceded by Henry W. Kristiansen	Chairman of the Young Communist League of Norway; 1927–1928	Succeeded by
