= Jakob von der Lippe =

Norwegian admiral (1872–1953)

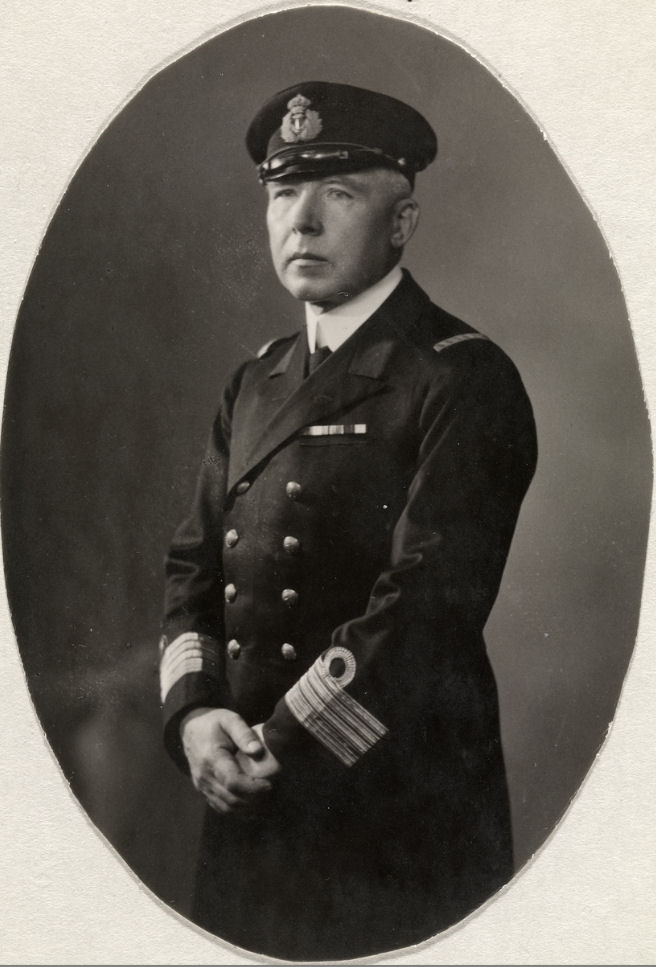
Image of Jakob von der Lippe

Jakob von der Lippe (28 July 1872 – 1953) was a Norwegian admiral.

He was born in Fjeld Municipality. He was a grandson of bishop Jacob von der Lippe and a son of dean Johan Nordahl Brun von der Lippe (1838–1915). Through his uncle Conrad Fredrik von der Lippe he was a first cousin once removed of Frits von der Lippe, Just Lippe and Jens von der Lippe. He had the same father, and was thus a half-brother, of Anton Barth von der Lippe.

On 13 October 1916 von der Lippe was made the first regular director of the Royal Norwegian Navy Air Service, after the service was permanently organized and sorted under the Royal Norwegian Navy's shooting and signals school, which von der Lippe was the head of. On 14 February the following year von der Lippe was relieved of his position at the shooting and signals school and made full-time commander of the Royal Norwegian Navy Air Service. He retained his command until 13 January 1930. He reached the rank of rear admiral in 1930, and served as the Commanding Admiral of Norway from 1930 to August 1934. He was also the Chief of the Admiral Staff from 1930 to 1933.

Military offices
Preceded by Alfred Berglund	Commanding Admiral in Norway; 1930–1934	Succeeded by Edgar Otto
