= Anton Barth von der Lippe =

Anton Barth von der Lippe (8 October 1886 – 1960) was a Norwegian whaler.

He was born in Tjøme Municipality as a son of dean Johan Nordahl Brun von der Lippe (1838–1915) and his third wife. His father's second wife had the son Jakob von der Lippe, who was Anton's half-brother. Anton was also a grandson of bishop Jacob von der Lippe, nephew of Conrad Fredrik von der Lippe and first cousin once removed of Frits von der Lippe, Just Lippe and Jens von der Lippe.

He established his own shipping company in 1915, and was particularly engaged in whaling. Between 1919 and 1945 he cooperated closely with Svend Foyn Bruun. Lippe, Bruun and Anders Jahre together founded the three whaling companies Antarctic, Globus and Kosmos in 1928. He died in 1960.
