= Vigrid (disambiguation) =

Vígríðr or Vigrid may refer to

Norse mythology

- Vígríðr, a large field foretold to host a battle between the forces of the gods and the forces of Surtr as part of the events of Ragnarök.

Political organizations

- Vigrid (Norway), neo-pagan and neo-Nazi organization in Norway.

Ships

- SS Vigrid, a Norwegian cargo ship in service 1915–17.
