= Edgar Otto =

Norwegian admiral

Edgar Otto (1873–1952) was a Norwegian admiral.

He was born in Horten. He was a naval officer from 1894, and reached the ranks of Premier Lieutenant in 1897, Captain in 1901, Captain Commander in 1915, Commander in 1929 and Rear Admiral in 1934. In the Admiral Staff he was a member from 1911 to 1915, chief of staff from 1919 to 1925 and 1930 to 1933, and Chief from 1933 to 1934. From 1934 to 1938 he served as the Commanding Admiral in Norway.

Military offices
Preceded by Jakob von der Lippe	Commanding Admiral in Norway; 1934–1938	Succeeded by Henry Diesen
