= Ål Church (Buskerud) =

Church in Buskerud, Norway

- Ål kyrkje
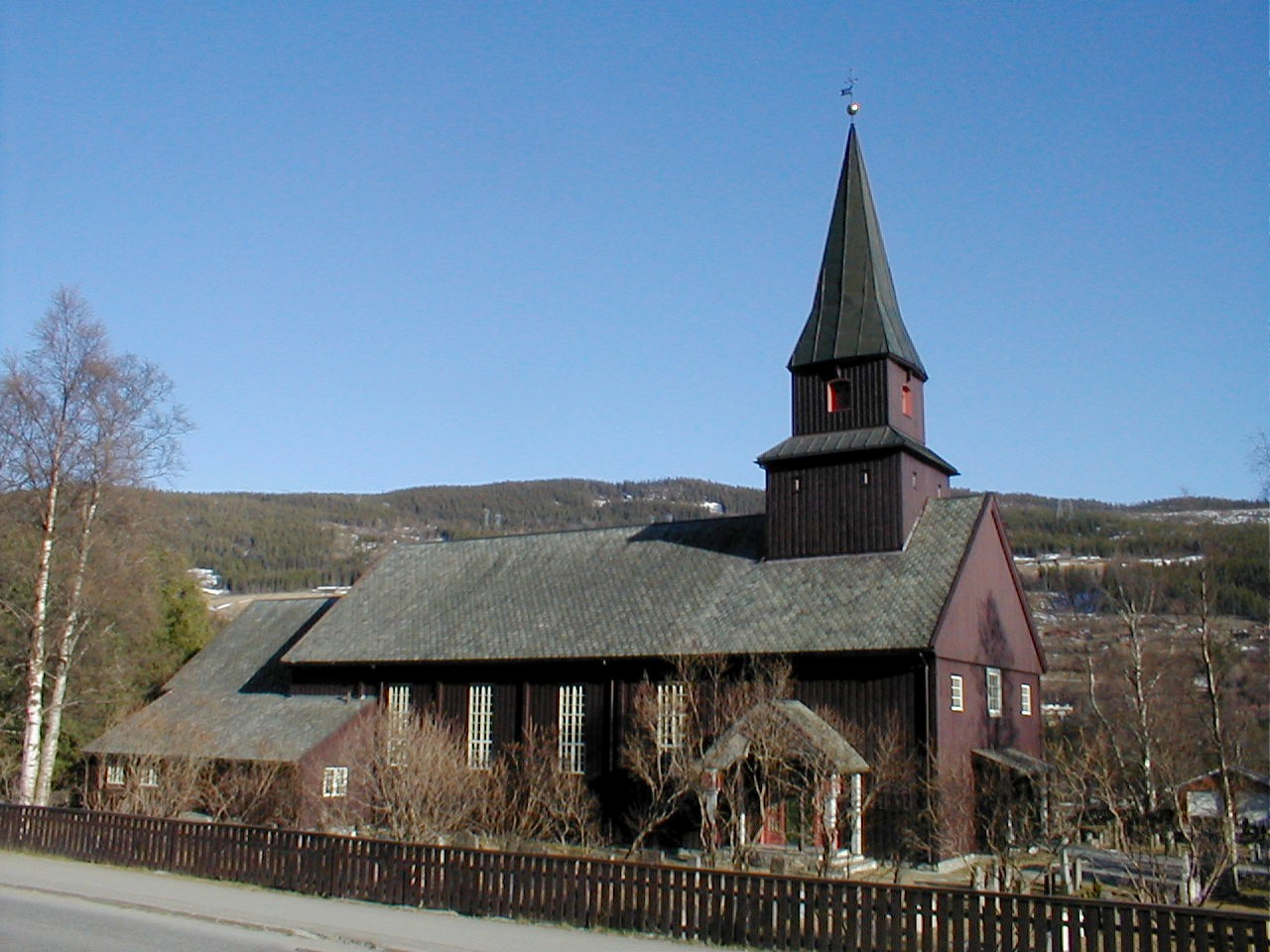
- View of the church
- Ål Church
- 60°37′45″N 8°33′30″E
- Location: Ål Municipality, Buskerud
- Country: Norway
- Denomination: Church of Norway
- Previous denomination: Catholic Church
- Churchmanship: Evangelical Lutheran

History
- Status: Parish church
- Founded: 12th century
- Consecrated: 29 Sept 1880

Architecture
- Functional status: Active
- Architect: C.F. von der Lippe
- Architectural type: Long church
- Completed: 1880 (146 years ago)

Specifications
- Capacity: 300
- Materials: Wood

Administration
- Diocese: Tunsberg
- Deanery: Hallingdal prosti
- Parish: Ål
- Norwegian Cultural Heritage Site
- Type: Church
- Status: Listed
- ID: 85956

Ål Church (Norwegian: Ål kyrkje) is a parish church of the Church of Norway in Ål Municipality in Buskerud county, Norway. It is located in the village of Ål. It is one of the churches for the Ål parish which is part of the Hallingdal prosti (deanery) in the Diocese of Tunsberg. The white, wooden church was built in a long church design in 1880 using plans drawn up by the architect Conrad Fredrik von der Lippe. The church seats about 300 people.

The previous building on the site, Ål Stave Church, is among the most famous of the stave churches that have been demolished. This is due not least to the west portal and the ceiling decorations, which can be studied at the Museum of Cultural History in Oslo. A section of the ceiling was also reproduced on Norwegian stamps in 1975.

== History ==
The earliest existing historical records of the church date back to the year 1402, but the church was not built that year. The first church in Ål was a wooden stave church that was probably built between the years 1150 and 1200. The church was located on a site about 300 metres (980 ft) west of the site of the present-day church. The building originally consisted of a nave and a narrower choir, probably with an apse in the east, and the church was surrounded by an open-air porch. In the 13th century, the choir was replaced with a new and larger choir with the same width as the nave and about 6.5 metres (21 ft) long. This choir had a barrel vault ceiling with painted decorations. At the same time, the church received transepts approximately in the middle of the nave giving the church a cruciform design.

The church was given a sacristy north of the choir in 1688. In 1699 the choir received an apse in the east. The altar was then placed in the apse, while the rest of the choir served as an extension of the nave. The church, like most other churches in Norway, was sold into private ownership during the Norwegian church sale in 1723 to help the King pay off war debts. The stave church was purchased by parish priest Jacob Stockfleth. Early in the 19th century, the nave was expanded by moving the long walls outwards so that they were flush with the ridges of the transepts, giving the building a long church design.

In 1814, this church served as an election church (Norwegian: valgkirke). Together with more than 300 other parish churches across Norway, it was a polling station for elections to the 1814 Norwegian Constituent Assembly which wrote the Constitution of Norway. This was Norway's first national election. Each church parish was a constituency that elected people called "electors" who later met together in each county to elect the representatives for the assembly that was to meet at Eidsvoll Manor later that year.

The church had been in private ownership from 1723 until 1856 when it was given to the municipality. After the municipality took over the ownership and upkeep of the building, it was determined that the building was not in great shape and it needed to be replaced. In the 1870s, a new church was planned, and the Society for the Preservation of Ancient Norwegian Monuments was offered to buy the stave church for 600 kr, but due to costs and the buildings lack of historical value because of all the renovations over they years, the building was not sold and in the summer of 1880, it was demolished. Some of the materials from the old building were reused in the new church. When it was demolished in 1880, only the westernmost part of the original nave remained. During the demolition, some of the medieval parts were sent to the Oldsaksamlingen at the University of Oslo.

The new church was built by Andreas Keitel based on Conrad Fredrik von der Lippe's drawings for Nedstrand Church. The new church was consecrated on 29 September 1880. It is a long church built out of log construction. The nave and choir are both rectangular and there were sacristies on the north and south side of the choir. In 1959, the church was significantly rebuilt according to plans by Frederik Konow Lund. The building was extended to the east and west. The extension to the west has the same width as the nave and surrounds the tower. In the east, the choir was extended and made wider. To the east of the church in the north is an extension with a sacristy, meeting room, and auxiliary room.

== Media gallery ==
Interior view of the church

The old stave church in Ål

== See also ==
- List of churches in Tunsberg
