= SS Vigrid =

Norwegian steam ship built in 1915

History

Norway
- Name: Vigrid
- Namesake: Vígríðr - the large field foretold to host a battle between the forces of the Norse gods and the forces of the jötunn Surtr as part of the events of Ragnarök.
- Owner: Anton Barth von der Lippe (1915–1917); D/S A/S Vigrid (1917)
- Port of registry: Tønsberg (1915–1917); Bergen (1917)
- Builder: Bergens Mekaniske Verksted in Bergen, Norway
- Yard number: 191
- Launched: 29 October 1915
- Identification: Code letters: MLRT
- Fate: Torpedoed and sunk on 31 December 1917

General characteristics
- Type: Cargo ship
- Tonnage: 1,617 GRT; 951 NRT
- Length: 74.5 m (244 ft 5 in)
- Beam: 11.5 m (37 ft 9 in)
- Draught: 4.8 m (15.8 ft)
- Installed power: 885 ihp (660 kW)
- Propulsion: Triple-expansion steam engine

SS Vigrid was a Norwegian steam-powered cargo ship built in 1915. Sailing during the First World War, she was torpedoed and sunk without warning by a German U-boat on 31 December 1917.

== Construction ==
A 1,617-gross register ton (GRT), 951-net register ton (NRT) vessel, she was built by the shipyard Bergens Mekaniske Verksted in the Western Norwegian port city of Bergen. Having yard number 191, she was launched on 29 October 1915 and completed the next month. Vigrid was powered by a single triple-expansion 885-indicated-horsepower (660 kW) steam turbine engine. She measured 74.5 metres (244 ft 5 in) between perpendiculars, with a beam of 11.5 metres (37 ft 9 in) and a draught of 4.8 metres (15.8 ft). After completion she was assigned the code letters MLRT.

== First World War ==
Vigrid sailed during the First World War, with H. M. Jensen as her captain. She belonged to the company of ship-broker Anton Barth von der Lippe in the port city Tønsberg, until she was bought by ship-broker Johan Waage's company D/S A/S Vigrid of Bergen in August 1917. (Note: Anton Barth von der Lippe would later acquire another ship of the same name, MS Vigrid. She was built by the German shipyard Deutsche Werft in Hamburg as MS Titania, before being bought by the shipping company Bruun & von der Lippes Rederi in 1937 and renamed Vigrid. She was sold later in 1937, and sunk as part of the Second World War convoy HX 133 in 1941.)

Although Norway remained officially neutral throughout the First World War, her large fleet of merchant ships, over 2,000 strong, served a vital role in keeping the United Kingdom with supplies. The Norwegian merchant navy suffered heavy losses to German U-boats during the war, losing close to half its ships, with an official death toll of 1,892 sailors.

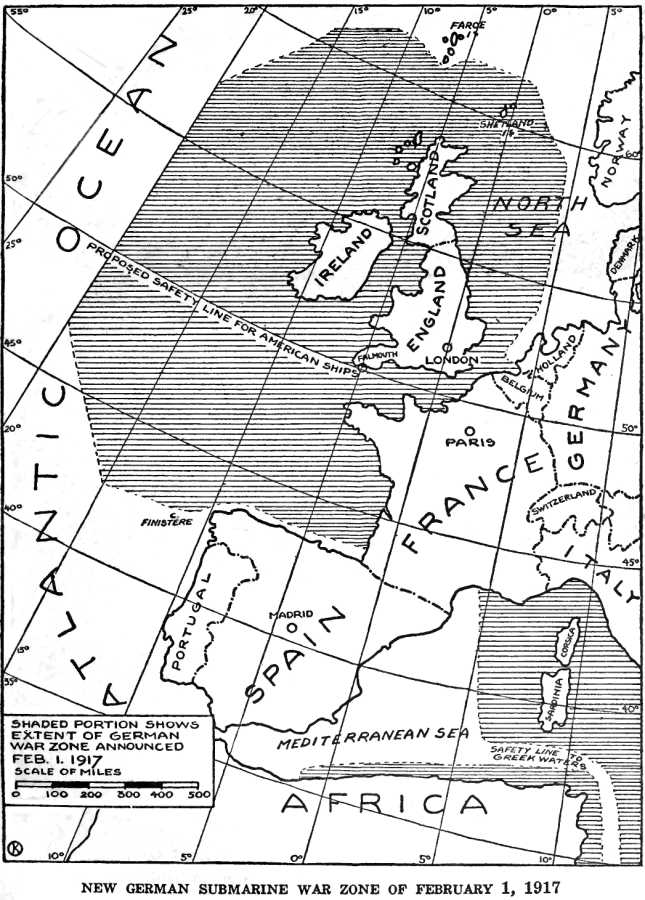
The shaded areas show the unrestricted submarine warfare zone announced by Germany on 1 February 1917. Vigrid was sunk in the English Channel, well within the zone.

=== Sinking ===
On 31 December 1917 she was attacked and torpedoed without warning by the German U-boat U-95, commanded by Kapitänleutnant Athalwin Prinz. U-95 belonged to the German 4th U-boat Flotilla. Vigrid sank in the English Channel some 10 nautical miles (19 km; 12 mi) west-north-west of Rundelstone Buoy, at 50°03′N 05°55′W. At the time of her sinking, she was en route from the port of Barry in Wales to Rouen in France with a cargo of 2,102 tons of coal. Five members of the crew were lost, while the captain and thirteen other crewmen survived the loss of the ship and landed at Penzance in Cornwall. Three of the sailors lost on Vigrid were Swedish citizens, the other two Norwegians.

=== Aftermath ===
On 16 January 1918, 16 days after sinking Vigrid, U-95 was lost with all 36 crew members to unknown causes near Hardelot in France. Before being lost, U-95 had managed to sink a total of 14 ships and damage another three vessels during the course of the six patrols she carried out in her career.

== Bibliography ==
- Derry, T.K. (1952). Butler, J.R.M (ed.). The campaign in Norway. History of the Second World War: Campaigns Series (1st ed.). London: Her Majesty's Stationery Office.
- Hermansen, Max, ed. (2008). Hardt Styrbord: Glimt fra norsk sjøkrigshistorie (in Norwegian). Oslo: Sjømilitære Samfunds forlag. ISBN 978-82-997703-0-9.
