= Torpo Church =

Church in Buskerud, Norway

- Torpo kyrkje
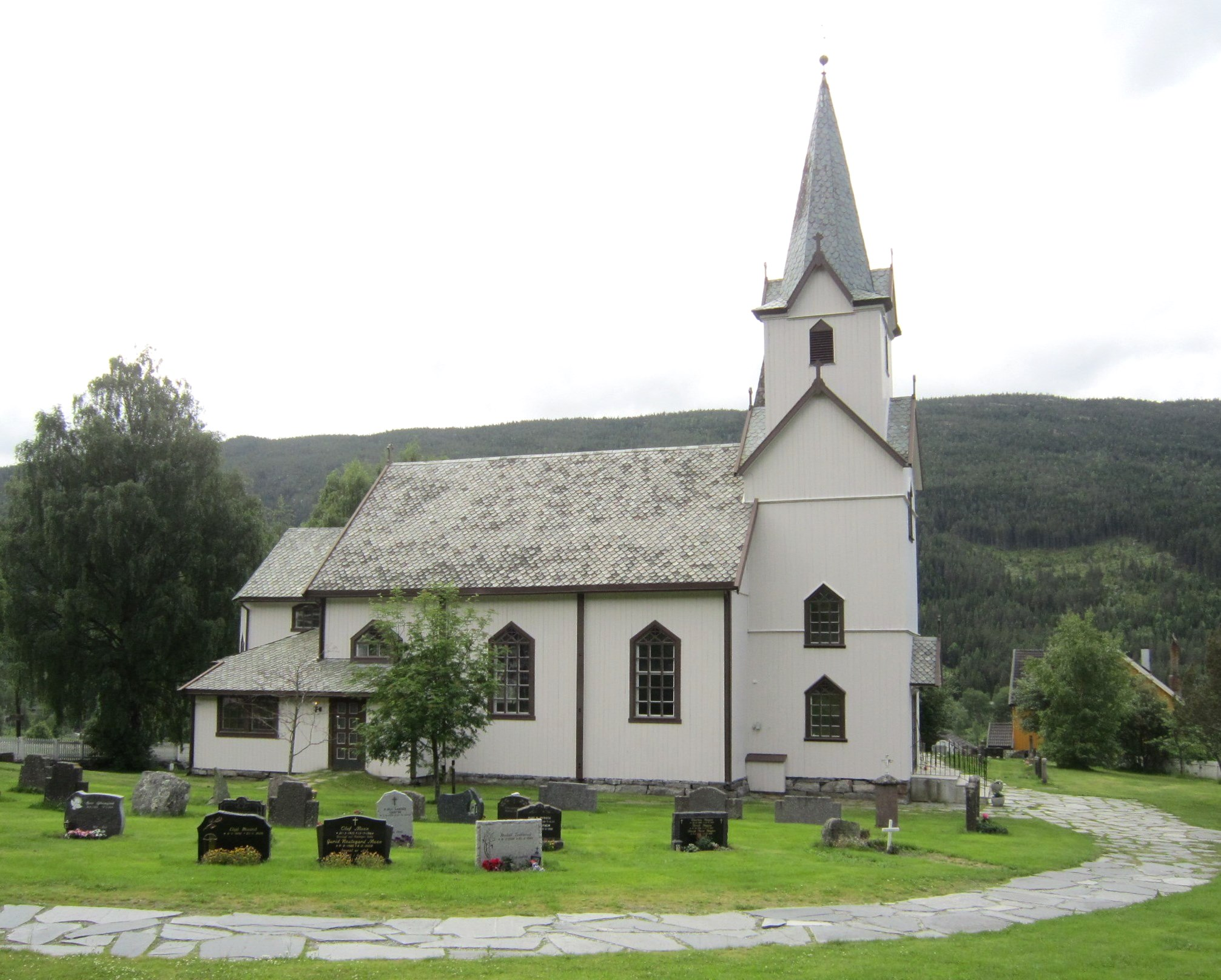
- View of the church
- Torpo Church
- 60°39′51″N 8°42′29″E
- Location: Ål Municipality, Buskerud
- Country: Norway
- Denomination: Church of Norway
- Churchmanship: Evangelical Lutheran

History
- Status: Parish church
- Founded: 1880
- Consecrated: 1 Oct 1880

Architecture
- Functional status: Active
- Architect: C.F. von der Lippe
- Architectural type: Long church
- Completed: 1880 (146 years ago)

Specifications
- Capacity: 200
- Materials: Wood

Administration
- Diocese: Tunsberg
- Deanery: Hallingdal prosti
- Parish: Ål

Torpo Church (Norwegian: Torpo kyrkje) is a parish church of the Church of Norway in Ål Municipality in Buskerud county, Norway. It is located in the village of Torpo. It is one of the churches for the Ål parish which is part of the Hallingdal prosti (deanery) in the Diocese of Tunsberg. The white, wooden church was built in a long church design in 1880 using plans drawn up by the architect Conrad Fredrik von der Lippe. The church seats about 200 people.

== History ==
For centuries, the Torpo Stave Church had served the population of the Torpo area. When the old stave church in Torpo was sold to the municipality in 1875, it did not take long before it was decided to either fix up the old church or replace it. Plans for reconstruction and expansion were shelved after protests from the Society for the Preservation of Ancient Norwegian Monuments. It was finally decided to build a new Torpo Church just to the north of the old stave church. The new church was built by builder Andreas Keitel based on Conrad Fredrik von der Lippe's drawings for Nedstrand Church. The new church was consecrated on 1 October 1880.

Torpo Church is a long church built using log construction. It has a west tower and the choir in the east is considerably narrower than the nave, but has the same wall height on the sides. The choir is surrounded by sacristies to the north and south. In the 1960s, architect Frederik Konow Lund prepared plans for rebuilding the church, but instead it ended up being restored according to plans by Peter Helland-Hansen in 1974. At that time, the baptismal sacristy on the north side was expanded, so that the extension now extends around the corner of the nave.

== Media gallery ==
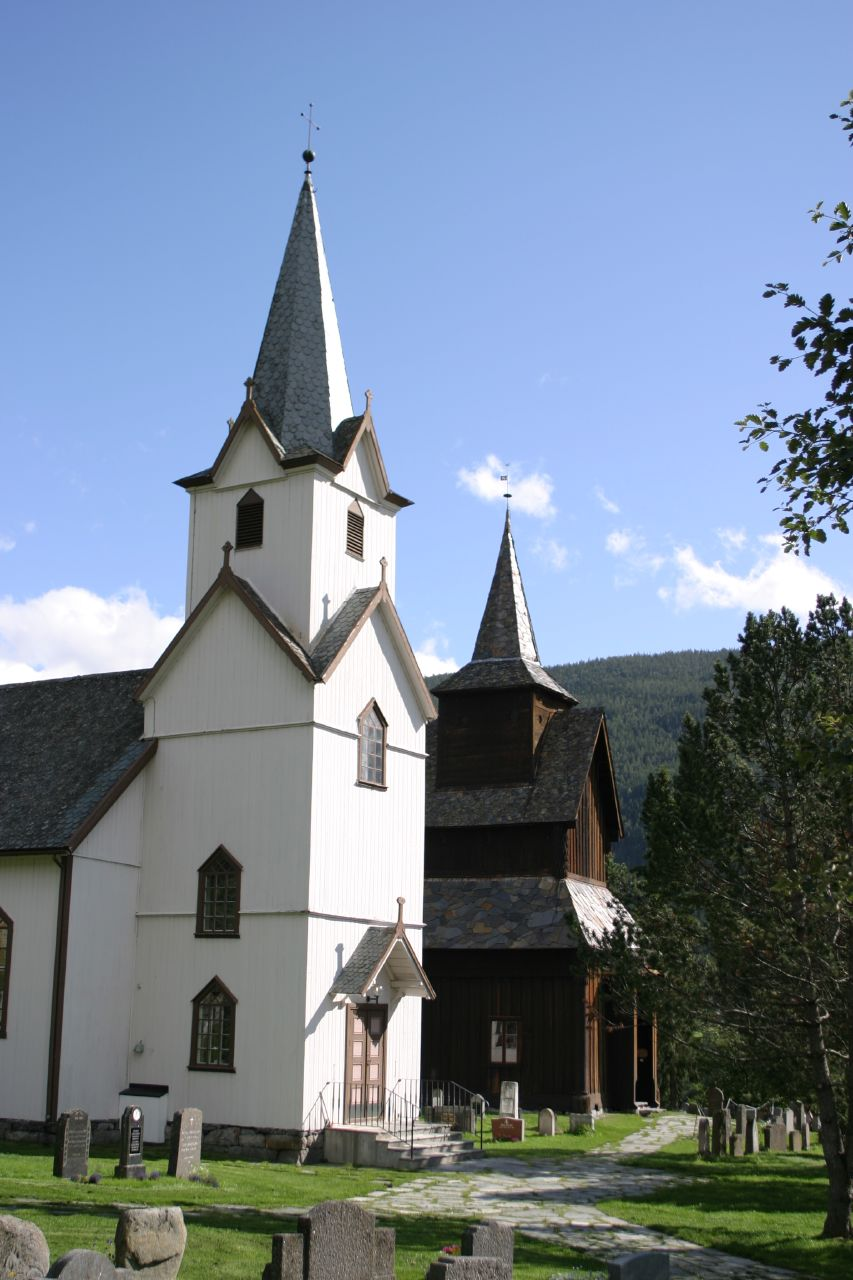

== See also ==
- List of churches in Tunsberg
