= Ole Bull Museum Lysøen =

Museum in Bjørnafjorden, Norway

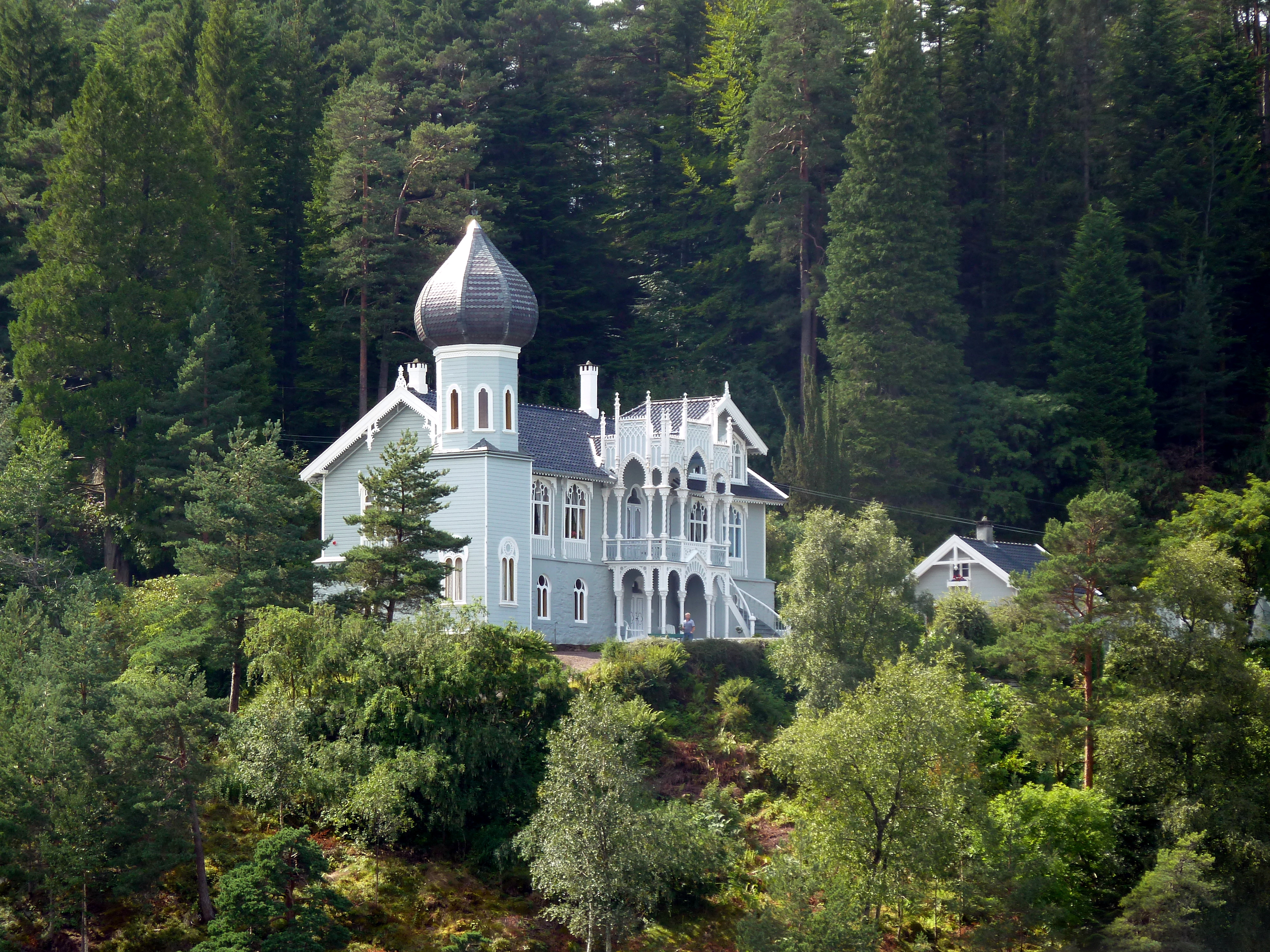
- Location: Lysøya, Bjørnafjorden Municipality, Norway
- Coordinates: 60.211095°N 5.368580°E
- Owner: Society for the Preservation of Ancient Norwegian Monuments
- Website: Official website

The Ole Bull Museum Lysøen is a museum on the island of Lysøya in Bjørnafjorden Municipality in Vestland county, Norway. The entire island is owned by the Society for the Preservation of Ancient Norwegian Monuments and operated as a museum that is open to the public. It is part of the KODE culture and music museum network. The museum (and island) is only accessible by a ferry from the village of Søvik located less than 1 kilometre (0.62 mi) to the east. The main attraction at the museum is Villa Lysøen (Ole Bulls villa på Lysøen), the home of Norwegian violin-virtuoso and composer Ole Bull until his death in 1880. The museum closed for extensive renovations and restoration work in 2025.

== History ==
The island was bought by Ole Bull in 1872 who constructed the villa. Ole Bull drew the plans for the villa himself, under the supervision of renowned Norwegian architect Conrad Fredrik von der Lippe (1833–1901). Ole Bull had a large villa built on the island, inspired by numerous architectural styles, including the Swiss chalet style and Moorish architecture. It has a tower formed as an onion dome, common in Russian architecture, and many wooden carvings.

Ole Bull transformed his 175-acre (0.71 km^{2}) island property into a fairy-tale kingdom by having romantic paths, ponds and gazebos made by planting exotic trees and bushes in the native pine forest. The island has 13 kilometres (8.1 mi) of walkways and paths. His second wife Sara Chapman Thorp (1850–1911) accompanied him to their summer villa at Lysøen.

The highest point on the island, 76 metres (249 ft) above sea level, is the site of a lookout tower which was built in 1903 by Ole Bull's American descendants. In 1974, Bull's granddaughter Sylvea Bull Curtis of Connecticut donated the island to the Society for the Preservation of Ancient Norwegian Monuments. Lysøen was granted status as a museum in 1984 and has since been open to the public. Guided tours are conducted from early May to August. The villa serves as a museum in the summer and is used for concerts during the annual Bergen International Festival.

=== Media gallery ===
Ole Bull's Villa Lysøen

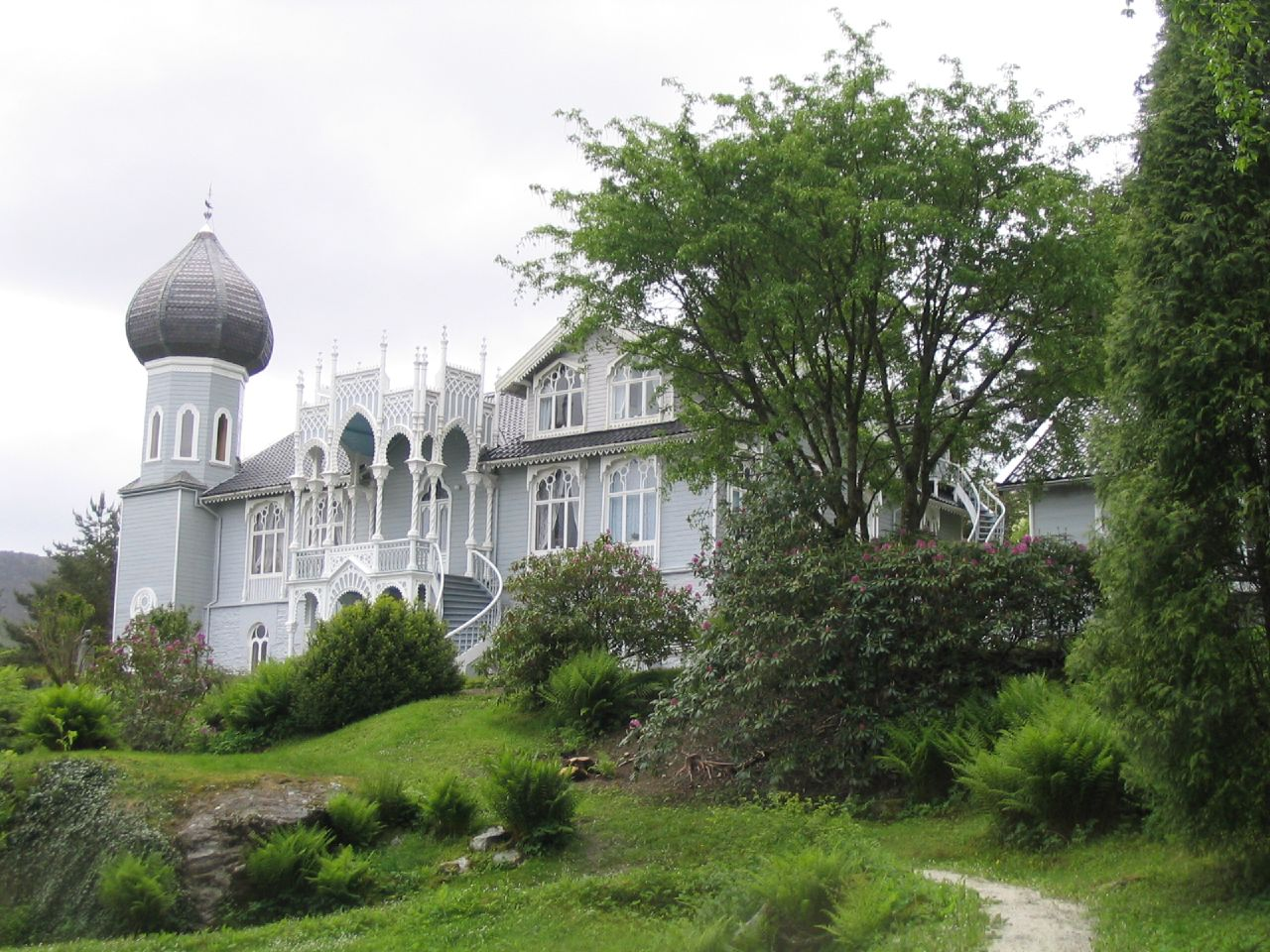

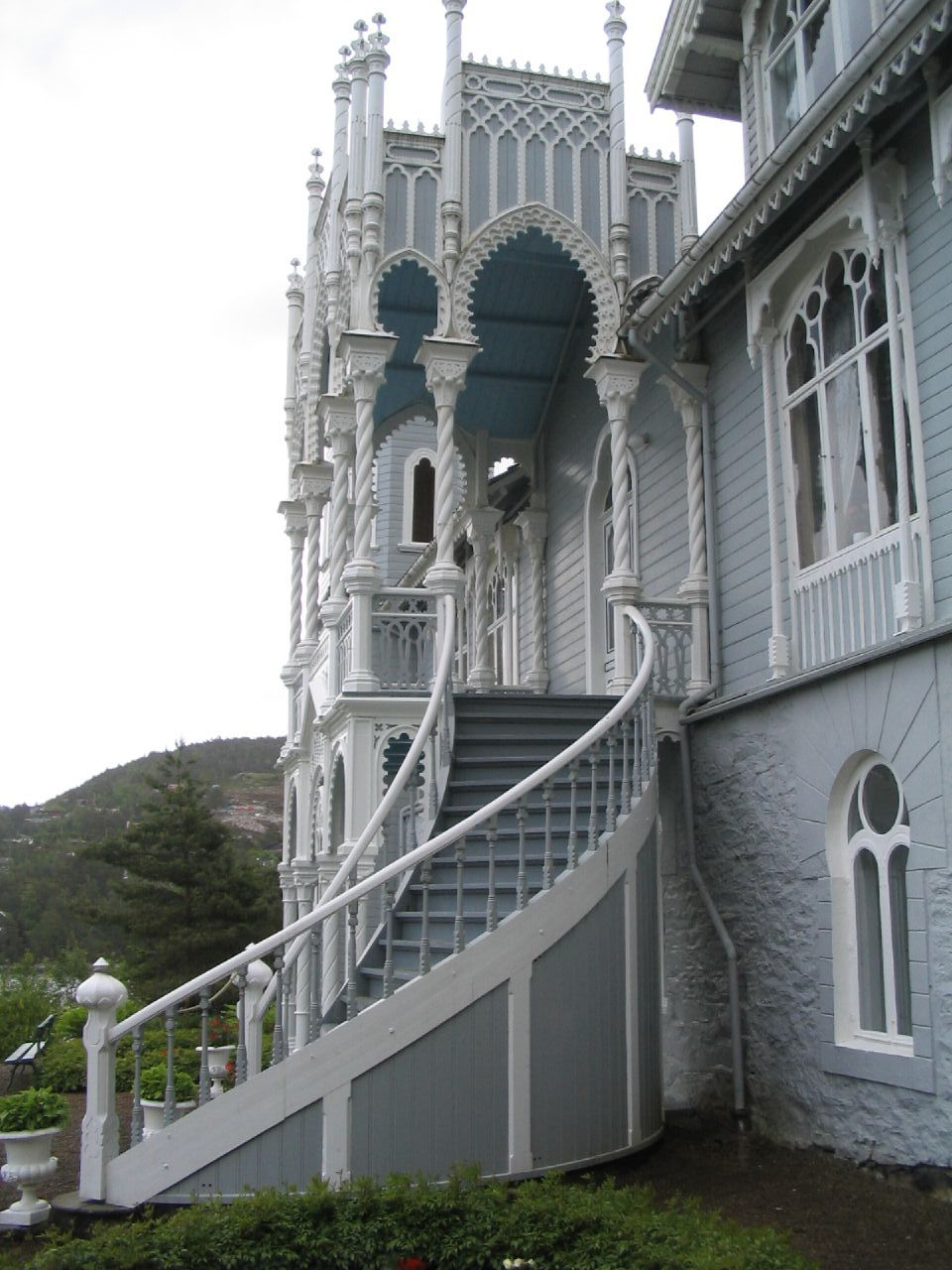

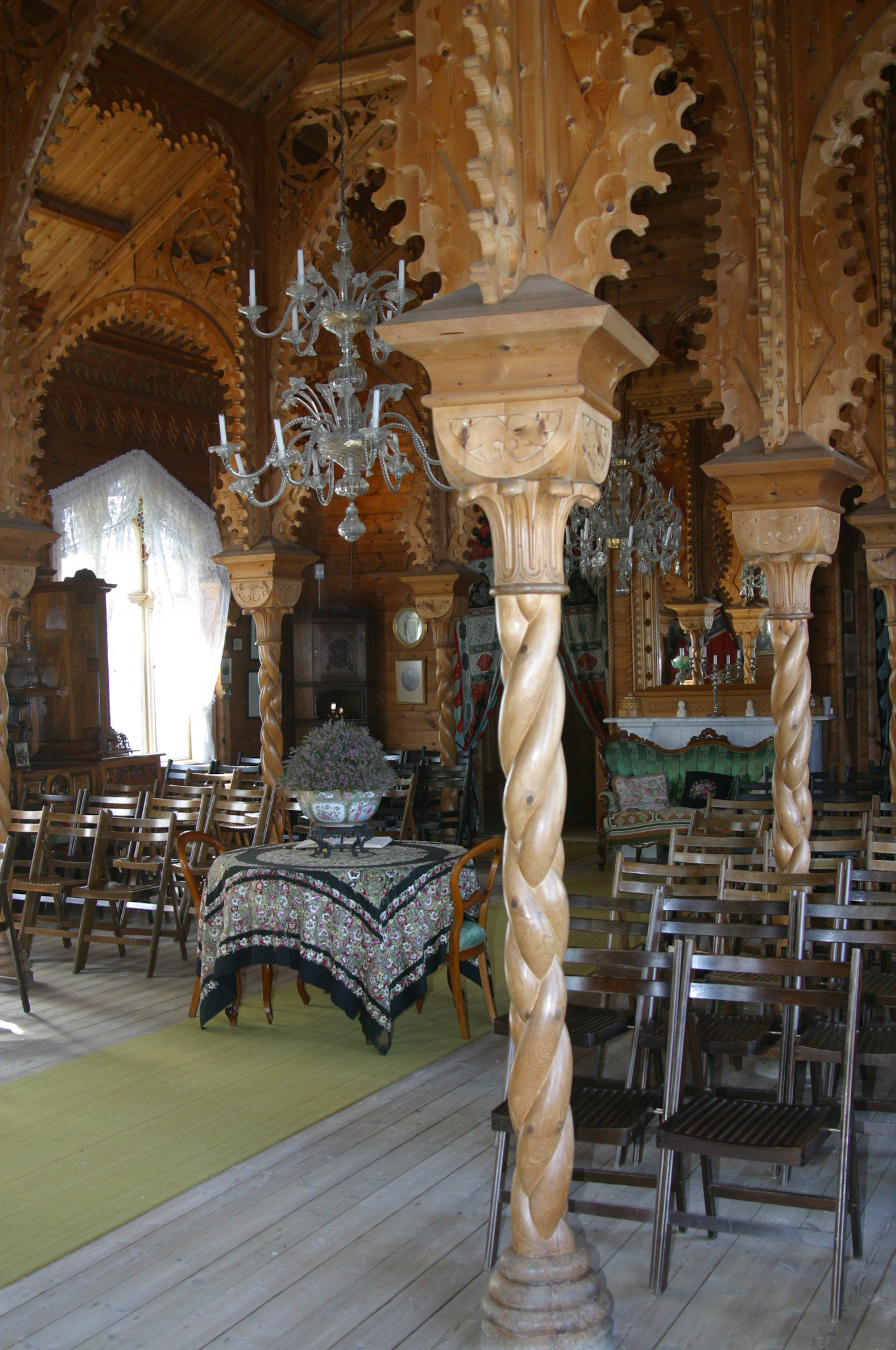

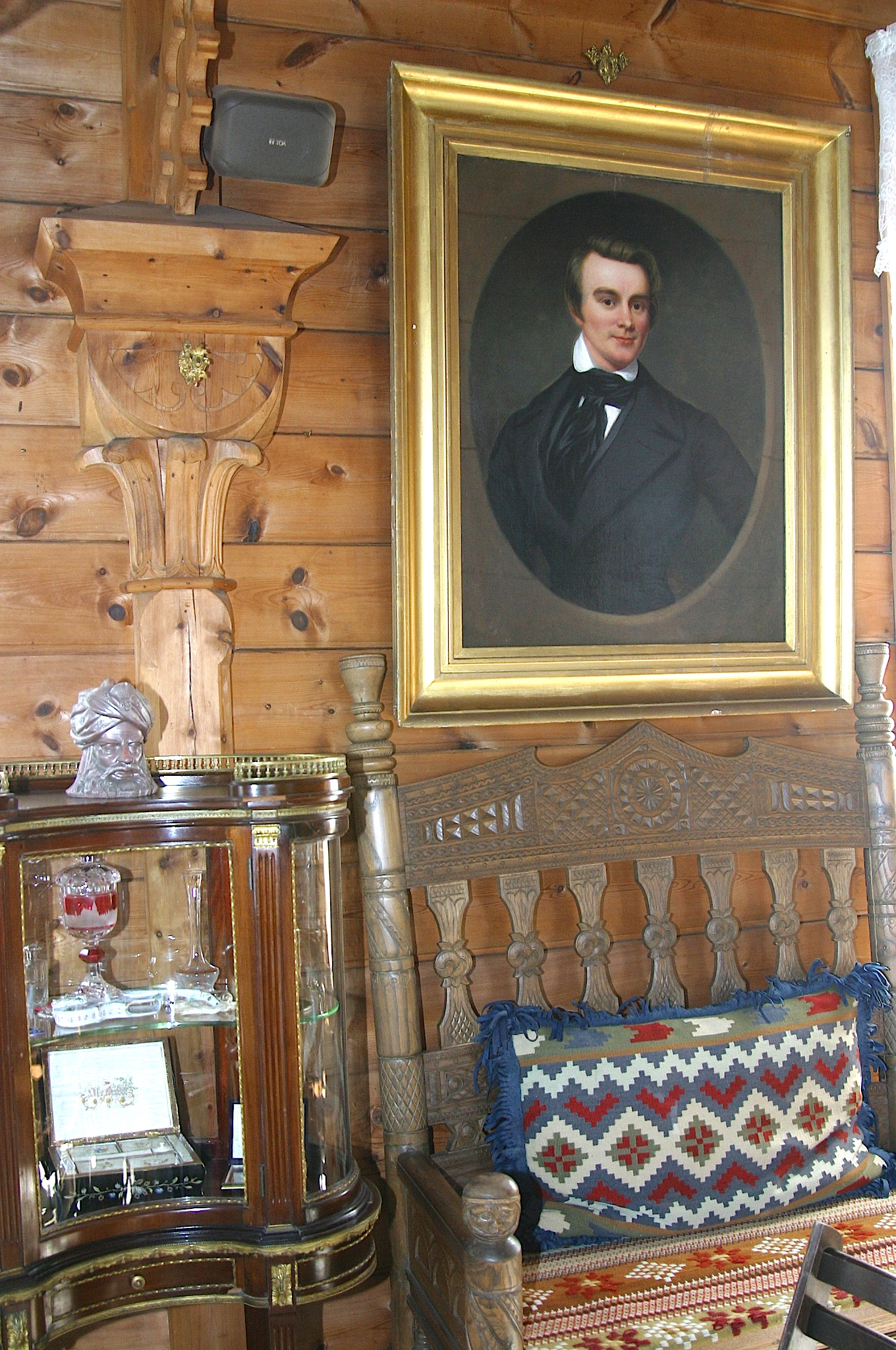

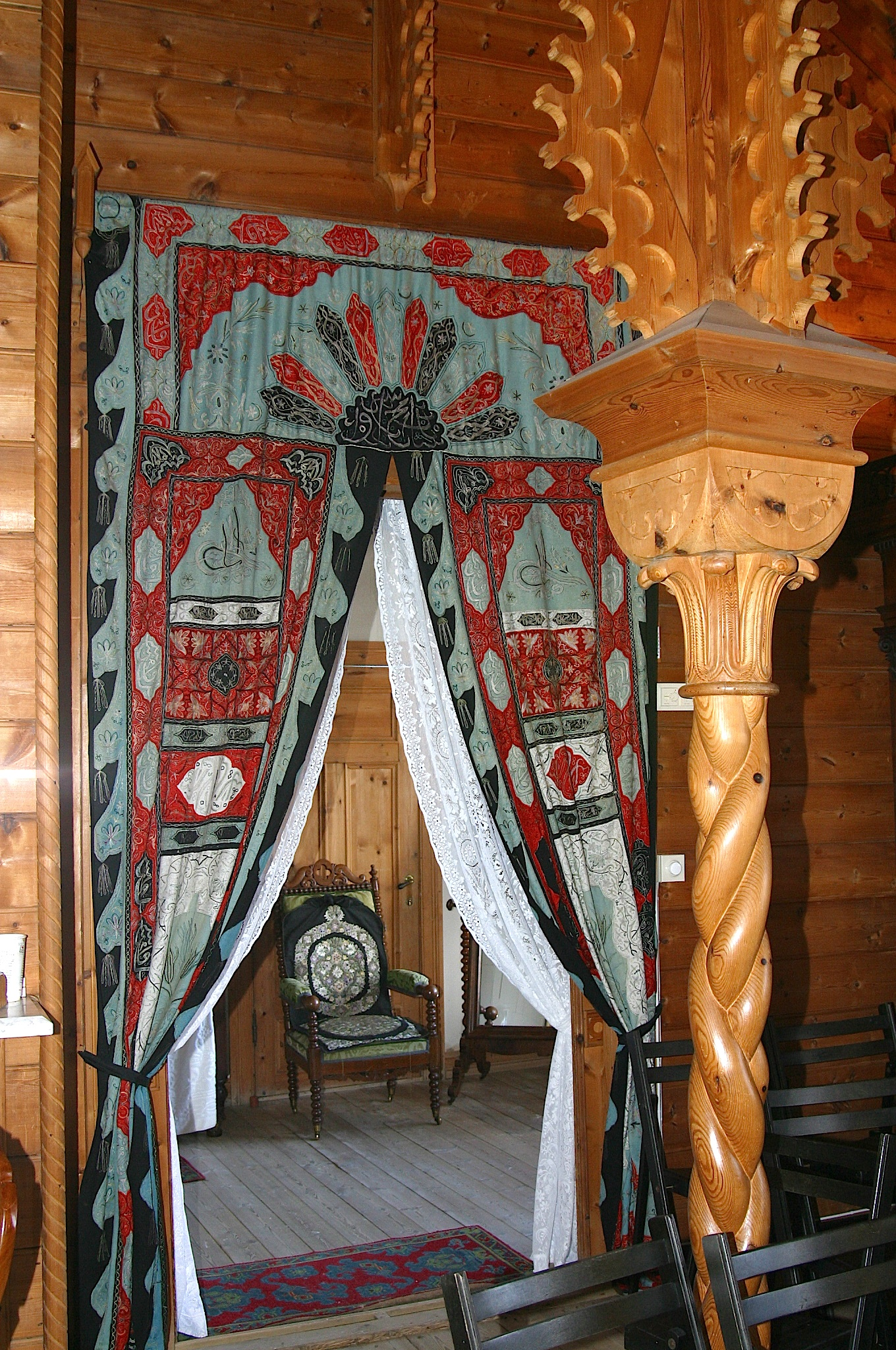

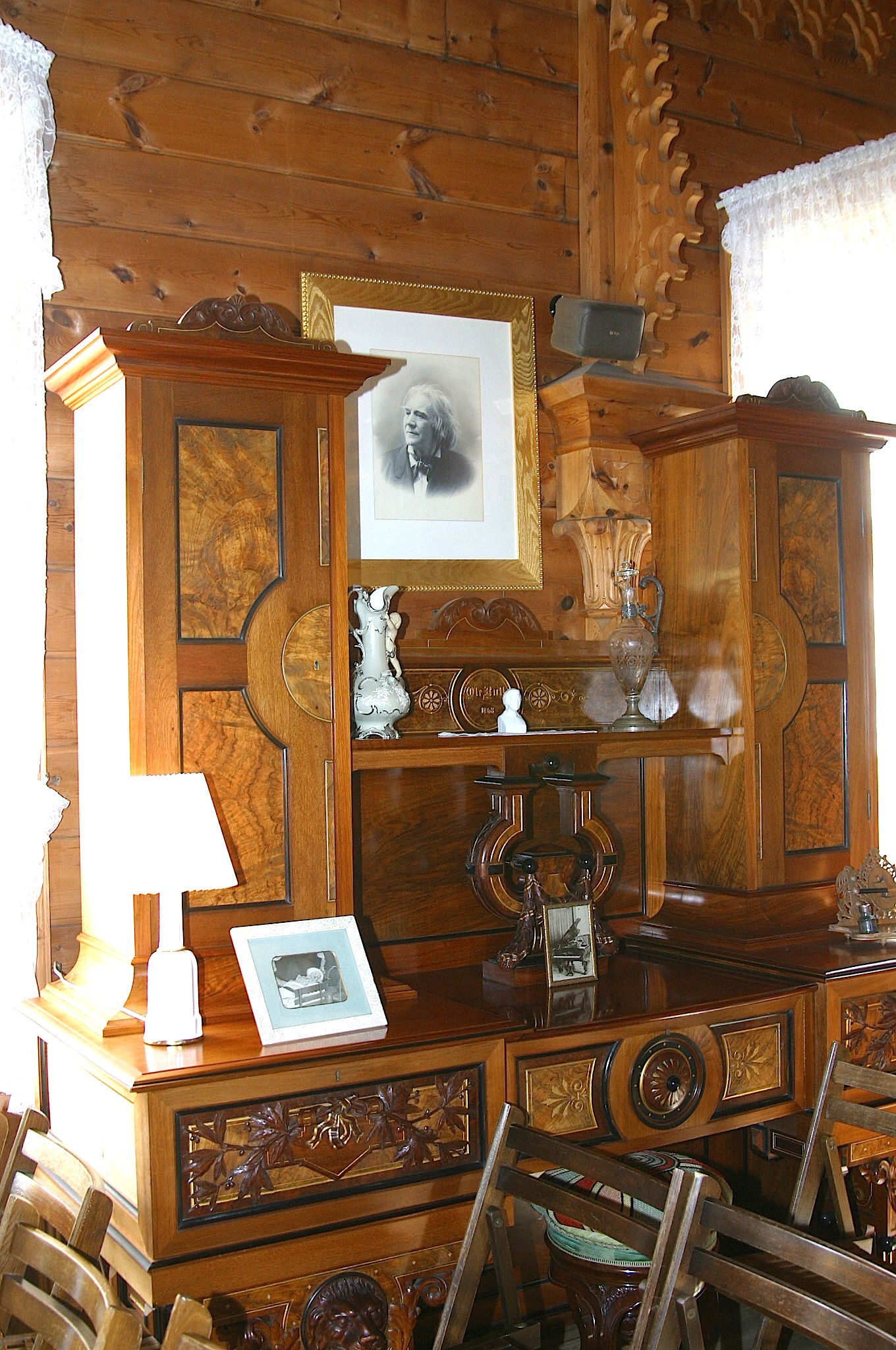

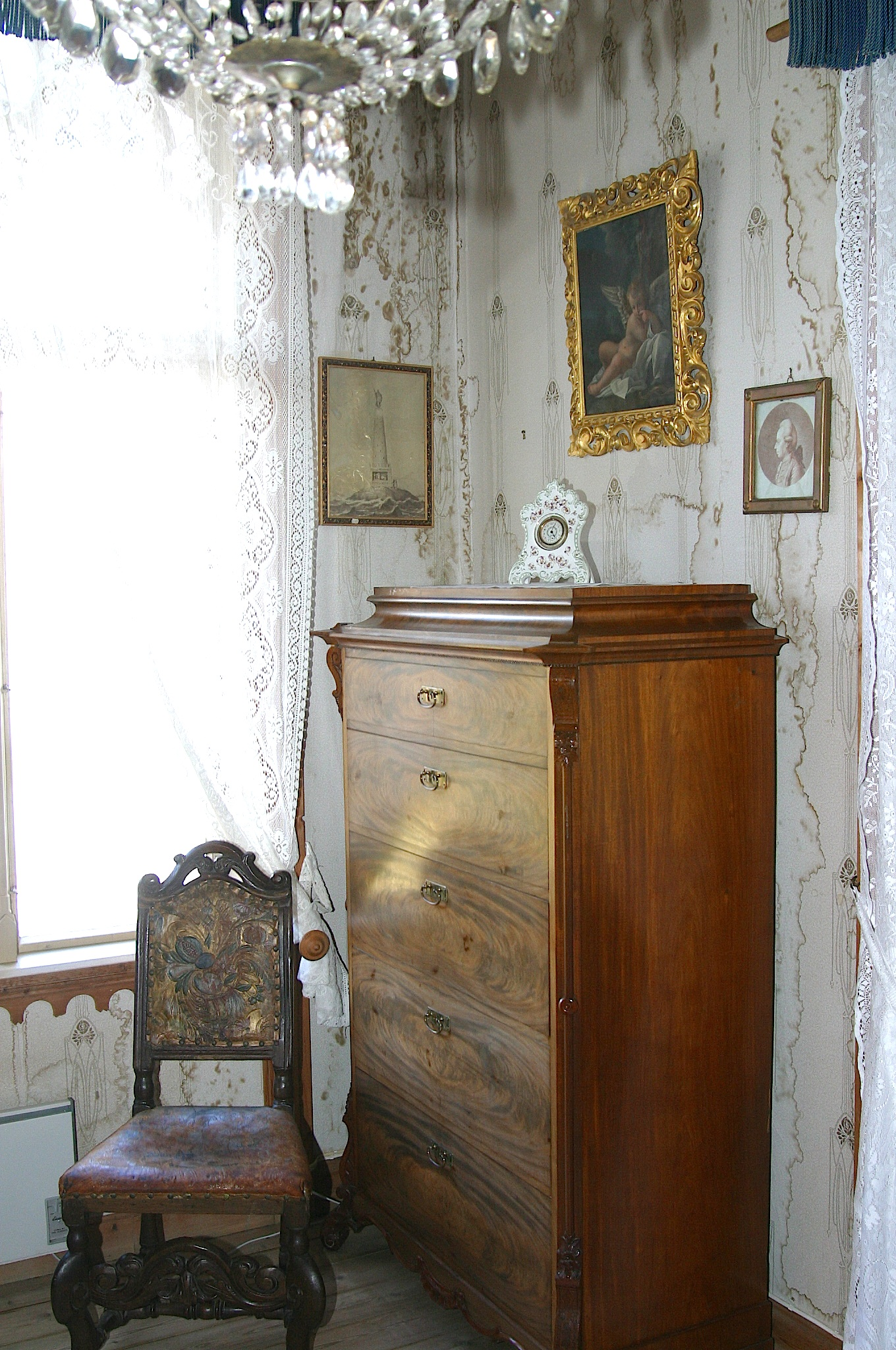

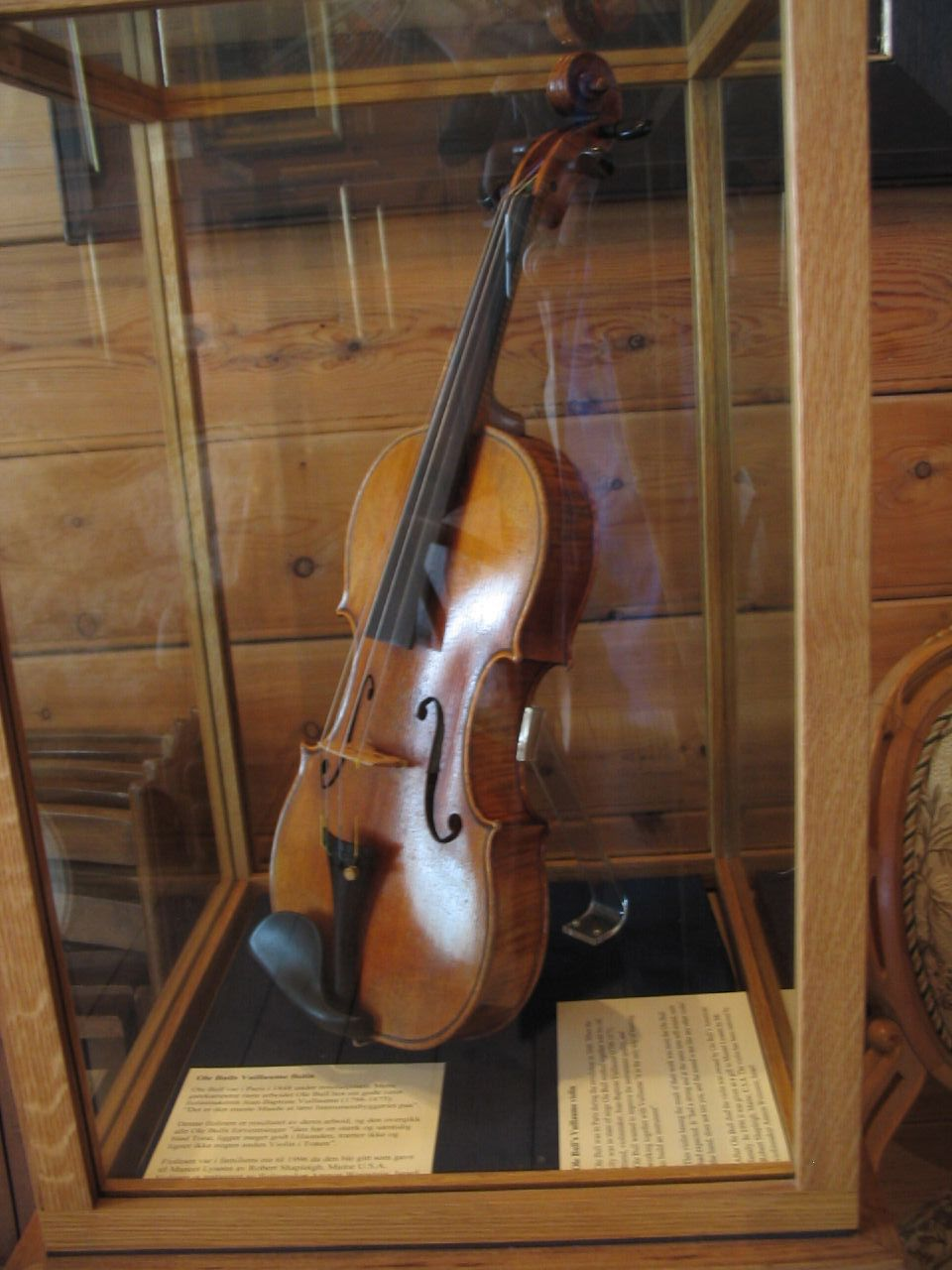

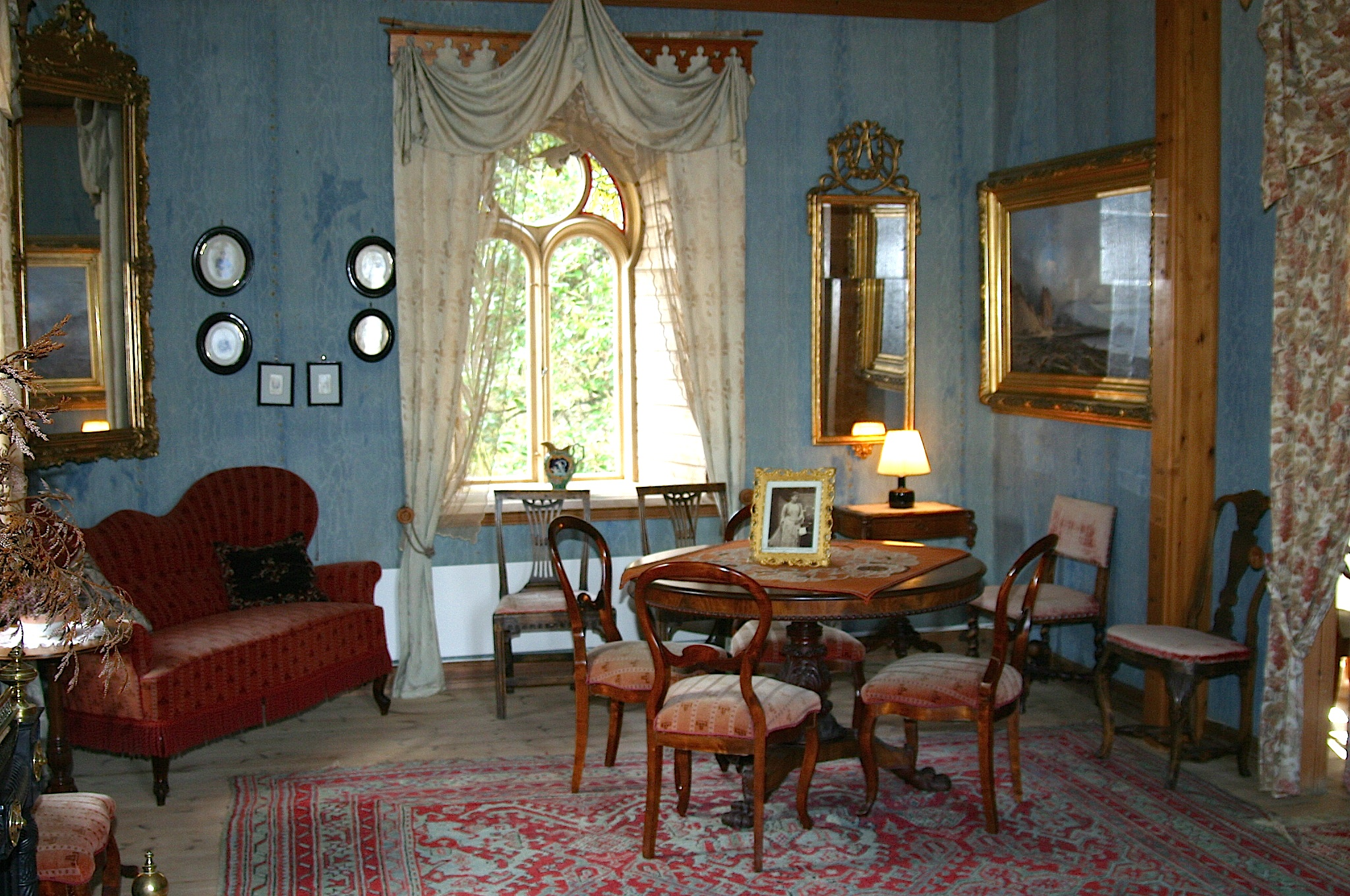

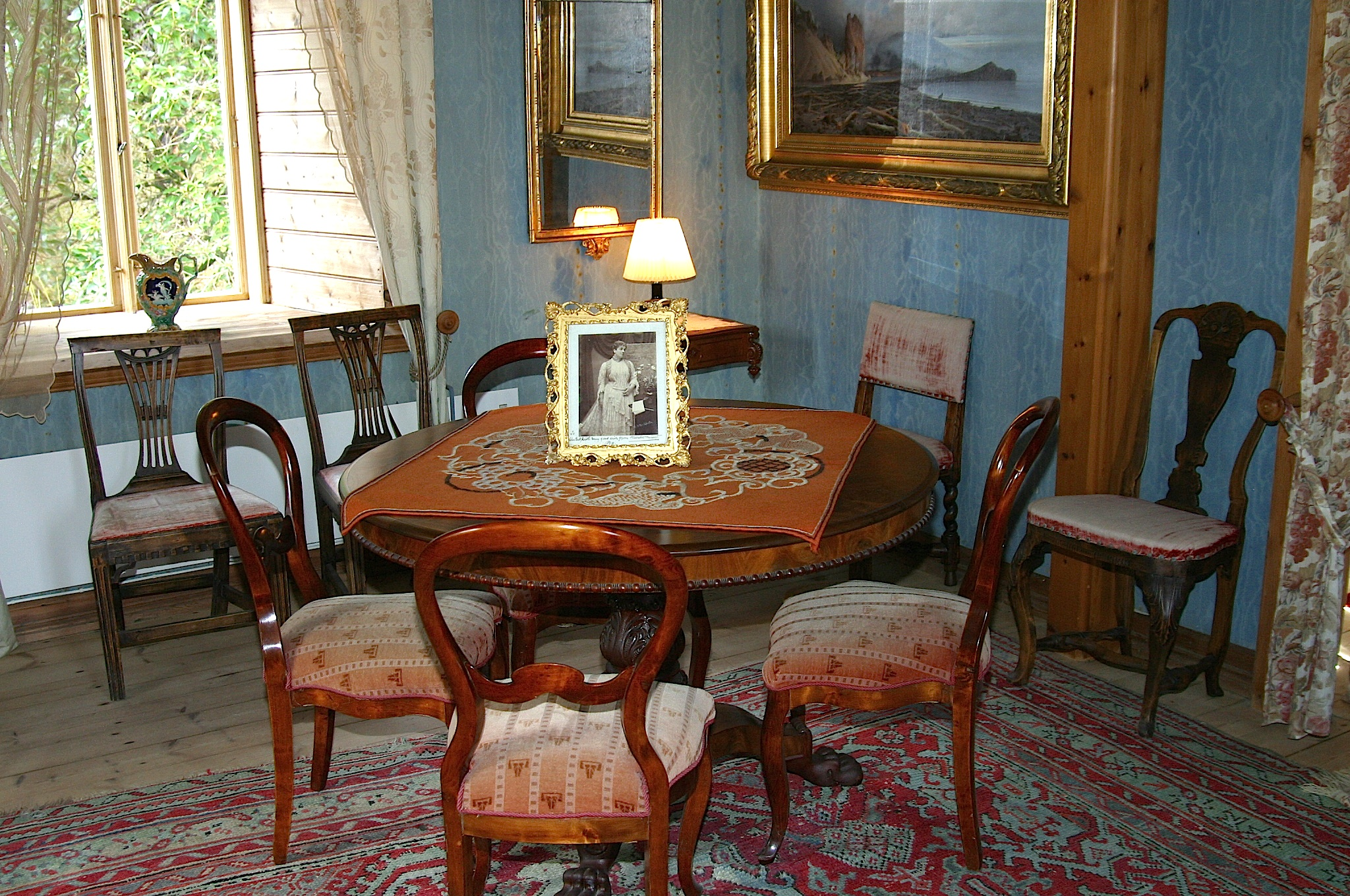

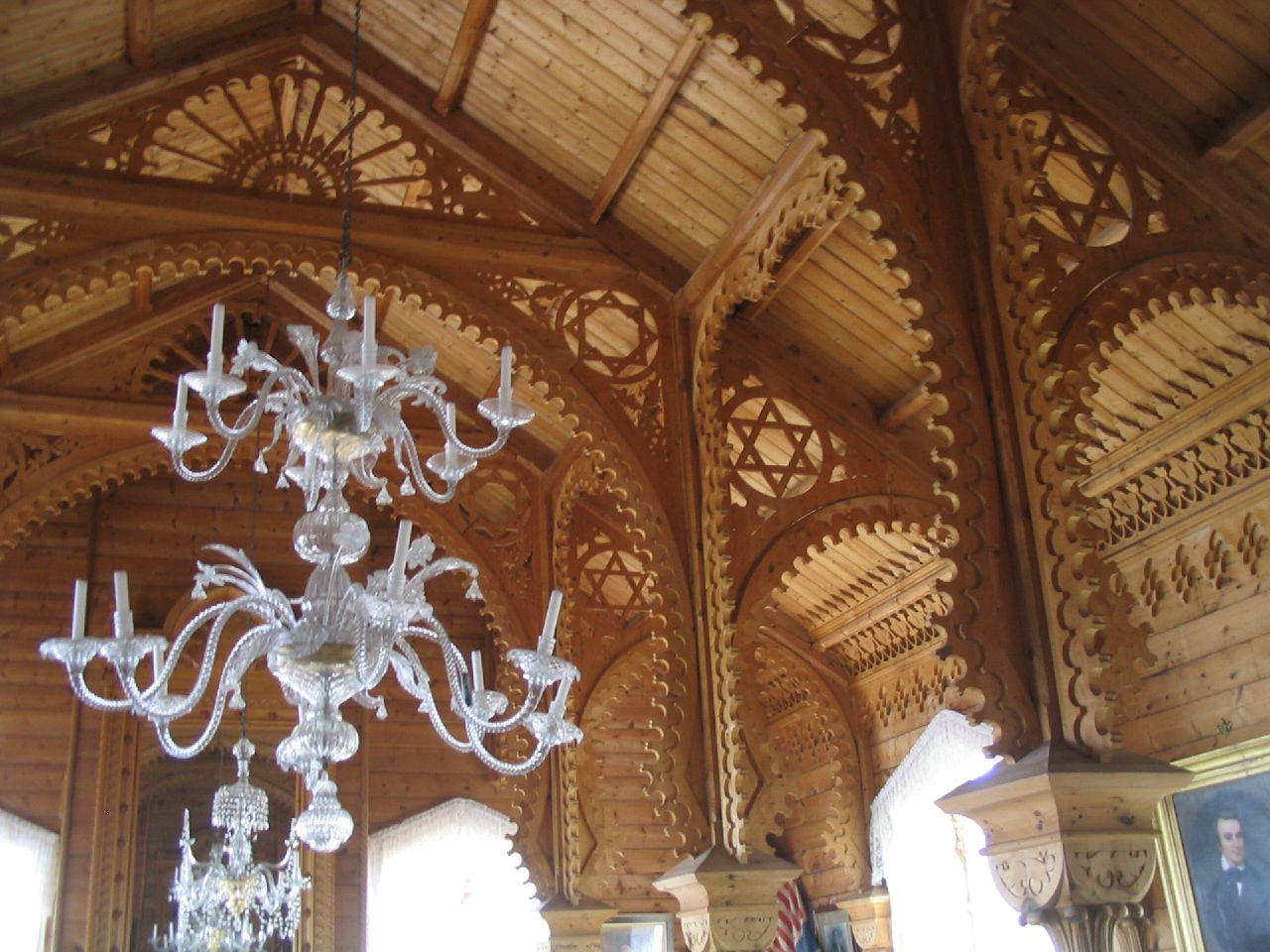

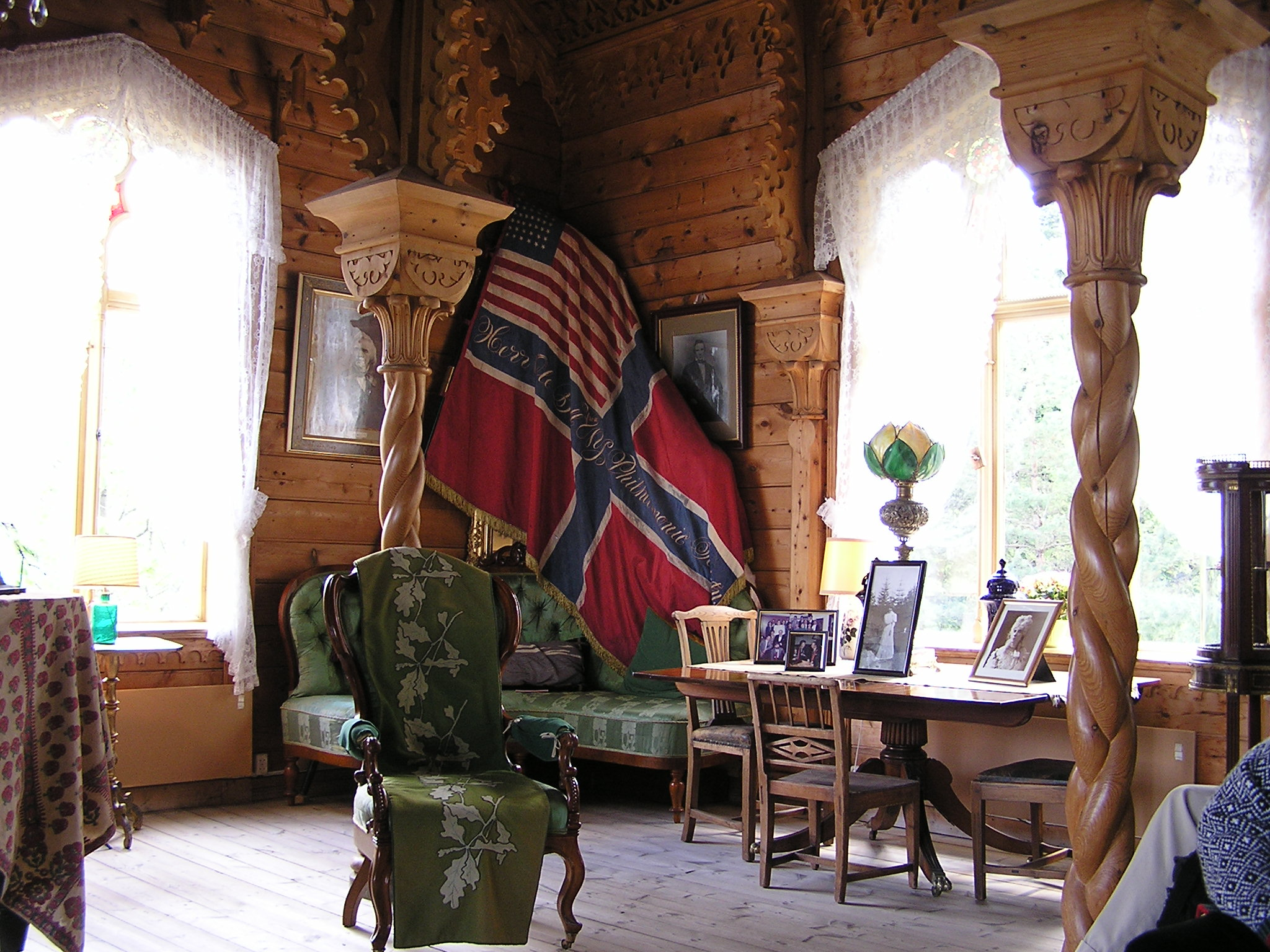

== See also ==
- List of music museums

== Other sources ==
- Indahl, Trond (2010) Ole Bull’s Villa (Bergen: Bodoni forlag)
- Brekke, Nils Georg (1993) Kulturhistorisk vegbok Hordaland (Bergen: Hordaland Fylkeskommune) ISBN 82-7326-026-7
- Bull, Sara C. (1981) Ole Bull: A Memoir (New York: Da Capo Press)
