= Torpo Stave Church =

Church in Buskerud, Norway

- Torpo stavkyrkje
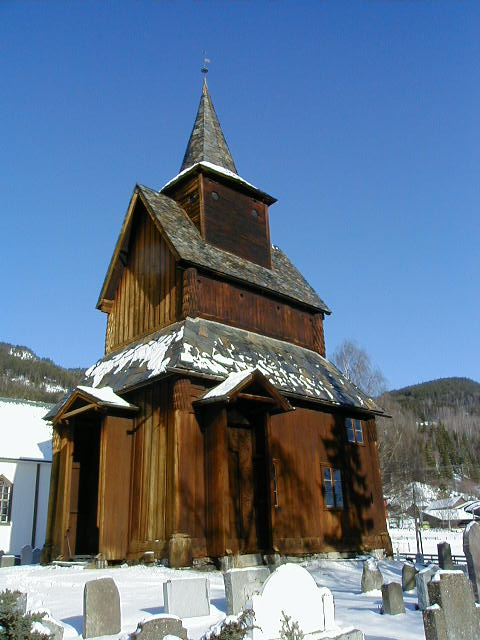
- View of the church
- Torpo Stave Church
- 60°39′51″N 8°42′30″E
- Location: Ål Municipality, Buskerud
- Country: Norway
- Denomination: Church of Norway
- Previous denomination: Catholic Church
- Churchmanship: Evangelical Lutheran

History
- Status: Parish church
- Founded: c. 1160
- Consecrated: c. 1160

Architecture
- Functional status: Active
- Architectural type: Stave church
- Style: Rectangular
- Completed: c. 1160 (866 years ago)

Specifications
- Materials: Wood

Administration
- Diocese: Tunsberg
- Deanery: Hallingdal prosti
- Parish: Ål
- Norwegian Cultural Heritage Site
- Type: Church
- Status: Automatically protected

Torpo Stave Church (Norwegian: Torpo stavkyrkje) is a historic parish church of the Church of Norway in Ål Municipality in Buskerud county, Norway. It is located in the village of Torpo. It is one of the churches for the Ål parish which is part of the Hallingdal prosti (deanery) in the Diocese of Tunsberg. The brown, wooden church was built in a rectangular stave church design during the 12th century. The church is the oldest building within the valley and traditional district of Hallingdal.

== History ==
The earliest existing historical records of the church date back to the year 1310, but the church was not built that year. The church was built during the 12th century, but the exact date is not known. Dendrochronology tests on the wood from the church date it to around the year 1160. The old stave church was originally dedicated to Saint Margareta. The original church had a rectangular nave and smaller, rectangular choir with an apse.

The church, like most other churches in Norway, was sold into private ownership during the Norwegian church sale in 1723 to help the King pay off war debts. The parish priest Jacob Stockfleth purchased the church at that time. The stave church was purchased by the municipality in 1875. Soon after, the municipality planned to expand the church with an annex to the east, but in 1879 it was decided instead to modernize the interior with new ceiling and gallery. Following protests from the Society for the Preservation of Ancient Norwegian Monuments, the municipality decided to build a new Torpo Church on the same property, just north of the old church so now the two churches stand side by side. The old stave church was preserved as a museum, although in 1880, the old choir and apse were removed because they were in poor condition. The old stave church is no longer used for church services, but it is sometimes used for special occasions.

=== Runic inscription N 110 ===
The Torpo Stave Church is one of two stave churches that are signed by their craftsmen, the other being the church at Ål. In both churches a runic inscription reads: Thorolf built this church. The full runic inscription in the Torpo Stave Church, which is listed as N 110 in the Rundata catalog, reads:

§A þorolfr : gærþi : kirku þesa ÷: askrimr ÷ hakon ÷ ælikr ÷ pal ¶ æinriþi ÷ siønti ÷ þorolfr
§B þorer ÷ ræist
§C olafr

This translates as "Þórolfr made this church. Ásgrímr, Hákon, Erlingr, Páll, Eindriði, Sjaundi, Þórulfr. Þórir carved. Ólafr."

== Media gallery ==
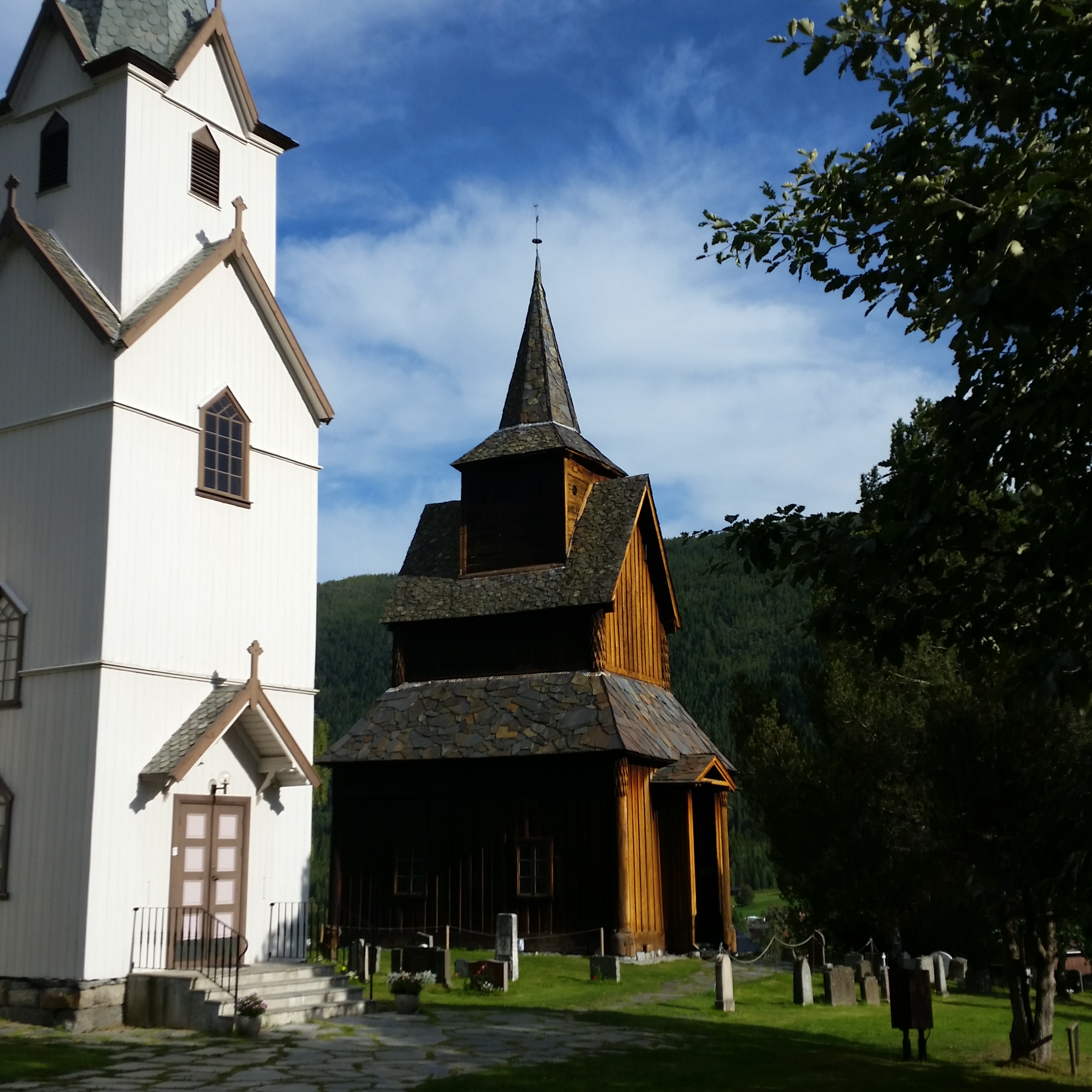
Torpo Church and Torpo Stave Church

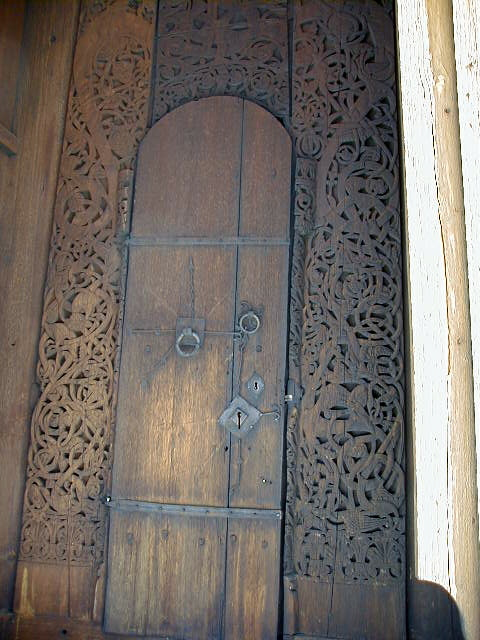
Torpo Stave Church
Main portal

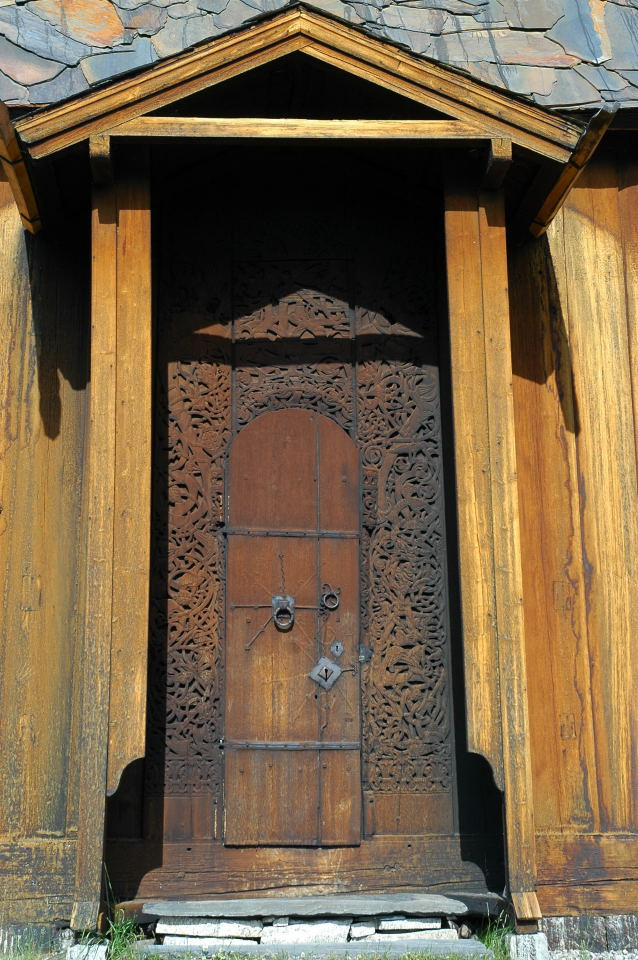
Torpo Stave Church
South portal

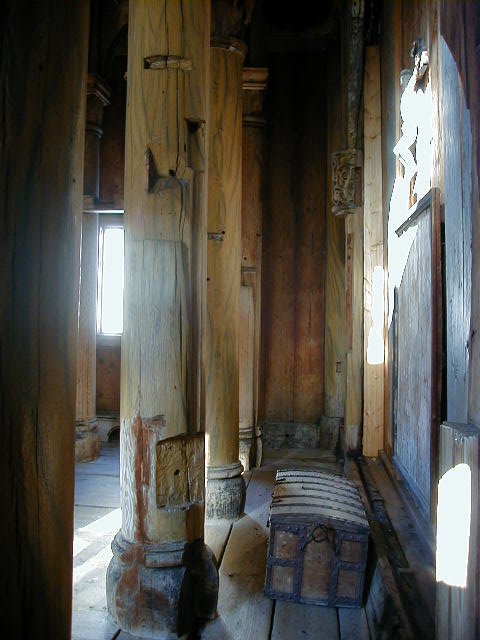
Torpo Stave Church
Interior

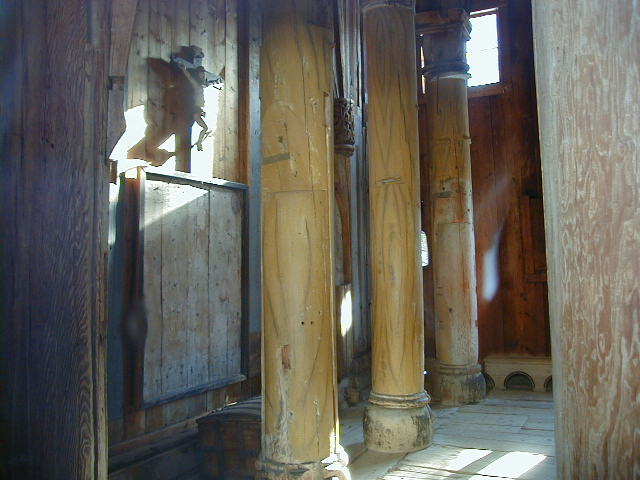
Torpo Stave Church
Interior

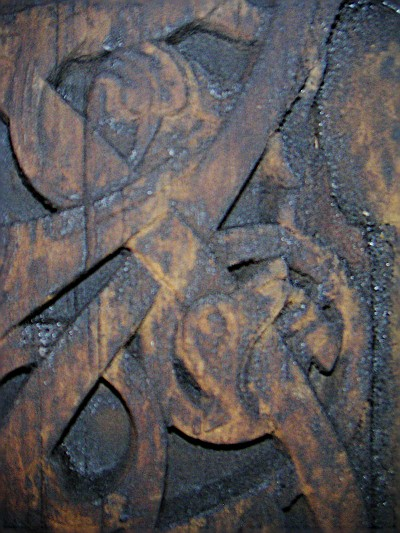
Torpo Stave Church
Interior detail

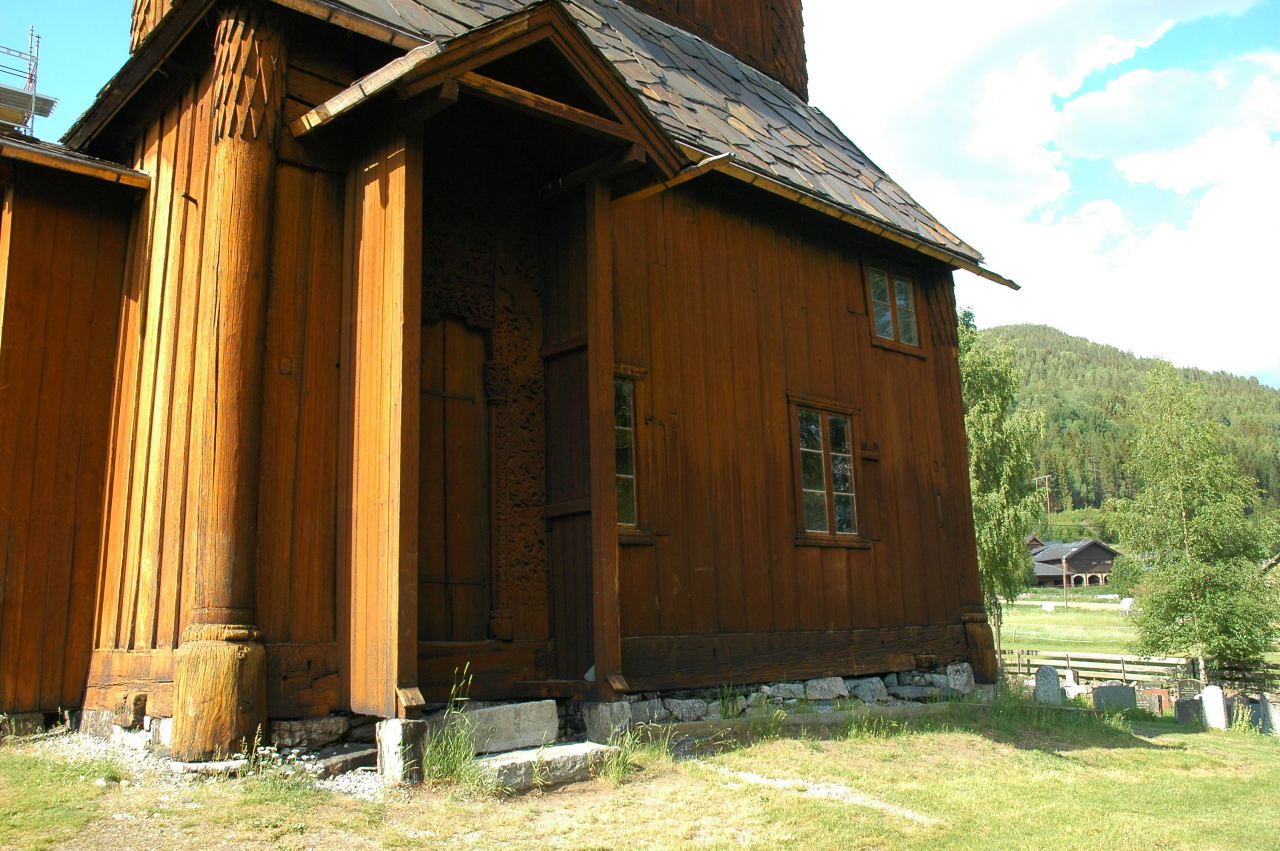
Torpo Stave Church
Exterior

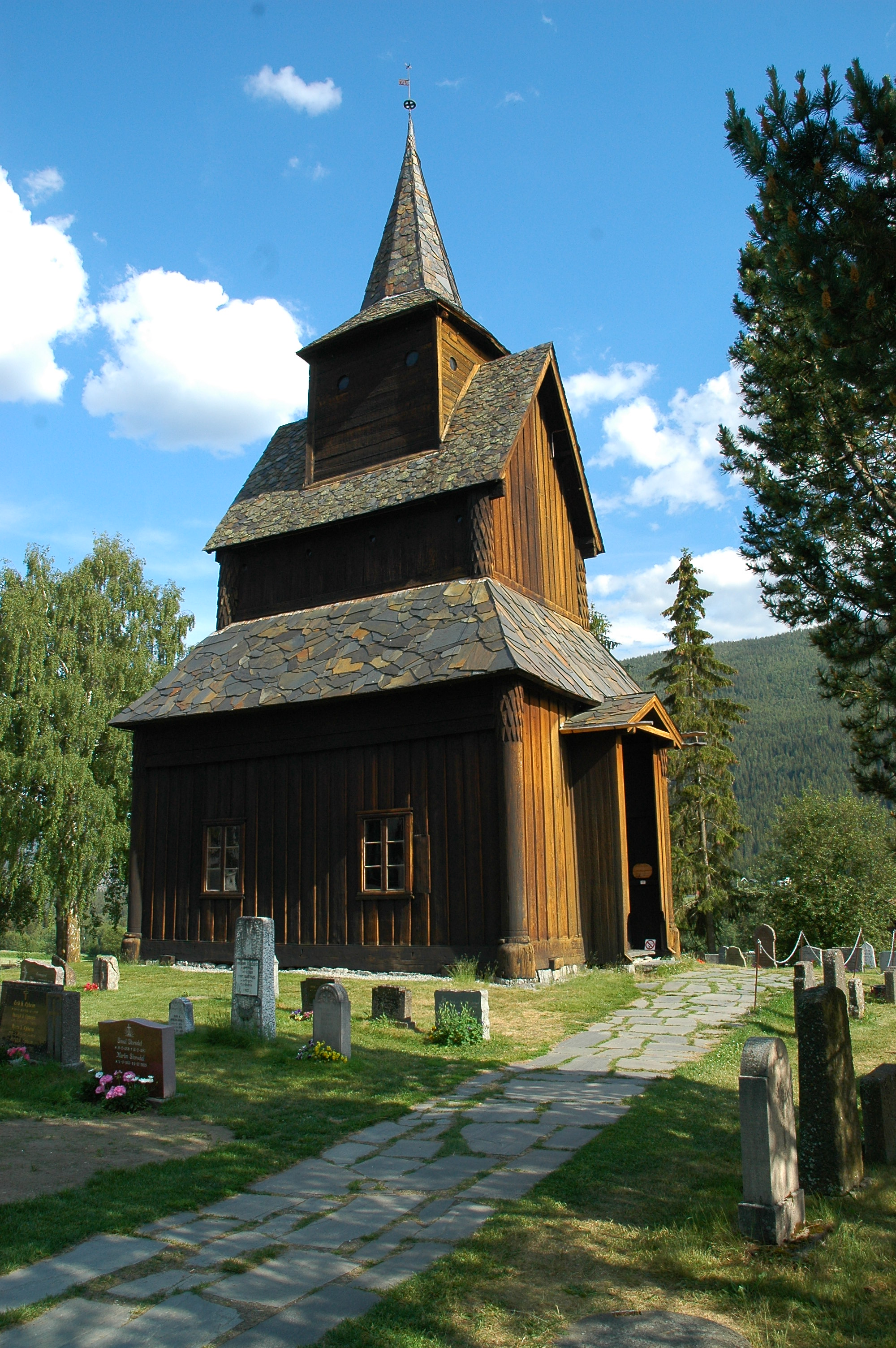
Torpo Stave Church
Exterior

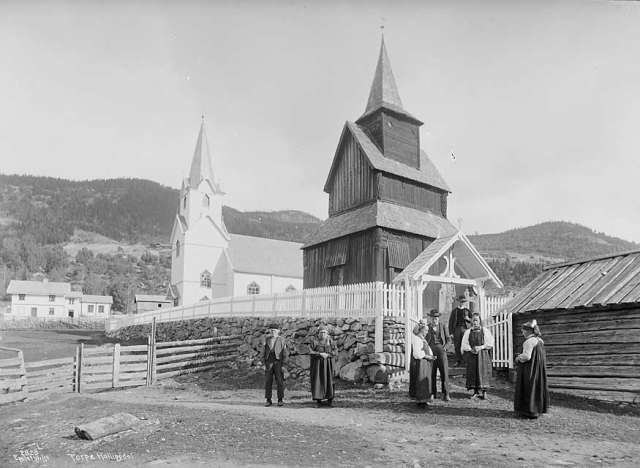
Torpo Church and Torpo Stave Church (1880–1890)

== See also ==
- List of churches in Tunsberg
