= Margrethe von der Lippe =

Norwegian ceramist

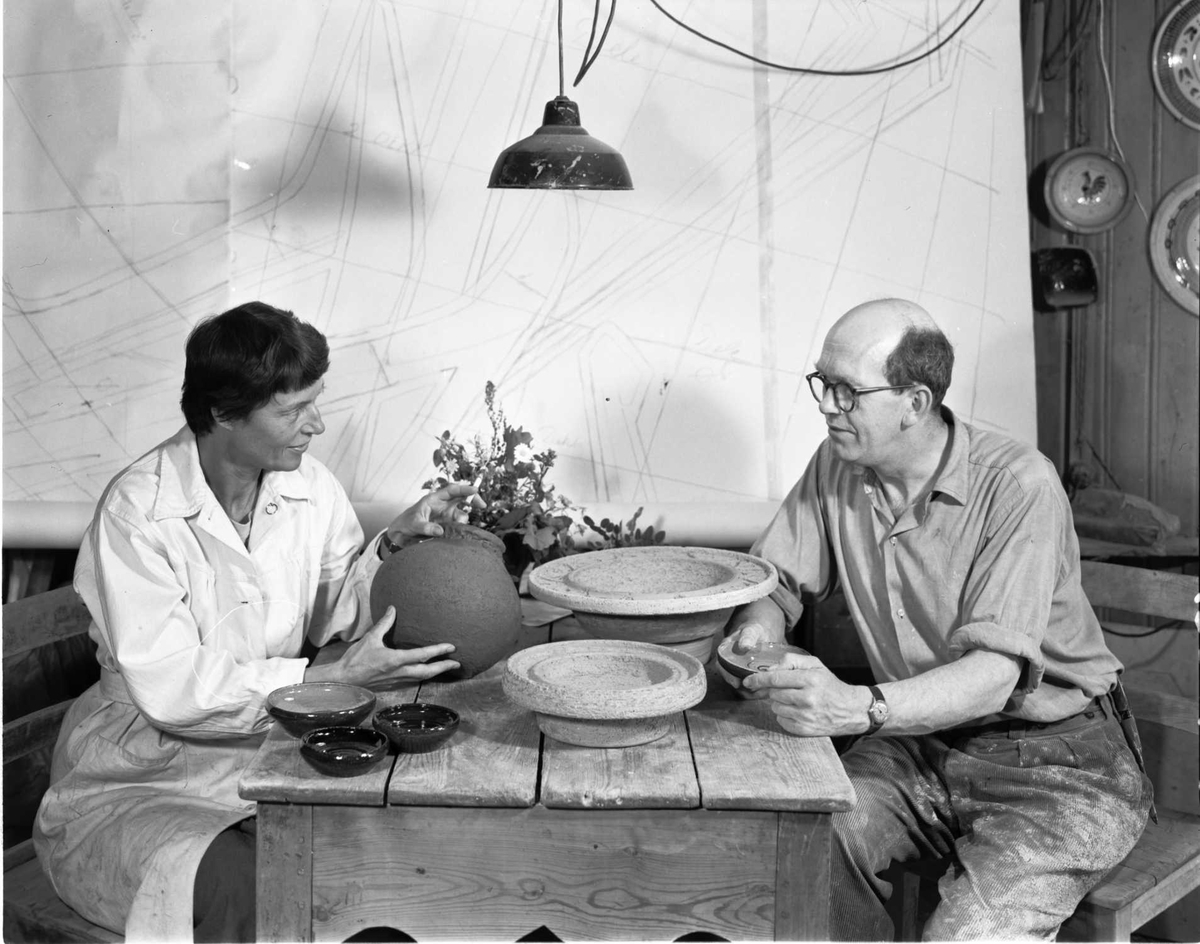
- Margrethe and Jens von der Lippe. c.1963
- Born: 9 July 1913; Trondheim, Norway
- Died: 10 March 1999 (aged 85)
- Occupation: Ceramist
- Spouse: Jens von der Lippe (m. 1936; died 1990)

Margrethe von der Lippe (née Lund; 9 July 1913 – 10 March 1999) was a Norwegian ceramist.

== Personal life ==
She was born in Trondheim, a daughter of plumber Knut Henrik Holtermann Lund and Fredrikke Regine Brun. She married ceramist Jens von der Lippe in 1936.

== Career ==
Von der Lippe studied at the Norwegian National Academy of Craft and Art Industry and at the Staatliche Kunstgewerbeschule in Wien. She ran a ceramics workshop in Oslo in cooperation with her husband, and many of their works were co-productions. She was awarded the Jacob Prize in 1970, jointly with her husband. Her works are represented in various museums in Norway.
