= Conrad Fredrik von der Lippe =

Norwegian architect

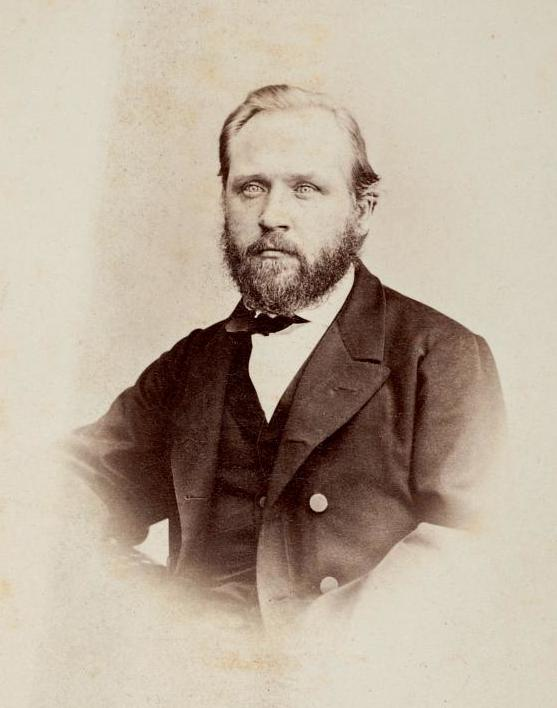
Conrad Fredrik von der Lippe

Conrad Fredrik "Fritz" von der Lippe (8 October 1833 – 1901) was a Norwegian architect.

He was born at Christianssand (now spelled Kristiansand) in Lister og Mandal county, Norway. He was a son of bishop Jacob von der Lippe, a grandfather of the three brothers Frits von der Lippe, Just Lippe and Jens von der Lippe, and uncle of the half-brothers, admiral Jakob von der Lippe and whaler Anton Barth von der Lippe.

He studied at the Polytechnische Schule in Hanover (now University of Hanover) from 1851 to 1853, and then in Darmstadt and Vienna. When he returned to Christianssand in 1856 and opened his own architect's firm, he was the first educated architect in the region. He established an office in Stavanger in 1857. From 1860 to 1870 he was the city's building inspector. He designed urban buildings, schools and churches. He held a similar position in Bergen from 1870 to 1900. Between 1873 and 1881 he cooperated with Hans Heinrich Jess. After 1881 he was only allowed to design public buildings if working within Bergen's city limits.

Von der Lippe designed Vegusdal Church in Birkenes, Villa Snøringsmoen in Lillesand, St. Petri Church and Sangsalen in Stavanger.

He has also received credit for the design of Ole Bull's Villa Lysøen on the island of Lysøya in Os Municipality outside of Bergen.

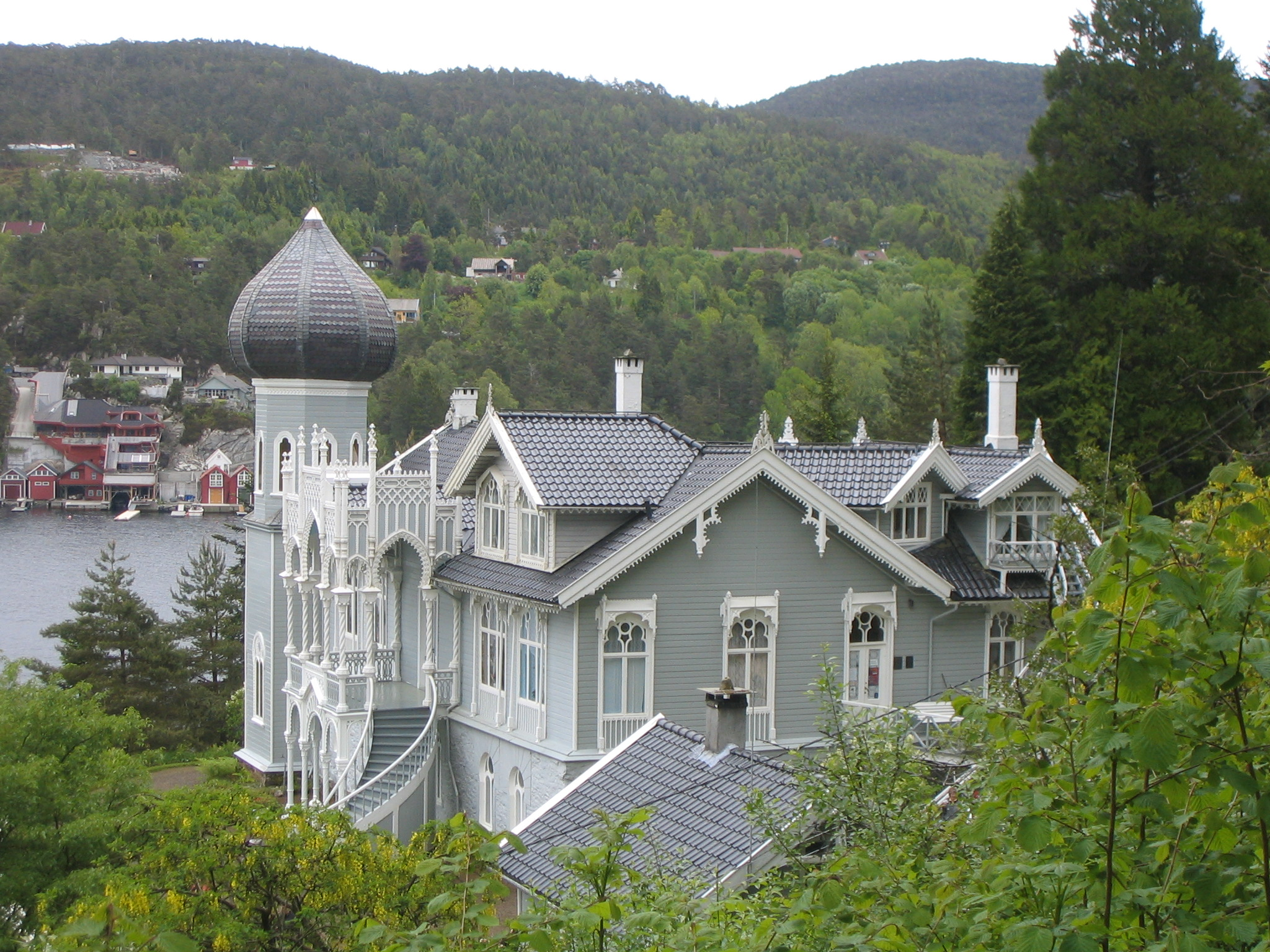
Villa Lysøen (1873)

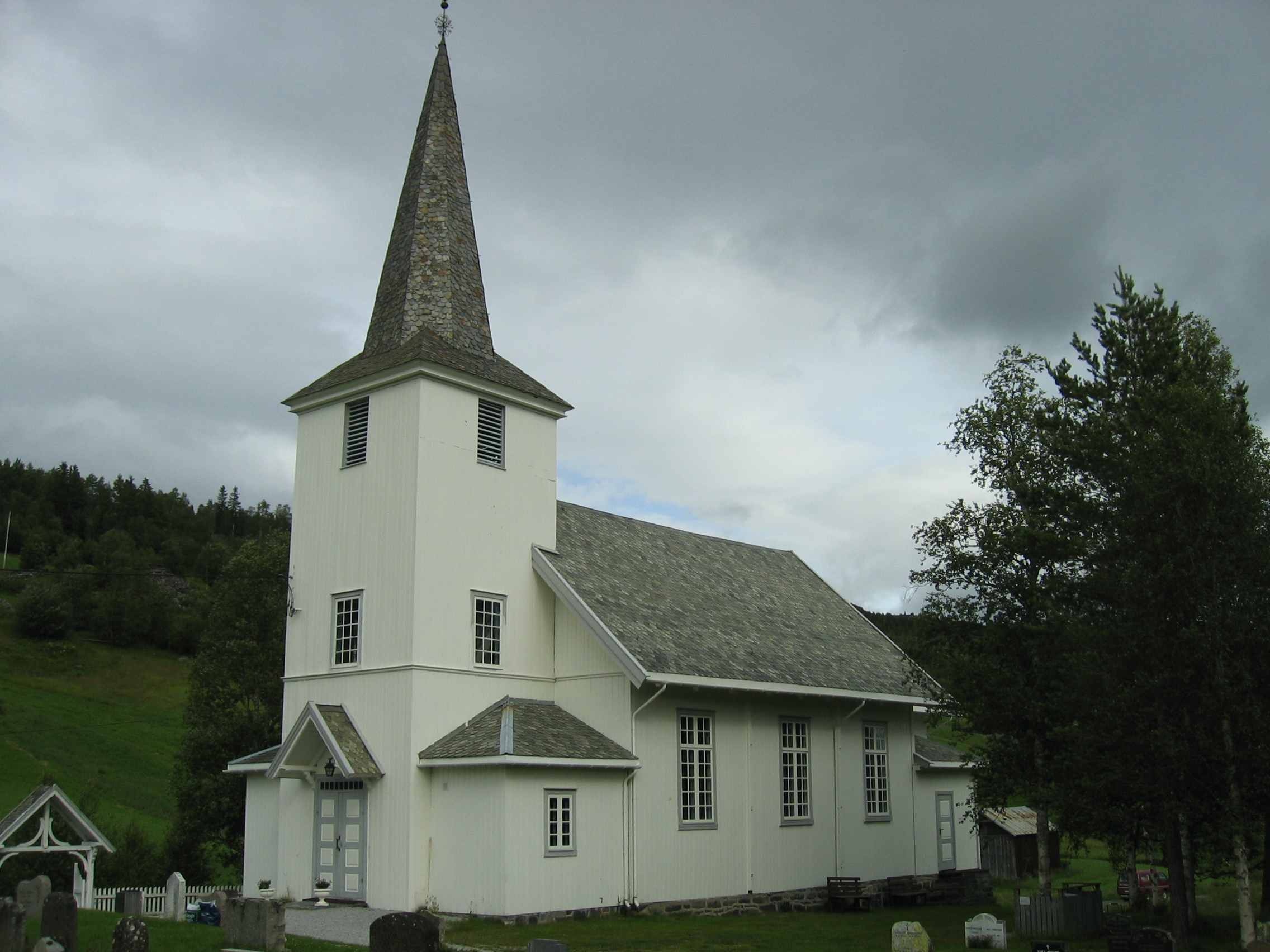
Leveld Church (1880)

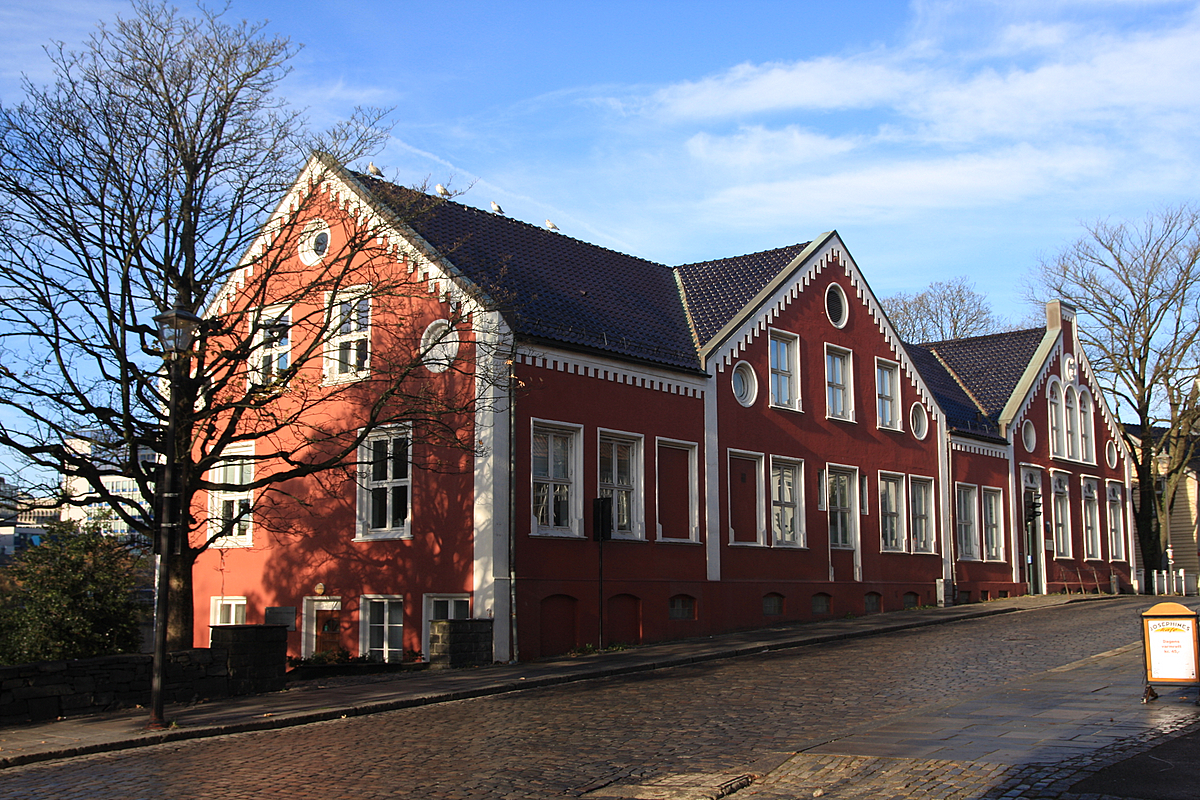
Kongsgata 47–49 in Stavanger (1867)
