= Jacob von der Lippe =

Norwegian politician (1797–1878)

Right Reverend Jacob von der Lippe
- Bishop of Christianssand
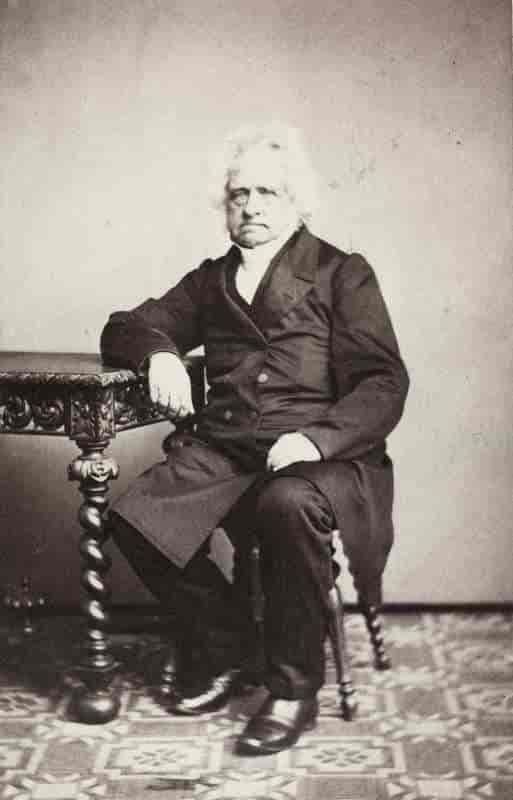
- Church: Church of Norway
- Diocese: Diocese of Christianssand
- Appointed: 1841
- In office: 1841–1875
- Predecessor: Mathias Sigwardt
- Successor: Jørgen Moe

Personal details
- Born: 27 September 1797 Bergen, Norway
- Died: 2 October 1878 (aged 81) Kristianssand, Norway
- Denomination: Christian
- Occupation: Priest

Jacob von der Lippe (27 September 1797 – 2 October 1878) was a Norwegian politician and priest who served as Bishop of the Diocese of Christianssand from 1841 to 1875. He was also a member of the Parliament of Norway for a total of eight non-consecutive parliamentary terms from 1829 until 1861.

== Education ==
Jacob von der Lippe was born in Bergen, Norway on 27 September 1797 into a merchant family. After graduating with an Examen artium certificate in 1818, he went on to study theology at the Royal Frederick University in Christiania where he received a Cand.theol. degree in 1819.

== Career ==
=== Priest ===
His first job after the university was as a curate at Haus Church, just outside of the city of Bergen in Western Norway. In 1821, he was given the job of parish priest at Skånevik Church in the far southern part of Søndre Bergenhus county. He held this job until 1825 when he was transferred to the parish of Avaldsnes Church on the island of Karmøy, just outside of Haugesund. In 1829, he was elected to be the Dean of the Karmsund prosti (deanery) in northern Stavanger amt (county). In 1831, von der Lippe was elected to be the stiftsprost in Kristiansand, one of the highest ranking priests in the Diocese of Christianssand. During this time, he served as the acting Bishop twice. In 1841, the King appointed him to be the Bishop of the diocese. He held that post until his retirement in 1875. He was succeeded by Jørgen Moe as bishop.

During his time as Bishop, he was characterized as fairly conservative in his beliefs, and he was also thought of as fairly authoritarian. An old story about von der Lippe says that a farmer had met with the bishop, and afterwards exclaimed "Det er den største diktator jeg har hørt!" which means "That is the biggest dictator I have ever met!".

=== Politician ===
He was first elected to the Parliament of Norway in the 1829 Storting election while serving as dean in Avaldsnes. When he moved to Christianssand, he was steadily re-elected to represent that city in the 1832 Storting election, the 1835 Storting election, the 1838 Storting election, and the 1841 Storting election. He declined re-election in 1845, but he did get re-elected in the 1847 Storting election. Again in 1850, he declined to run, but in the 1853 election he was elected again to represent Christianssand. He again decided not to run for re-election in 1857, but two years later in the 1859 Storting election he was elected for his final term in office.

When the municipal government law was implemented in 1838 (see formannskapsdistrikt law), he was elected to the municipal council for the city of Christianssand, a position that he held until 1840.

== Personal life ==
Jacob von der Lippe was born in Bergen, Norway, on 27 September 1797 to parents Gerhard von der Lippe (1776–1830) and Antonette Ulriche Dietrichson (1770–1801). He was married on 5 July 1820 Ingeborg Erichsen (1800–1880). He is the great-grandfather to Frits von der Lippe and Jens von der Lippe. He died on 2 October 1878 in the city of Kristiansand, Norway, at the age of 81.

Religious titles
Preceded by Mathias Sigwardt	Bishop of Christianssand; 1841–1875	Succeeded by Jørgen Engebretsen Moe
