= Jens von der Lippe =

Norwegian ceramic artist, teacher, and art writer (1911–1990)

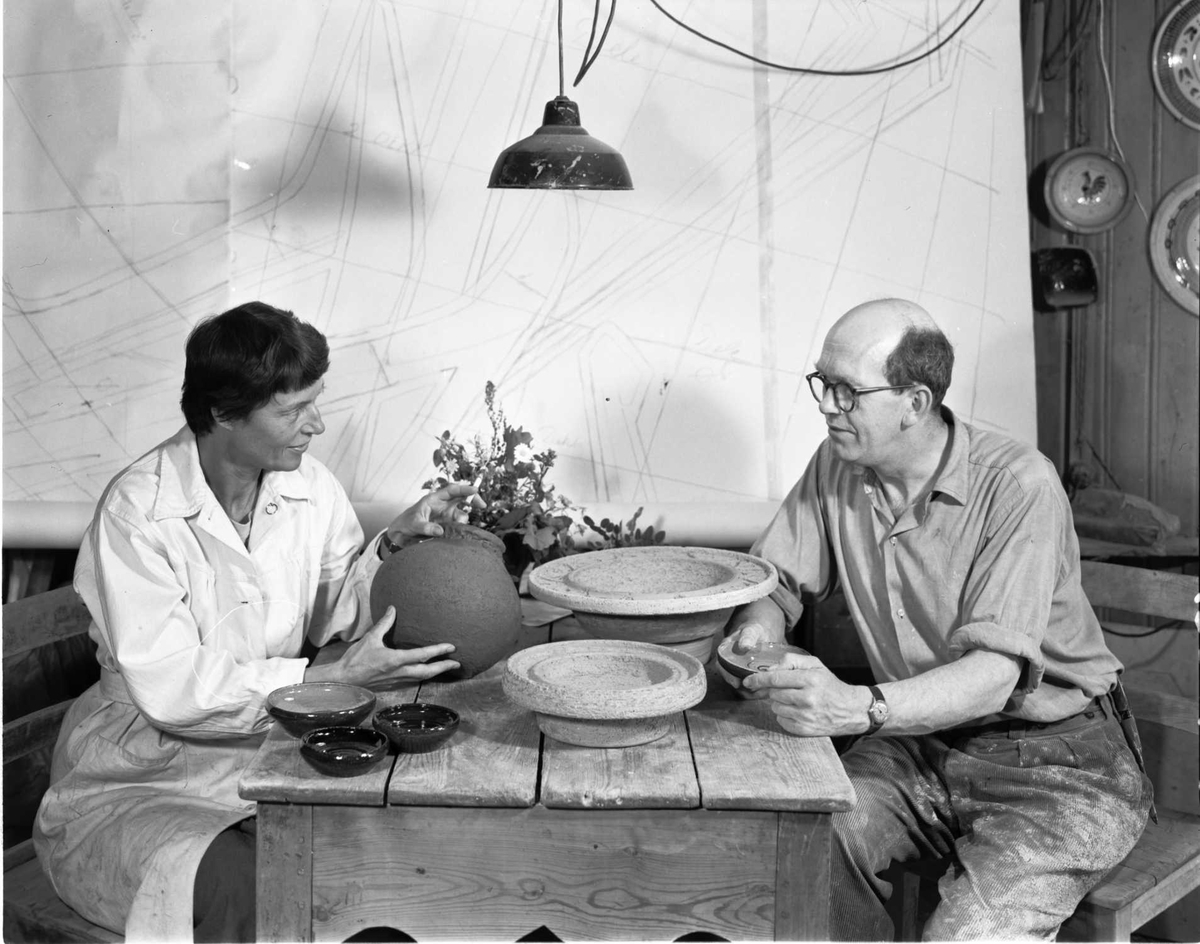
- Margrethe and Jens von der Lippe.
- Born: 13 October 1911; Christiania, Norway
- Died: 17 June 1990 (aged 78)
- Occupations: Ceramist, non-fiction writer and educator
- Spouse: Margrethe von der Lippe (m. 1936)
- Relatives: Frits von der Lippe; Just Lippe

Jens von der Lippe (13 October 1911 – 17 June 1990) was a Norwegian ceramist, non-fiction writer and educator. He was born in Christiania, and was a brother of Frits von der Lippe and Just Lippe. He ran a ceramics workshop in Oslo in cooperation with his wife, Margrethe von der Lippe, and many of their works were co-productions. He lectured at the Norwegian National Academy of Craft and Art Industry from 1939 to 1975. He published the book Stråmønsteret – det udødelige blåmalede in 1983.
