= Frits von der Lippe =

Norwegian journalist and theater critic

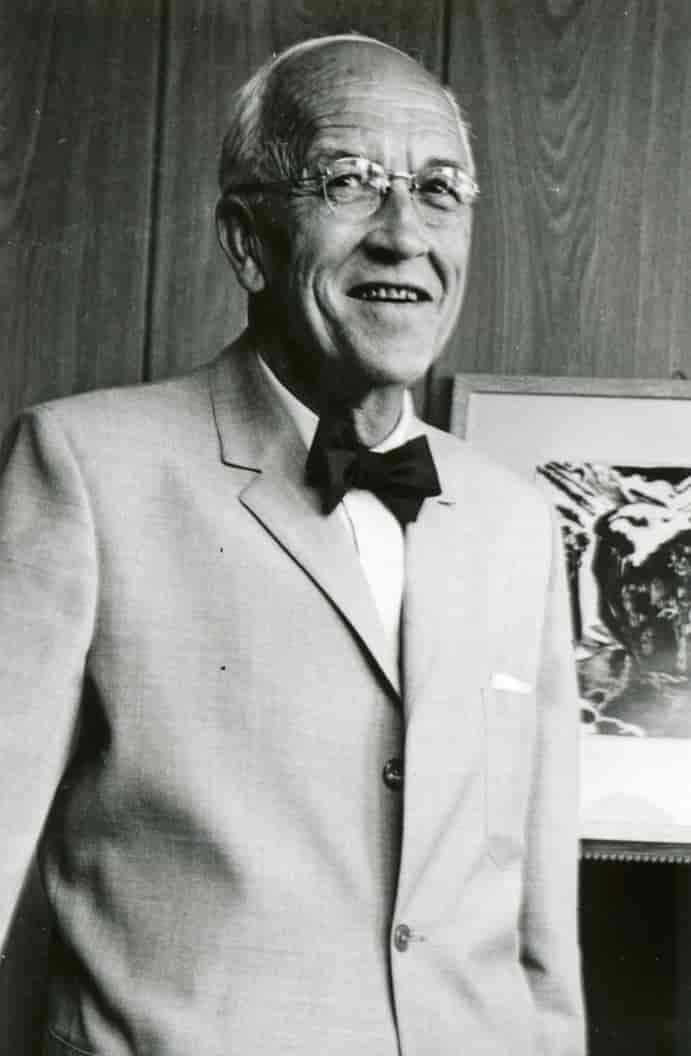
- Born: 1 June 1901; Bergen
- Died: 5 September 1988 (aged 87)
- Occupations: Journalist, theatre critic and theatre director
- Relatives: Jens von der Lippe (brother)
- Awards: Arts Council Norway Honorary Award (1968)

Frits von der Lippe (1 June 1901 – 5 September 1988) was a Norwegian journalist and theater critic. He served as Director of Riksteatret in Oslo from 1949–1968.

== Biography ==
Von der Lippe was born in Bergen, Norway. His parents were Jakob von der Lippe (1870–1954) and Hanna Castberg (1872–1926). His brother Jens von der Lippe (1911–1990) was a ceramist, non-fiction writer and educator. He grew up in Kristiania (now Oslo) where he took his examen artium in 1919. He worked the next year as a teacher at Boen near Kristiansand. He then started a career in journalism. He was employed at Tidens Tegn from 1920–21 and then at Morgenposten where he was a theater critic until 1930. From 1930 to 1949, he worked as Deputy Secretary for Gyldendal Norsk Forlag. During the Occupation of Norway by Nazi Germany, publishing director Harald Grieg was under arrest from 1941-42. Von der Lippe attended to the interests of the publisher during that period.

In parallel with the publishing activities after World War II, von der Lippe wrote theater reviews in a series of newspapers. He was the first Director of the Riksteatret from 1949 to 1968. He was also chairman of the Norwegian Theater and Music Council from 1947–49 and was chairman of the board of the Norwegian National Academy of Theatre from 1953 to 1971. He was awarded the Arts Council Norway Honorary Award (Norsk kulturråds ærespris) in 1968 for his contributions to Norwegian culture.

== Bibliography ==
Rundt land og strand. Ved Riksteatrets første milepel (1959)

Cultural offices
Preceded by position created	Director of the Riksteatret; 1949–1968	Succeeded by Eivind Hjelmtveit
Awards
Preceded by first recipient	Recipient of the Arts Council Norway Honorary Award; 1968	Succeeded by Hans Peter L'Orange
