= Klaveness =

Klaveness is a surname. Notable people with the surname include:

- Anton Fredrik Klaveness (1874–1958), Norwegian ship-owner
- Anton Fredrik Klaveness (1903–1981), Norwegian equestrian and ship-owner
- Dag Klaveness (1913–1986), Norwegian ship-owner
- Dag Klaveness (limnologist) (1945–2020), Norwegian limnologist
- Henrik Klaveness (1826–1888), Norwegian ship-owner and politician
- Kristine Klaveness (born 1976), Norwegian rower
- Lise Klaveness (born 1981), Norwegian lawyer and footballer

== See also ==
- A. F. Klaveness & Co, Norwegian former shipping company formed by a certain branch of the Klaveness family
- Kapp Klaveness, headland
- Torvald Klaveness Group, Norwegian shipping company formed by another branch of the Klaveness family
