= Dag Klaveness =

Norwegian ship-owner (1913–1986)

Dag Klaveness (22 September 1913 – 26 February 1986) was a Norwegian ship-owner.

== Personal life ==
He was born in Bærum as a son of ship-owner Anton Fredrik Klaveness (1874–1958). He was a brother of ship-owner Anton Fredrik Klaveness (1903–1981), brother-in-law of Johan H. Andresen, nephew of Johan Karsten Rasmussen, and grandnephew of ship-owner and politician Henrik Klaveness.

In 1939, he married Wanda Young Fearnley, a daughter of landowner Nils Olav Young Fearnley and Ingeborg Heiberg. They settled at the farm Nedre Ringi in Bærum.

== Career ==
Klaveness finished his secondary education in 1931 and took one year of officer's training before moving to Switzerland. After taking commerce school in Neuchâtel, he graduated from the University of Neuchâtel in 1935. From 1939, he spent his career as chief executive officer of the major shipping corporation A. F. Klaveness & Co.

He chaired Selco from 1956 to 1965, Skipsassuranseforeningen Unitas and Robergmyrene. He was a board member of Høyanger, Norsk Aluminium Compani and Nordisk Aluminiumindustri from 1958 to 1967. He was a supervisory council member of Årdal og Sunndal Verk and the Norwegian America Line (deputy). In the Norwegian Shipowners' Association, he became a national board member in 1962, central board member in 1964, vice president in 1968 and president in 1972, serving for one year. He continued from 1974 to 1983 in the financial committee. He became a board member of the private club Shippingklubben in 1953 and chaired it from 1962 to 1964. He was also a council member of the University of Oslo's Norwegian Institute in Rome.

Klaveness was decorated as a Knight, First Class of the Order of St. Olav in 1977. He died in February 1986 and was buried at Tanum.

Preceded by	President of the Norwegian Shipowners' Association; 1972–1973	Succeeded by
