= List of ships built at Framnæs shipyard =

This is a list of ships built by the Framnæs Mekaniske Værksted in Sandefjord, Norway.

== Rødsverven, Søren Lorentz Christensen ==
Built year	Ship type	Name	Tonnage	Owner
1842	Barque	Fortuna	173 (capacity)	
1846		Havfruen	205.5	Søren Lorentz Christensen & Thorer Thoresen, Tjøme
1848		Freya	183.5	
1850		Otilia	222	
1854		Charle Napier	73	
1856	Barque	Kronprinds Carl	267 (capacity)	

== Rødsverven, Lars Engebretsen ==
Built year	Ship type	Name	Tonnage	Owner
1872		Unita	123 (capacity)	P. A. Grøn, M. Grøn, Ebbesen and others
1872		Thonetta	75	P. Andersen (carpenter)
1873		Joanchas	69	Andersen, Tveitan
1873		Skiringshal	160	O. Andersen
1873		Gallis	150	I. M. Osmundsen
1874			71.5	O. Nielsen

== Rødsverven (Framnæs), Christen Christensen ==
No.	Built year	Ship type	Name	Tonnage	Owner
1	1868	Schooner	Sleipner	66.5 (capacity)	Otilie Christensen
2	1871		Fremad		Christen Christensen
3	1869	Schooner	Fredrikke	45	Christen Christensen
4	1870	Brig	Nornen	105.5	P. A. Grønn
5	1872	Brig	Rap	32	Christen Christensen
6	1873	Barque	Granen	143.5	Christen Christensen
7	1875	Brig	Ocean	222 (capacity)	P. A. Grønn
8	1877	Barque	Magnat	659	A. F. Klavness
9	1880		Havfruen		A. F. Klavness
10	1879		Framnæs	712	Christen Christensen
11	1881		Augusta	852	A. F. Klavness
12	1881	Sealer	Jason	495	Christen Christensen
13	1883	Sealer	Elida	220	Christen Christensen
14	1884		Hertha	253	Christen Christensen
15	1885		Fortuna	165	Christen Christensen
15 A	1885		Farris II		
16	1882	Schooner	Eskimo	110	Fisken, Tønsberg
17	1883		Gugner	62	Alf Monsen, Tønsberg
18	1883		Haabet	65	Christen Christensen
19	1884	Floating dock		600 (capacity)	Christen Christensen
20	1888	Floating dock		600 (capacity)	Nyland
21	1886	Floating dock		600 (capacity)	Christen Christensen
22	1889	Steamship (wood)	Balto	463	D.S National
23	1889		Ravna	465	
24	1890		Nordpolen	499	D.S Meier, Christiania
25	1891		Verita	494	Thorvildsen, Tvedstr.
26	1892		Fortuna	1,366	Johan Bryde
	1893	Steamship (steel)	Prøven		Christen Christensen
27	1893	Viking ship	Viking		Arb.kom.NO
28	1893	Viking ship	Leiv Eriksen		N.M. Kødt, Copenhagen
	1895	Schooner	Felix	300	P. A. Grønn
29	1898	Steamship (wood)	Godthaab	287	Royal Greenland Trading Department, Copenhagen
30	1896	Steamship (steel)	Framnæs	146	Thøger Andresen, Larvik
31	1898	Steamship (steel)	Heim	1,195	And. Jacobsen, Christiania
32	1898		Daggry	1,206	John P. Pedersen and others

== Framnæs mek Værksted ==
No.	Built year	Ship type	Name	B.R.T.	Owner
33	1899	Dry cargo steamship (700 HP)	Raum	1,245	And. Jacobsen, Oslo
34	1899	Dry cargo steamship (700 HP)	Prima	1,233	Chr. Nielsen & Co. Larvik
35	1900	Dry cargo steamship	Tolv	1,194	And. Jacobsen, Oslo
36	1900	Dry cargo steamship	Rein	1,175	And. Jacobsen, Oslo
37	1901	Dry cargo steamship	St. Olav		Brødrene Bjørnstad, Sarpsborg
38	1901	Dry cargo steamship	Barbro	908	Brødrene Bjørnstad, Sarpsborg
39	1902	Dry cargo steamship	Brighton	1,129	A. F. Klaveness & Co.
40	1902	Steam-powered whaler (50 IHP)	Ørnen	103	Christen Christensen
41	1902	Steam-powered whaler (300 HP)	Suderøy		P. Bogen, Sandefjord
42	1903	Dry cargo steamship	Sagnstad	~2,000 dwt	A. F. Klaveness & Co.
43	1903	Dry cargo steamship	Primula		Ludv. Castberg, Oslo
44	1903	Dry cargo steamship	Joseph de Georgie	1,259	Bernhard Hansen, Flekkefjord
45	1903	Dry cargo steamship (350 HP)	Laboremus	594	O. A. Lindvig
46	1904	Dry cargo steamship	Standard	1,420	Bull & Gjertsen, Tønsberg
47	1903	Dry cargo steamship	Rex	677	A. O. Lindvig
48	1904	Dry cargo steamship	Viking	1,420	O. Danielsen & P. Johannsessen
49	1904	Steam-powered whaler (350 IHP)	Hauken	120	Christen Christensen
50	1904	Dry cargo steamship	Spir	1,417	Hj. Siegwarth, Oslo
51	1904	Steam-powered whaler	Fortuna	164	Compania Argentina de Pesca
52	1905	Steam-powered whaler (501 IHP)	Hellik	1,198	Brødrene Bjørnstad, Sarpsborg
53	1905	Steam-powered whaler	Hjarrand	869	Brødrene Bjørnstad, Sarpsborg
54	1904	Steam-powered whaler	Skramstad	1,400	A. F. Klaveness & Co.
55	1905	Steam-powered whaler	Varg	1,400	O. Danielsen & P. Johannsessen
56	1905	Steam-powered whaler	Almirante Mont	123	A. Andersen, Sandar (Chile)
57	1905	Steam-powered whaler (307 IHP)	Rosita	166	Compania Argentina de Pesca
58	1906	Dry cargo steamship	Standard	1,461	Bull & Gjertsen, Tønsberg
59	1906	Dry cargo steamship	Solstad	1,465	A. F. Klaveness & Co.
60	1906	Dry cargo steamship (900 IHP)	Skjalm	1,485	I. A. Larsen, Skien
61	1907	Dry cargo steamship	Vestfold	1,883	Peder Johannessen, Tønsberg
62	1906	Steam-powered whaler	Alminrante Valenzuela	141	A. Andresen
63	1906	Steam-powered whaler	Svip	126	Christen Christensen
64	1906	Steam-powered whaler	Alminranre Utribe	126	A. Andresen
65	1907	Dry cargo steamship	Nicholas Cuneo	1,051	Bernhard Hansen, Flekkefjord
66	1907	Dry cargo steamship	Vincenzo di Georgia	1,053	Adolph Halvorsen, Bergen
67	1907	Steam-powered whaler	Grib	140	Christen Christensen
68	1907	Steam-powered whaler	Frithjof	125	Christen Christensen
69	1908	Steam-powered whaler	Ravn	133	Christen Christensen
70	1908	Dry cargo steamship (1,400 HP)	Jose	1,522	Bernhard Hansen, Flekkefjord
71	1908	Steam-powered whaler	Karl	138	Compania Argentina de Pesca
72	1908	Passenger steamship	Huvik II		Anton Johanson, Sandar
73	1908	Steam-powered whaler	Erling	122	Erling Lund, Oslo
74	1908	Steam-powered whaler	Ronashill	121	Chr. Nielsen & Co. Larvik
75	1908	Dry cargo steamship	Jason	295	A/S Salvator, Bergen
76	1908	Dry cargo steamship	San Sebastian	306	Otto Thoresen, Oslo
77	1908	Steam-powered whaler	Frig	128	P. Bogen & P. Mikkelsen
78	1908	Steam-powered whaler	Frey	128	P. Bogen & P. Mikkelsen
79	1909	Steam-powered whaler	Penguin	169	Chr. Nielsen & Co. Larvik
80	1909	Steam-powered whaler	Pelican	168	Chr. Nielsen & Co. Larvik
81	1910	Steam-powered whaler (300 IHP)	Havørn	121	Christen Christensen
82	1910	Steam-powered whaler (700+800 IHP)	Don Ernesto	221	Compania Argentina de Pesca
83	1911	Steam-powered whaler (500 IHP)	Norrøna II	170	P. Bogen
84	1911	Steam-powered whaler (330 IHP)	Fyr	129	Lars Christensen
85	1911	Steam-powered whaler (330 IHP)	Don Luis	128	Lars Christensen
86	1916	Steam-powered whaler (330 IHP)	La Victoire	114	French
87	1914	Barque-steamship (330 IHP)	Endurance (Polaris)	348	Lars Christensen, Adrien de Gerlache
88	1912	Steam-powered whaler (84 NHP)	Almiranta Goni	168	A. Andersen, Sandar (Chile)
89	1912	Steam-powered whaler (84 NHP)	Tangalane	175	Thøger Andresen, Larvik
90	1912	Steam-powered whaler (84 NHP)	Peguena	176	Thøger Andresen, Larvik
91	1914	Dry cargo steamship (550 IHP)	Othem	687	Arthur de Reitz, Gothenburg
92	1918	Dry cargo steamship (385 IHP)	Vard	692	Jac. Jacobsen
93	1919	Dry cargo motor ship (320 IHP)	Lita	672	C. T. Gogstad, Oslo
94	1920	Dry cargo steamship (1,552 IHP)	Cissy	2,167	Torp & Wiese
95	1922	Barge	N. A. L. 20	193	Norwegian America Line
96	1923	Barge	N. A. L. 21	193	Norwegian America Line
97	1923	Dry cargo motor ship (160 IHP)	Guri	219	Norwegian America Line
98	1923	Dry cargo motor ship (160 IHP)	Kari	219	Norwegian America Line
99	1923	Steam-powered whaler (700 IHP)	Klo	211	Søren L. Christensen
100	1924	Steam-powered whaler (700 IHP)	Neb	225	Søren L. Christensen
101	1925	Steam-powered whaler (700 IHP)	Havørn	224	Søren L. Christensen
102	1925	Steam-powered whaler	Grib	222	Søren L. Christensen
103	1926	Steam-powered whaler (796 IHP)	Hauken	249	Søren L. Christensen
104	1926	Steam-powered whaler (745 IHP)	Gvas 2	249	Søren L. Christensen
105	1921	Passenger (electrical)	Framæs II	84	A/S Framnæs mek Værksted
106	1930	Diesel-powered tug (360 IHP)	David	114	A/S Framnæs mek Værksted
107	1932	Steam-powered whaler (753 IHP)	Femern	257	A/S Thor Dahl
108	1932	Steam-powered whaler (753 IHP)	Sydostlandet	257	A/S Thor Dahl
109	1934	Dry cargo steamship (569 IHP)	Framnæs	1,000	Axel Brostrøm og søn
110	1935	Dry cargo steamship (1,200 HP)	Hjalmar Wessel	1,743	The Kelner-Parlington
111	1935	Steam-powered whaler (1,200 HP)	Blauberg	307	The Kerguelson Sealing
112	1935	Steam-powered whaler (1,300 HP)	Cedarberg	307	The Kerguelson Sealing
113	1936	Steam-powered whaler (1,286 IHP)	Scott	305	Frango Corporation
114	1936	Steam-powered whaler (1,335 IHP)	Amos	305	Frango Corporation
115	1937	School ship, Full-rigged	Christian Radich	676	Oslo school ship
116	1936	Steam-powered whaler (1,265 IHP)	Kos XIX	305	Anders Jahre
117	1936	Steam-powered whaler (1,288 IHP)	Clifford	305	Frango Corporation
118	1938	Motor ship (4,279 IHP)	Thorstrand	3,041	A/S Thor Dahl
119	1937	Steam-powered whaler (1,295 IHP)	Klo	307	A/S Thor Dahl
120	1937	Steam-powered whaler (1,382 IHP)	Falk	307	A/S Thor Dahl
121	1937	Steam-powered whaler (1,189 IHP)	Syvern	307	A/S Thor Dahl
122	1938	Dry cargo motor ship (1,760 IHP)	Thor I	2,502	A/S Thor Dahl
123	1939	Steam-powered whaler (1,348 IHP)	Thorgaut	313	A/S Thor Dahl
124	1940	Motor ship (4,600 IHP)	Jasmin	2,956	Anders Jahre
125	1940	Motor ship (4,600 IHP)	Moshild	2,959	Martin Mosvold
126	1946	Dry cargo motor ship (2x3,325 BHP)	Castleville	6,080	A. F. Klaveness & Co.
127	1948	Dry cargo motor ship (2x3,325 BHP)	Francisville	6,087	A. F. Klaveness & Co.
128	1941	Steam-powered whaler (1,233 IHP)	Gaupe (Kaernten)	325	A/S Thor Dahl
129	1941	Steam-powered whaler (1,302 IHP)	Niern (Nordkap)	323	A/S Thor Dahl
130	1941	Steam-powered whaler (1,236 IHP)	Nor V (Sudetenland)	323	Melsom & Melsom
131	1941	Steam-powered whaler (1,230 IHP)	Hauk (Cimber)	323	A/S Thor Dahl
132	1942	Steam-powered whaler (1,219 IHP)	Thorglimt (Seewolf)	323	Bryd & Dahl
133	1942	Steam-powered whaler (1,263 IHP)	Krill (Waage)	323	
134	1943	Steam-powered whaler (1,262 IHP)	Alk	323	Admiral Norwegen
135	1943	Steam-powered whaler (1,175 IHP)	Ravn (Orion)	323	A/S Thor Dahl
136	1944	Steam-powered Tug (1,600 IHP)	Rosfjord	566	Admiral Norwegen
137	1950	Motor ship (3,625 BHP)	Ocean Queen	2,523	Jacob Christensen
138	1947	Steam-powered whaler (1,655 IHP)	Kos 32	511	A/S Kosmos, Anders Jahre
139	1947	Steam-powered whaler (1,586 IHP)	Kos 31	511	A/S Kosmos, Anders Jahre
140	1948	Steam-powered whaler (1,435 IHP)	Wilfrid Fearnhead	530	Union Whaling Co., Ltd
141	1948	Steam-powered whaler (1,750 IHP)	Sidney Smith	530	Union Whaling Co., Ltd
142	1950	Motor ship (3,625 BHP)	Helena	2,529	William Hansen
143	1950	Steam-powered whaler (2,025 IHP)	Thorgard	536	A/S Thor Dahl
144	1950	Steam-powered whaler (2,000 IHP)	Panter	541	A/S Thor Dahl
145	1950	Steam-powered whaler (1,821 IHP)	Globe XIII	541	Melsom & Melsom
146	1952	Motor tanker (7,350 IHP)	Grepa	9,957	Leif Erichsens Rederi A/S
147	1953	Motor tanker (7,350 IHP)	Emerald	9,951	Willy Oppens rederi A/S
148	1951	Steam-powered whaler (1,860 IHP)	Enern	548	A/S Thor Dahl
149	1951	Steam-powered whaler (1,814 IHP)	Femern	548	A/S Thor Dahl
150	1954	Motor tanker (7,350 IHP)	Adderley Sleigh	9,941	Svend Foyn Bruun, Jr.
151	1952	Steam-powered whaler (2,300 IHP)	Thorkild	563	A/S Thor Dahl
152	1952	Steam-powered whaler (1,998 IHP)	Thorvard	563	A/S Thor Dahl
153	1955	Motor tanker (8,250 BHP)	Thorshov	10,314	A/S Thor Dahl
154	1956	Motor tanker (8,250 BHP)	Europe	10,370	The Texas Comp. (Norway) A/S
155	1957	Motor tanker (8,250 BHP)	Skaraas	10,331	Skipsaktieselskapet Nanset
156	1956	Motor tanker (490 BHP)	Østskjell	283	A/S Marian
157	1956	Motor tanker (490 BHP)	Vestskjell	298	Lorentzens kysttank rederi A/S
158	1958	Dry/refrigerated cargo motor ship (7,800 BHP)	Thorshope	5,758	A/S Thor Dahl
159	1959	Dry/refrigerated cargo motor ship (7,800 BHP)	Thorsriver	5,760	A/S Thor Dahl
160 A	1960	Dry/refrigerated cargo motor ship (7,500 BHP)	Thorstream	5,758	A/S Thor Dahl
161 A	1962	Bulk carrier motor ship (6,300 BHP)	Ross Mount	11,006	Rosshavet
162	1964	Motor ship (8,400 BHP)	Thorsdrott	5,711	A/S Thor Dahl
163	1963	Diesel-powered fishing vessel (495 BHP)	Engey	192	Hradfrystistødin H/F
164	1964	Diesel-powered fishing vessel (660 BHP)	Bjarmi II	239	Rødull H/F
165	1964	Diesel-powered fishing vessel (660 BHP)	Sulan	234	Leo Sigurdson
166	1964	Motor ship (8,400 BHP)	Thorsøy	5,711	A/S Thor Dahl
167	1964	Diesel-powered fishing vessel (2x600 BHP)	Reykjaborg	336	Reykjaborg H/F
168	1965	Motor ship (8,400 BHP)	Golar Fruit	5,715	Gotaas Larsen ING.
169	1965	Motor ship (8,400 BHP)	Golar Tryg	5,775	Trygve Gotaas
170	1966	Dry cargo motor ship (3,500 BHP)	Fossum	3,879	Løvenskjold Høyer
171	1967	Dry/refrigerated cargo motor ship (13,800 BHP)	Thorswave	10,133	A/S Thor Dahl
172	1966	Dry cargo motor ship (3500 BHP)	Eielert Rinde	3,879	A/S Trælandafos
173	1967	Dry cargo motor ship (3500 BHP)	Ole Rinde	3,879	A/S Vafos Brug
174	1968	Motor ship (8,400 BHP)	Thorstind	5,711	A/S Thor Dahl
175	1969	LPG motor ship (6,900 BHP)	Mudogas Atlantic	6,804	Eivind Lorentzen
176	1970	Cargo/wine motor ship (11,900 BHP)	Norbella	11,538	Compagnie Maritime des Chargeurs Reunis
177	1971	Cargo/wine motor ship (11,900 BHP)	Norlanda	11,538	Compagnie Maritime des Chargeurs Reunis
178	1971	Roll-on/roll-off motor ship (2x6,000 BHP)	Tor Gothia	4,128	Triport Shipping Co Ltd.
179	1972	Roll-on/roll-off motor ship (2x6,000 BHP)	Tor Belgia	4,128	Triport Shipping Co Ltd.
180	1972	Roll-on/roll-off motor ship (2x6,000 BHP)	Tor Nerlandia	4,128	Triport Shipping Co Ltd.
181	1973	Roll-on/roll-off motor ship (2x6,000 BHP)	Tor Dania	4,128	Tor Line AB
N - 101	1973	Semi-submersible drill (4x1,950/1x975)	Norskald	8,273	ks Gotaas Larsen explo. As & co/& Rowan inc.
182	1974	Roll-on/roll-off motor ship (2x6,000 BHP)	Tor Finlandia	4,162	Sven Christer Salen P/R
TF - 102	1974	Semi-submersible drill (4x2,200 HP)	Dyvi Alpha	8,192	K/S Dyvi Drilling A/S & Co
183	1975	Roll-on/roll-off motor ship (2x6,000 BHP)	Melbourne Trader	4,452	Australian National Line
TF - 103	1975	Semi-submersible drill (4x2,200 HP)	Ross Rig	7,635	Ross Rig A/S P/R
184	1975	Motor ship (13,200 BHP)	Heinrich Heine	4,865	VEB Deutfracht Seerederei
185	1975	Motor ship (13,200 BHP)	Theodor Körner	4,865	VEB Deutfracht Seerederei
TF - 104	1976	Semi-submersible drill (4x2,200 HP)	Nortroll	7,644	K/S Golar Nor Oceanics A/S & Co.
TF - 105	1976	Semi-submersible drill (4x2,200 HP)	Nordraug	7,627	K/S Munkenes Drilling A/S & Co.
186	1976	Roll-on/roll-off motor ship (2x6,000 BHP)	Union Hobart	4,128	Union Steamships of New Zealand Ltd.
187	1977	Roll-on/roll-off motor ship (2x6,000 BHP)	Union Lyttelton	4,128	Lulworth Co. Ltd.
188	1978	Rail ferry motor ship (2x8,800 BHP)	Geroite na Sevastopol	9,603	State Shipping Corp.
189	1977	Roll-on/roll-off motor ship (2x6,000 BHP)	Tor Caledonia	5,506	Whitwill Cole & Co. Ltd.
190	1978	Passenger/car ferry (4x1,150 BHP)	Bastø I	2476	A/S Alpha
191	1979	Motor ship (20,100 BHP)	Hilco Sprinter	9,065	K/S Hilco Sprinter A/S & Co
192	1979	Motor ship (20,100 BHP)	Hilco Speedster	9,065	K/S Hilco Speedster A/S & Co
193	1980	Motor ship (20,100 BHP)	Hilco Scamper	9,065	K/S Hilco Scamper A/S & Co
194	1981	Motor ship (20,100 BHP)	Hilco Skier	9,065	K/S Hilco Skier A/S & Co
195	1981	Motor ship (14,000 BHP)	Hilco Scater	9,172	K/S Hilco Scater A/S & Co
196	1982	Pipe carrier/supply motor ship (2x2,652 BHP)	Magnus Viking	1,451	Viking Supply Skips
PF - 106	1982	Semi-submersible drill (4x2,585 BHP)	Drill Star	8,490	Cariba Ships Corp. Ltd.
197	1983	Pipe carrier/supply motor ship (2x2,652 BHP)	Martin Viking	1,450	Viking Supply Skips
198	1983	Fireboat motor ship (4x3,060 BHP)	Aldoma	1,615	Sudoimport Moskva USSR
PF - 107	1983	Semi-submersible drill (4x2,585 BHP)	Bow Drill II	14,586	Bow Valley Offshore Drilling Ltd.
199	1984	Motor ship (4x2,100 KW)	Seaway Harrier	4,762	K/S Stolt-Nielsen Seaway
200	1986	Motor ship (4,000 BHP)	Seaway Pelican	4,479	K/S Nevi-SNS Diver VII

Notes to the table:

1. NHP = Nominal horse power
2. LPG = Liquid Petroleum Gas

== Sources ==
- Lardex - ships built 1
- Lardex - ships built 2
- Lardex - Ships built complete (Norwegian)
