= Kristian Krefting =

Norwegian footballer, military officer, chemical engineer and company owner

Kristian August Krefting
- Born: 9 February 1891; Kristiania, Norway
- Died: 13 April 1964 (aged 73); The Boltons, London, United Kingdom
- Burial place: Tanum Church in Tanum, Norway
- Spouse: Dagny Boe (m. 1925)
- Relatives: Rudolf Krefting (father)
- Military career
- Allegiance: Norway
- Branch: Norwegian Army
- Service years: 1914–1928; 1940–1946
- Rank: Lieutenant colonel
- Unit: Norwegian Armed Forces in exile (1940–1945)
- Conflicts: Second World War: Norwegian campaign
- Awards: Knight First Class of the Order of St. Olav; Haakon VII 70th Anniversary Medal
- Other work: Footballer, chemical engineer, businessman

Kristian August Krefting (9 February 1891 – 13 April 1964) was a Norwegian footballer, military officer, chemical engineer and company owner. He was Norwegian champion with the club Lyn in 1910 and 1911, and was on the Norway national football team at the 1912 Summer Olympics.

Emigrating to the United Kingdom in the 1920s, to start a manufacturing business in the ink industry; Krefting returned to military service during the Second World War. Having first been attached to British forces as a liaison officer in the Norwegian campaign in 1940, he spent the rest of the war in the administration of the exiled Norwegian forces in the United Kingdom. Returning to his ink business post-war, Krefting was a Norwegian attaché at the 1948 Summer Olympics in London.

== Personal life ==
Kristian Krefting was born on 9 February 1891, in Kristiania, the son of medical doctor Rudolf Krefting and the Swedish-born Märtha Bergitte Amelie Trozelli. On 19 May 1925 he married Dagny Boe in Paris. The couple had three children. He died in his home in The Boltons, London, in 1964. His urn was brought to Norway and interred at Tanum Church in Tanum, where many other members of the Krefting family are buried.

== Sports career ==
Krefting played football for the club Viking in 1904–1908, before transferring to Lyn in 1909. He also played for the Norway national football team. He was Norwegian champion with Lyn in 1910 and 1911. He made his début for the national team in 1911, in a match against Sweden. In 1912 he played four matches for the Norwegian team; a total of five caps for Norway during his career. He competed at the 1912 Summer Olympics in Stockholm, where the Norwegian team lost the quarter final against Denmark, and thereafter lost the consolation game against Austria. In addition to playing football, he was also an active skier.

== Military and civilian career ==
Krefting achieved his examen artium academic certification in 1910. He graduated from the upper section of the Norwegian Military Academy in 1914, joining the 6th Division with the rank of first lieutenant. He first served with the infantry of the 2nd Brigade. He graduated as a chemical engineer from the Norwegian Institute of Technology in 1918. He was employed as manager of Jacobsens farvefabrikk in 1919–1923, and later manager of Alna chemiske fabrikker. In 1925, he founded the company British Printing Ink Co. Ltd. in London, which manufactured and supplied printing ink and dye to several English newspapers. He also founded the company Deutsche Rotationsfarben in Berlin in 1928. Honourably discharged from the Norwegian Army in 1928, he was promoted to the rank of captain two years later, in 1930. Settled in London, he chaired the gentlemen's club Den Norske Klub for several years.

== Second World War ==
Having served in the Norwegian Army prior to emigrating to the United Kingdom, Krefting returned to active service following the German invasion of Norway in April 1940. Krefting participated in the Norwegian campaign as a liaison officer, attached to the British 148th Infantry Brigade when it deployed to fight the German forces that had landed in Norway. At the time of the campaign, Krefting held the rank of captain. After following the 148th Infantry Brigade on its deployment to the Moelv area in Eastern Norway, Krefting was ordered by the Norwegian High Command to return to the United Kingdom to join the Norwegian Military Mission there. The Norwegian Military Mission had as its task to mobilize Norwegians in the United Kingdom for service with the Norwegian forces fighting in Northern Norway. Before any units of expatriate and emigrant Norwegians could be formed and trained, the campaign in Norway ended in June 1940, and the Norwegian government evacuated to the United Kingdom. After the end of the fighting in Norway, Krefting worked on personnel issues for the exiled armed forces and the Norwegian merchant navy.

In 1941 Krefting was promoted to the rank of major. From 1942 onwards he served at the Norwegian Army Command, where he was responsible for the administration of the army's facilities in London, from 1944 holding the rank of lieutenant colonel. During his time serving with the exiled Norwegian forces, Krefting was a personal friend of foreign minister Trygve Lie. At the end of the Second World War, Krefting was in charge of disbanding the Norwegian Armed Forces' presence in the United Kingdom. He left Norwegian Army service for the final time in March 1946.

== Honours and awards ==
Krefting was decorated Knight, First Class of the Order of St. Olav for his work as an Olympic attaché at the 1948 Summer Olympics in London. He was also awarded the Haakon VII 70th Anniversary Medal for his wartime military service and the Norwegian Engineers' Association honour badge for his professional work, as well as receiving a number of foreign decorations.
