= Anton Fredrik Klaveness (1903–1981) =

Norwegian equestrian

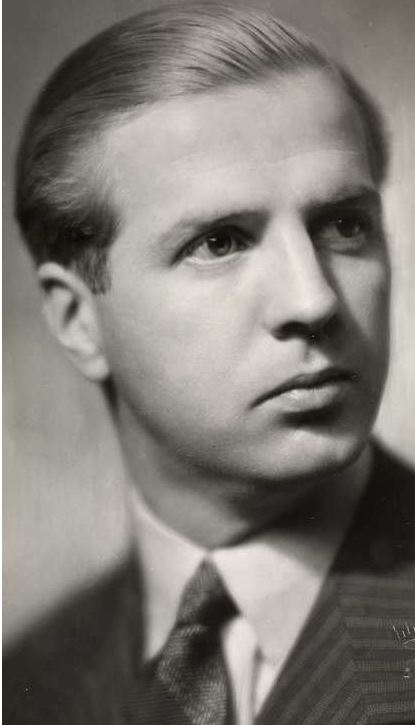
Anton pictured in 1930, two years after his participation in the Olympics.

Anton Klaveness (8 November 1903 – 15 April 1981) was a Norwegian equestrian and ship-owner.

== Personal life ==
He was born in Sandefjord as a son of ship-owner Anton Fredrik Klaveness (1874–1958) and Therese Grøn (1875–1948). He was a brother of ship-owner Dag Klaveness, brother-in-law of Johan H. Andresen, nephew of Johan Karsten Rasmussen, first cousin once removed of Thoralv, Thorvald and Wilhelm Klaveness, grandnephew of Henrik and Thorvald Klaveness and second cousin of Kristen and Torvald Faye Klaveness.

In 1938 he married Brita Zahle (1912–1974). Before that he had been married to Lucy Egeberg (1907–1992).

== Career ==
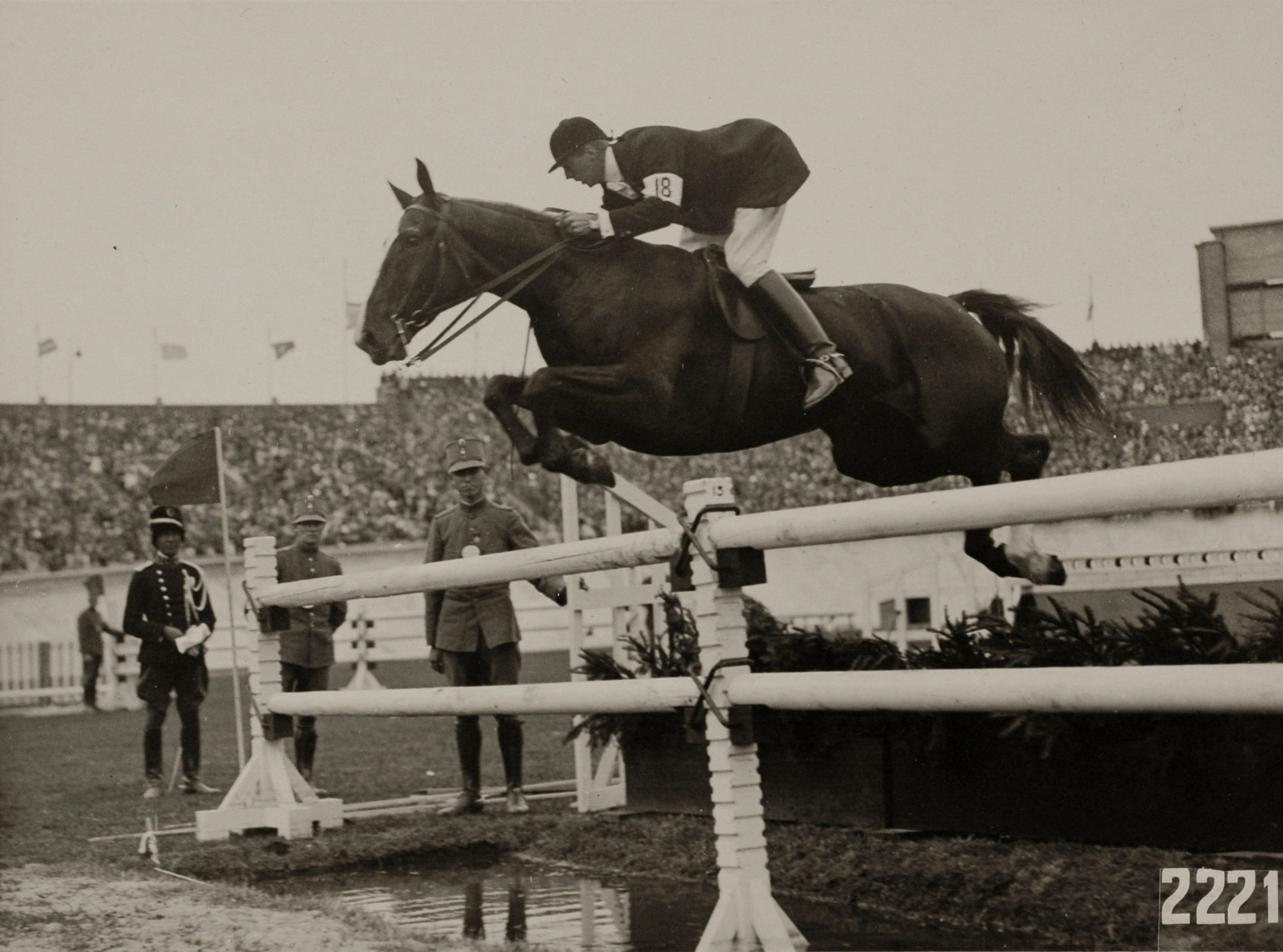
Klaveness in 1928

He competed in equestrianism at the 1928 Summer Olympics in Amsterdam, where he placed 32nd in individual show jumping and 11th in the team contest. He later chaired the Norwegian Jockey Club.

After middle school, commerce school (Oslo Handelsgymnasium) and business training abroad he was hired in his father's shipping company A. F. Klaveness & Co in 1923. He also became a board member in 1934 and chaired the board from 1947. He was a national and central board member of the Norwegian Shipowners' Association, chaired the Norwegian board of Nordisk Defence Club and Framnæs Mekaniske Værksted.

He chaired the boards of Forsikringsselskapet Vega and Norske Shell, the supervisory councils of Otto Thoresen Shipping Co, Sydvaranger, Andresens Bank and Det Norske Veritas. Klaveness was also an elected member of Bærum municipal council from 1935 to 1937.

Klaveness was decorated as a Knight, First Class of the Order of St. Olav in 1961, Knight of the Order of Vasa and Officer of the Order of Orange-Nassau.
