= Carsten Henrik Bruun =

Norwegian whaler (1828–1907)

- Born: 1828; Risør
- Died: 1907 (aged 78–79)
- Occupation: whaler
- Spouse: Maren Sibylle Bull Foyn (1840–1918)
- Parent(s): Mathias Wogen Bruun, Ingeborg Carstensen

Carsten Henrik Carstensen Bruun (1828–1907) was a Norwegian whaler.

== Personal life ==
He was born in Risør as a son of Mathias Wogen Bruun (1791–1858) and Ingeborg Carstensen (1794–1882). His wife was a relative of founding father Henrik Carstensen.

In 1859 he married Maren Sibylle Bull Foyn (1840–1918), a daughter of Laurentius Føyn Jr and niece of noted whaler Svend Foyn. They had three sons and two daughters. Their second son Carsten Henrik Bruun Jr. was a chief executive, and their third son Svend Foyn Bruun was a naval officer, ship-owner, whaler and politician. Through the latter, Carsten Bruun was a grandfather of Svend Foyn Bruun Jr.

== Career ==
Bruun was involved in whaling and sealing from 1851. was a shipmaster of whaling vessels, including Isbjørn which belonged to Svend Foyn and Harald Haarfagre which belonged to Tho. Joh. Heftye. For the company Tho. Joh. Heftye between 1872 and 1879 he participated, as the first Norwegian, in whaling in the Baffin Bay. In the company Bruuns Hvalfangerselskap he was the owner of the ship Immanuel. The company had whaling stations in Sør-Varanger Municipality and Båtsfjord Municipality, and participated in the extinction of whales in Varangerfjorden. His ventures in Finnmark lasted from 1881 to 1899. Bruun received a gold medal from the French Academy and was decorated as a Knight of the Royal Norwegian Order of St. Olav.
