= Carsten Henrik Bruun Jr. =

Norwegian sport shooter (1868–1951)

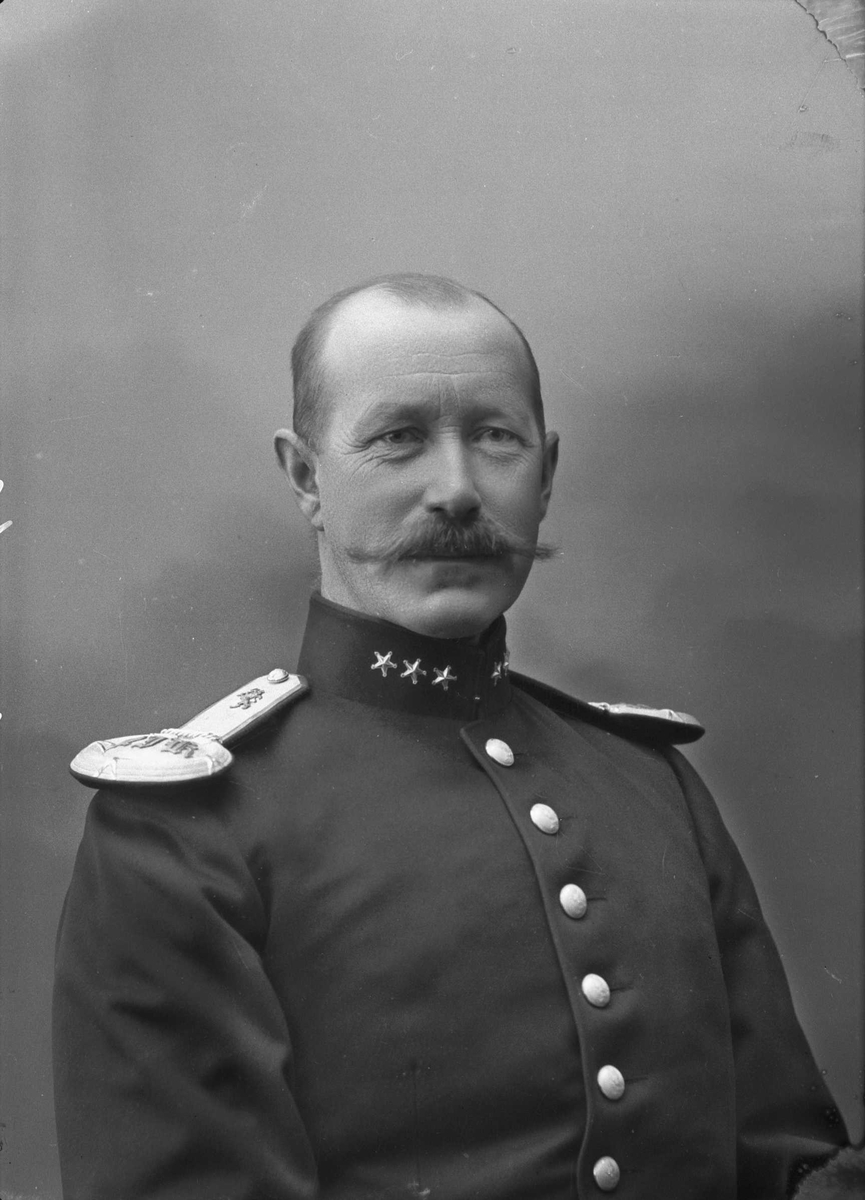
- Carsten Henrik Bruun (1904)
- Born: 7 November 1868; Tønsberg
- Died: 16 July 1951 (aged 82)
- Occupations: sport shooter and businessperson
- Spouse: Esther Larsen
- Parent(s): Carsten Henrik Bruun, Maren Sibylle Bull Foyn

Carsten Henrik Bruun (7 November 1868 – 16 July 1951) was a Norwegian military officer, sport shooter and businessperson.

He was born in Tønsberg as the second son of ship-owner Carsten Henrik Carstensen Bruun (1828–1907) and Maren Sibylle Bull Foyn (1840–1918). He was an older brother of Svend Foyn Bruun, and as such an uncle of Svend Foyn Bruun Jr. On the paternal side he was a great-grandnephew of founding father Henrik Carstensen, and on the maternal side he was a grandson of Laurentius Føyn Jr, who was a brother of noted whaler Svend Foyn.

He was married to Esther Larsen (1872–1940).

He was a major in the Norwegian Army infantry. He was chief executive officer of Elektricitets-Aktieselskabet AEG, the Norwegian branch of German company Allgemeine Elektricitäts-Gesellschaft (AEG). He also had a sporting career. At the age of 43, he participated in the men's trap competition at the 1912 Summer Olympics. He finished in joint 27th place. For his achievements, he was decorated as a Knight of the Royal Norwegian Order of St. Olav.
