= Hans Jørgen Darre Hirsch =

Norwegian barrister and writer (1911–1922)

Hans Jørgen Darre Hirsch (19 October 1911 – 21 July 1992) was a Norwegian barrister and shipping executive.

He was born in Vestre Aker as a son of engineer Worm Hirsch (1872–1922) and Signe Jenssen (1875–1969). In 1942 he married Vesla Poulsson.

He finished his secondary education in 1929 and Oslo Commerce School in 1930, and graduated with the cand.jur. degree from the Royal Frederick University in 1935. He was a deputy judge from 1936 to 1938. He was then hired as an attorney in the Norwegian Employers' Confederation, where he was consultant from 1942. From 1948 he was also a barrister, with access to work with Supreme Court cases. He became chief executive of Skibsfartens Arbeidsgiverforening and doubled as chief executive of the Norwegian Shipowners' Association from 1956. He retired in 1976.

He chaired the board of Bennett Reisebureau and Rogalandsbanken Oslo and the supervisory council of Wilh. Wilhelmsen. He was also a supervisory council member in Storebrand.

He received the Defence Medal 1940–1945, and was decorated as a Knight, First Class of the Order of St. Olav (1965), Order of the Dannebrog and Order of the Lion of Finland, as well as Commander of the Order of Vasa. He resided in Ullern. He died in 1992.

Business positions
Preceded by	Chief executive of the Norwegian Shipowners' Association; 1956–1976	Succeeded by David Vikøren
