= Svend Foyn Bruun Sr. =

Norwegian politician and naval officer

Svend Foyn Bruun Sr. (1 December 1883 – 31 May 1956) was a Norwegian naval officer, ship-owner and whaler, and politician for the Conservative Party. He ran the company Bruun & von der Lippe from 1919 to 1945, co-founded Kosmos and was a four-term member of the Parliament of Norway.

== Personal life ==
He was born in Tønsberg as a son of ship-owner Carsten Henrik Carstensen Bruun (1828–1907) and Maren Sibylle Bull Foyn (1840–1918). He was a younger brother of Carsten Henrik Bruun Jr. On the paternal side he was a great-grandnephew of founding father Henrik Carstensen, and on the maternal side he was a grandson of Laurentius Føyn Jr, born 1807, who was a brother of noted whaler Svend Foyn.

Together with Ellen Bruusgaard (1887–1969) he had two daughters and two sons. The son Svend Foyn Bruun Jr. followed in his career footsteps.

== Career ==
After middle school he studied for a short time in France and Oxford and attended the Norwegian Naval Academy. In the Royal Norwegian Navy he was a Lieutenant from 1904, Premier Lieutenant from 1908 and Captain from 1920. He participated in the Norwegian neutrality guard during World War I. In his civil career, he was a shipmate from 1906 and shipmaster from 1907 to 1911. From 1911 to 1914 he participated in whaling expeditions off the coast of Africa. He inherited Aker farm in Sem in 1916, but definitely entered shipping in 1919 when he founded the company Bruun & von der Lippe. He had the company together with Anton Barth von der Lippe. Also, Lippe, Bruun and Anders Jahre together founded the three whaling companies Antarctic, Globus and Kosmos in 1928. The company lasted until 1945, when Bruun started his own shipping and whaling company.

From 1919 to 1925 Bruun was a member of Sem municipal council, the last three years in the executive committee. He was elected to the Parliament of Norway from Vestfold in 1924, 1927, 1930 and 1933, serving four terms. He chaired the county branch of his party and was a member of the central board and national board.

He also chaired his county branch of the Norwegian Association of Hunters and Anglers. He was a board member of Tønsberg Sparebank and Tønsberg Papirindustri. He chaired the supervisory council of Oiltank and was a supervisory council member of Afrika A/S and from 1933 to 1938 in Morgenbladet. He was decorated with the Order of the Polar Star. He died in 1956.
