= Johan Karsten Rasmussen =

Norwegian lawyer, whaler and politician

Johan Karsten Rasmussen (11 January 1878 – 1966) was a Norwegian lawyer, whaler and politician.

== Personal life ==
He was born in Stavanger as a son of shipmaster Johan Rasmussen (1843–1891) and Caroline Kannik (1843–1932). In 1907 he married Berit Klaveness. He thereby became a son-in-law of Anton Fredrik Klaveness and brother-in-law of Anton Fredrik Klaveness, Jr and Dag Klaveness.

== Career ==
Rasmussen finished his secondary education in 1896 and graduated from the Royal Frederick University with the cand.jur. degree in 1901. He settled in Sandefjord to work as an attorney. From 1908 to 1912 he represented a large Swedish bank, and was also chief executive of Holms Hattefabrik. In 1913 he entered the shipping and whaling business. He was the manager of Rasmussen & Moe's Rederi, as a partner of Torger Moe. They owned the ship holding companies Vestfold and Sydhavet, and represented The Viking Whaling Co. and Vestfold Whaling Co. in London. Rasmussen also owned the ship holding company Rosshavet with Magnus Konow.

He was a board member of Framnæs mekaniske Værksted from 1915, chaired the Den norske Hvalfangerforening from 1918 to 1929 and the whalers' insurance company Hvalfangernes Assuranceforening. He also sat on national public commissions on whaling.

He was a member of the municipal council of Sandar Municipality from 1937 to 1937, during which time he served as mayor from 1920 to 1929. He served as consul for Sweden from 1920, and was decorated as a Knight of the Order of Vasa.
