= David Vikøren =

Norwegian shipping executive (1926–2022)

David Vikøren (26 September 1926 – 28 March 2022) was a Norwegian shipping executive.

== Biography ==
Vikøren was born in Haugesund. He graduated with the cand.oecon. degree from the University of Oslo in 1951. He worked in Statistics Norway for one year before being hired in the Norwegian Shipowners' Association in 1952. He spent his whole career there, peaking at the position of chief executive from 1977 to 1991.

He has chaired the boards of the Oslo Philharmonic and Hardanger Musikkfest, the councils of the Fridtjof Nansen Institute and the Norwegian Maritime Museum as well as the supervisory council of the Association of Norwegian Theatres and Orchestras, been a board member of TotalFina Norway, Protector Forsikring and the Queen Sonja International Music Competition, and corporate council member of Transocean, the Orkla Group and Nestlé Norge. Ahead of Norway's 1994 EU referendum, he was a member of the European Movement Norway's financial council.

He was decorated as a Commander, First Class of the Order of St. Olav and the Order of the Lion of Finland. He resided in Ullern.

Business positions
| Preceded by Hans Jørgen Darre Hirsch | Chief executive of the Norwegian Shipowners' Association; 1977–1991 | Succeeded by Rolf Sæther |
