= Rolf Sæther =

Norwegian shipping executive and writer (born 1937)

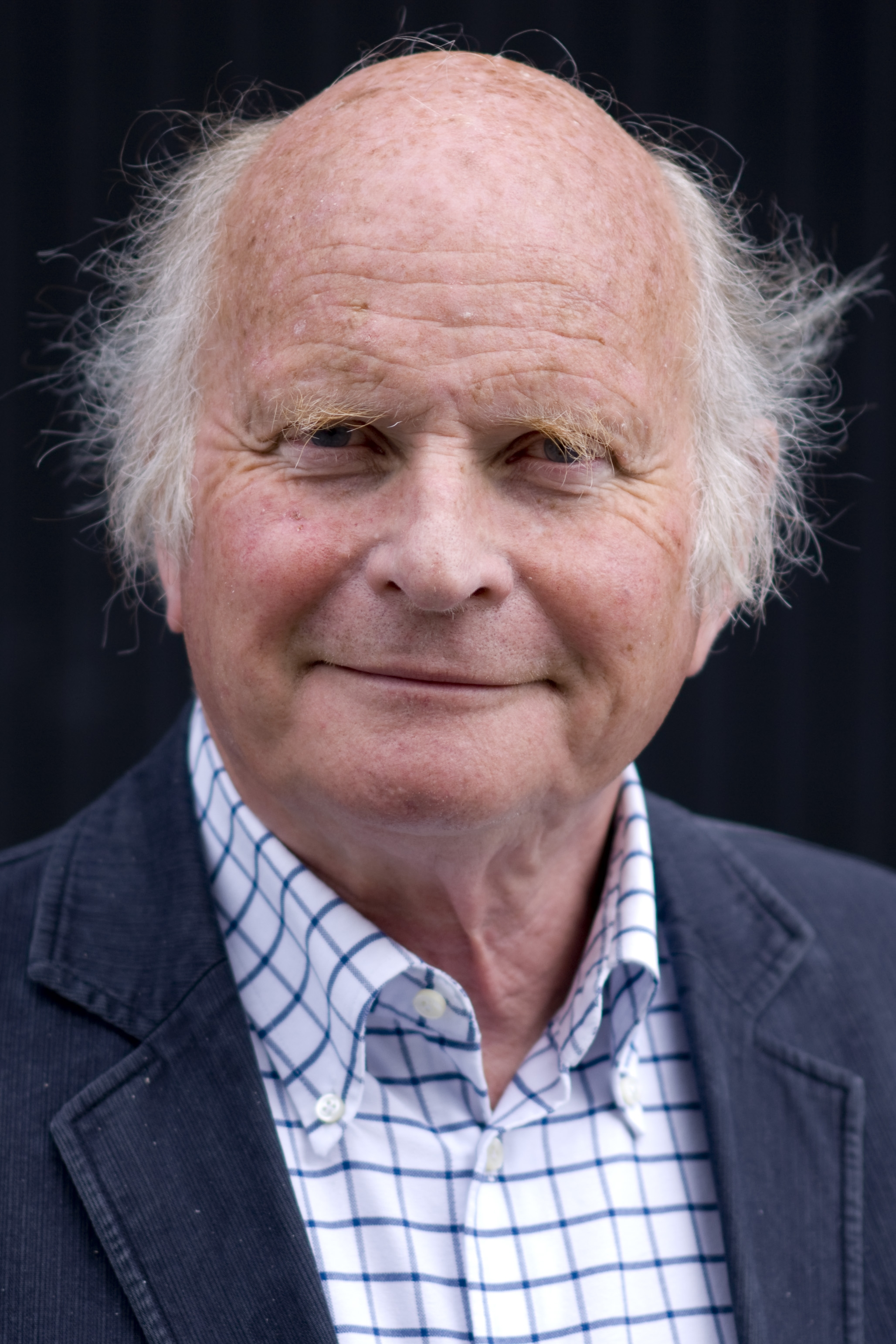
- Rolf Sæther in 2009
- Born: 20 May 1937 (age 88)
- Occupations: Jurist; Civil servant Shipping executive Writer
- Known for: CEO of the Norwegian Shipowners' Association
- Notable work: Tusen dager (2009)

Rolf Sæther (born 20 May 1937) is a Norwegian shipping executive and writer.

He graduated with the cand.jur. degree from the University of Oslo in 1964. After some years as deputy judge in Mandal District Court and civil servant in the Ministry of Transport and Communications, he was hired in the Norwegian Shipowners' Association in 1968. He spent the rest of his career there, peaking at the position of chief executive from 1992 to 2002. He had then been director of international relations since 1980 and vice chief executive since 1985.

He has chaired Folketrygdfondet from 2002 to 2006 as well as the Norwegian Jockey Club, Norsk Rikstoto and the exclusive bibliophiles' society Bibliofilklubben. In 2009, he made a name as a non-fiction writer, when he released the book Tusen dager together with Jo Stein Moen. The book chronicles Norwegian involvement in the Spanish Civil War. The duo followed with Krigen som skapte et bibliotek, issued in 2011 by the Labour Movement Archive and Library, an essay book on the bibliography of the Spanish Civil War.

In 2002, he was decorated as a Knight, First Class of the Order of St. Olav. He resides in Huk.

Business positions
Preceded by David Vikøren	Chief executive of the Norwegian Shipowners' Association; 1992–2002	Succeeded by Marianne Lie
