= Framnaes =

Norwegian engineering company

Grenland Framnæs AS
- Company type: Private company
- Industry: Engineering
- Headquarters: Sandefjord, Norway
- Website: www.hitec-framnes.com

Grenland Framnæs (formerly Hitec Framnæs) is a design and engineering company operating in the oil and gas, marine and process industries. The company headquarters are in Sandefjord and Stavanger, Norway.

At the present time the company concentrates itself in the market for the modification of drilling rigs and production vessels. It also delivers proprietary technology, such as its own design for drilling rigs and production vessels, offshore products, as well as integration of VOC recovery systems on shuttle tankers.

Within process industry, Framnæs provides services in the chemical, petrochemical and pharmaceutical markets. The company has also established operations in the modification market for fixed oil platforms in the North Sea.

== See also ==
- List of ships built at Framnæs shipyard
