= Rudolf Krefting =

Norwegian dermatologist

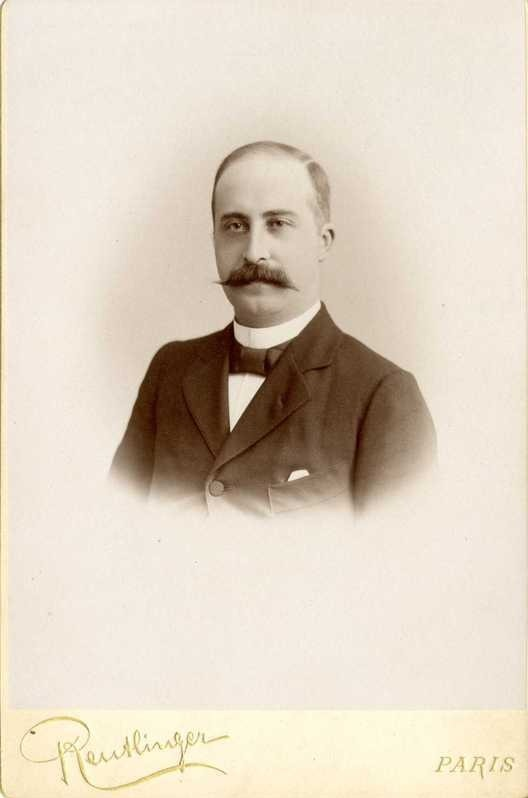
- Born: 3 February 1860; Kvikne, Norway
- Died: 17 August 1942 (aged 82)
- Occupation: Dermatologist
- Known for: Studies of the chancroid and the coccobacillus haemophilus ducreyi
- Children: Kristian Krefting

Rudolf Waldemar Rømeling Krefting (3 February 1860 – 17 August 1942) was a Norwegian dermatologist. He was born in Kvikne Municipality. He is particularly known for his studies of the chancroid and the coccobacillus haemophilus ducreyi. He was the father of Kristian Krefting.
