= Svend Foyn Bruun Jr. =

Norwegian whaler (1926–2008)

Svend Foyn Bruun Jr. (born 1 May 1926 – died 1 November 2008) was a Norwegian ship-owner and whaler.

He was born in Kristiania, as a son of Svend Foyn Bruun (1883–1956) and Ellen Bruusgaard (1887–1969). He was a grandson of Carsten Henrik Bruun and nephew of Carsten Henrik Bruun Jr.

He enrolled in law studies in 1946 and took the cand.jur. degree in 1950. He was a junior solicitor and deputy judge from 1951 to 1956, and from 1956 he was a co-owner of the company Svend Foyn Bruun. He was also chairman of Tønsberg Papirindustri and a board member of Kosmos and Pelagos. He chaired the supervisory council of Kaldnes Mekaniske Verksted, and the corporate council of Kosmos.

In 1953 he was elected chairman of Norges Hvalfangstforbund. He was also a central board member of the Norwegian Shipowners' Association. In Tønsberg, where he lived, he was consul for France from 1957.
