= Christian Wegner Haaland =

Norwegian ship-owner and politician

Christian Wegner Haaland (6 February 1892 – 20 October 1952) was a Norwegian ship-owner and politician for the Conservative Party.

== Biography ==
Haaland was born at Haugesund in Rogaland, Norway. He was the son of Thomas Wegner Christiansen Haaland (1859–1913) and Anna Christine Knudsen (1866–1923). After attending business school in Kristiania, he trained at shipping offices in London. Together with his father-in-law Knut Knutsen, Haaland started a shipping company in 1914. By 1919 he established his own office.

From 1937 to 1940 he was the president of the Norwegian Shipowners' Association. He served as a deputy representative to the Norwegian Parliament from the Market towns of Vest-Agder and Rogaland counties during the term 1945–1949. He was the mayor of Haugesund in 1925, 1928–1931 and 1945.

He was married 1915 to Ida Karoline Knutsen (1894–1948), daughter of shipowner Knut Knutsen (1871–1946) and Elisabeth Tobine Bakke (1867–1957). After Haaland's death in 1952, the company continued under the leadership of his son Thomas Chr. Haaland (1917–75).

== Other sources ==
- Eilertsen, Grete (2016) Rederne og byen. En undersøkelse av rederstandens engasjement i Haugesund ca. 1870-1940 (University of Bergen) ISBN 9788293039389
- Hammerborg, Morten (2003) Skipsfartsbyen: Haugesunds skipsfartshistorie 1850–2000 (Bergen : Eide) ISBN 82-514-0663-3
