= Godthaab (1898) =

Danish steam barquentine

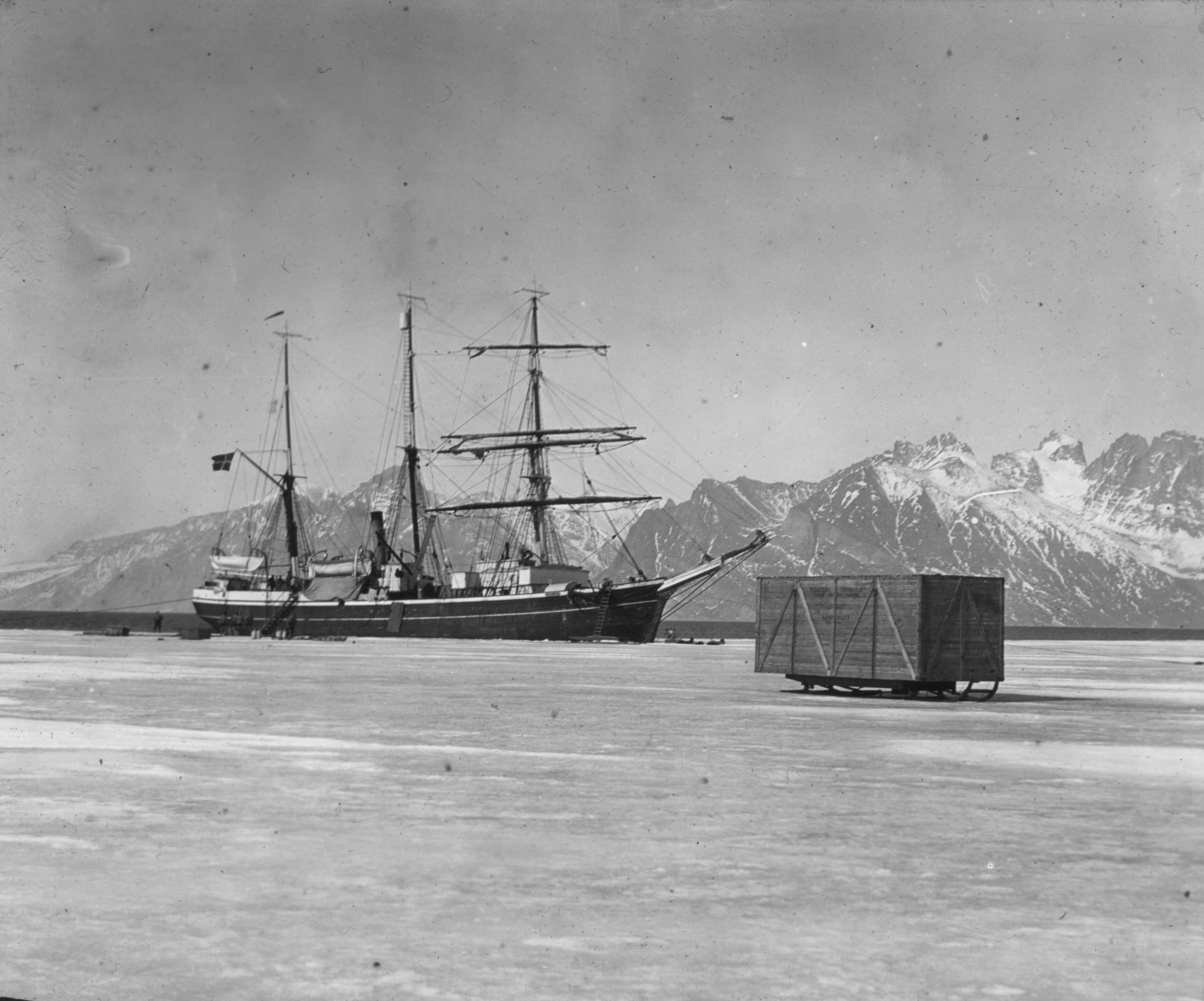
- Godthaab in 1912 in northeastern Greenland

History

Denmark
- Name: Godthaab
- Owner: Royal Greenland Trading Department
- Builder: C. Christensen, Framnäs, Sandefjord, Norway
- Cost: 125,000 DKK
- Launched: 10 January 1898
- Home port: Copenhagen
- Identification: NJWB/OZOA

Faroe Islands (Denmark)
- Name: Hvitabjørn
- Owner: Kjartan Mohr, Torshavn
- Home port: Torshavn
- Identification: XPPS
- Fate: Sunk after fire in 1984

General characteristics
- Class & type: 3-masted steam barquentine
- Length: 35.2 m (115 ft 6 in)
- Beam: 7.65 m (25 ft 1 in)
- Draught: 4.6 m (15 ft 1 in)
- Propulsion: 2-cylinder steam engine, 180 kW (240 hp), Akers, Oslo
- Speed: 6 knots (11 km/h; 6.9 mph) (steam); 8 knots (15 km/h; 9.2 mph) (steam + sail)

SS Godthaab (Danish name for Nuuk) was built in 1897–1898 at C. Christensen ship yard, Sandefjord, Norway, for the Royal Greenland Trading Department and was the company's first steamship. The main task for the ship was sailing on the east Greenland settlement Angmassalik (now Tasiilaq) and was built for that purpose with a 180 kilowatts (240 hp) compound steam engine from Åkers Mechanical Workshop and reinforced hull.

Godthaab served as base for several expeditions in the Arctic, most notably the 1912–1913 Danish Expedition to Queen Louise Land and the expeditions by Lauge Koch between 1926 and 1934. Godthaab sailed for the Royal Greenland Trading Department until the vessel was sold in 1953 to the Faroe Islands. Here the ship was refitted for the herring fishery and renamed Hvitabjørn (polar bear). Hvitabjørn was sunk in 1984 after being badly damaged by fire.

== The Godthaab expedition ==
In 1928 Godthaab undertook a major hydrographical expedition in Baffin Bay and Davis Strait, funded by the Danish Government and the Carlsberg Foundation. This expedition, under the command Eigil Riis-Carstensen, captain in the Royal Danish Navy, studied the oceanography of the Davis Strait and Baffin Bay and closed the last major gap in the surveys of the waters around Greenland. Scientists on the expedition were: Poul Lassenius Kramp (zoology), Paul Marinus Hansen (zoology), Svend Kühnel Hagen (chemistry), Alf Kiilerich (hydrography) and Gunnar Seidenfaden (botany). The expedition completed a number of transects across from the west Greenland Coast to the Canadian coast, sailed 11,000 nautical miles (20,000 km; 13,000 mi) and made measurements at 188 hydrographical stations, down to a maximum depth of 3,500 metres (11,500 ft). Scientific results of the expedition is described in 37 papers, published under a common heading in the journal Meddelelser om Grønland.
