= Christening in Tanum Church =

Painting by Harriet Backer

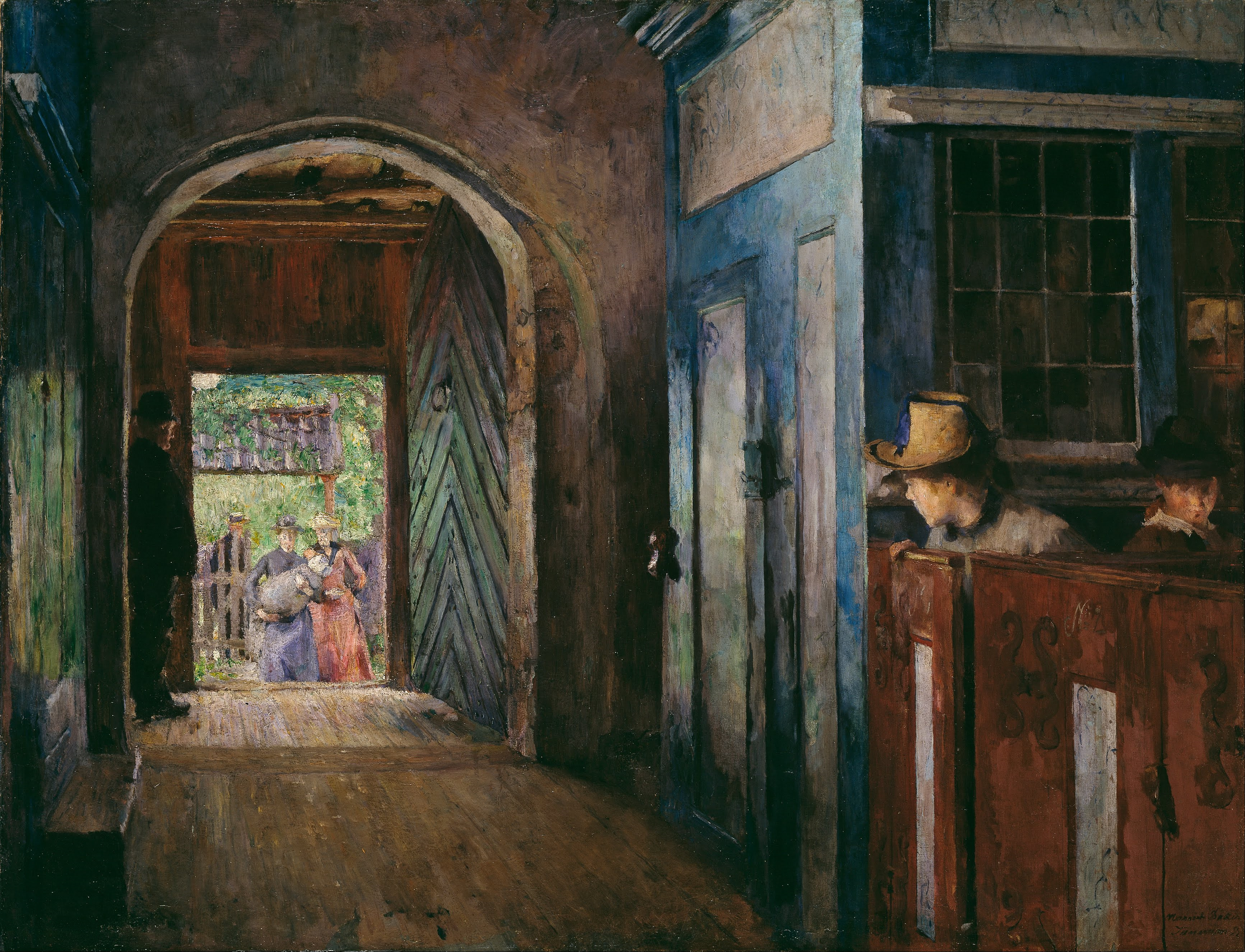
- Artist: Harriet Backer
- Year: 1892
- Medium: Oil on canvas
- Dimensions: 109 cm × 142 cm (43 in × 56 in)
- Location: National Museum of Art, Architecture and Design, Oslo

Christening in Tanum Church (Barnedåp i Tanum kirke) is an oil on canvas painting by the Norwegian artist Harriet Backer. The painting was exhibited at the Autumn Exhibition (Høstutstillingen) in Oslo during 1892. Harriet Backer subsequently exhibited this painting at the Chicago World Exposition in 1893. It is currently on display at the National Museum of Art, Architecture and Design.

The painting shows a scene at Tanum Church in Baerum. In the background are the open doors; the strong daylight flows into the otherwise dark interior. In the doorway stands a group of people about to enter the church. This painting shows a young woman holding a child as she walks into the church for its christening. In the foreground to the right, a woman sitting on the bench at the back of the church turns to look toward the entrance. Beside her sits another woman in the dark.

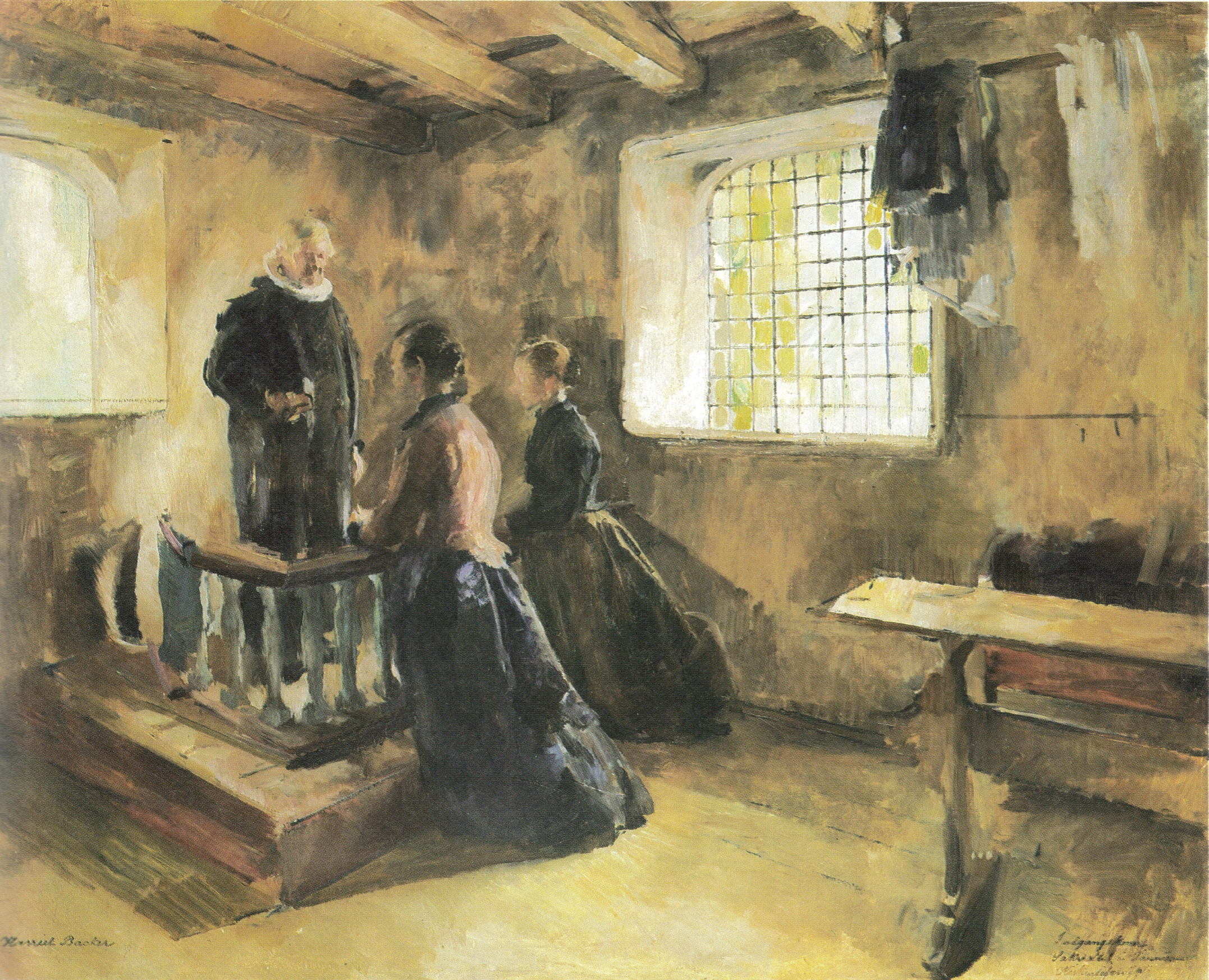
Entrance Wives (1892) Harriet Backer

Harriet Backer studied at the Academy of Fine Arts, Munich, from 1874 to 1878. Between 1878 and 1888, she lived in Paris. In 1888, she moved back to Norway to settle at Sandvika in Bærum. There she began to make a series of paintings based upon local themes. This painting is one of a series of paintings that Backer made featuring church interiors.

Backer also painted another work featuring Tanum Church entitled Entrance Wives (Inngangskoner). This painting shows a traditional local custom where mothers were blessed before attending church services after having given birth. It was painted in the same year and is possibly meant to be seen as a pendant of her Christening. The subdued palette emphasizes the difference between the women bowed in front of a clergyman as opposed to the explosion of colors with the focus on life outside the church.
