= Kapp Klaveness =

Headland in Spitsbergen, Svalbard

Coordinates: 77.3004°N 14.1360°E

Kapp Klaveness is a headland at the west coast of Wedel Jarlsberg Land at Spitsbergen, Svalbard. It is named after ship owner Anton Klaveness.
