= Tanum Church (Bærum) =

- Tanum kirke
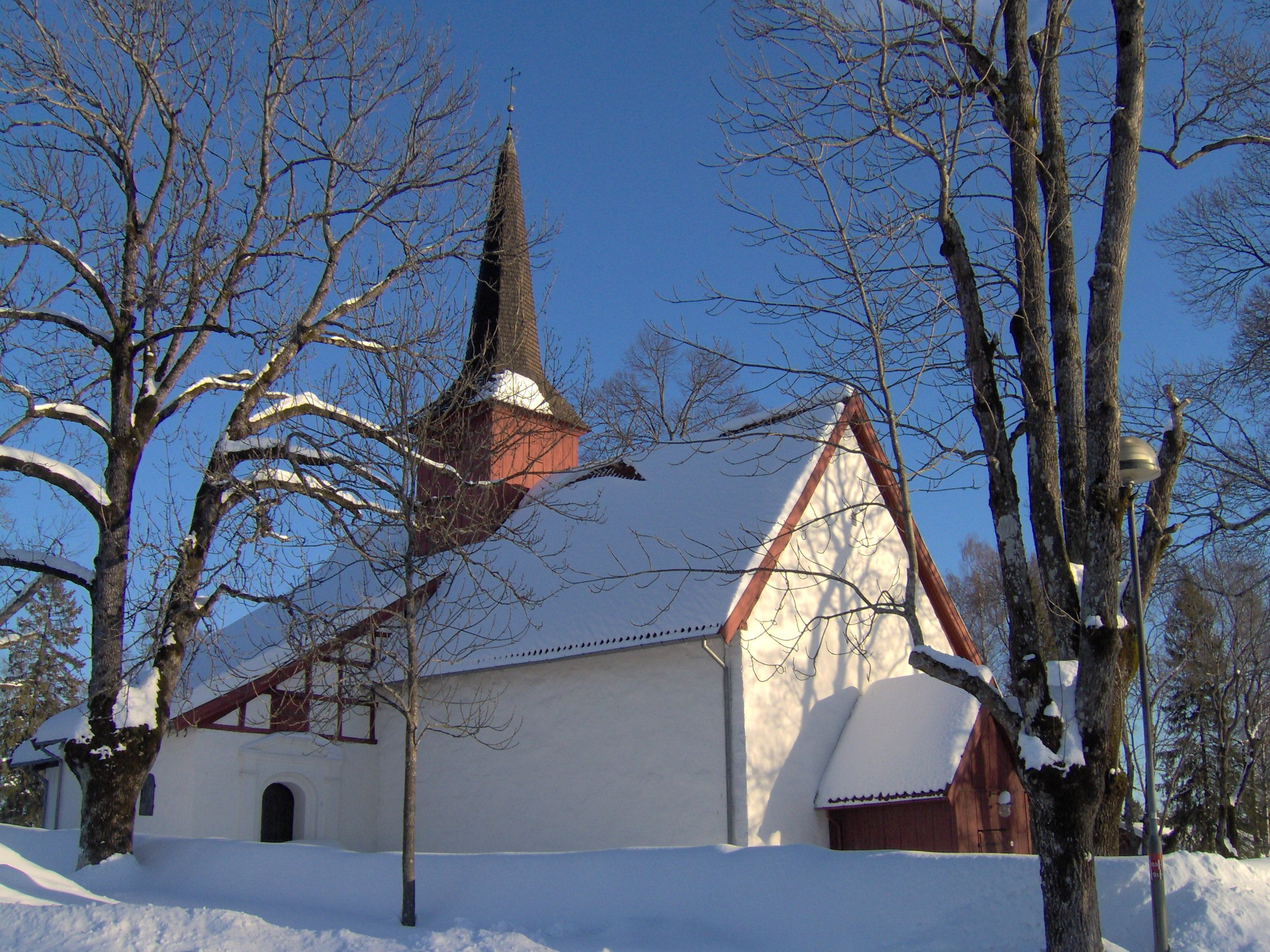

- Location of the church Tanum Church (Norway)
- 59°53′44.84″N 10°28′44.57″E
- Location: Tanum, Bærum
- Country: Norway
- Denomination: Church of Norway
- Churchmanship: Evangelical Lutheran
- Website: tanum-menighet.no

History
- Former name: St. Mary's Church
- Status: Parish church
- Dedication: Saint Mary the Virgin

Architecture
- Functional status: Active
- Architectural type: Romanesque

Specifications
- Capacity: 250 seats
- Materials: Stone

Administration
- Diocese: Diocese of Oslo
- Deanery: Bærum
- Parish: Tanum

Tanum Church (Tanum kirke) is a church located at Bærum in Akershus county, Norway.

== History ==
The church from the early 12th century is one of two medieval churches in Bærum. It was constructed of stone in a rectangular form. It is a Romanesque church that sometimes is referred to as built in Anglo-Saxon style. The church is dated to the first half of the 12th century and was dedicated to Saint Mary the Virgin. In the early 18th century, the church was expanded eight meters to the west. On the north side of the choir, a sacristy with burial chamber below was built in 1674. However, this soon became too small, and in 1713 a larger burial chapel was built, next to the sacristy. In the early 20th century, the church was restored.

The church and surrounding burial site is considered as an important cultural heritage by the Norwegian Directorate for Cultural Heritage and protected by law.

Tanum church has retained its rich inventory and has been a popular motive for many visual artists, among them Harriet Backer.

== Current interior ==
A crucifix and a woman figure, probably showing Virgin Mary and two portals to the south from the Middle Ages are preserved.

The Renaissance altarpiece is from 1663, where the main picture shows Jesus on the cross flanked by Saint Mary and Saint John the Apostle (which is also a motive in some of the murals). The baptismal font was performed by Svend Svanneberg in 1724. The pulpit, which is round, is probably also performed by Svend Svanneberg. There are also exposed murals on the walls. In the church there is a small church organ with 8 voices.

== Harriet Backer and Tanum Church ==
Harriet Backer painted motifs of the interior of Tanum Church several times. Of the most famous are "Christening in Tanum Church" and in "Entrance Wives" (of two women who receive the Eucharist by a priest), both performed in 1892. These paintings clearly showcase her coloristic skills and how she depicts the light and colors of the interior in the interior.

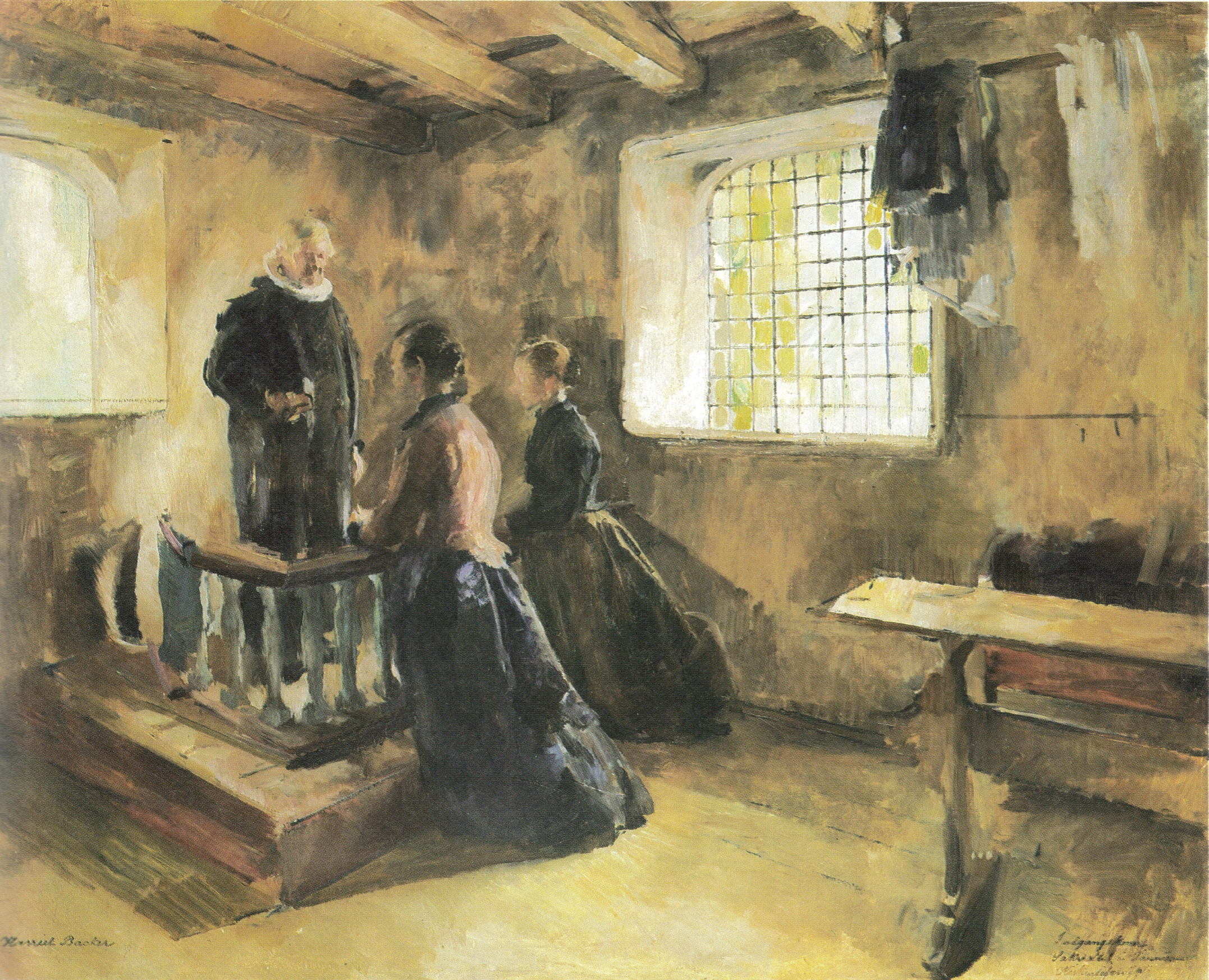
"Entrance Wives" (Harriet Backer, 1892)

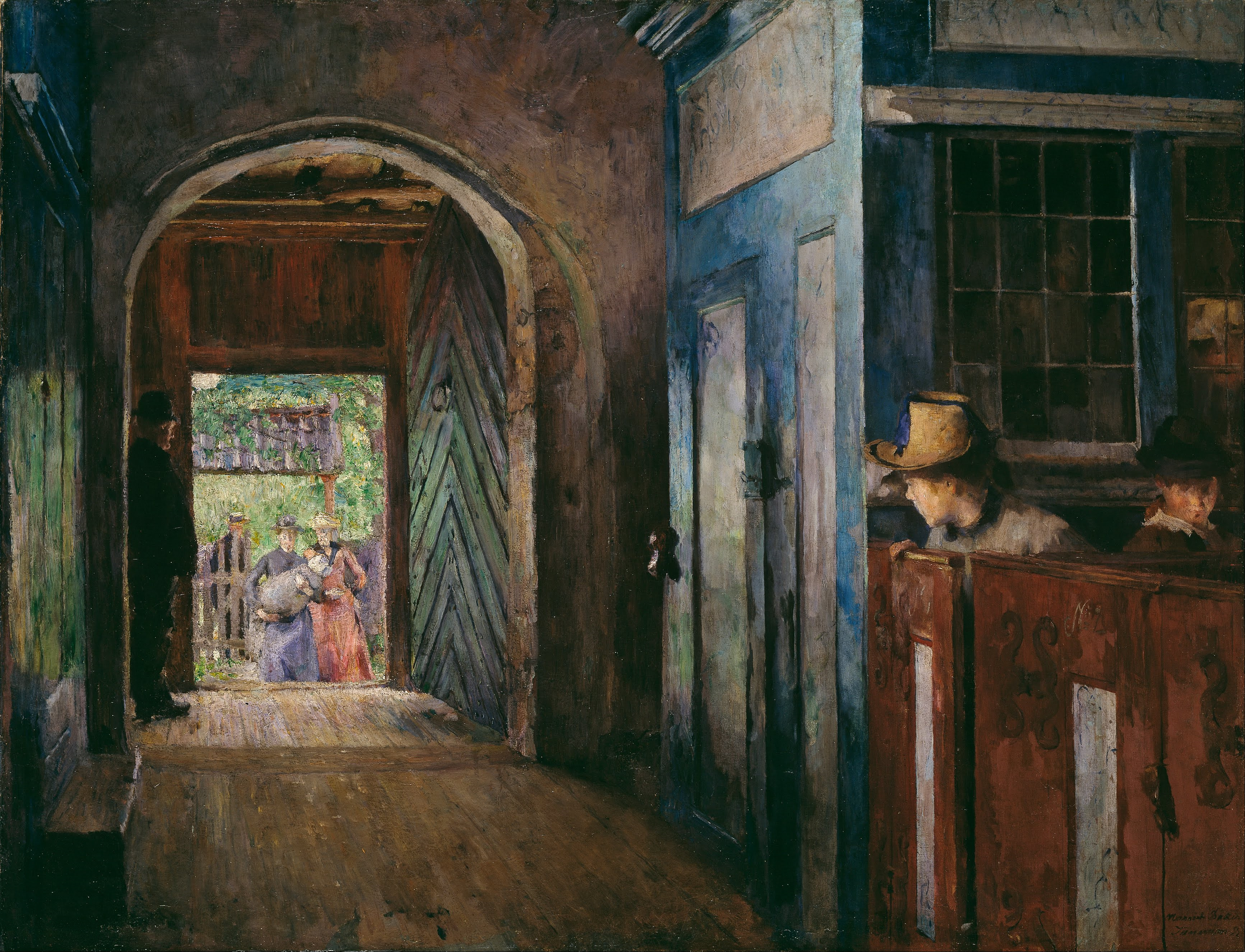
"Christening in Tanum Church", (Harriet Backer, 1892)

== Burial site ==
Tanum Church is surrounded by a cemetery that has been burial site since pre-Christian times. There are several large, ancient burial mounds. Today's cemetery contains about 3000 graves. The oldest preserved grave monuments are from late 17th century.
