= Tanum, Norway =

- Village
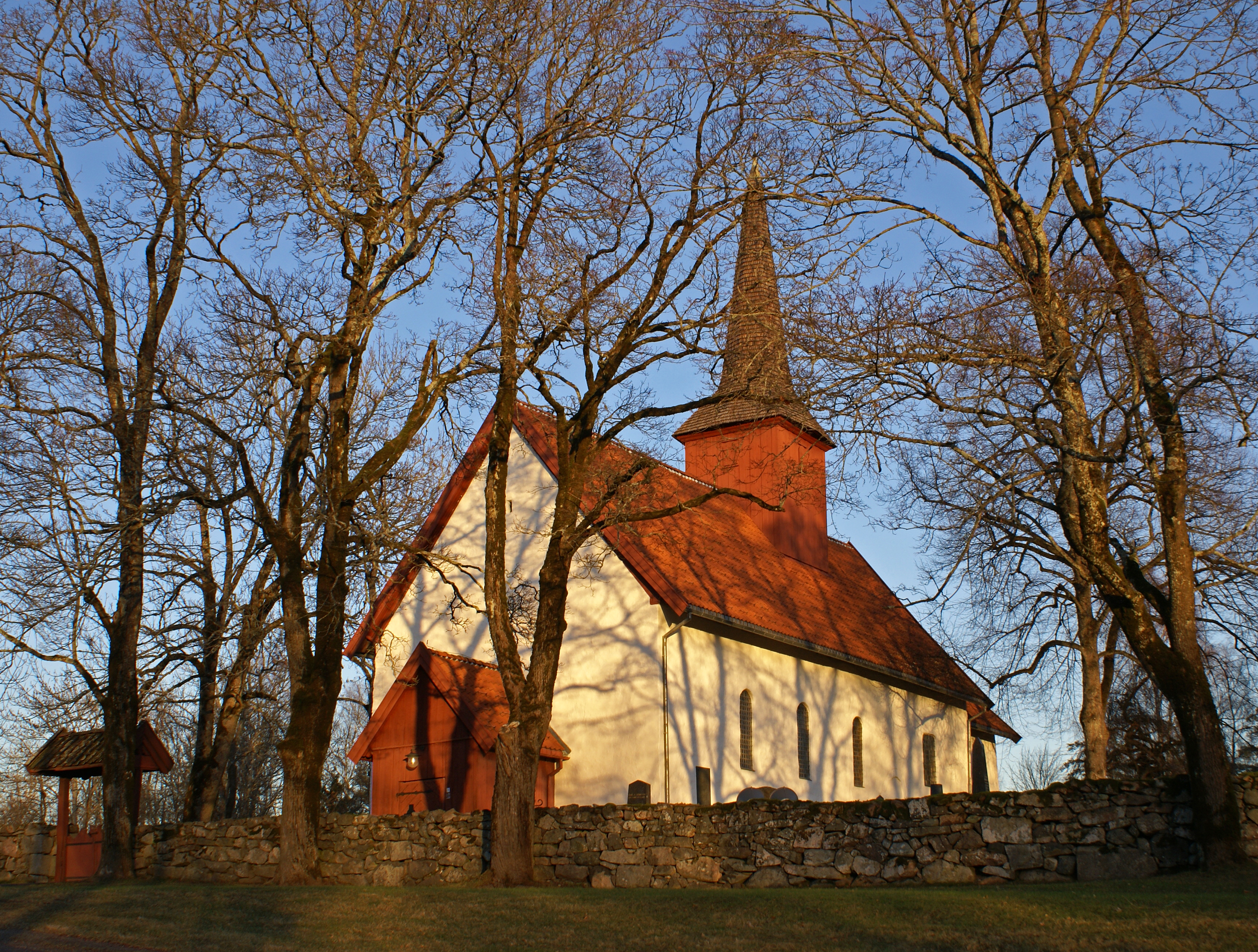
- Tanum Church

- Location in Akershus
- Coordinates: 59°53′1″N 10°30′13″E
- Country: Norway
- Region: Østlandet
- County: Akershus
- District: Greater Oslo Region
- Municipality: Bærum
- Time zone: UTC+01:00 (CET)
  - Summer (DST): UTC+02:00 (CEST)

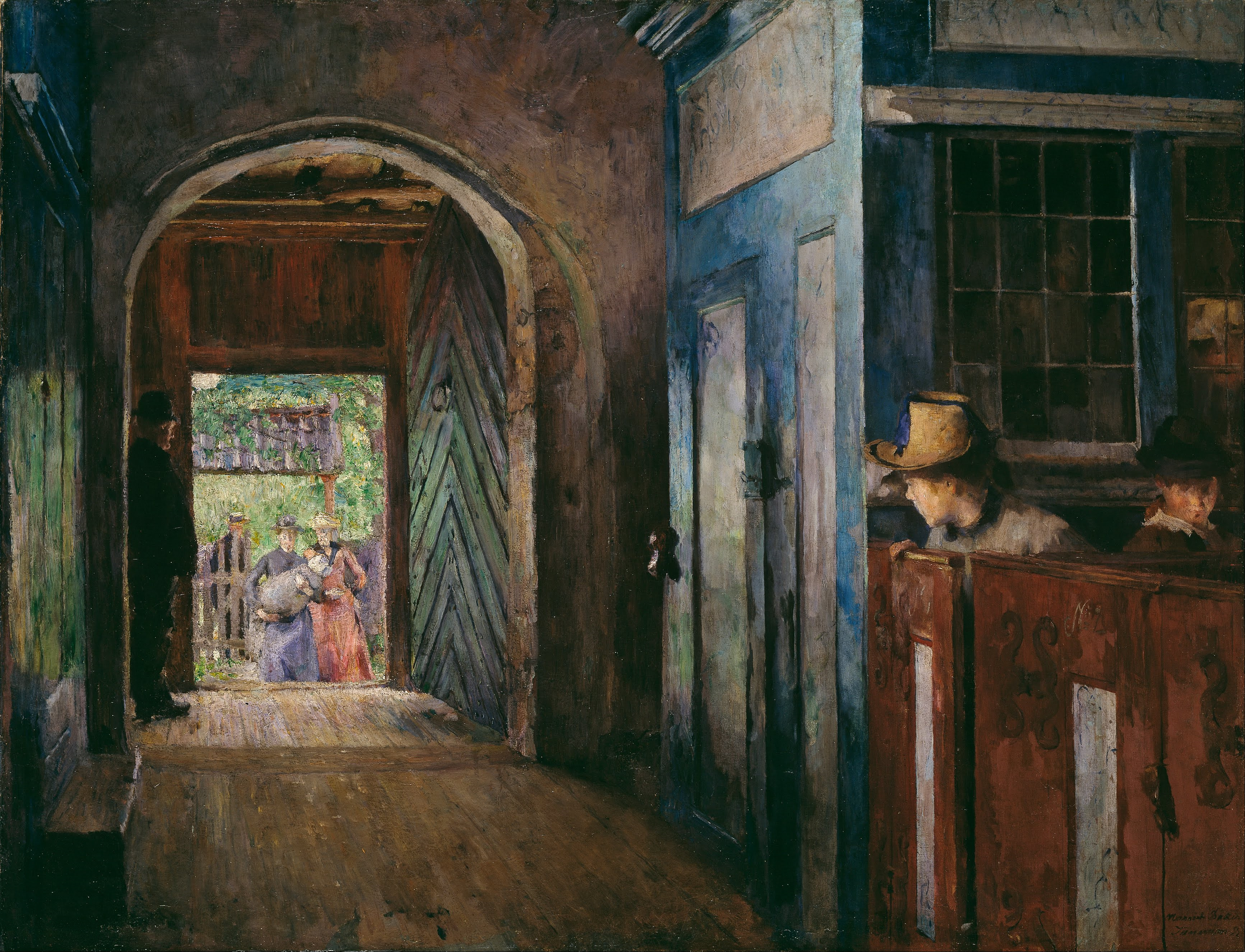
Barnedåp i Tanum kirke (1892) Harriet Backer

Tanum is a parish and district in the municipality of Bærum in Akershus, Norway. Its population (2007) is 2,751.

== Location ==
Tanum in Bærum is situated on the fertile Tanum plateau which is located approximately 150 meters above sea level. The Tanum area has a rich soil, and is the site of a number of farms. This areas is also known for its archaeological findings of several large burial mounds dating from the Iron Age to the Viking Age.

== The name ==
The parish is named after the old farm Tanum (Norse Túnheimr), since the first church was built there. The first element is tún 'country courtyard', the last element is heimr 'homestead, farm'.

== Tanum Church ==
Tanum Church (Tanum Kirke) was built between 1100 and 1130 in Romanesque architecture style. The building material was stone. The church was expanded in 1722. During the early 1900s, the church underwent restoration and was renovated in 1973. The church is of long plan and has 250 number of seats. The Renaissance style altar piece was designed by Frederich Zebal in 1663. The pulpit and baptismal font were made by Svend Eriksen Svanneberg in 1723. The church is noted for its plaster art. It features murals from the 1300s. Medieval sculptures include a Madonna sculpture from approx. 1200 and a Romanesque crucifix from the second half of the 1100s.

=== Gallery ===
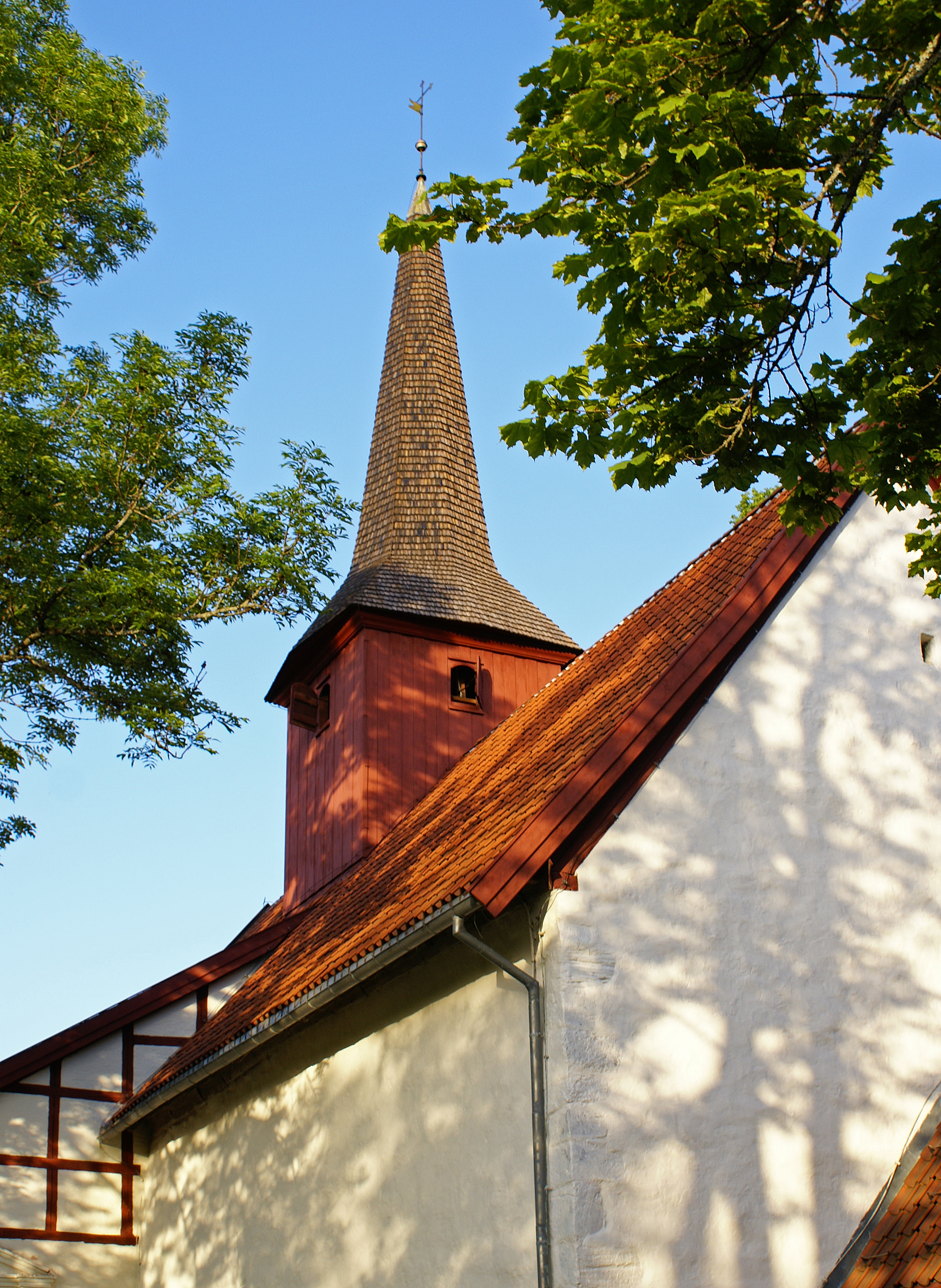

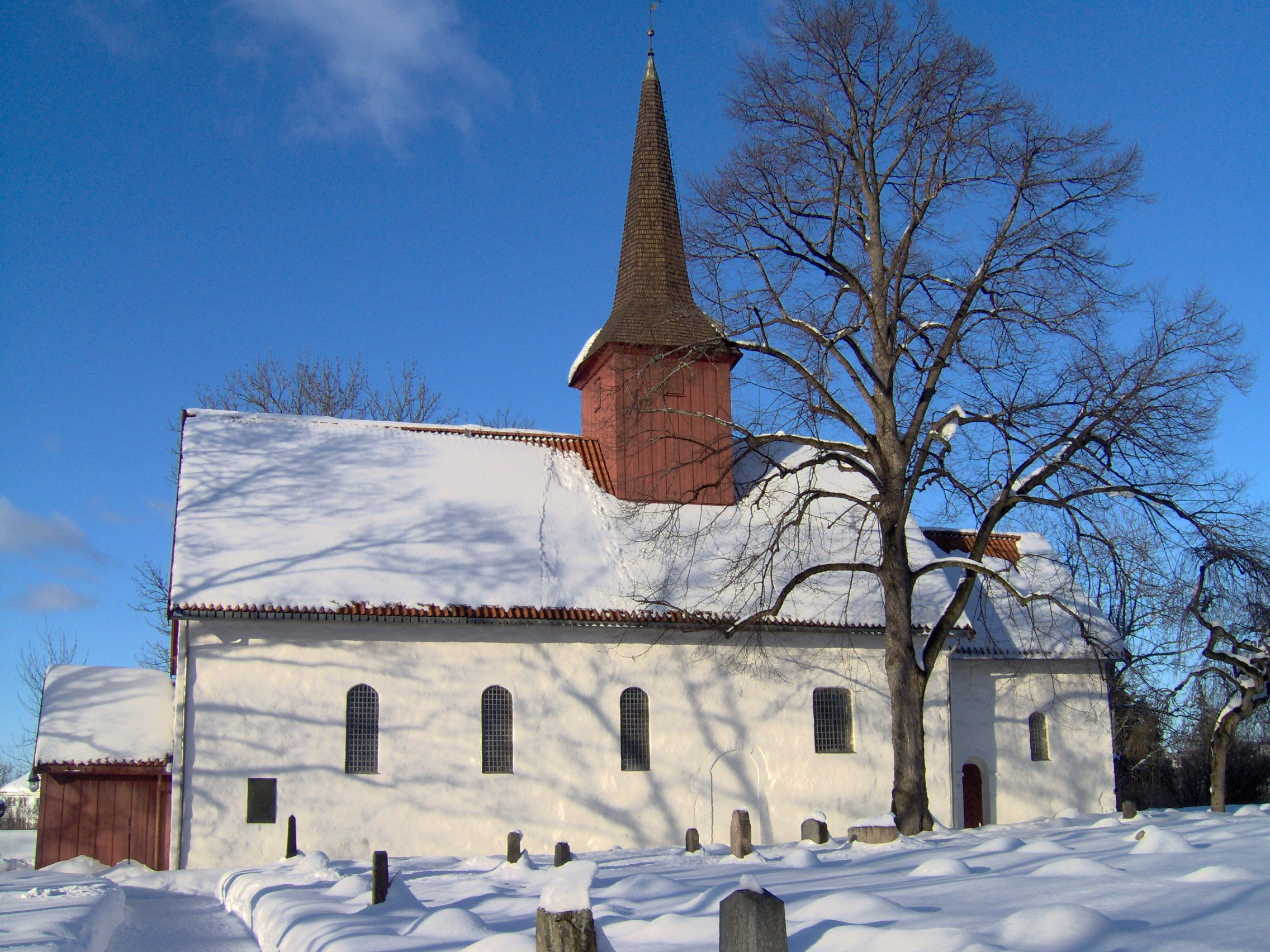

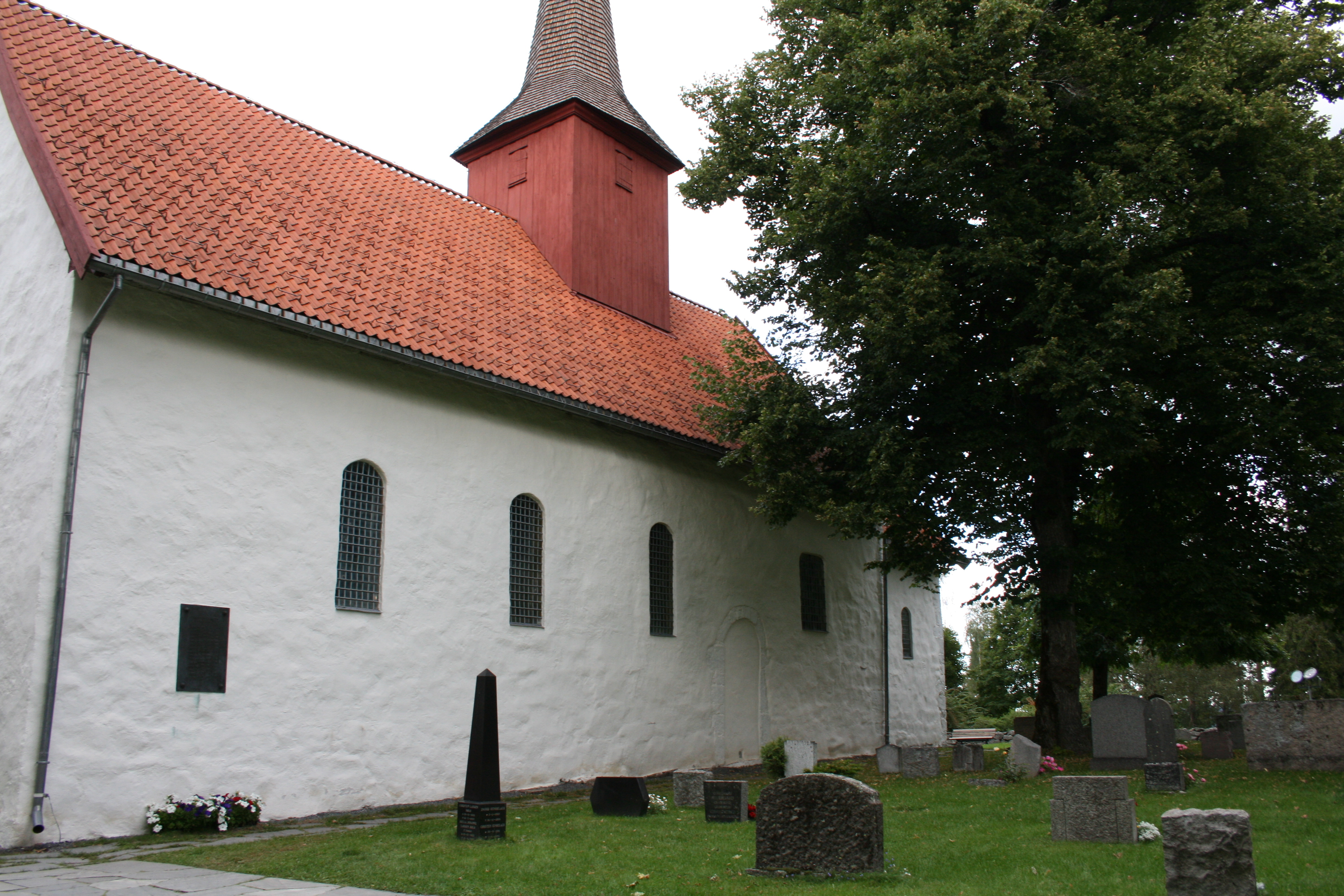

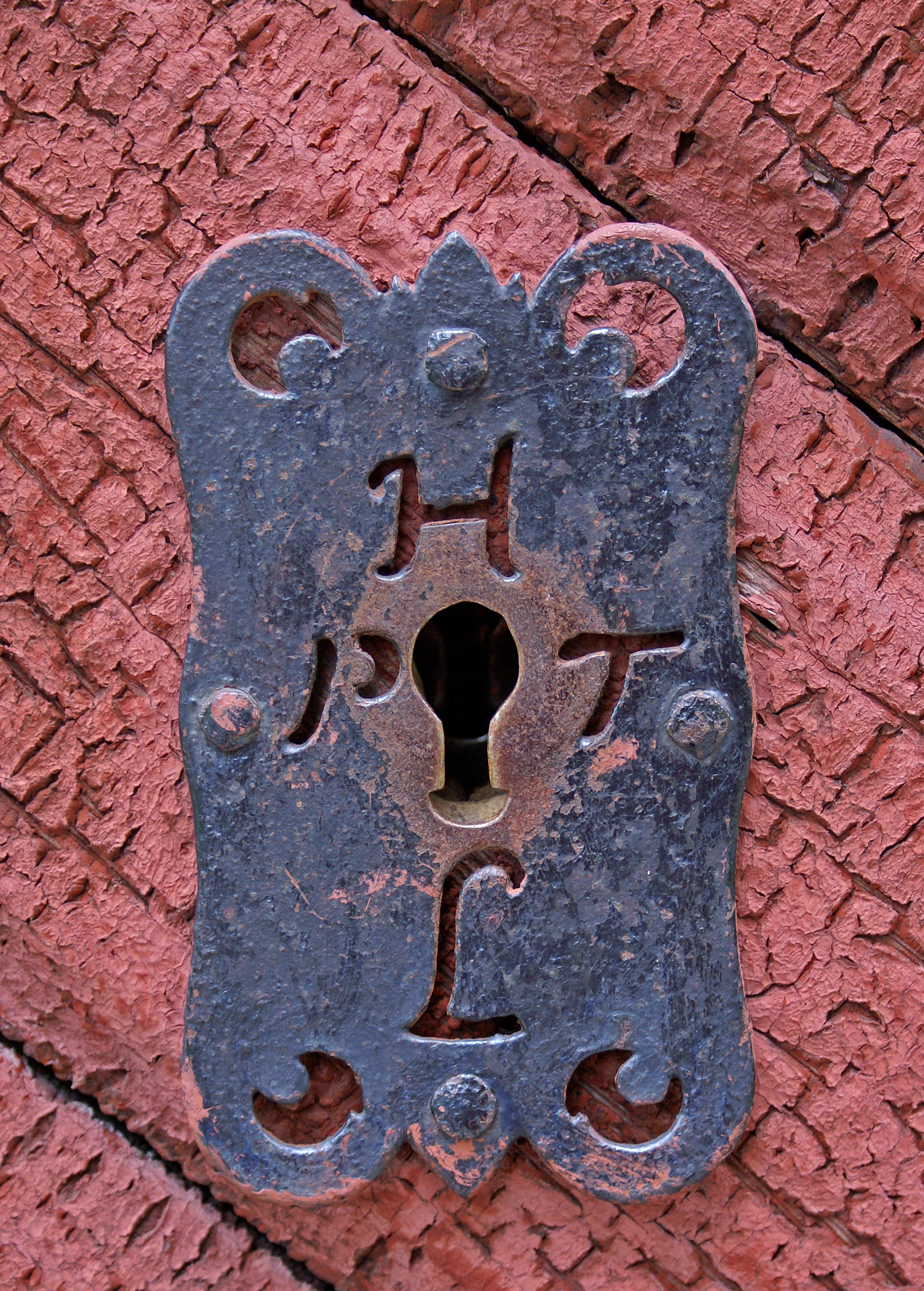

== Notable residents ==
- Philosopher Dagfinn Føllesdal lives in Tanum.

== See also ==
- Tanum Municipality in Sweden.
- Christening in Tanum Church
