= Anton Klaveness =

Norwegian ship-owner

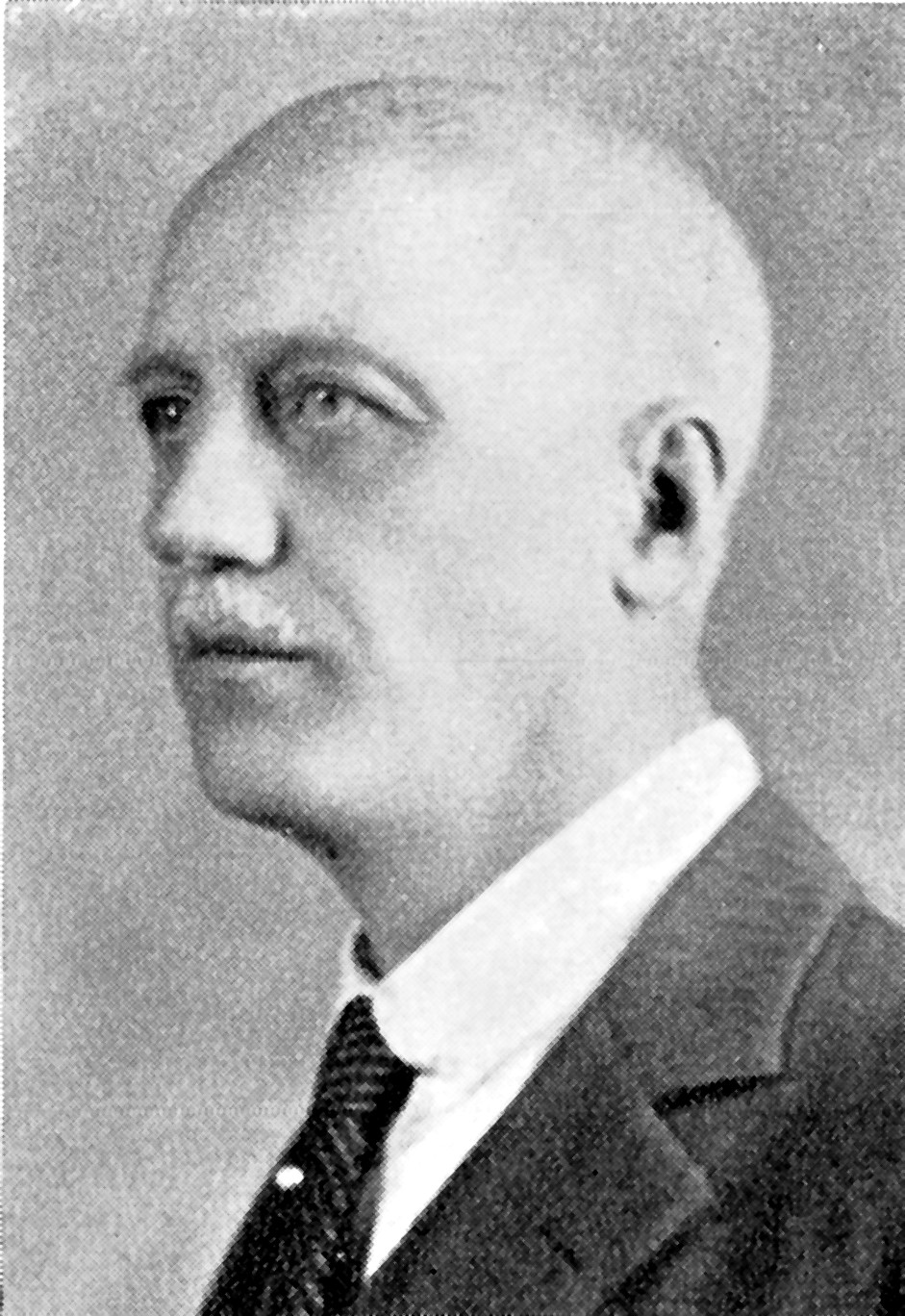
Anton Fredrik Klaveness

Anton Fredrik Klaveness (29 April 1874 – 5 November 1958) was a Norwegian ship-owner.

== Personal life ==
He was born in Sandeherred Municipality as a son of ship-owner Anton Fredrik Klaveness (1839–1904) and Birthe Marie Andersen (1845–1932). He was a nephew of ship-owner Henrik Klaveness and priest Thorvald Klaveness, and first cousin of Thoralv, Thorvald and Wilhelm Klaveness. His sister Berit married Johan Karsten Rasmussen.

In 1899 he married Therese Grøn (1875–1948). Their sons Anton Fredrik and Dag Klaveness continued the family shipping business. Their daughter Eva married Johan H. Andresen.

== Career ==
He operated the shipping company A. F. Klaveness & Co.

The cape Kapp Klaveness at Spitsbergen is named after him. He was decorated Commander of the Order of St. Olav (1952), Commander of the Order of Vasa and Knight of the Order of the Polar Star. He died in November 1958 in Bærum.
