= Framnæs Mekaniske Værksted =

Norwegian shipbuilding company

Framnæs shipyard (Framnæs mekaniske Værksted) was a former Norwegian shipbuilding and engineering firm headquartered in Sandefjord, in Vestfold county, Norway. Originally strongly linked to the whaling industry, in later years it entered into more versatile shipbuilding, including rigs and modules for the offshore business. It was incorporated in 1898 and was closed down in 1986.

== History ==
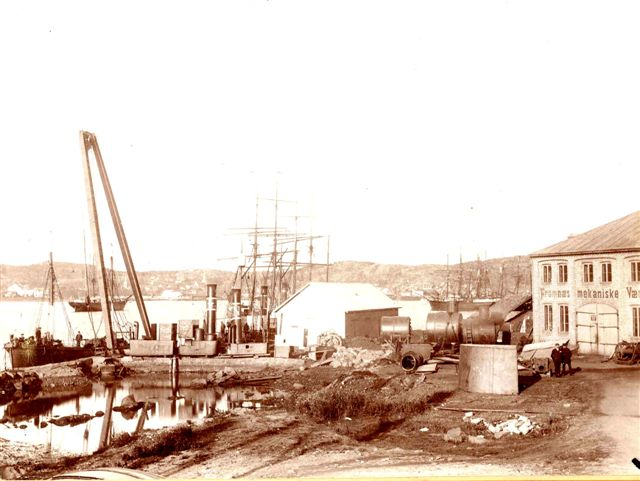
Framnæs mekaniske Værksted

A/S Framnæs mek Værksted has its origins from three earlier shipyards.

Christen Christensen took over Rødsverven in 1868 and bought the other yards one by one. He started Sandefjord Flytedokker A/S in 1884. In 1892, he privately owned almost all of the properties that later became A/S Framnæs mek.Værksted. In the meantime, he also bought Kamfjordverven and Stubbverven. In order to finance the conversion of the yards to steel shipbuilding, Christensen reorganized the corporate structure of the yard in 1898, to a shareholders' company. Sandefjord Flytedokker was dissolved and the two docks sold. New docks were then built by the yard.

=== 1816-1861 ===
==== Klavenessverven 1816-1861 ====
In 1816, sheriff, farmer, yard owner and ship owner Thor Aagessøn Klavenes (1767–1854) established a site for keelhauling, and later a shipbuilding berth at Framnes. The keelhauling site was situated in the area where the carpentry shop was later built, with the building berth located to the northeast. In 1832, his son Aake Torssøn Klavenes took over the management of the yard until his death in 1853. Thor was the main creditor and reassumed control of the company, until Henrik Klaveness (the eldest son of Aake Klaveness) took over in 1857. He sold it to Joseph Lyhmann four years later.

=== 1861-1892 ===
==== Lyhmanns mek Verksted 1861-1882 ====
The owner, businessman and ship owner Joseph Lyhmann (18 September 1825 – 15 April 1915) built in 1861 Lyhmanns mek Verksted approximately where the A/S Framnæs mek Værksted engine shop were located, northwest of today's Skagerrak middle and high schools.

Here, he started a machinery manufacturing business producing mainly agricultural machines such as threshing machines, chaff-cutters, plough equipment, and milling equipment, including Norway's first threshing machine. He also manufactured bicycles, which were claimed to be the first built in Norway. In addition, the business also made steamboats of steel. The company also produced steam engines, steam engines and equipment for sawmills, and boiling equipment for whaling.

==== Sandefjord mek Verksted 1882-1892 ====
In the autumn of 1882, Lyhmann sold the industry to the engineers Hetlesæter and Solberg. The enterprise was renamed Sandefjord mek. Verksted. After having done various mechanical activities, they also built many steamships made of steel, but they faced bankruptcy in 1886.

Lyhmann, the industry's main creditor, took back the facility and sold it in 1889 to Captain A.M. Aamundsen, the engineer Jacob Moe, and Adolf Top. They built and repaired steam ships, turbines, boilers, mills, and sawmill machines, and repaired sealing and other docked ships.

The business did not fare well, and in 1892 it was sold to Christen Christensen.

After Lyhmann sold the facility in 1882, he lived at "Birkerød" for some time. Here he had a small shop where he made grinding and polishing machines for knives. He kept poultry and bees, and made and sold honey separators. He also sold and bought ships. Lyhmann became a businessman in Oslo, where he manned the counter. Lyhmann married twice. He met his second wife through an advertisement in a newspaper. She was 14 years younger than his eldest daughter from his first marriage. They had four children; the youngest, his son Gaute, was born in 1907. Mr. Lyhmann was then 82 years old.

=== 1826-1986 ===
==== Søebergverven 1826-1865 ====
Månedsløytnant, timber merchant and shipowner Peder Soeberg (died 1863) came to Sandefjord in 1807 to join the coast guard. In the autumn of 1808, he conquered a Swedish and a British ship outside Vallø. He purchased one of these from the government and settled down in Sandefjord as a ship owner and businessman. In 1826, he started building ships at Søebergverven which was located northeast of the former boiler shop at A/S Framnæs mek Værksted, with the building berth pointing northwest where the biggest floating dock used to be. The shipyard's tug M/S David was the last ship launched from this building berth in 1930. In the same year that Peder Søeberg leased this site, he also bought Stubbverven.

From the mid-1830s he entered into a cooperation with the sailmaker, businessman, yard owner, and ship owner Søren Lorentz Christensen (9 April 1810 – 5 May 1862), who from 1842 and onwards built a number of ships here. In 1850, Søren Lorentz Christensen bought half of the Søebergverven from Søeberg. Søren Lorentz Christensen became relatively early a tired man, and died at the age of 52.

==== Rødsverven 1865-1878 ====
Christensen's widow Otilie, (née Kruge), was in charge of the management of the business for some years, and continued to do so until her son, yard owner, ship owner, and whaling manager Christen Christensen (9 September 1845 – 16 November 1923), took over as manager in 1868. Later A/S Framnæs mek Værksted started numbering their new buildings from that date. New building no.1 was Sleipner, built by Christen Christensen for his mother Otilie.

==== Framnæs Skipverft 1878-1892 ====
Christen Christensen was a very enterprising man and bought all the surrounding shipyards and properties. When Christen Christensen moved from his private home in the town of Sandefjord (later, butcher Lauritz Pedersen's home) to Framnæsodden in 1879, he had become the sole owner of Rødsverven and the Langestrand area. He laid out an apple garden in the same area as the Framnæs mek Verksted later on had their shipbuilding berth. The house was later dismantled and moved to South Georgia as the administrator residence.

==== Framnæs mek Værksted 1892-1898 ====
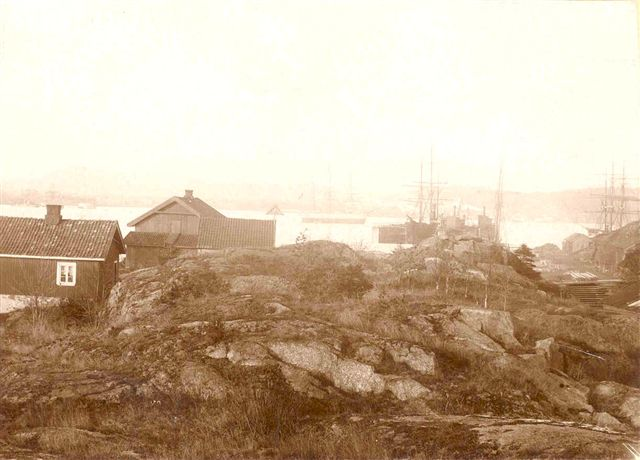
Framnæs mek Værksted, 1892

In 1892, he also bought Lyhmanns mek Verksted or Sandefjord mek Verksted as the name was at that time, and renamed it Framnæs mek Værksted. He owned, at that time, practically all properties and facilities which Framnæs mek Værksted later owned. In the meantime he had, in 1894, established Sandefjord Flytedokker A/S (Sandefjord Dry Docks A/S). They possessed two wooden floating docks, and had close ties with the yard in general.

==== A/S Framnæs mek Værksted 1898-1986 ====
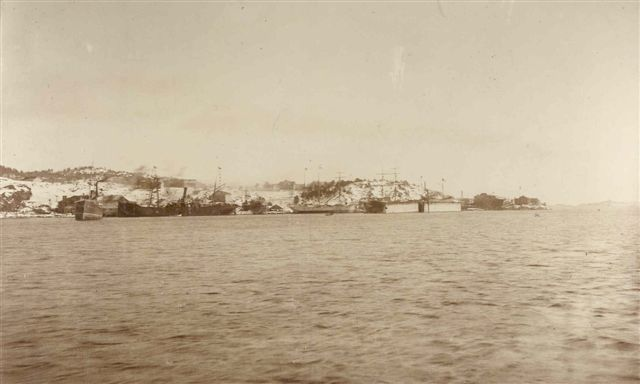
A/S Framnæs mek Værksted, 1899

As it gradually became necessary to change from building ships of wood to ships of steel, and therefore to engage in costly investments, the shipyard in 1898 became a joint-stock company, namely A/S Framnæs mek. Værksted. Christen Christensen remained its dominating shareholder, as his descendants have been since then. From 1899 to his death in 1923 he was chairman of the company. Director of the shipyard for 47 years was the engineer Ole Wegger (1859 - 1936). Christensen was also the founder, main shareholder and chairman of the world's largest seal-hunting company, A/S Oceana, established in Sandefjord in 1887 and registered in Sandefjord in 1891. Christen Christensen's biggest contribution was in the whaling business, as he started whaling in the Antarctic.

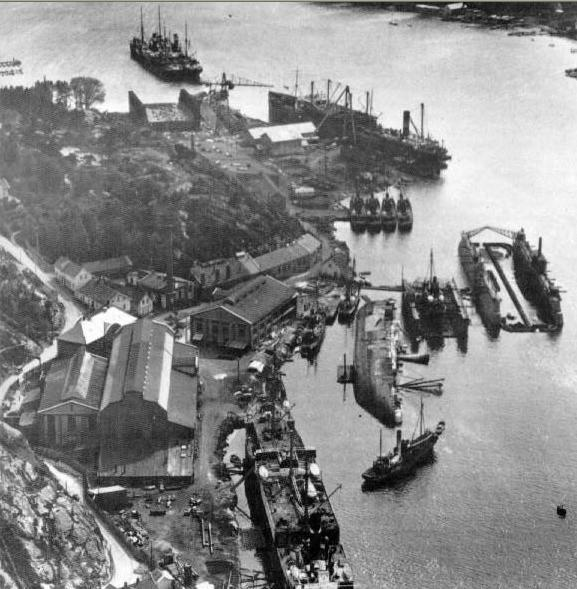
Framnæs shipyard, 1930

=== Properties ===
A/S Framnæs mek Værksteds's landed property is mainly separated from a farm by the name of Vestre Rød. The eldest known name on the farm is Rud in Valley, and the first known owner was Svale Jonsson Smør. From 1620 to 1630 the Vestre Rod belonged to the feudal overlord, Admiral Ove Gjedde, and was later included as a speck in his son-in-law, Niels Langes's big estate. When Niels Langes's bankruptcy was settled, Vestre Rod, in 1667, was first transferred to Mayor Marcus Barenholt's property and then to Vilhelm Mechelsberg.

In 1972, Vestre Rod was redeemed by Ulrik Fredrik Gyldenlove, and then it became county estate. The county estate was sold in 1805 to King Frederick VI of Denmark, who again sold it in 1817 to a shareholder company in Larvik, namely the gentlemen: county governor Michael Falk, dean J.F. Sartz, businessman Matthias Sartz and the cashier at Fritsø Jernverk, Gether (also called the badgers).

In September 1835, they surrendered the properties to department counsel Villum Fredrik Treschow, who, on 11 September bought the claims of the county from King Frederick, who wanted to keep the wood and sell the farmland. In that way, sheriff Thor Aagessøn Klavenes on 4 January 1838 bought farm no.1 from Vestre Rod (the farm Vestre Rød was at that time split in two). Included was also a property he leased in 1816 for Klavenessverven, but not the part that Peder Søeberg leased in 1826 for Søebergverven.

Henrik Klaveness, the grandson of Thor Klaveness, took over this property by means of an auction convey of 21 February 1857 and sold it later, on 30 March 1861, to Joseph Lyhmann.

In 1826, Peder Søeberg bought the Stubbverven from Jacob and Søren Hauene, and he took on the lease to the Soebergverven the same year.

This site Joseph Lymann bought from Michael Treschow on a convey of 9 December 1864.

By a convey of 6 June 1865 Joseph Lyhmann sold the site to Henrik Klaveness.

By a convey of 21 March 1874 Joseph Lyhmann and Henrik Klaveness sold the whole site of Søebergverven to the businessman Jon Elisæus Sanne Wetlesen (father of art painter Wilhelm Wetlesen and brother-in-law of Christen Christensen).

In the summer of 1872, Christen Christensen, shopkeeper P.C.Pedersen, shopkeeper G.Wierød and Christen Lorentz Sørensen d.y. from Nordby built a steam sawmill at Svines by the lake Gogsjo.

This came into the ownership of sheriff Bjørndal and Ole and Anders Skorges in the summer of 1916. This was named Gogsjø Dampsag.

According to the convey, registered on 27 November 1874, J.E.S. Wetlesen did sell his part in the Rødsverven (Søebergverven) to Gogsjø Dampsag, who on 23 April 1878 transferred this site to Christen Christensen.

On 31 October 1876 Christen Christensen bought from Joseph Lymann that part of Vestre Rød that reached from Rødsverven and out to Langestrandsbekken.

By a convey dated 8 January 1892 Christen Christensen bought Sandefjord mek Verksted, formerly Lyhmanns mek Verksted, and later the same year also Stubbverven.

Vestre Rød was already in the year of 1757 split into two farms. From 1821 to 1855 the farm no.2 was run by Hans Perssøn Holtan. In 1857 farm no.2 was sold to Martin Larsen Bettum {grandfather of Frithjof Bettum (ref.A.Jahres rederi)}. Christen Christensen bought in May 1878 from Martin Larsen a lot south of Langestrandsbekken and further out to the property of Gjelstad in south.

Christen Christensen became the private owner of all the land A/S Framnæs mek Værksted took over in the year of 1898.

Endurance

== Ships built ==
The most commonly known ships today built in the shipyard include:

- Jason
- Godthaab
- Endurance
- Christian Radich
- Viking

== See also ==
- Framnaes

== Sources ==
- Lardex - Framnæs mek Værksted
