= Henrik Klaveness =

Norwegian politician

Henrik Klaveness (16 April 1826 – 15 April 1888) was a Norwegian ship-owner and politician.

He was born in Sandeherred (later named Sandar) as a son of ship-owner Aake Torssøn Klavenes (1801–1853) and grandson of Thor Aagessøn Klavenes (1767–1854). He was a brother of priest Thorvald Klaveness, and his two other brothers were ship-owners.

He was married to Thora Klaveness and had several children. One of their sons, Lars, became a banker in their hometown. Another son, Thoralv Klaveness, became a well-known writer. Henrik Klaveness was also an uncle of Anton Fredrik, Thorvald and Wilhelm Klaveness. He was a grand-uncle of Anton Fredrik Klaveness, Dag Klavenes, Torvald Faye Klaveness and Kristen Faye Klaveness.

He was a farmer at Gogstad nedre in the parish of Sandar. In 1857, he inherited the shipyard "Klavenessverven", which had been owned by his father and grandfather. He sold the yard to Joseph Lyhmann (1825–1915) in 1861. In 1865, he bought two thirds of "Søebergverven" from Lyhman, after the death of Peder Søberg in 1863. This was sold to John Eliseus Sanne Wetlesen (1843–1917) in 1874. Both of these yards would become a part of Framnæs Mekaniske Værksted.

He was elected to the Parliament of Norway in 1870 and 1873 for the constituency Jarlsberg og Laurvigs Amt (now Vestfold), serving until 1878. He also served as mayor of Sandar from 1864 to 1878.
