= A. F. Klaveness & Co =

Norwegian shipping company

A. F. Klaveness & Co. was a Norwegian shipping company. Founded in 1799, the shipping ventures ended in 1996, but the company lives on as a holding company.

== History ==
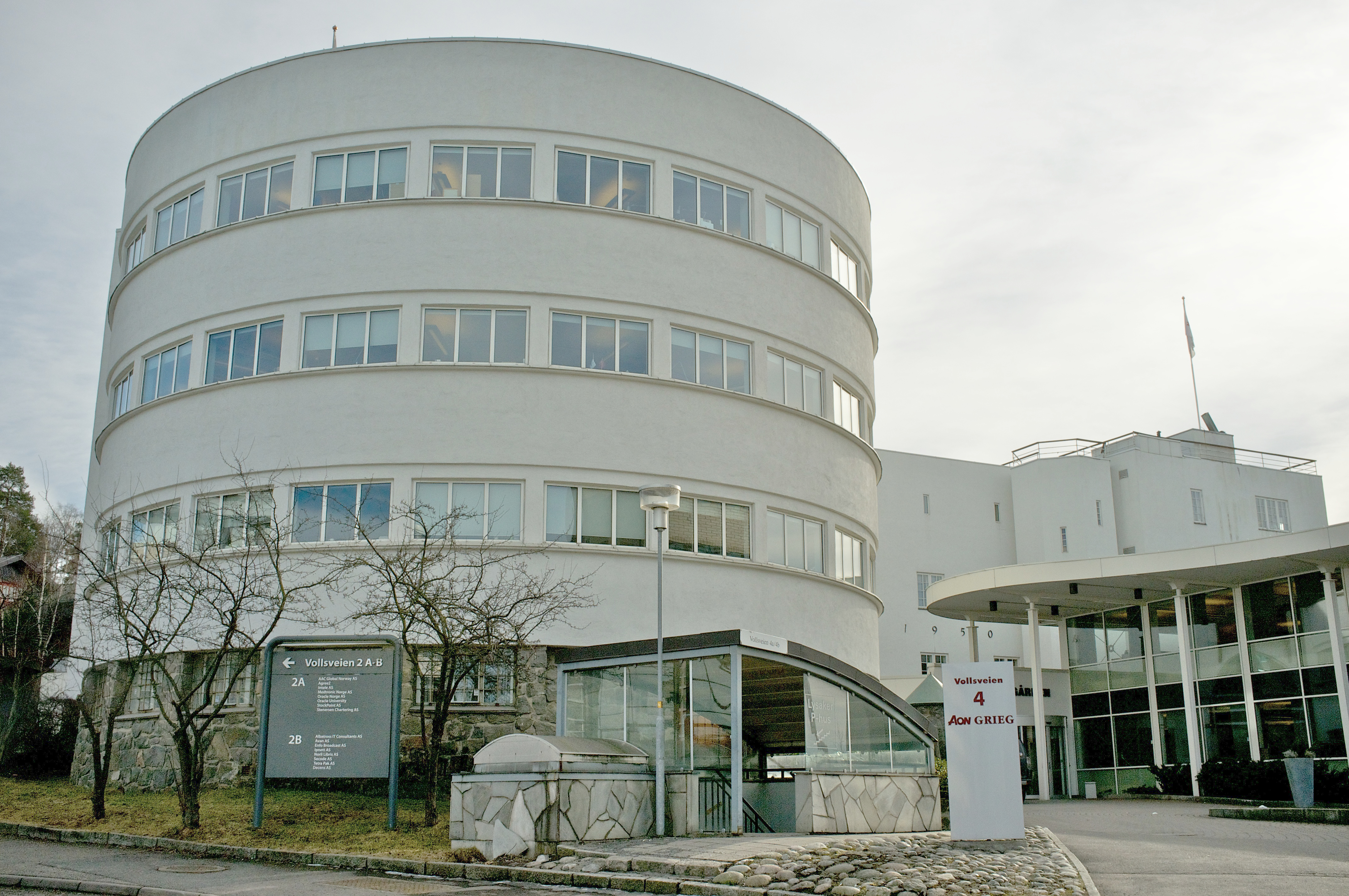
The Klaveness Building at Lysaker.

The company was founded by Thor Klaveness (1767–1854) in 1799 in Sandefjord. The name was changed to A. F. Klaveness in 1869, when Anton Fredrik Klaveness (1839–1904) took over. When his son Anton Fredrik Klaveness (1874–1958) became partner in 1898, the name became A. F. Klaveness & Co.

The head office was moved to Lysaker in 1907. In 1933 a modern head office building designed by Magnus Poulsson was built in Vollsveien 4.

A. F. Klaveness & Co was one of Norway's largest shipping companies after 1914. They established Fern Line together with Fearnley & Eger in 1925, which sailed from the Mexican Gulf to East Asia. In 1929 they followed with the Klaveness Line between the US Pacific and East Asia. Later, the company also took part in the foundation of the Royal Viking Line.

After a bankruptcy in 1983 the company no longer operated any ships. In the same year, the company resigned its membership in the Norwegian Shipowners' Association. A new attempt was soon made to re-enter the shipping business, when the company bought four vessels in 1989 and one in 1991. They were sold off again between 1992 and 1996. The head office at Lysaker was sold in 1995. Klaveness had regained its membership in the Norwegian Shipowners' Association in 1990, but finally resigned in 2002.

The name A. F. Klaveness & Co lived on as an investment company based in Haakon VIIs gate 1 in Vika, Oslo. In 2007 it changed its name to Ekeberg Finans. However, at the same time another investment company Klaveness Holding (founded in 2001 under a different name) took over the A. F. Klaveness & Co and became the mother company of Ekeberg Finans.
