= Henrik Carstensen =

Norwegian businessman, timber merchant and shipowner

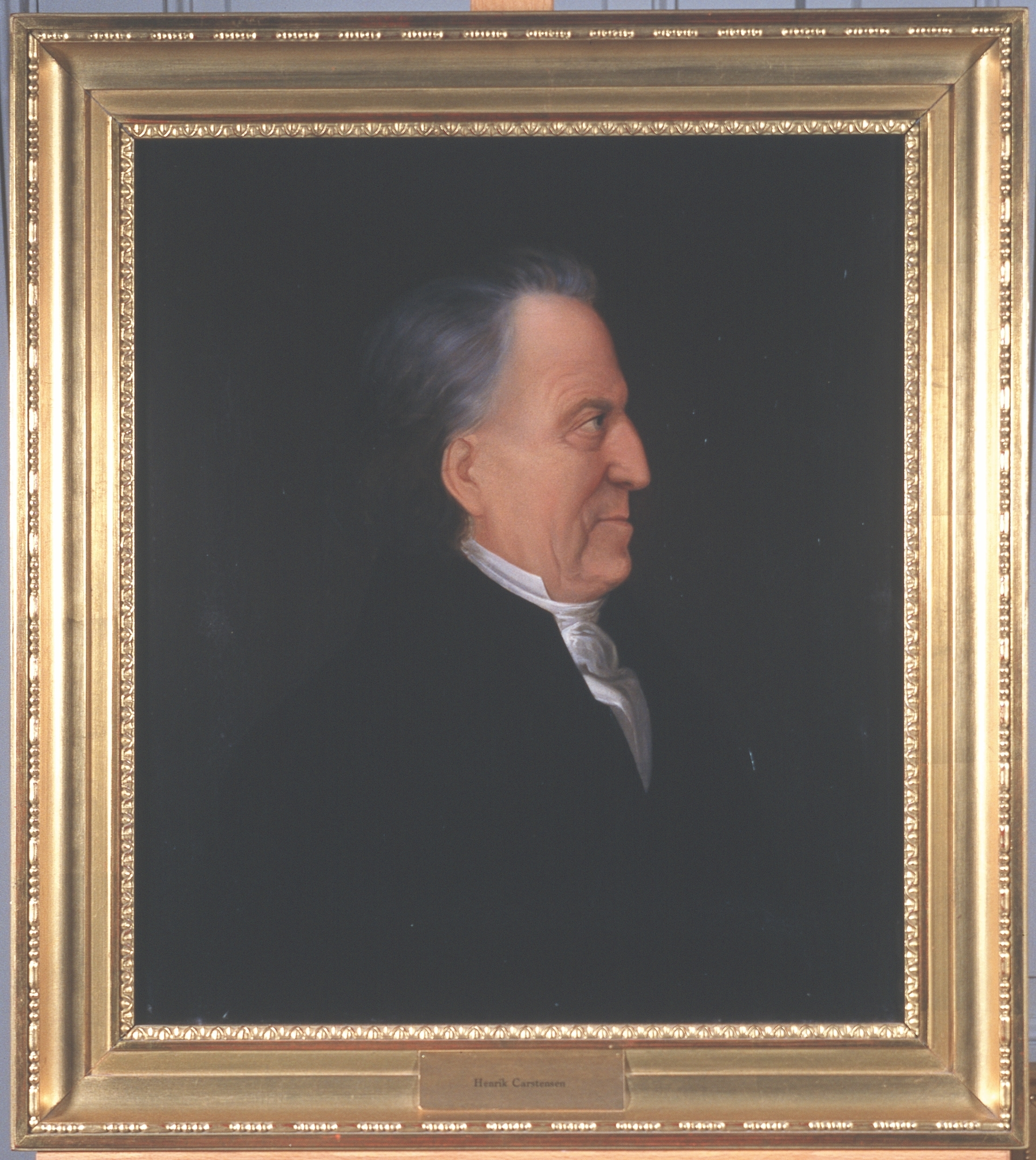
- Born: 30 October 1753; Risøya near Risør, Norway
- Died: 15 September 1835 (aged 81)
- Occupations: Businessman, timber trader, ship owner

Henrik Carstensen (30 October 1753 – 15 September 1835) was a Norwegian businessman, timber merchant and shipowner. He served as a representative at the Norwegian Constituent Assembly in 1814.

Henrik Carstensen was born on the island of Risøya near the town of Risør in Nedenes county, Norway. Henrik Carstensen went to sea in his younger years and was a captain by 1775. From 1780, he was skipper on his own ship. In 1788, he started trading in Risor in Søndeled, where he ran both a lumber and shipping business. In 1799, he purchased Egeland Ironworks (Egelands jernverk) at Eikeland in Gjerstad. Over time, he bought forested acreage estates, operated sawmills and a distillery. In 1833 he retired from the business, which he conferred upon his nephew, Carsten Henrik Carstensen (1796–1852), whom he had adopted in 1821.

He represented Øster Risøer at the Norwegian Constituent Assembly in 1814 where he followed the union party (Unionspartiet), but later supported the independence party (Selvstendighetspartiet).

== Related Reading ==
- Holme, Jørn (2014). De kom fra alle kanter - Eidsvollsmennene og deres hus (in Norwegian). Oslo: Cappelen Damm. ISBN 9788202445645.
