= Norwegian Shipowners' Association =

Norwegian employers' organization

The Norwegian Shipowners Association (Norwegian: Norges Rederiforbund) is an employers' organization and interest group for Norwegian shipping and offshore companies. The organization's primary fields are national and international industry policies, employer issues, competence and recruitment, environmental issues and innovation in addition to safety at sea.

The operations of the Norwegian Shipowners Association is executed in close relation to the industry. The organization is led by boards and councils appointed by its members, and an important part of the operations is carried out by groups and committees. The member organizations are divided into five different groups: Deep Sea, Short Sea, Group of Underwater entrepreneurs (GUE), Group of Offshore entrepreneurs (GOE) and Group of Offshore Service companies (GOS).

The environmental vision of the Norwegian Shipowners Association is that Norwegian shipping and offshore entrepreneur operations will not have any environmentally damaging emissions at sea or in the air. One of the associations objectives is that climate emissions from shipping will be regulated through international regulations, preferably administrated by IMO.

As an employer organization the Norwegian Shipowners Association is responsible for collective bargaining and the establishment of collective agreements for Norwegian and foreign seamen on a ship in the Norwegian International Ship Register (NIS) and the Norwegian Ship Register (NOR), and for offshore activities. The association protects the members' employer relationship also through the contact and the influence of Norwegian and foreign authorities, and participate in international organizations like the EU, ILO and IMO.

Besides working with the Norwegian maritime schools, it also operate several international activities to ensure access and quality of foreign crew and officers serving on Norwegian-controlled ships. All potential recruitment countries are considered, and the main countries today is the Philippines, China and Russia. Here, the Norwegian Shipowners Association have activities in different degrees.

Norwegian Shipowners' Association has approximately 160 members. The organization is located in Rådhusgaten 25 in Oslo. Harald Solberg is the managing director and Synnøve Seglem is the president.

The organization was founded on 15 September 1909 in Kristiania, under the nameThe Norwegian Shipowner Association, and changed to its current name in 1984. Association's first president was Christian Michelsen. The organization played an important role in the negotiation of shipping contracts with the United Kingdom in World War and World War II and several of the association's members were driving force in the organization of the Nortraship.

== Presidents ==
- 1909–1912: Christian Michelsen
- 1913–1915: Aanon Gunerius Knudsen
- 1915–1918: Ambortius Olsen Lindvig
- 1921–1924: Gustav Henriksen
- 1925–1927: H. Westfal-Larsen
- 1928–1930: H.M. Wrangell
- 1931–1933: Arth. H. Mathiesen
- 1934–1936: Fr. Odfjell
- 1937–1940: Christian Wegner Haaland
- 1940–1942: Arne Bjørn-Hansen
- ...
- 1945–1947: Klaus Wiese-Hansen
- 1948–1950: Ths. S. Falck jr.
- 1951–1953: Ole Bergesen
- 1954–1956: L. Usterud-Svendsen
- 1957–1959: H. Kuhnle
- 1960–1961: Jørgen Jahre
- 1962–1963: Nils Astrup
- 1964–1965: Marius Lundegaard
- 1966–1967: Knut H. Staubo
- 1968–1969: Johan Horn
- 1970–1971: Thomas Chr. Haaland
- 1972–1973: Dag Klaveness
- 1974–1975: Halfdan Ditlev-Simonsen jr.
- 1976–1977: Charles R. Bergesen
- 1978–1979: Nils Werring jr.
- 1980–1981: Fridtjof Lorentzen
- 1982–1983: Atle Jebsen
- 1984–1985: Wollert Hvide
- 1986–1987: Peter T. Smedvig
- 1988–1989: Nils Jørgen Astrup
- 1990–1992: Jens Ulltveit-Moe
- 1992–1994: Rolf Westfal-Larsen
- 1994–1996: Westye Høegh
- 1996–1998: Per Sævik
- 1998–2000: Bjørn Sjaastad
- 2000–2002: Leif Terje Løddesøl
- 2002–2004: Terje J. K. Andersen
- 2004–2006: Johan G. Hvide
- 2006–2008: Trygve Seglem
- 2008–2010: Elisabeth Grieg
- 2010–2012: Thor Jørgen Guttormsen
- 2012–2014: Trond Kleivdal
- 2014-2016: Lars Peder Solstad
- 2016-2018: Hans Olav Lindal
- 2018 - 2020:Lasse Kristoffersen
- 2020-2022: Paul Christian Rieber
- 2022 - : Synnøve Seglem
