= SS Bastø (1934) =

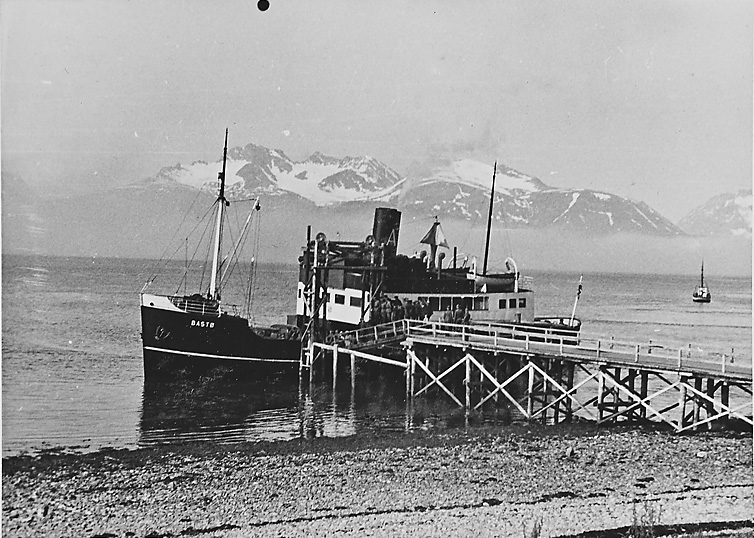

History
- Name: SS Bastø (1934–47); SS Alpha (1947–52); SS Røtinn (1952–54); MF Røtinn (1954–70); Costa Gaia (1970–72); Vulcano (1972–2012)
- Owner: Alpha (1934–1952); Kristian Ravns Ferjerederi (1952–61); Nord-Ferjer (1961–70); Tragetti delle Isole (1970–2012)
- Operator: Alpha (1934–1952); Kristian Ravns Ferjerederi (1952–61); Nord-Ferjer (1961–70); Tragetti delle Isole (1970–2012)
- Port of registry: Moss (1934–52); Narvik (1952–70); Trapani (1970–2012)
- Route: Moss–Horten (1934–52); Røsvik–Bonnåsjøen (1952–70)
- Builder: Moss Værft & Dokk
- Cost: NOK 370.000
- Yard number: 60
- Completed: June 1934
- Identification: IMO number: 5300986; Call sign: LIVZ
- Fate: Broken in 2012

General characteristics
- Type: Coastal steamship
- Tonnage: 322 GRT / 125 NRT
- Length: 44.5 m (146 ft)
- Beam: 8.3 m (27 ft)
- Installed power: 559 kW (750 hp) (1934–1954); 485 kW (660 hp) (1954–2012)
- Propulsion: four-cyinder compound steam engine; two-stroke, four-cylinder diesel engine
- Speed: 12 kn (22 km/h; 14 mph)
- Capacity: 18 cars; 400 passengers

SS Bastø was a roll-on/roll-off (roro) ferry built by Moss Værft & Dokk in 1934. Originally built as a steamship with side-loading for vehicles, she was converted to diesel propulsion and received aft and bow car loading ramps in the early 1950.

Ordered by Alpha of Moss, Norway, she was originally used on the Moss–Horten Ferry, and later on routes from Moss to Oslo as SS Alpha. The vessel was bought by Kristian Ravns Ferjerederi (later Nord-Ferjer) in 1952, where she was named MF Røtinn and used on the Røsvik–Bonnåsjøen route. She ended her career in Italy with Trapani-based Tragetti delle Isole, who initially named her Costa Gaia. After a sinking in 1971, she was repaired and renamed Vulcano. The ship was scrapped in 2012.

== Specifications ==
As built, Bastø had a length of 44.5 meters (146 ft), a beam of 8.3 meters (27 ft), giving her a register tonnage of 322 gross and 125 net. She had a capacity of 18 cars and 400 passengers.

Bastø was built as a single-direction ferry, which had to be loaded with vehicles from the side. Her capacity was for 18 cars and 400 passengers. She was in 1952 rebuilt with a through car deck, allowing for cars to be loaded through the bow and stern.

She initially had a four-cylinder compound steam engine, built at Fredrikstad Mekaniske Verksted, with a power output of 559 kW (750 hp). This gave her a speed of 12 knots (22 km/h; 14 mph). From 1954, she received a two-stroke, four-cylinder diesel engine from Alpha, with a power output of 485 kW (660 hp).

== History ==
=== Initial service with Alpha ===
Starting in the 1920s, the Moss–Horten route had seen some regularity with car traffic. As the 20s turned into the 30s, the traffic was reaching unsustainable amounts. The ferry, SS Bastø II, was built as a coastal passenger and cargo liner. Although it had space for two cars, these had to be hoisted on board by cranes. A rebuild in 1929 that increased capacity to five cars did not solve the underlying isse: Alpha needed a ferry where the cars could drive themselves on board.

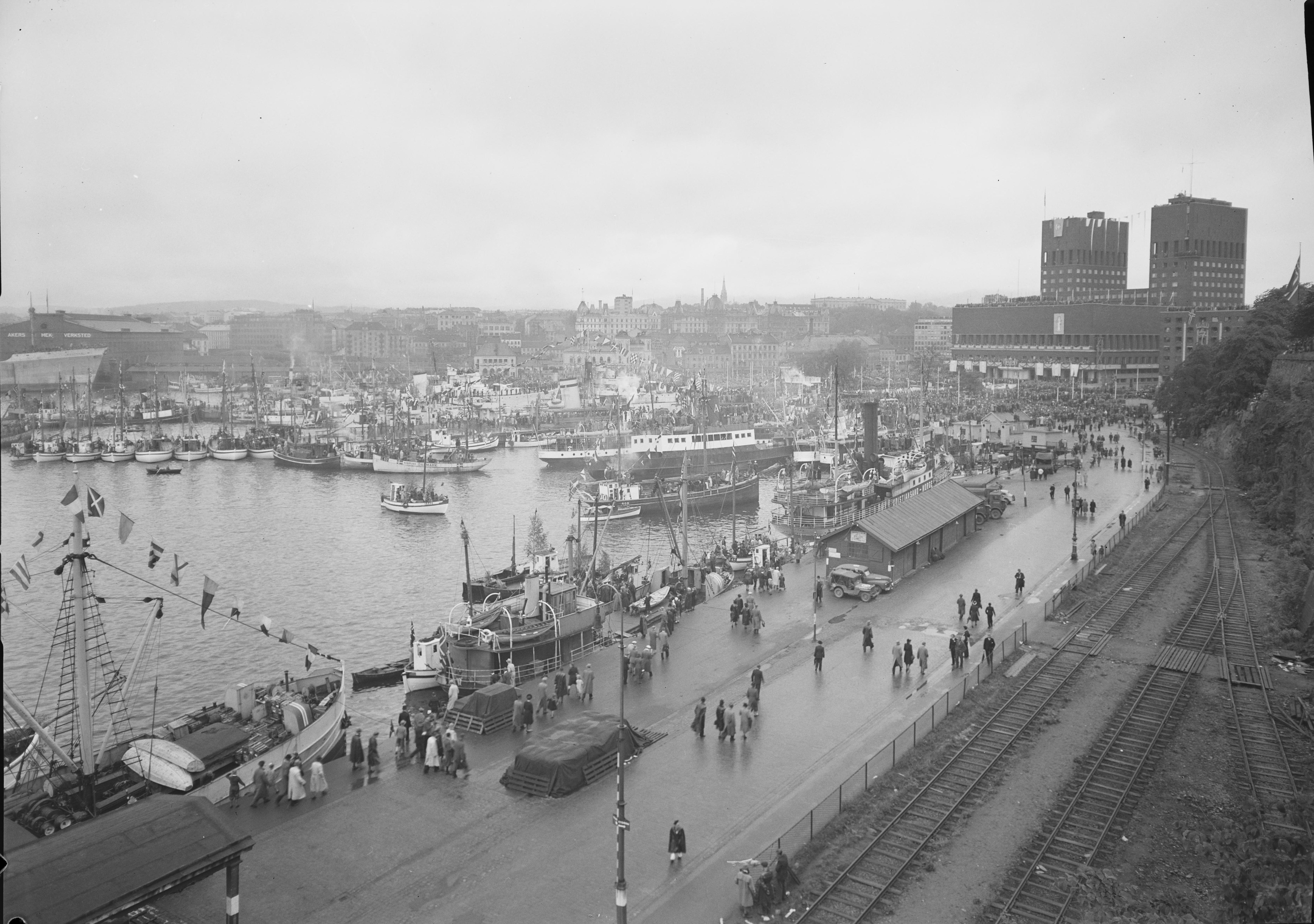
Bastø at port in Oslo on 7 June 1945

Alpha's management originally proposed that a full ro-ro with a full-length car deck be built, with loading and unloading of vehicles at both ends. The Norwegian Public Roads Administration opposed this move, as it was not willing to bear the costs of upgrading the quays in Horten and Moss. As a result, a system whereby cars would drive themselves on and off from the side of the ferry was chosen.

The procurement of such a large ferry was beyond the financial means of Alpha, and so the company issued new shares to raise more capital. Bastø was ordered from Moss Værft & Dokk and cost 370 thousand kroner. She was delivered on 1 June 1934, in time for the busy summer season. She could make seven round trips per day between Moss and Horten, with an additional service in the busy July and August months.

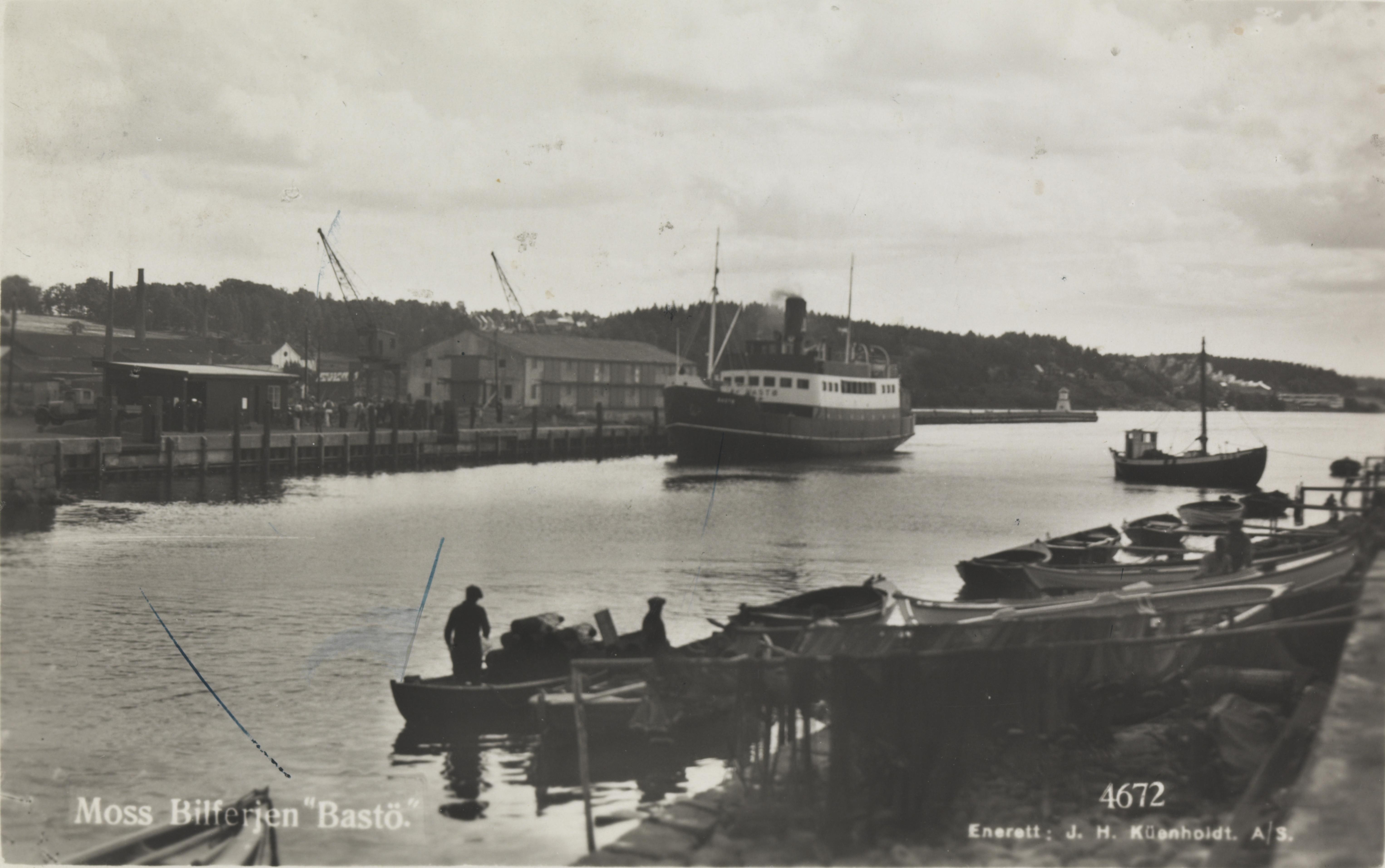
Bastø at Moss during the 1930s

Bastø had a huge impact on the number of cars that could be transported. The increased ease and lower ticket fares saw the number of cars on the route increase from three thousand in 1933 to eighteen thousand in 1939.

Three years after entering service, Alpha already had determined that Bastø was too small. Pressure mounted on the company to increase capacity, especially for more cars. By then the Public Roads Administration was willing to pay for improved quays. Alpha therefore took delivery of MF Bastø II on 13 July 1939. She was immediately put into the route as the main vessel. Bastø was retained as a reserve ferry, which would be used during summer peaks and otherwise when the main ferry was for repairs. For the first summer season, from July to September 1939, she was chartered to Fylkesbaatane i Sogn og Fjordane.

=== Service with the Kriegsmarine ===
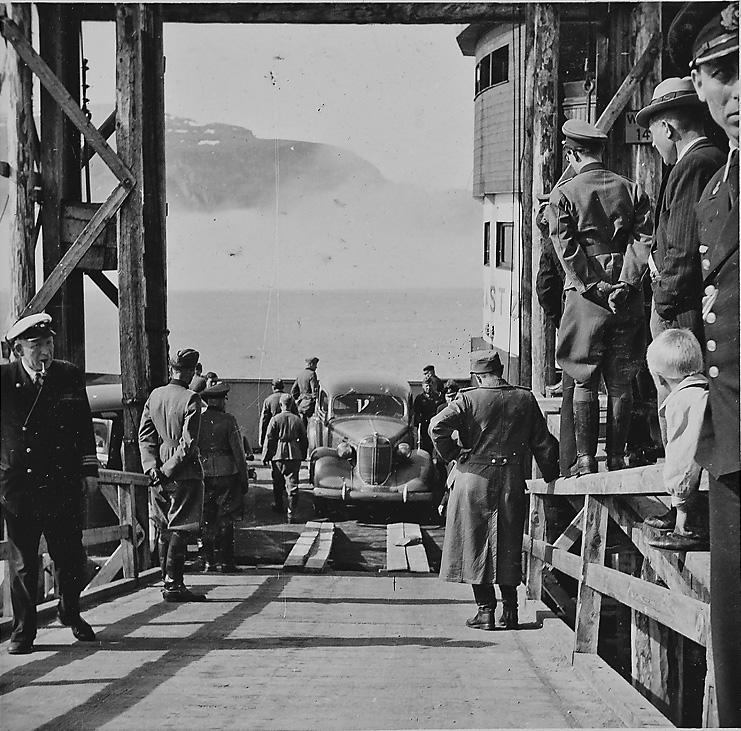
Reichskommissar Josef Terboven about to unload his car after crossing Lyngen. This showed the somewhat cumbersome way vehicles had to be driven on and off the side of Bastø before she was rebuilt in 1952

Bastø was leased to the Royal Norwegian Navy from February 1940 for minelaying services. Alpha regarded the ferry as an essential service, and therefore demanded that she be returned within 24 hours, should Bastø II break down.

The Kriegsmarine requisioned her for a round trip to Kjevik, between 4 and 25 June. She was re-requisioned on 11 October 1940, and was moved to Northern Norway for ferry duty there. Her first role was on the Elsfjord–Hemnesberget in November. She then went further north, doing various supply runs in Northern Norway. During the summer of 1941 and 1942 she was deployed to the Lyngseidet–Olderdalen service.

On 8 January 1944, a fire started on board while she lay docked in Tromsø. Three people were killed in the fire. She was partially repaired and then sent back to Moss for them to be completed. She was finished repaired in January 1945 and was put into the Moss–Horten route due to requisions for the rest of the fleet. From July she became the reserve ferry again.

=== Return to Alpha ===
Traffic continued to increase and Alpha ordered its next ferry, MF Bastø, in January 1947. To free up the name, the old Bastø was renamed SS Alpha. With the new vessel delivered in September 1949, Alpha was moved to the route between Moss and Oslo. This route was on a downward spiral, and cut Alpha from the route in the early 1950, and put her up for sale.

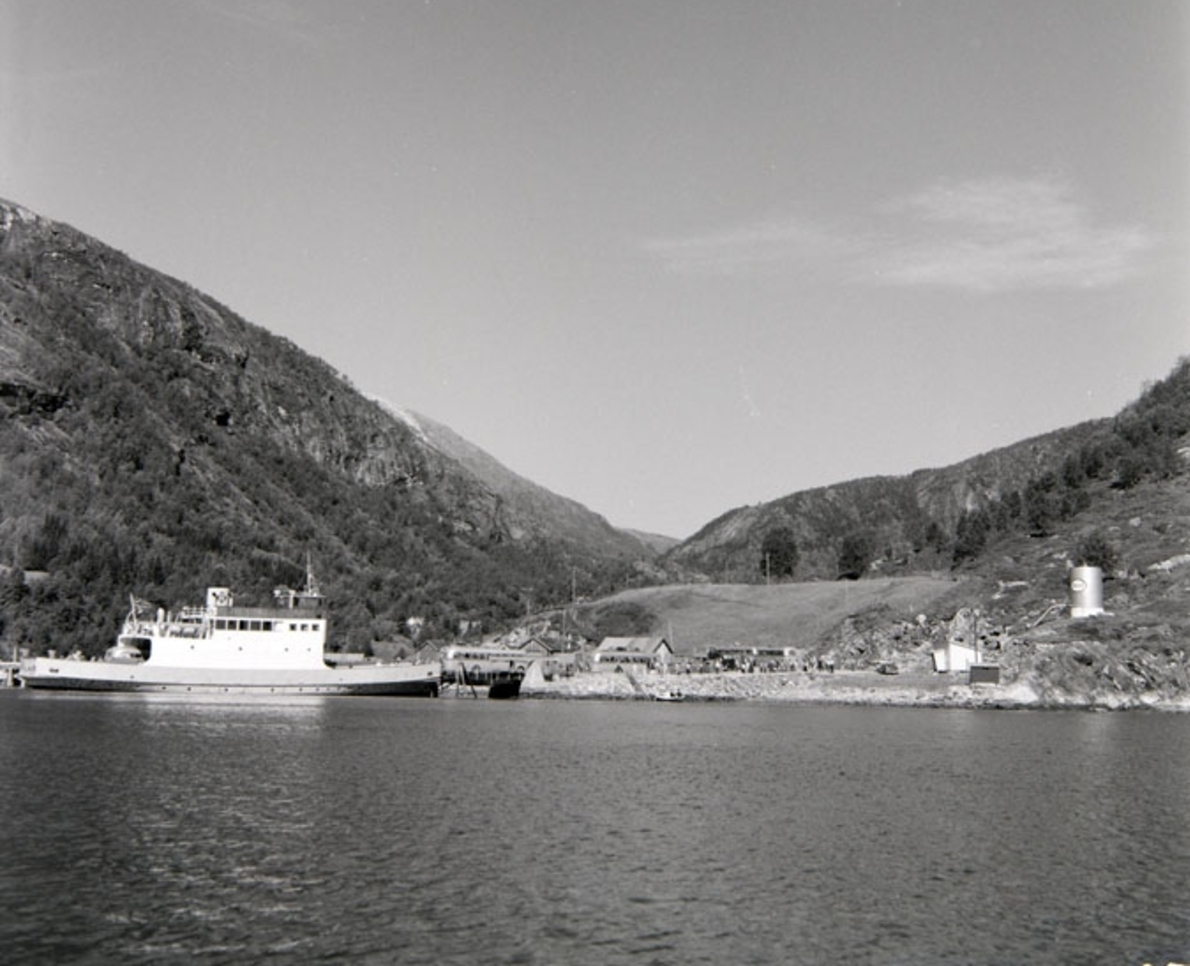
MF Røtinn at Bonnåsjøen in 1960, while operated by Kristian Ravns Ferjerederi

=== Service with Kristian Ravn and Nord-Ferjer ===
In Nordland, Kristian Ravns Ferjerederi was in need of a new ferry for the Røsvik–Bonnåsjøen route. Traffic had increased dramatically on the route after the end of the war, and Ravn was in need of a larger ferry. Alpha was sold to Ravn on 7 May 1952, who renamed her Røtinn and moved her port of registry to Narvik. She was at the time Kristian Ravn's largest ferry. Before putting her into service, she was rebuilt to have a through car deck, and her vehicle clearance increased. She was further modernized in 1954, when her steam engine was replaced by a diesel engine at Bergen Mekaniske Verksted.

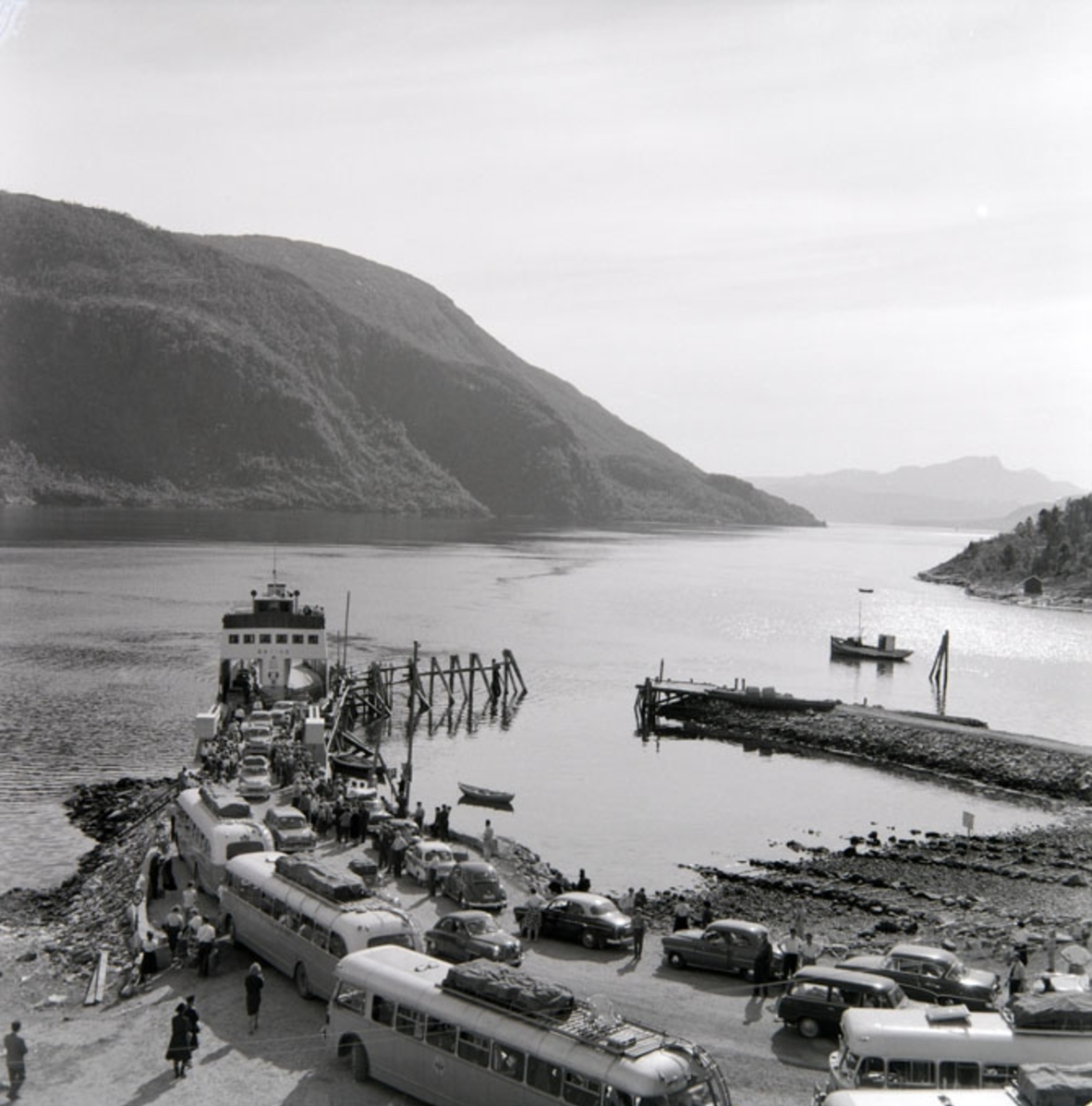
MF Røtinn at Bonnåsjøen in 1960

Kristian Ravs Ferjerederi was reorganized as Nord-Ferjer on 1 December 1961. The larger MF Rombakfjord took over as the main ferry on the Røsvik–Bonnåsjøen route from in 1964. Røtinn was still used as a peak season and reserve ferry on the 80-minute crossing, as three ferries were needed to keep it running. The E6 was extended on 20 June 1966, allowing the ferry service to be shortened to Sommerset–Bonnåsjøen. Røtinn was taken out of service outside of the summer season from 1966. Her deck only tolerated a 3-tonne axle load, too litte for heavy traffic, and could only carry passenger cars and other light vehicles. She was put out for sale in August 1969.

=== Service with Tragetti delle Isole ===
The ship was sold to Italian company Tragetti delle Isole in July 1970. There she was initially renamed Costa Gaia and her port changed to Trapani. On 26 November 1971, she capsized and sank at port in Trapani, during the disembarking of motor vehicles. She was subsequently salvaged. After repairs, she was renamed Vulcano and put back into service in 1973.

She was sold and arrived at Aliağa, Turkey, for scrapping on 17 April 2012.

== Bibliography ==
- Ryggvik, Helge; Søilen, Espen (1992). Bastøfergen: Fra damplekter til brikke i pengespillet (in Norwegian). Sandefjord: Gokstad.
