= MV Suilven =

Ferry built in 1974

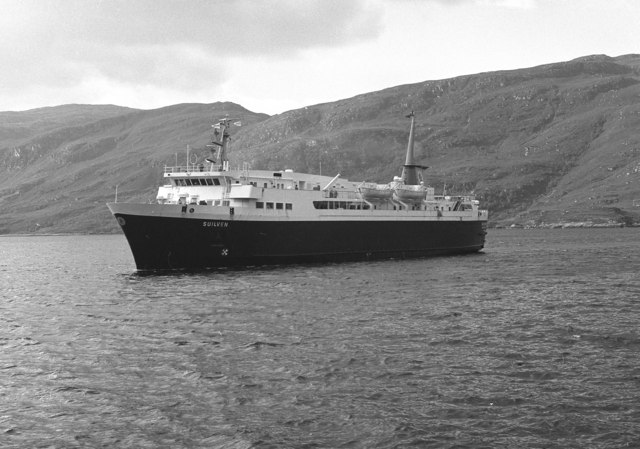
- MV Suilven off Ullapool

History
- Name: MV Suilven
- Namesake: Suilven
- Operator: 1974: Caledonian MacBrayne; 1995: Strait Shipping, New Zealand; 2004: Bligh Water Shipping, Fiji; 2015: Venu Shipping, Fiji
- Port of registry: 1974:: Glasgow, United Kingdom; 1995:: Wellington, New Zealand; 2004:: Suva, Fiji
- Route: Stornoway to Ullapool 1974–1995; Wellington to Picton 1995–2002; Wellington to Nelson 2002–2004; Around Fiji 2004–2015
- Builder: Moss Rosenberg of Norway; Engine Builders:Wichmann, Norway
- Yard number: 180
- Launched: 19 April 1974
- Acquired: 1974
- In service: 27 August 1974
- Out of service: July 1995 (with Caledonian MacBrayne) 2004 (with Strait Shipping) 2015 (with Bligh Water Shipping) November 2015 (with Venu Shipping Limited)
- Identification: IMO number: 7383487; MMSI Number: 512000060 (NZ); 520090000 (Fiji); Callsign: GULA; 3DYS (Fiji)
- Fate: Sunk in Suva harbour, 24 November 2015

General characteristics
- Tonnage: 1980
- Length: 86.52 m (283 ft 10 1/2 in)
- Beam: 16.03 m (52 ft 7 in)
- Draught: 4.96 m (16 ft 3 1/2 in)
- Installed power: 2 × 7-cyl, Wichmann Diesel 1300 kW
- Propulsion: 2 × variable-pitch propellers & 2 × Brunvoll SPK300 bow thrusters
- Speed: 16 kn (30 km/h) (service)
- Capacity: 500 passengers, 120 cars
- Crew: 25

MV Suilven was a vehicle ferry built in 1974 and operated for 21 years by Caledonian MacBrayne on the Ullapool to Stornoway route. She subsequently operated in New Zealand and later in Fiji. She capsized in Suva harbour in 2015 with no loss of life.

== History ==
The vessel was originally ordered by Norwegian shipping company Alpha as the twin of Bastø V. Alpha operated the Moss–Horten crossing of the Oslofjord. Bastø V had been ordered as a much larger vessel than the current fleet, and was intended to be a workhorse on Alpha's own line for the summer peaks, and leased out for the winter. Alpha's board decided in 1972 to order a twin for delivery from Moss Rosenborg Verft in 1974. This ship was not intended to run on the Moss–Horten route, but was instead intended to be sold for a profit. In the mean time the oil crisis hit, and Alpha struggled to find a buyer.

CalMac was struggling with the popularity of the shortened route to the Outer Hebrides, between Stornoway and Ullapool, which was being served by 1964 MV Clansman. A deal was stuck with Alpha. By then, Bastø V was already in service, while Sullivan was still on the stocks. This allowed CalMac to inspect the completed ferry. They found that she would not meet British standards requirements, particularly since the design called for a car deck under the main car deck, which would be below the fire line. But since building had hardly begun, it was possible to order her with the necessary modifications.

Suilven was named after the mountain peak Suilven in Sutherland . She was bought off the stocks in 1974 and modified to comply with British standards for the Lewis service. She remained on the route until 1995, when she was replaced by the larger MV Isle of Lewis.

== Design ==
The car deck featured two lanes either side of the central casing and featured two hoistable mezzanine decks for additional car capacity. Car deck access was via a two-piece bow ramp and visor, with a single piece stern ramp. The superstructure featured a foremast above the wheel house carrying the radar scanners and aerials, and a main mast aft incorporated into the forward edge of the funnel, cleverly concealing the main engine exhausts. Her original single lounge bar saloon was soon divided with a screen to cordon off different areas. The cafeteria and servery was situated aft of the saloon and in common with vessels of the time, she was fitted out with a number of sleeping berths allowing passengers to embark the night before an early departure.

Early in her Caledonian MacBrayne career, she was fitted with stabilisers, improving stability. Suilven was the first vessel in the Caledonian MacBrayne fleet to carry the fleet branding on the hull side in large steel letters, welded to the hull side. Air conditioning was fitted for her service in Fiji.

== Service ==
Suilven was purchased for the Stornoway to Ullapool route, a replacement for the 1964 MV Clansman. She operated the route for 21 years, giving two crossings per day in summer reducing, until 1979, to one in winter. In October 1989, MV Isle of Mull's larger passenger capacity was required for those travelling to the Mòd in Stornoway. For those 10 days, Suilven took over the Oban-Craignure service.

By the 1990s, she was increasingly inadequate for the traffic on the service and unacceptably slow and the larger MV Isle of Lewis was built, offering superior capacity and facilities, entering service in July 1995.

No longer required in Scotland, she was sold to Strait Shipping, for service between the North Island and South Island of New Zealand. In 2004, she was moved to Fiji and operated between Suva, Savusavu (on Vanua Levu) and Taveuni.

In August 2012, Suilven was advertised for sale and expected to be sold as scrap for demolition; however, in late 2012, it was reported that Ben Naidu, owner of Venu Shipping, had acquired the ship for refitting and further service in Fiji, for an undisclosed sum. It was believed that, for the first time in her history, the ship would be renamed.

On 24 November 2015 Suilven capsized in Suva harbour. There were no passengers aboard as the ship was only carrying cargo at the time of the incident, the crew were rescued, no one injured.
