= Alpha (shipping company) =

Norwegian shipping company

AS Alpha
- Type: Private
- Industry: Shipping
- Founded: September 15, 1892; 134 years ago in Moss, Norway
- Founder: Jens Chr. Olsen
- Defunct: 1984
- Fate: Merged with Kosmos
- Headquarters: Moss, Norway
- Area served: Oslofjord
- Products: Moss–Horten Ferry

AS Alpha was a shipping company which operated in the Oslofjord of Norway. Initially founded in 1892 to operate a shipping line between Moss and Christiania (now Oslo), the company's main operation became the Moss–Horten Ferry which cross the Oslofjord. It also operated a service between Oslo and Fredrikstad and Sarpsborg. Alpha merged with Kosmos in 1984.

== History ==
=== Establishment ===
Moss had been connected to Christiania since the 1820 by steamship route. The 1855 opening of the Moss Canal allowed ships to avoid sailing around Jeløya, making it somewhat easier to serve Moss. However, the 1879 opening of the Østfold Line was detrimental for these shipping services. The railway was faster and cheaper, and took most of the traffic. Soon there were no ships sailing between Moss and the capital.

Jens Chr. Olsen was convinced that there was a market for a steamship line from Moss to Christiania, and in 1891 started agitating for the establishment of a Moss-based steamship company to serve in such a capacity. Olsen owned and operated one of the three port terminals in Moss, and observed the amount of cargo still passing through the port. It took over a year to raise interest and capital, but on 15 September 1892 the company could finally be incorporated at a meeting at Moss Hotel. As was common at the time, the company received the same name as its first ship. H. A. Knudtzon was elected chairman, a position he would hold for 39 years, until his death in 1933. Olsen became the inaugural managing director, a position he held for 29 years, until 1921.

The founding meeting decided to use its share capital of 25 thousand Norwegian kroner to order SS Alpha (1893) from Fredrikstad Mekaniske Verksted in Fredrikstad Municipality. She was launched in February 1893 with a capacity for 30 passengers and 60 tonnes of cargo, and entered service in July. Despite hopes of a balance between passengers and cargo, the latter completely dominated the revenue. It was evident that Alpha (1893) was not suited to attract passengers, so the company bought the used steamship Fyris from Sweden. She was cheap due to having a defect boiler. She just made it back to Moss before the boiler exploded, and a new had to be installed. She was renamed Alpha (1863) and the original Alpha (1893) sold.

=== Early expansion ===
The company experienced particularly heavy traffic during summer, and bought the ship Patriot, renaming her Beta (1869). She had a much larger capacity, for 278 passengers. This allowed the summer services to be extended south to also call at Larkollen, Hankø and Fredrikstad. Further enlargement was done in 1904 with the delivery of the third Alpha (1904) from Moss Mekaniske Verksted, with a capacity for 378 passengers and 100 tonnes of freight. Alpha (1863) was sold.

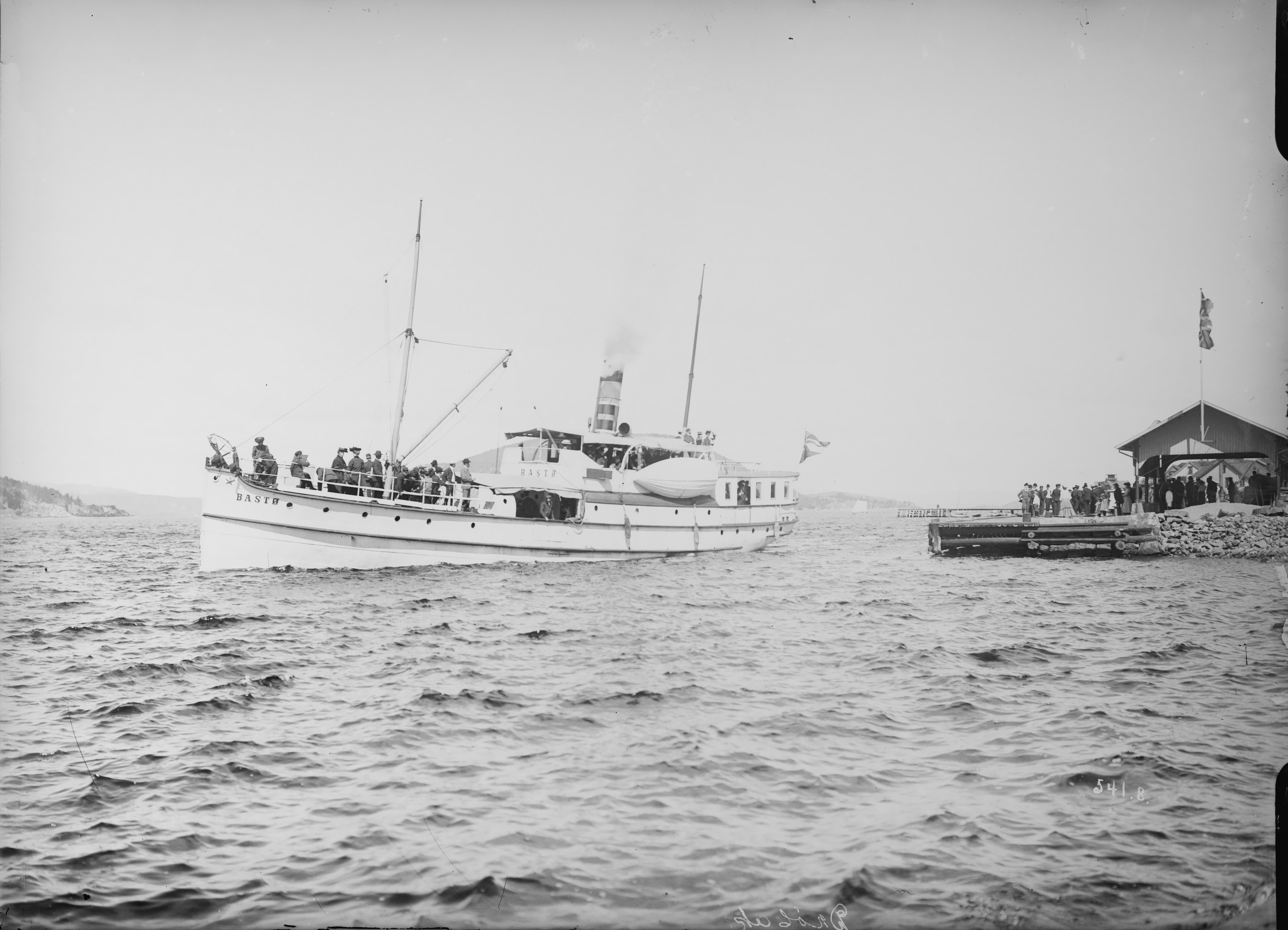
SS Bastø (1885) departing Drøbak

A merger was discussed with Nesodden Dampskibsselskap in 1910, but ultimately fell through. Instead, in December Alpha bought Moss–Horten Dampskibsselskab from Richard Peterson, who ran a ship line between Moss and Horten. For 152 thousand kroner, the purchase included the ships SS Bastø (1885) and SS Bastø II (1900). Bastø was transferred to the Kristiania route.

Continuing their expansion, Alpha bought the Sarpsborg vessels Glommen I and Glommmen II, along with the operations of a route from Christiania to Fredrikstad and Sarpsborg. These were supplemented with a used purchase of Fragtemand, renamed Glommen III.

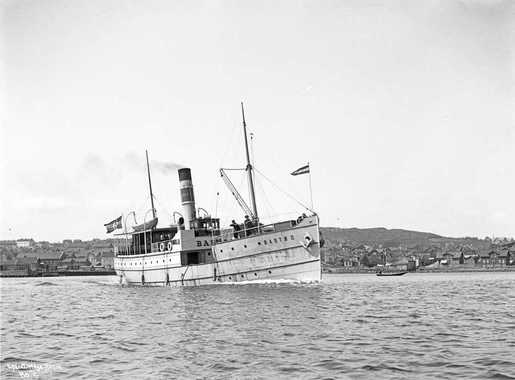
SS Bastø II (1900)

Alpha was a profitable company. Shares in the company were widely held amongst the wealthier population in Moss. Many of the owners were also customers, so they retained both a vested interest in low and high prices.

The First World War gave an industrial boom with high demand for transport service. It also saw wages and costs escalat, especially coal, the price of which increased eleven-fold. This led to some financially challenging years, the worst being 1921, when the company both struggled with a strike and high inflation. Olsen resigned as managing director in 1921, due to poor health, and was replaced by Gustav C. A. Amundsen. He would continue in that role for 35 years, until 1956.

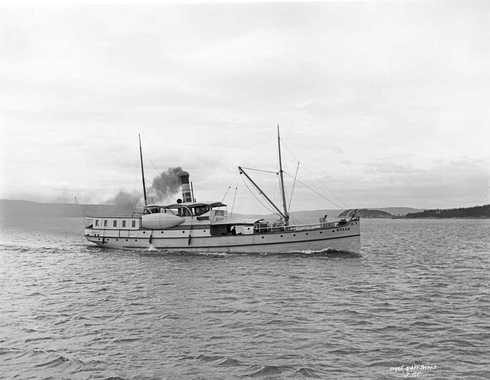
SS Bastø (1885)

By 1923, Glommen III had been sold, and was that year replaced with a new ship with the same name. Bastø (1885) was sold in 1928, and replaced with the used ship Beta II on the summer-only route from Oslo and Moss to Fredrikstad. It was sold after a few years.

Corporate finances improved throughout the 1920, but turned sour again from 1928. For six years the company did not pay dividends. Prices fell due to increased competition from the railway and the increasing number of trucks. In 1927, some of the major customers established a competing company, Moss Dampskibsselskap, bought SS Moss and put it into service between Moss and Oslo. The issue was resolved by Alpha buying Moss in 1930. With no particular use for her, she was sold in 1933.

The company was uncertain of how profitable the services to Oslo were. Fares were kept low due to intense competition, and the board considered selling the Glommen ships several times. In the end they decided to carry out a major cost-cutting program, selling Glommen III in 1938, and ordering new engines for the other two.

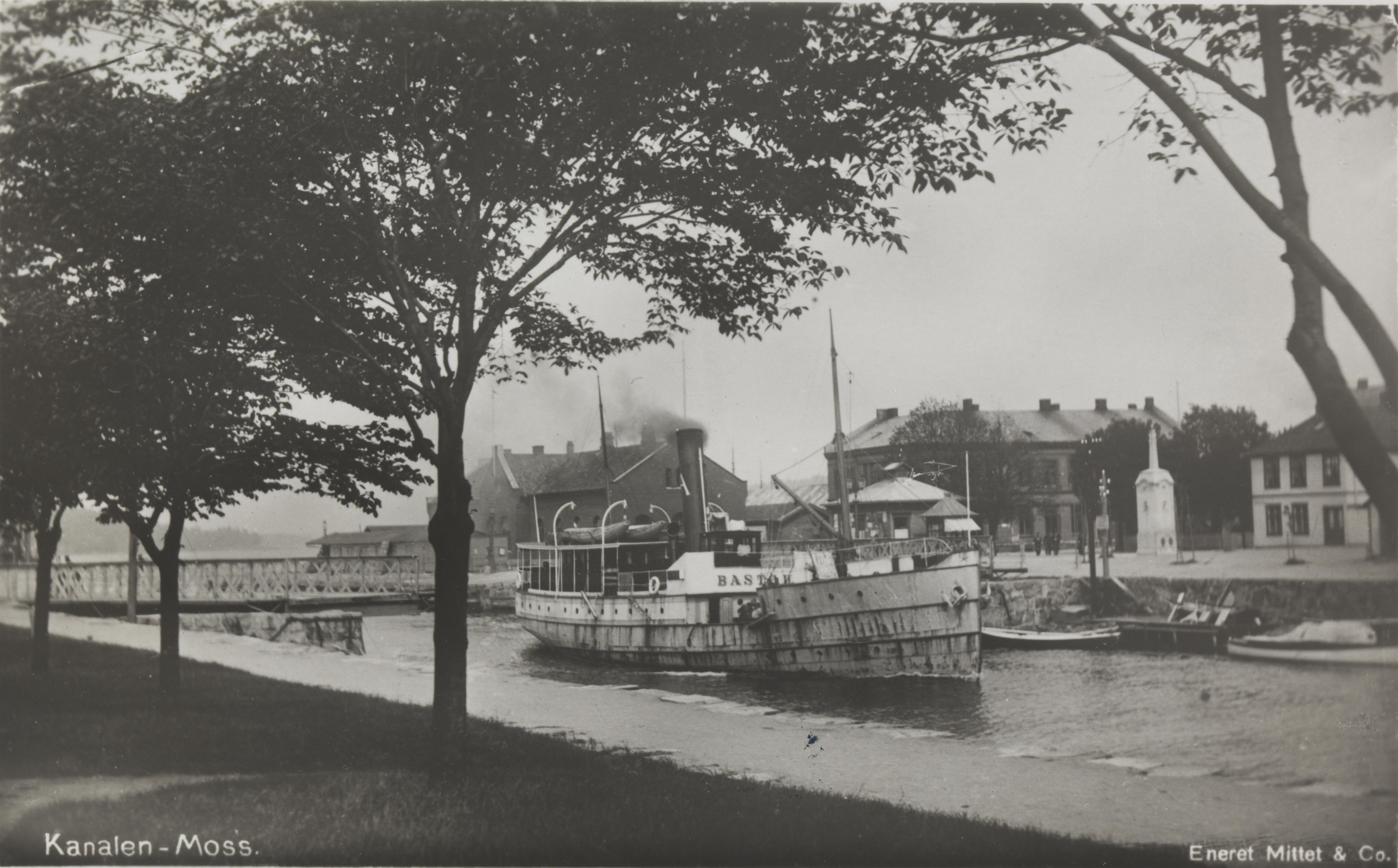
SS Bastø II (1900) at Moss in the early 1930s

=== Traffic boom across the fjord ===
The company understood that it was the Moss–Horten service which would be its future lifeline. As a commercial route, but without any competitors, Alpha could operate it as a monopoly. The only restraint was that it needed to keep prices sufficiently low that no other shipping companies take up on the route. Alpha was predominantly owned by people in Moss. Although it was in high esteem there, there was more discontent in Horten and Vestfold. A self-organized "ferry committee" was established in Vestfold in 1928, and attempted at establishing a competing company. Their calculations were dependent on building a railway ferry, for which they needed the Vestfold Line to undergo gauge conversion. In the end, nothing came of the proposal.

The ferry experienced a huge car traffic spike from 1932 to 1933, making it evident that Bastø II (1900) soon would need replacement. A new ship was ordered in September 1933. In order to fund the purchase, Alpha carried out an emission, and marketed the shares also in Vestfold, in order to increase ownership also there. Among others, the chairman of the ferry committee became a significant shareholder.

SS Bastø (1934) was delivered on 1 June 1934. Built by Moss Værft & Dokk, she had a capacity for 18 cars and 400 passengers. Ideally the company wanted a roll-on/roll-off (ro-ro) ferry, which could be loaded from the ships bow and stern, but instead they were driven on and off via a side ramp. The quays on both sides were upgraded for the new ferry, but neither municipality could afford the docks Alpha wanted. Bastø was put into seven daily round-trip crossings, with an extra daily service in July and August. Bastø II (1900) was slightly rebuilt and was renamed Beta (1900) the following year, after Beta (1869) had been broken.

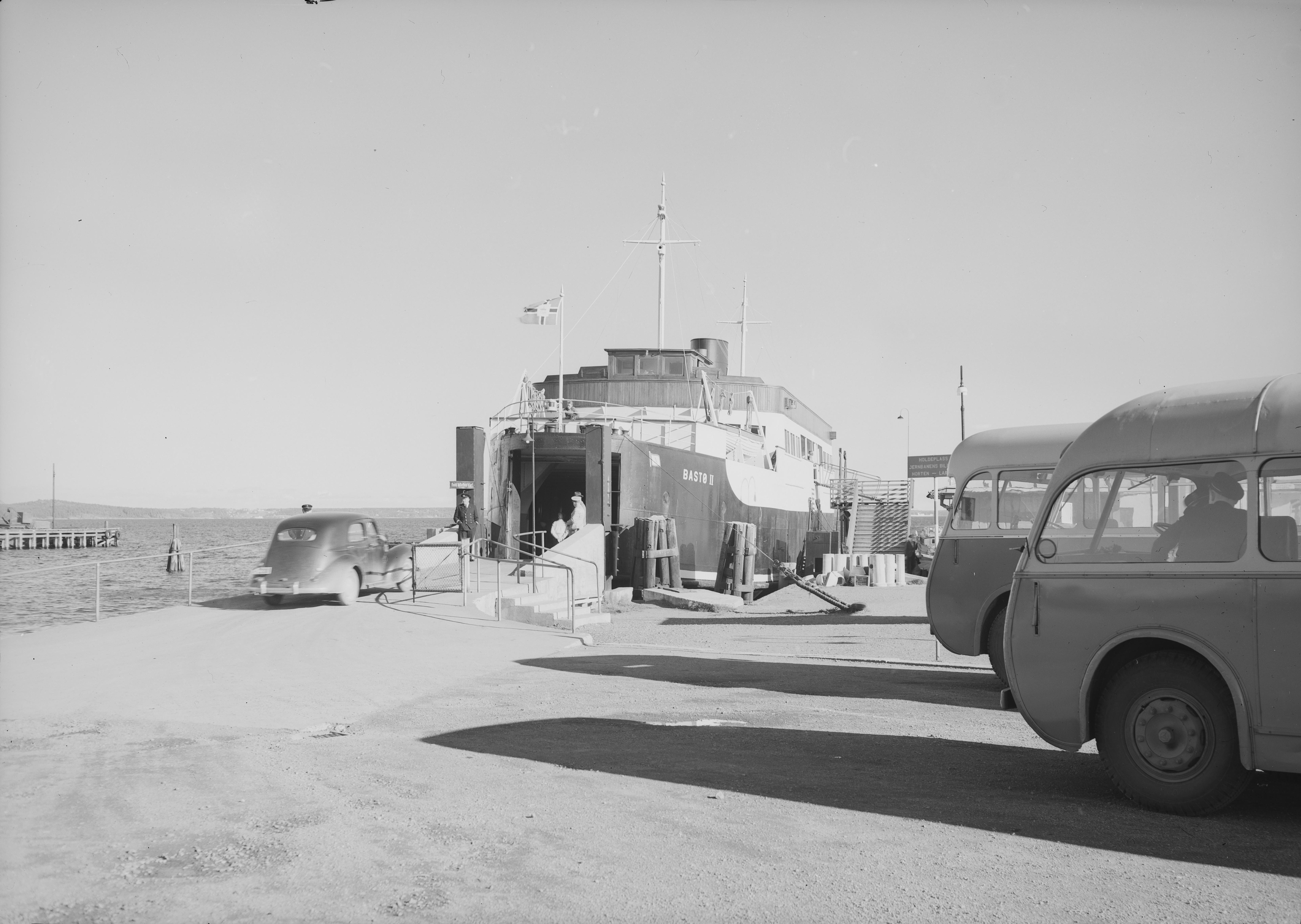
MF Bastø II (1939) loading at Horten in 1950. She was Alpha's first roll on/roll off vessel.

Car traffic exploded in the following years, from three thousand annual cars in 1933 to eighteen thousand in 1939. Queues at the quays grew, to large frustration for the travelling public. Alpha ordered a new ship in 1937, which was delivered two years later. Named DS Bastø II (1939), she was a ro-ro ferry with capacity for 34 cars and 600 passengers, costing 810 thousand kroner. She was put into service as the main ferry, while Bastø (1934) was kept as a reserve. Alpha and Beta were leased to the Royal Norwegian Navy from September 1939.

When Damm launched the Norwegian edition of the board game Monopoly in 1937, the Bastø Ferry was included as one of four shipping companies, replacing the original railway stations. The other three were the Norwegian America Line, the Bergen Steamship Company and, in a twist of fate, Kosmos.

=== Second World War ===
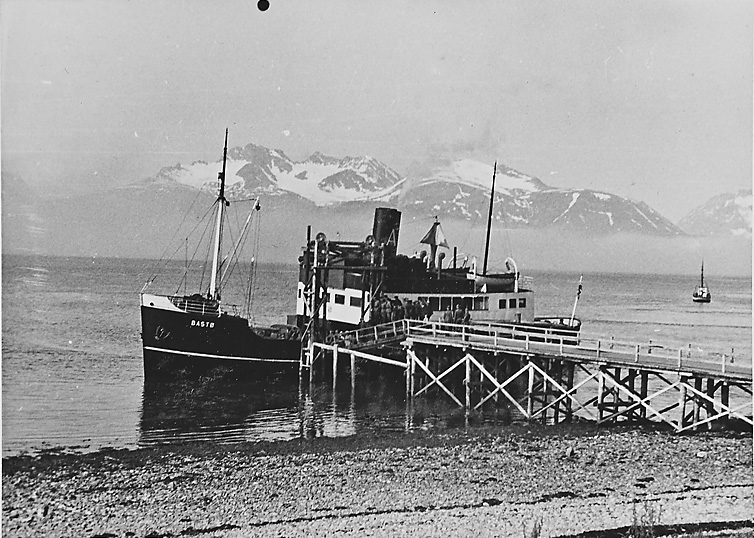
SS Bastø (1934) in Lyngen during the Second World War.

Bastø II continued operating all day on 9 April 1940, during the German invasion of Norway, as waves of Kriegsmarine warships and flocks of Luftwaffe aircraft made their way up the Oslofjord. Norway's main navy base at Karljohansvern in Horten was under bombardment, with the Norwegian Navy returning fire. The odd minesweeper and fighter approached the ferry, but ignored her once they realized she was a civilian vessels. Traffic was heavy, as many people needed to cross the fjord. In the evening, Horten was evacuated, and many of the town's population fled with the ferry. Wharf supervisor Hansen, who let loose Bastø II's last moorings, is said to have been the only person to spend the night in town. Services were terminated the next day, but resumed on 13 April and continued in a reduced capacity until late 1944.

During the German occupation of Norway, the Germany authorities gradually requisitioned all but one of Alpha's ships. Alpha was sold in 1940. Bastø was moved to Northern Norway, where she remained until damaged by a fire in January 1944 and returned. The Glommen vessels were all requisitioned; I and II were returned, while IV sank near Kirkenes. Bastø II was kept on the Moss–Horten service until late 1944, when it was also requisitioned. Beta was put into the service until January 1945, when Bastø was finished with repairs and put into service. She was supplemented by Bastø II from 7 July. All in all, Alpha made good profits during the war. A wooden ship, Glommen III, was bought in 1946 to replace Glommen IV.

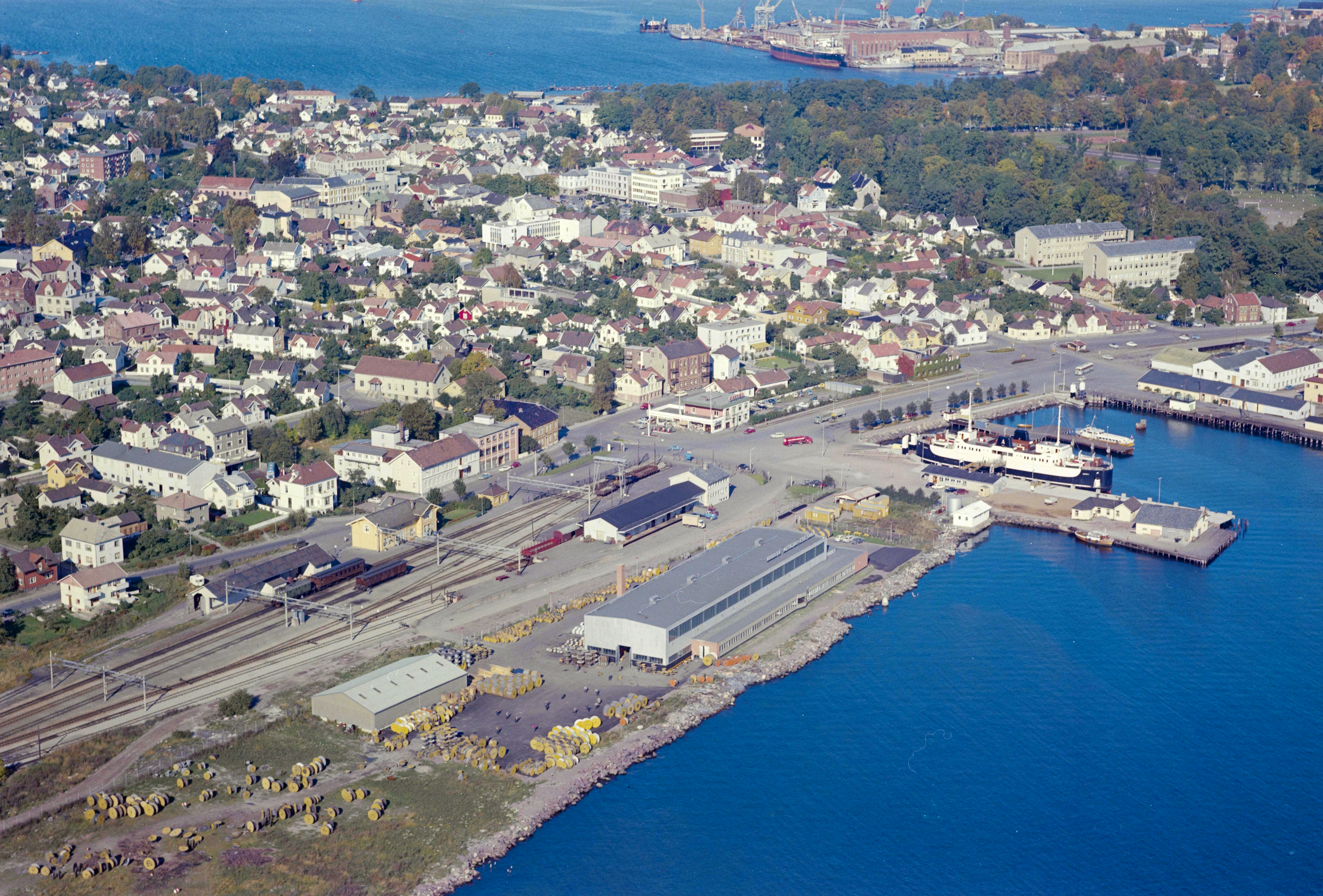
Horten in 1964, with the ferry quay and Horten Station, showing the close priximity between the railway and the ferry.

=== Proposed railway ferry ===
Both quays of the Moss–Horten service were right at the railway, Moss Station and Horten Station, respectively. Moss Municipality established a committee in 1914 which looked into if a railway ferry should be built between the two stations. It spent eleven years before it came with a positive conclusion. Additional proposals would follow, although nothing ever materialized. A major issue was the break of gauge between the Østfold Line and the Vestfold Line, making through trains impossible. The Vestfold Line was rebuilt to standard gauge in 1949, which renewed proposals for a railway ferry.

=== All inn on the Bastø Ferry ===
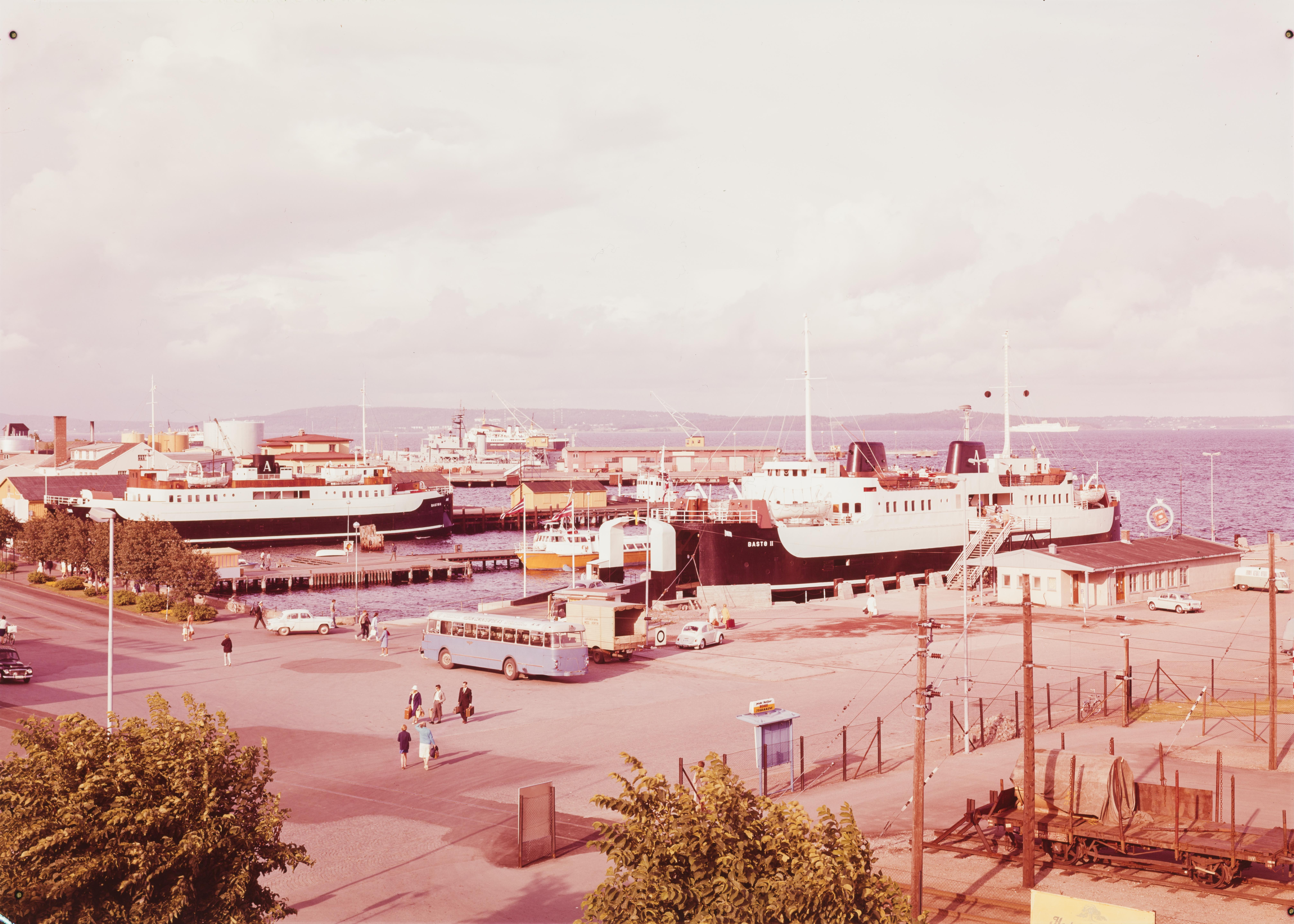
MF Bastø II (1961) and MF Bastø III (1949) at dock in Horten

By 1946, traffic had doubled compared to 1939, and increased capacity was needed between Moss and Horten. Alpha ordered a new ship in January 1947, which entered service in September 1949 as Bastø (1949). It was a sister ship to Bastø II (1939), but with a slightly larger lounge and more efficient use of the car deck.

Alpha terminated its passenger services to Oslo from 1950. Beta (1900) and Alpha (1934) were sold in 1951 and 1952. The service was, however, retained between Oslo and Fredrikstad/Sarpsborg with the Glommen ships, from 1955 with only one of them in service. The last of the Glommen ships was sold in 1962. Alpha terminated all its port terminal operations in 1966. From then on, Alpha focused entirely on the Moss–Horten Ferry.

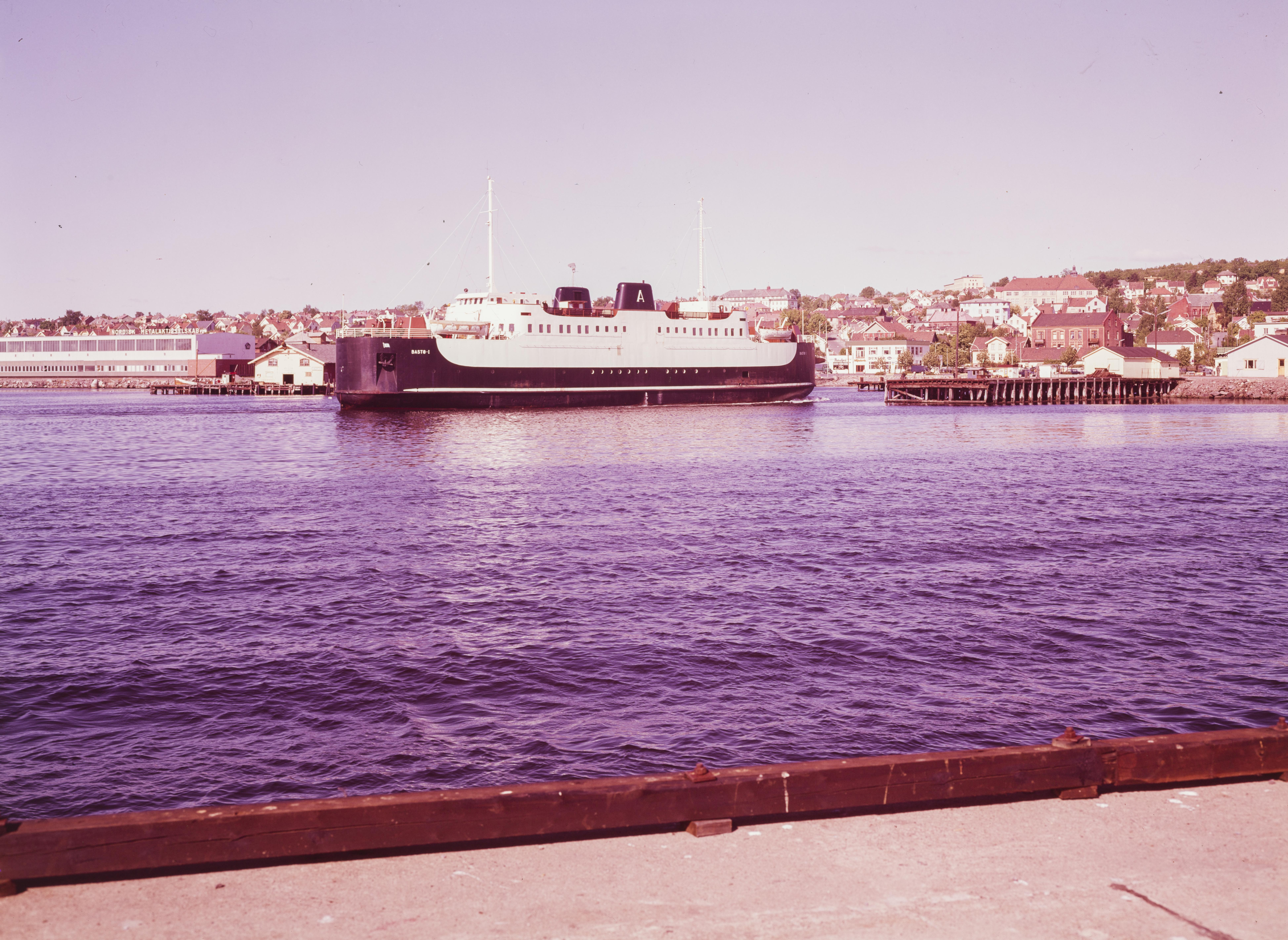
MF Bastø I (1956) departing Horten in 1964

Amundsen retired as CEO in 1956, and was replaced by Harald Egers. He again would become the company's shortest-serving CEO, with only ten years. He was replaced by Nils Brokstad, who would remain in that position for the rest of Alphas operating years, and continue on running the division until 1988 as part of Kosmos.

By 1956, annual traffic on the Moss–Horten route passed one hundred thousand cars. Alpha decided to solve the issue by building a third vessel for the route. Although similar in overall design to the existing two ferries, she had a capacity for 55 cars and 600 passengers, with a speed of 11 knots (20 km/h; 13 mph). The new ferry was named Bastø I (1956), while the old Bastø I was renamed Bastø III. The new Bastø I became the new standard for Alphas ships, and three more sister ships were delivered, in 1961 (Bastø II), 1964 (Bastø IV) and 1968 (Bastø III). The old Bastø II (1939) was sold in 1961, and the old Bastø III (1949) sold in 1969.

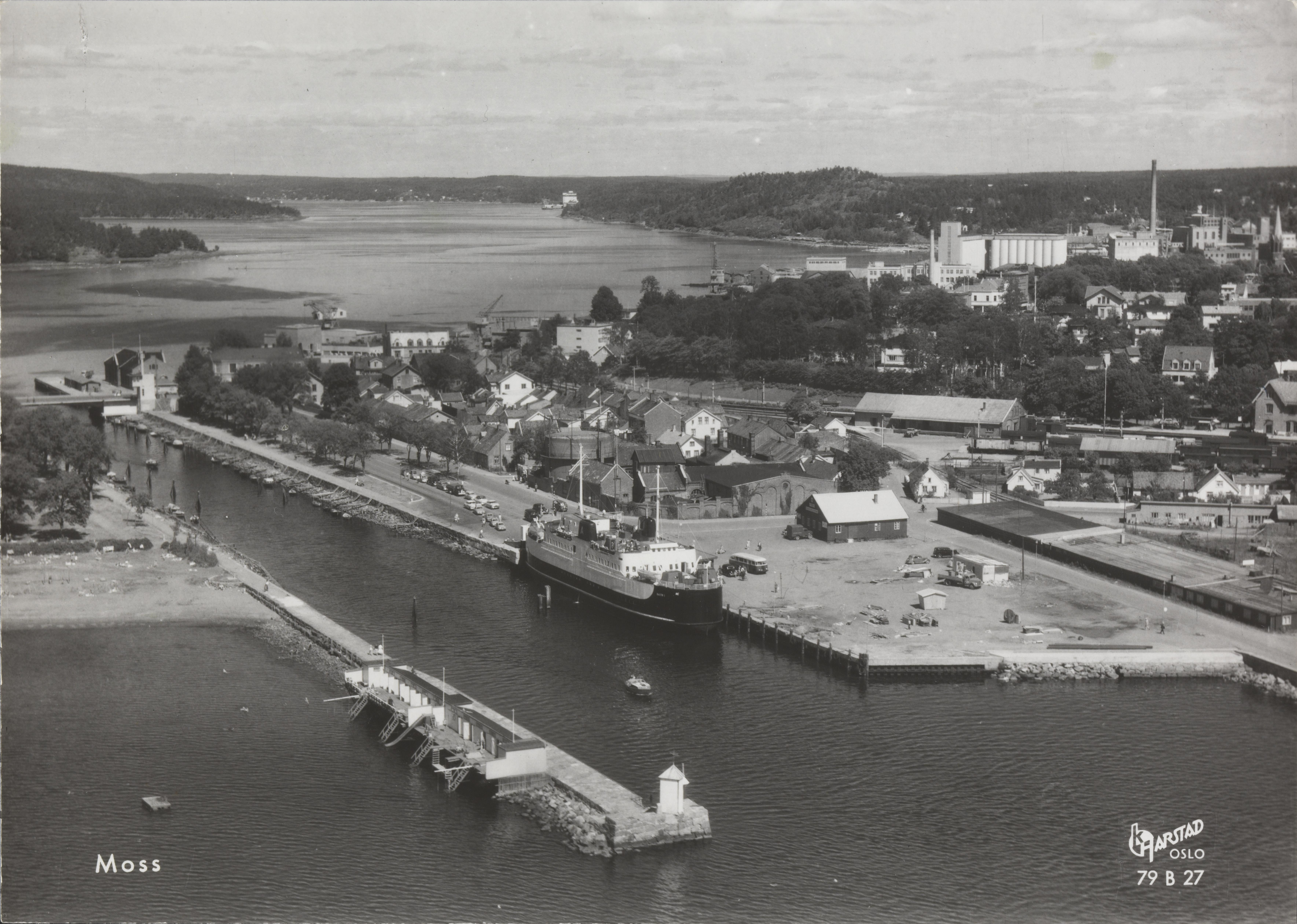
MF Bastø I at dock in Moss

The new Bastø I was built as a combined car and railway ferry, although it was never used to transport trains. By the second ship was built, any plans to act as a railway ferry had been abandoned, and none of the other received tracks. With four sister ships, Alpha could operate with four ships in service during the summer, and two the rest of the year. To keep their concession, the authorities demanded high reliability and ample spare capacity. Four ships allowed for continued operation, even if a single ferry broke down. Scheduled maintenance was kept to the off-season. Small ships allowed for quick turn-around times even with a single file. As an added bonus, passengers experienced frequent departures.

Norway experienced a car ferry boom during the 1960s. The operations of these ferries were most places left to private enterprise, and so Alpha being a private car ferry operator was the norm. However, most ferries had insufficient traffic to turn a profit. The government there devised a system to subsidize the operations. Alpha was one of only three ferry operators, along with Rutelaget Askøy–Bergen and Mjøsfærgene, who did not receive subsidies, as they had sufficient traffic to turn a profit. From 1968 a standardized system of national ticket fees were introduced, and regulated by the government. Alpha was not obliged to follow these fees, but chose to do so on its own accord.

=== Fewer and larger ferries ===
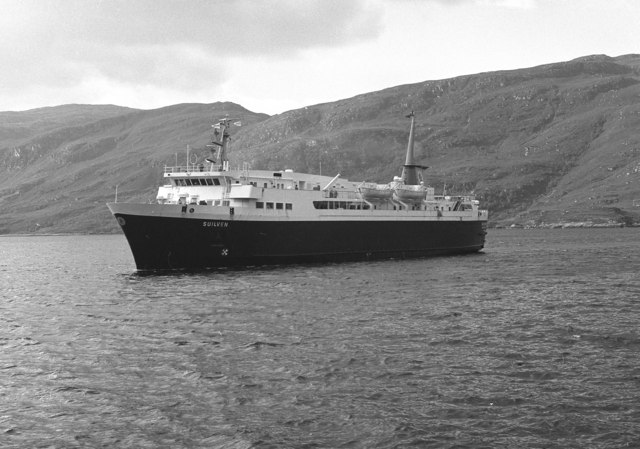
MV Suilven was the twin ship of Bastø V (1973), which was sold to Caledonian MacBrayne before she was completed.

By the 1970s traffic had again outpaced the fleet's capacity. Although adding additional small ferries had provided operational flexibility, it was becoming an expensive mode of operation. Lage wage hikes and recruitment challenges led to spike in costs, which could not be covered through increased revenue. Brokstad there decided to buy a larger ferry. It would be used on the Moss–Horten service during summer, and leased abroad during the off-season. Two ships were ordered in 1972, one for this purpose (Bastø V, 1973) and one which Alpha hoped to sell for a profit. The bottom fell out of the shipping market during the oil crisis and so the speculative ship only ended up producing a net profil of 3.7 million kroner once sold to Caledonian MacBrayne, naming her MV Suilven.

Alpha made a deal with Strömstad Municipality for a service between Strömstad in Sweden and Tønsberg to use Bastø V in the off season. Instead of entering the Moss–Horten line, Bastø V was therefore initially put into a service from Tønsberg to Strömstad. This route ended up losing 2 million kroner and was terminated after the first season. Thereafter Bastø V was run on the Moss–Horten service during the summer, and leased to various operators in the Mediterranean Sea and the Persian Gulf for each winter season. She was demoted to a reserve ferry in 1980 and sold the following year.

While traffic continued to rise during the 1970s, the regulations hindered Alpha from rising ticket fees as much as costs rose. This led to several years with losses. A a compensation, the authorities from 1974 allowed Alpha to introduce summer fees which were fifty percent higher than the off season. This allowed Alpha to charge more to the tourist, which dominated during the summer, rather than the local population.

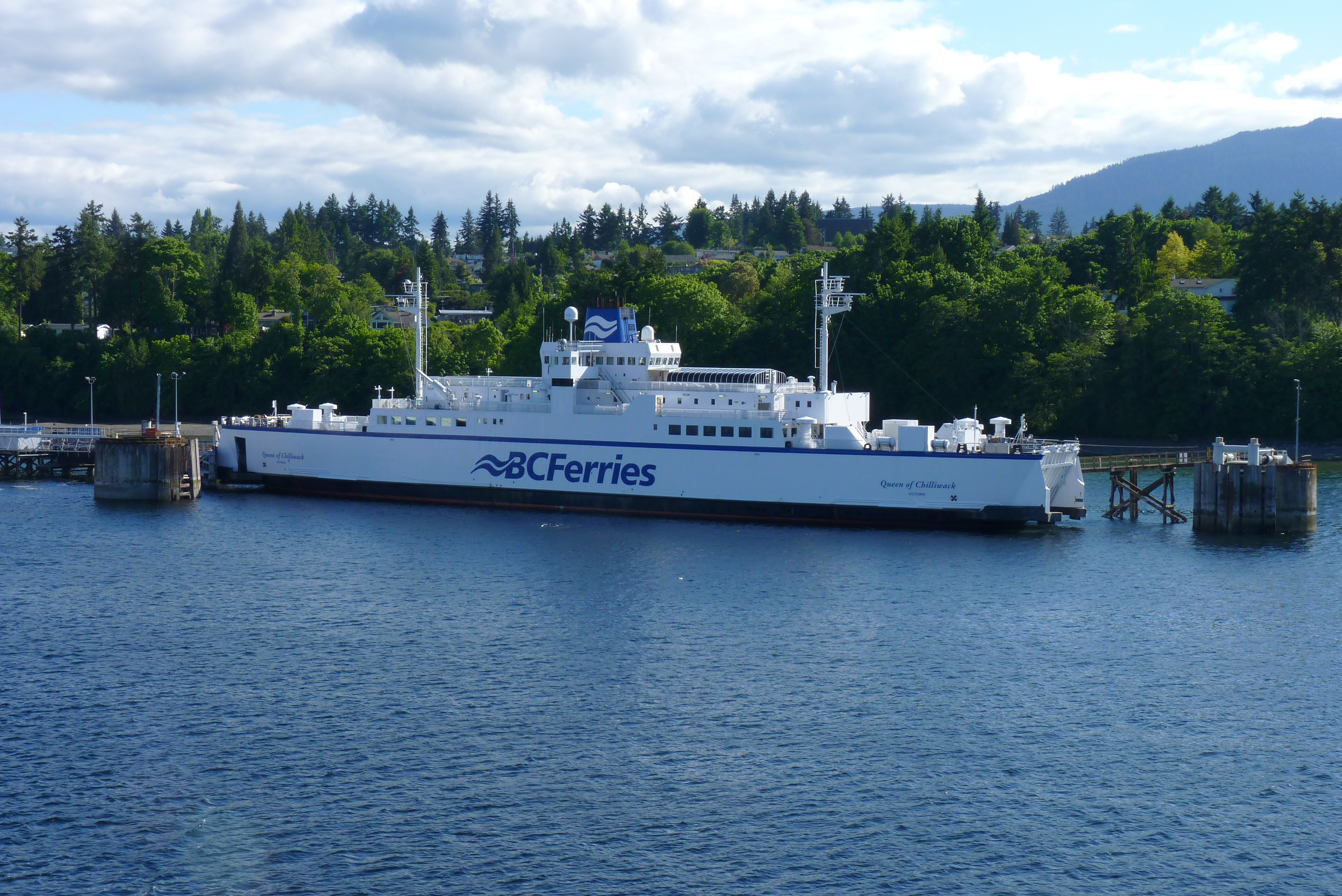
Alpha took deliverty Bastø I in 1978. She was sold to BC Ferries in 1991, where she served as the Queen of Chilliwack

Brokstad decided that he wanted to have two larger ferries instead of four smaller ones. Bastø V had shown the ease of loading larger amounts. Two sisterships were ordered, with capacity for 190 cars and 700 passengers. Part of the loading and unloading time would be compensated by a faster speed, at 15 knots (28 km/h; 17 mph). Bastø I was delivered on 6 June 1978 and Bastø II was delivered on 8 June 1979. The new ferries had loading and unloading on two parallel files, could manoeuver more accurately at dock due to thrusters. They had much lower operating costs per vehicle than the old ferries, with the same number of crew despite more than three times the capacity. This allowed the company to downsize from 147 to 103 employees.

Three of the four sisters were sold those years, with Bastø III (1968) kept as a reserve until 1985. Passenger loading terminals were built at both quays in 1983, separating passenger and car traffic.

After the traffic having grown all through the 1970s, reached a temporary peak in 1979 at 650.000 cars per year, a level not reached again until 1984. The new ferries allowed the company to make a significant profit in the following years. Most of it was kept and invested in various properites and other assets.

=== Sale to Kosmos ===
In 1983, a share in Alpha was trading for 4000 kroner. The shares in Alpha were never listed on any exchange. The main way of purchasing and selling was through the classified ads in Moss Avis. Ownership was massively spread, with 500 individuals owning the company's 1400 shares.

Starting in 1980s, there was a boom in mergers and acquisitions and the creation of conglomerates. Shipbroker Rolf M. Hjelseth was in 1984 specializing in buying up smaller shipping companies and then liquidating them by selling their assets for a profit. He was able to do this because many owners were unaware of the true assets of their companies. After buying the Moss-based A/S Aspelund, Hjelseth was left with a number of shares in Alpha.

Hjelseth later claimed that he believed that Alpha was Norway's most undervalued company. He estimated each share be worth 45 thousand kroner, ten times the going rate. Instead of bying shares from the many individual owners, he contacted the company's management and offered 25 thousand kroner each for all the shares in the company. His efforts were met with resistance. Brokstad understood that Hjelseth would want to liquidate all the company's non-core assets, even though the greatest value lay in continued ferry operations. Management had held substantial power in the company, as there were no large shareholders who could overrule them. With a single owner, the power balance in the company might shift.

The board came to regard Hjelseth as a hostile take-over, and instead started looking for a company that they could partner up and would be willing to buy the company. On 23 November the board stated that they did not recommend shareholders sell to Hjelseth. After some deliberation, the boarded landed on Kosmos and contacted its CEO Bjørn Bettum. Merger negotiations started on 29 November. Kosmos proposed a merger and offered 250 shares in themselves for each Alpha-share, valuing them at 45 thousand kroner each based on the market value on the Oslo Stock Exchange. Hjelseth came the next day with a counter-offer of 45 thousand in cash for each share, but only if he could secure 925 shares. Kosmos raised their bid to 260 shares. This was recommended by the board, and most of the shareholders excepted. Also helping the Kosmos bid was that a merger would give a tax advantage over an outright sale.

Kosmos' motiations was a diversification strategy that it was following at the time. Traditionally a shipping company, in the 1980s it also entered thre more strategic areas: tourism, domestic transport and industry. The Moss–Horten Ferry fit well into this, in addition to it being close to its home turf in Sandefjord.

Alpha was merged into Kosmos in 1984. Instead of being a subsidiary, it became an operating division, with head office in Moss and with Brokstad as director. It was named Bastøfergen, and retained its own branding distinct from Kosmos.

The division was spun out in a management buyout when Bettum bought the division in 1989 to create the operating company Gokstad. It remained the operator of the Moss–Horten Ferry till the end of 1995, after which operations were taken over by Bastø Fosen.

== Fleet ==
List of ships operating by Alpha
Name	Built	Shipyard	Cars	Pax	Start	End	Notes	Ref
SS Alpha	1893	Fredrikstad Mekaniske Værksted	0	30	1893	1894		
SS Alpha	1863		0		1894	1904		
SS Beta	1869		0	278	1904	1935		
SS Alpha	1904	Moss Mekaniske Værksted	0	378	1904	1940		
SS Bastø	1885		0		1910	1928		
SS Bastø II	1900	Akers mekaniske Verksted	5	260	1910	1951	Renamed SS Beta in 1935.	
SS Glommen I	1911	Moss Verft	0	40	1914	1948		
SS Glommen II	1912	Moss Verft	0	40	1914	1962	Converted from steam to diesel in 1938	
SS Glommen III			0		1914		Sold no later than 1923	
SS Glommen III			0		1923	1938		
SS Beta II			0		1928		Sold after a few years	
SS Moss			0		1930	1933		
SS Bastø	1934	Moss Værft & Dokk	18	400	1934	1952	Renamed DS Alpha in 1949.	
MS Glommen IV	1937	Lindstøls Skips og Båtbyggeri	0		1937	1944	First motor vessel. Sank off Kirkenes.	
SS Glommen III	1946		0		1946	1955		
MF Bastø II	1939		34	600	1939	1961		
MF Bastø	1949		34	600	1949	1969	Renamed MF Bastø III in 1956 and MF Beta in 1968	
MF Bastø I	1956	Pusnes Mekaniske Verksted	55	600	1956	1979	Renamed MF Bastø IV in 1978	
MF Bastø II	1961		55	600	1961	1979	Renamed MF Bastø IV in 1979	
MF Bastø IV	1964	Moss Værft & Dokk	55	600	1964	1978		
MF Bastø III	1968		55	600	1968	1985		
MF Bastø V	1973	Moss Verft	120	700	1973	1981		
Bastø I	1978	Framnæs Mekaniske Værksted	190	700	1989	1991		
Bastø II	1979	Moss Verft	190	700	1989	1995		

== Bibliography ==
- Boye, Tore (2005). Anders Jahres pengebinge (in Norwegian). Baltic Business Development. ISBN 82-996932-0-9.
- Hansen, Finn R. (2001). Selskapet og dets fartøyer: Fosen Trafikklag ASA (in Norwegian).
- Ryggvik, Helge; Søilen, Espen (1992). Bastøfergen: Fra damplekter til brikke i pengespillet (in Norwegian). Sandefjord: Gokstad.
- Schulstad, Per (1967). Aktieselskapet Alpha gjennom 75 år (in Norwegian). Moss.
