= MS Alandia =

MS Alandia may refer to:

- MF Bastø II (1939), named MS Alandia between 1962 and 1976
- MS Rahal, named MS Alandia between 1992 and 2006
