= MF Bastø (1949) =

Ship built in 1949

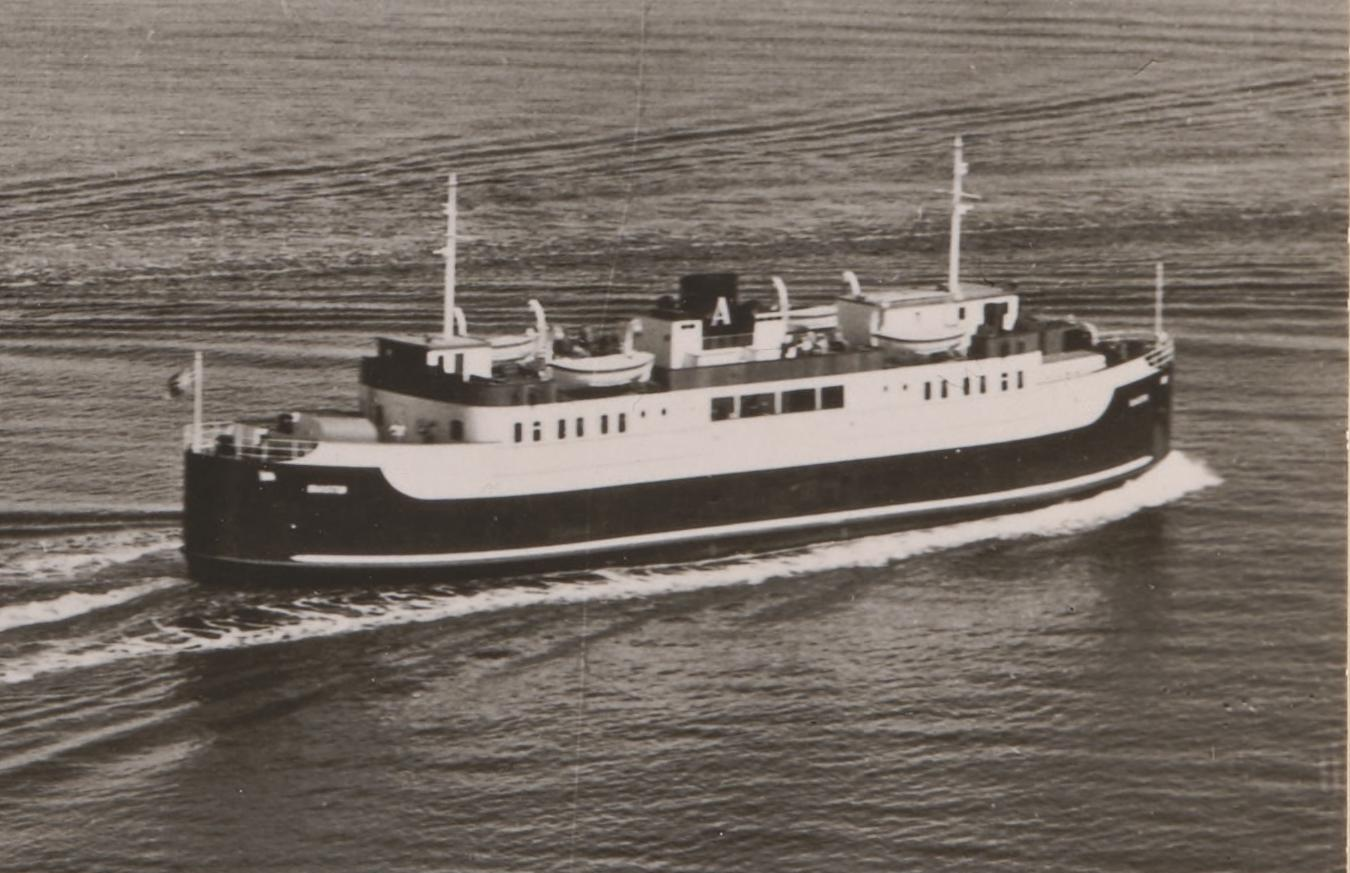

History
- Name: MF Bastø (1949–56); MF Bastø III (1956–68); MF Beta (1968–69); Marina (1969–70); Anna II (1970–72); Sapo III (1972–81); Balaia (1981–)
- Owner: Alpha (1939–61); Investor (1969–70); Birger Svensen & Sønner (1972–75); Scan Barge AS Offshore Services (1975–80); Fekete & Co (1980–)
- Operator: Alpha (1939–61); Investor (1969–70); Birger Svensen & Sønner (1972–75); Scan Barge AS Offshore Services (1975–80); Fekete & Co (1980–)
- Port of registry: Moss (1949–68)
- Route: Moss–Horten (1949–68)
- Ordered: January 1947
- Builder: Moss Værft & Dokk
- Cost: NOK 3,170,000
- Yard number: 115
- In service: 24 July 1949
- Identification: IMO number: 5037876; Call sign: LNZB
- Fate: Unknown

General characteristics
- Type: Ferry
- Tonnage: 485 GRT / 202 NRT
- Length: 54.82 m (179.9 ft)
- Beam: 10.11 m (33.2 ft)
- Draught: 3.5 m (11 ft)
- Installed power: 662 kW (900 hp)
- Propulsion: Gebrüder Sulzer diesel engine
- Speed: 14 kn (26 km/h; 16 mph)
- Capacity: 34 cars; 600 passengers

MF Bastø was a bidrectional roll-on/roll-off passenger and road vehicle ferry built in 1934 by Moss Værft & Dokk for Alpha, who put her into service on the Moss–Horten crossing of the Oslofjord in Norway. She was later renamed MF Bastø III and MF Beta.

Alpha sold her in 1969, when she was renamed Marinen and used as a restaurant ship. The ship caught on fire and then capsized 17 December 1969. After being salvaged, she was rebuilt as a barge. She had various owners, who variously named her Anna II, Sapo III and Balaia.

== Specifications ==
The ship was a steel-hull, bidirectional passenger and road vehicle ferry, with a capacity for 34 cars and 600 passengers. She had a length of 54.82 meters (179.9 ft), a beam of 10.11 meters (33.2 ft) and a draught of 3.5 meters (11 ft). This gave her a giving her a register tonnage of 484 gross and 202 net. She was powered by a Gebrüder Sulzer diesel engine with a power output of 662 kW (900 hp), giving her a cruising speed of 14 knots (26 km/h; 16 mph).

== History ==
=== Career with Alpha ===
Alpha had taken order of MF Bastø II, its first proper roro ferry with aft and stern loading of road vehicles, and which was used on the Moss–Horten route. They were quite happy with the design, so they ordered a sister ship with almost the same specifications, only with a slightly larger lounge and more efficient use of the car deck.

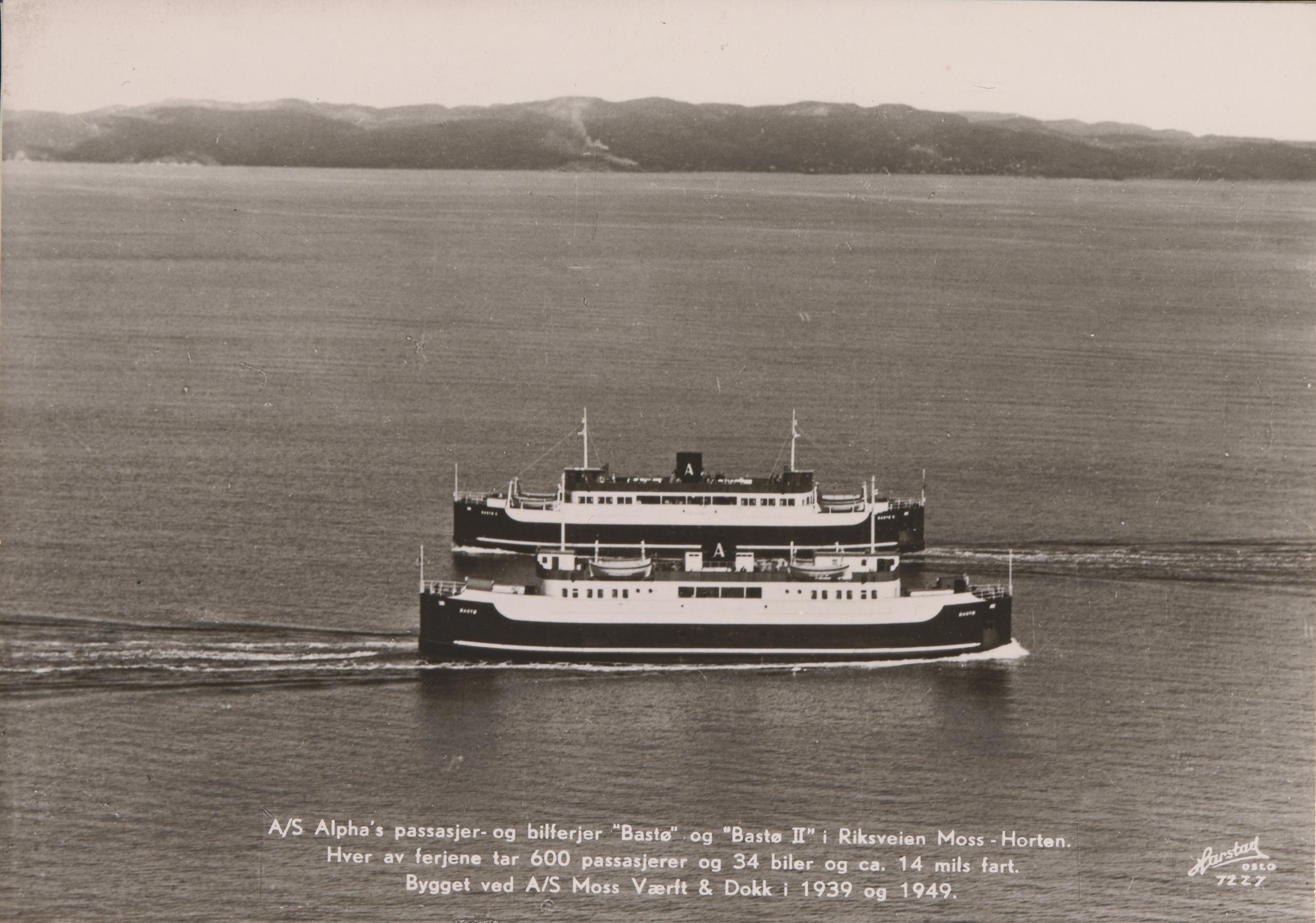
MF Bastø (front) and her sister ship MF Bastø II (1939). Although quite similar in design, the newer ferry has a slightly larger lounge.

By 1946, traffic had doubled compared to 1939, and increased capacity was needed between Moss and Horten. Alpha ordered a new ship in January 1947 from Moss Værft & Dokk which cost 3,170,000 kroner. She entered service on 24 July 1949, before she was completely furnished, on the Moss–Horten route.

The Royal Norwegian Navy was interested in having access to ships available to do minelaying of the Oslofjord. Bastø was there built minelaying facilities. She was leased to the navy in October 1949 for minelaying tests for a week, and again for a month in May and June 1952 and for a few days in 1959.

A further fleet expansion began in 1956, with the delivery of what would become four sister ships, which would make Bastø redunant. A new Bastø I was delivered in 1956. To free up the name, the old Bastø was renamed Bastø III. The three ships were all used during the summer peak season, while only two were used in the off-season, leaving one in reserve and allowed them to rotate through scheduled maintenance.

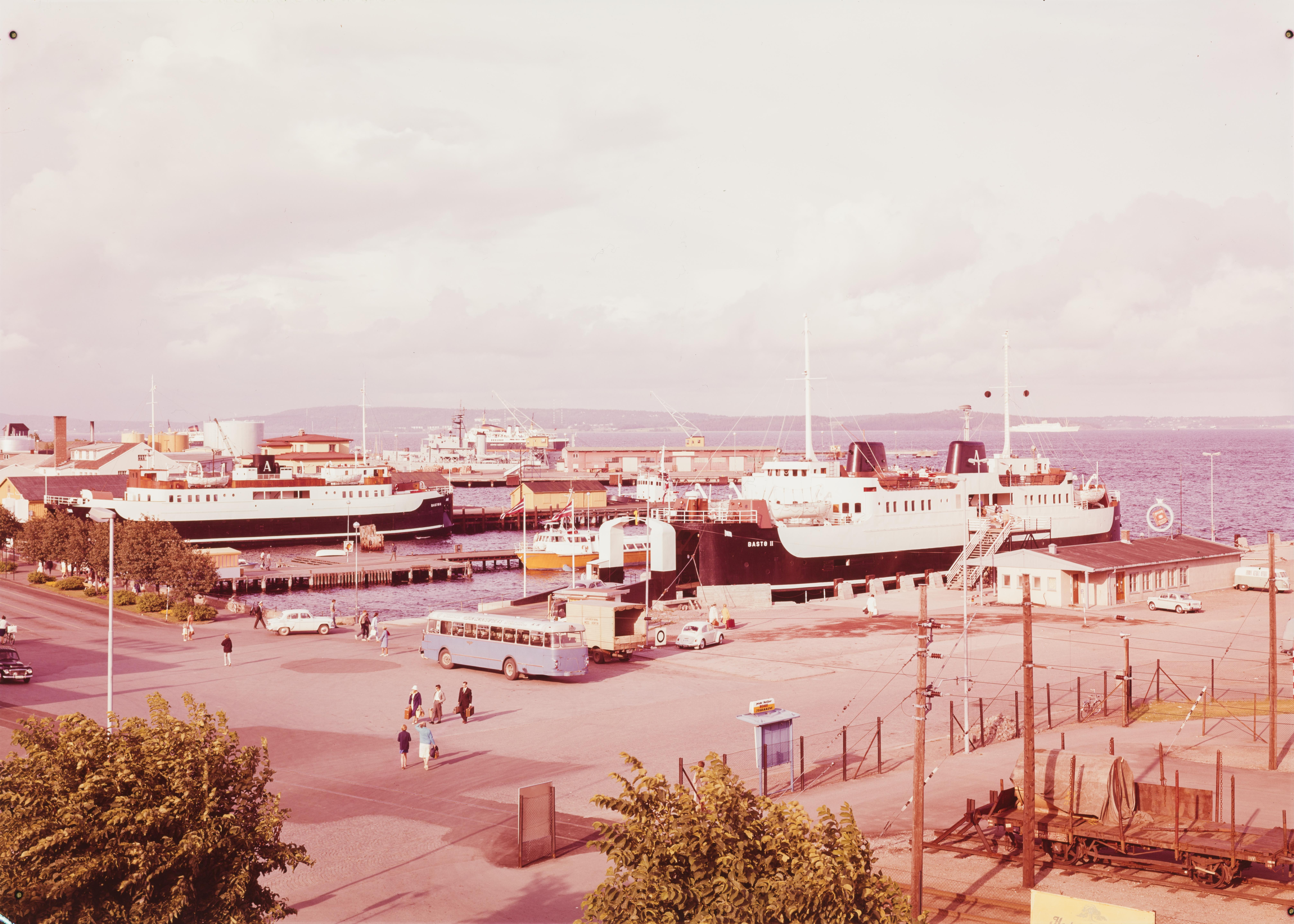
Bastø III (left) along with MF Bastø II (1961) in Horten in 1966

A new Bastø II was delivered in 1961, followed by MF Bastø IV in 1964, and a new MF Bastø III in 1968. To free up the name, the old Bastø III was named Beta. With four ferries in use, Alpha no longer had any need for Beta, and put her up for sale.

=== Later career ===
The ship was sold to Investor AS of Moss for 350,000 kr on 27 May 1969. They named her Marina on 14 June 1969 and towed her to Havna Hotell in Tjøme Municipality for use as a restaurant ship. Later that year she was towed to Grand Hotel in Skien, where she was also used as a restaurant ship. On 17 December, Marina caught on fire while docked at Fiskeslepet Quay. She was filled with water during the fire fighting operation, and capsized. She was salvaged, but condemned.

The wreckage was sold to Birger Svendsen & Sønner of Fredrikstad on 18 February 1970 for 200,000 kr. They stripped her down and converted her to a barge and named her Anna II. She capsized again on 20 July 1972, with 450 tonnes of steel plates on board. She floated up and was later salvaged, and then renamed Sapo III.

The barge was then sold to Scan Barge AS Offshore Services of Stavanger. They sold the barge onwards to Fekete & Co AS of Tønsberg in 1980, who renamed her Balaia the following year. She was sold abroad in 1993.

== Bibliography ==
- Ryggvik, Helge; Søilen, Espen (1992). Bastøfergen: Fra damplekter til brikke i pengespillet (in Norwegian). Sandefjord: Gokstad.
