= Ferdinand Anker =

Norwegian businessperson

Ferdinand Osvald Conrad Anker (12 December 1876 – 23 April 1954) was a Norwegian businessperson.

== Pre-war career ==
Anker was born in Christiania, attended commerce school and resided in Germany and France between 1897 and 1899. In 1899 he started his own company, trading in iron, steel and other construction metals. He later expanded the company with the selling of agricultural machinery. In 1910 he abandoned the company he had started in order to take the head job of P. Schreiner sen. & Co, a company ran by his father beforehand.

Anker became a board member of Kværner Brug in 1910, and advanced to chairman in 1914. He also chaired Myrens Verksted, Moss Værft & Dokk, Landbruk Maskin (in both Oslo and Florø), A/S Staal & Jern and Jernmetal. He was a main shareholder in Landbruk Maskin, Staal & Jern and Jernmetal, and a board member of Elektrisk Bureau, supervisory council member of Nationaltheatret and Christiania Bank og Kreditkasse, and also chaired two philanthropical institutions run by his family. Heavily engaged in politics, Anker was a member of the financial committee of the Conservative Party's central board from 1909 to 1916. From 1925 he chaired the employers' association Jerngrossistenes Forening.

== Second World War and later life ==
In February 1946 Anker was arrested together with the office manager in P. Schreiner sen. & Co, on suspicion of "economic treason", as a part of the legal purge in Norway after World War II. Specific accounts were his involvement in the collection of 8000 tons of tin for Wehrmacht, stockpiling of 12,100 tons of iron for the Kriegsmarinewerft in Horten, stockpiling of iron at the grounds of his companies in Florø, Harstad and Trondheim, as well as utilization of forced labour in doing so, delivery of spikes to a Luftgau-Kommando, building of armed whaling vessels for the Kriegsmarine, "statements during the war" and collection of business orders issued by Germany while the Second World War was still ongoing in Norway.

Anker pleaded not guilty, and referred to his office manager who handled the daily affairs. He was found not guilty of the spike deliverance. In spite of this, he was found guilty of high treason, and sentenced to one year of prison and a 3 million kr fine. As of 2011, This represents about 54,4 million kr in currency (about US$10 million). In 1950 Anker was sued, as chairman of Moss Værft & Dokk, by Øivind Lorentzen's company Sobral. Sobral claimed that Moss Værft & Dokk neglected their contract agreement regarding the construction of two vessels during the war. First, claimed Sobral, Moss Værft & Dokk had instead used their capacity on arming whaling vessels. The two vessels had been delayed, and when they were completed, they had been taken over by Kriegsmarine as minesweepers. The court case lasted several years, reaching the Court of Appeal in 1954.

Anker was decorated as a Commander, Second Class of the Belgian Royal Order of the Lion before the Second World War. He died in April 1954 and was buried at Vestre gravlund.
