= MF Bastø II (1939) =

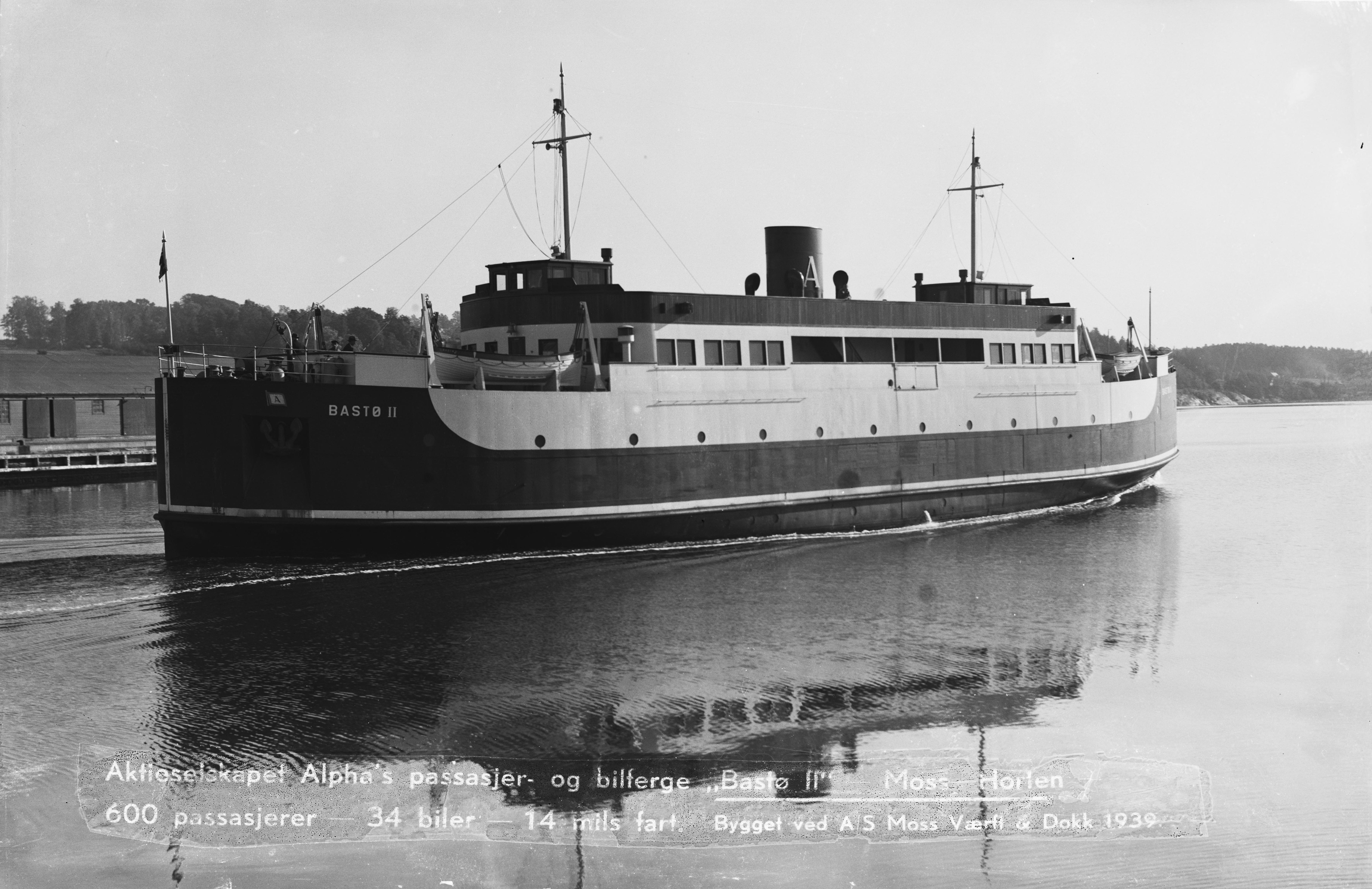
- Bastø II departs Moss

History
- Name: MF Bastø II (1939–61); MF Alpha (1961–62); MS Alandia (1962–)
- Owner: Alpha (1939–61); Rederi Ab Eckerö (1961–76)
- Operator: Alpha (1939–61); Kriegsmarine (1944–45); Rederi Ab Eckerö (1961–76)
- Port of registry: Moss (1934–52); Mariehamn (1961–76)
- Route: Moss–Horten (1939–61)
- Builder: Moss Værft & Dokk
- Cost: NOK 810.000
- Yard number: 79
- Completed: 13 July 1939
- Out of service: 1976
- Identification: IMO number: 5007912; Call sign: LKGG (1939–62), OGEI (1962–)
- Fate: Broken by 1983

General characteristics
- Type: Ferry
- Tonnage: 485 GRT / 202 NRT
- Length: 54.82 m (179.9 ft)
- Beam: 10.11 m (33.2 ft)
- Draught: 3.5 m (11 ft)
- Installed power: 662 kW (900 hp)
- Propulsion: Gebrüder Sulzer diesel engine
- Speed: 14 kn (26 km/h; 16 mph)
- Capacity: 30 cars; 600 passengers

MF Bastø II was a bidrectional roll-on/roll-off passenger and road vehicle ferry built in 1934 by Moss Værft & Dokk.

She was delivered to Alpha, who put her into service on the Moss–Horten crossing of the Oslofjord in Norway. She was requisisioned during 1944 and 1945 by the Kriegsmarine, before being returned to her owner.

She was renamed MF Alpha in 1961 and sold to the Finnish shipping company Rederi Ab Eckerö. They put her in service with Eckerö Linjen, which connected Åland to Sweden. She capsized on 4 November 1961, and was subsequently salvaged, renovated and put back into service as MF Alandia. She remained in service until 1974 and had been broken by 1983.

== Specifications ==
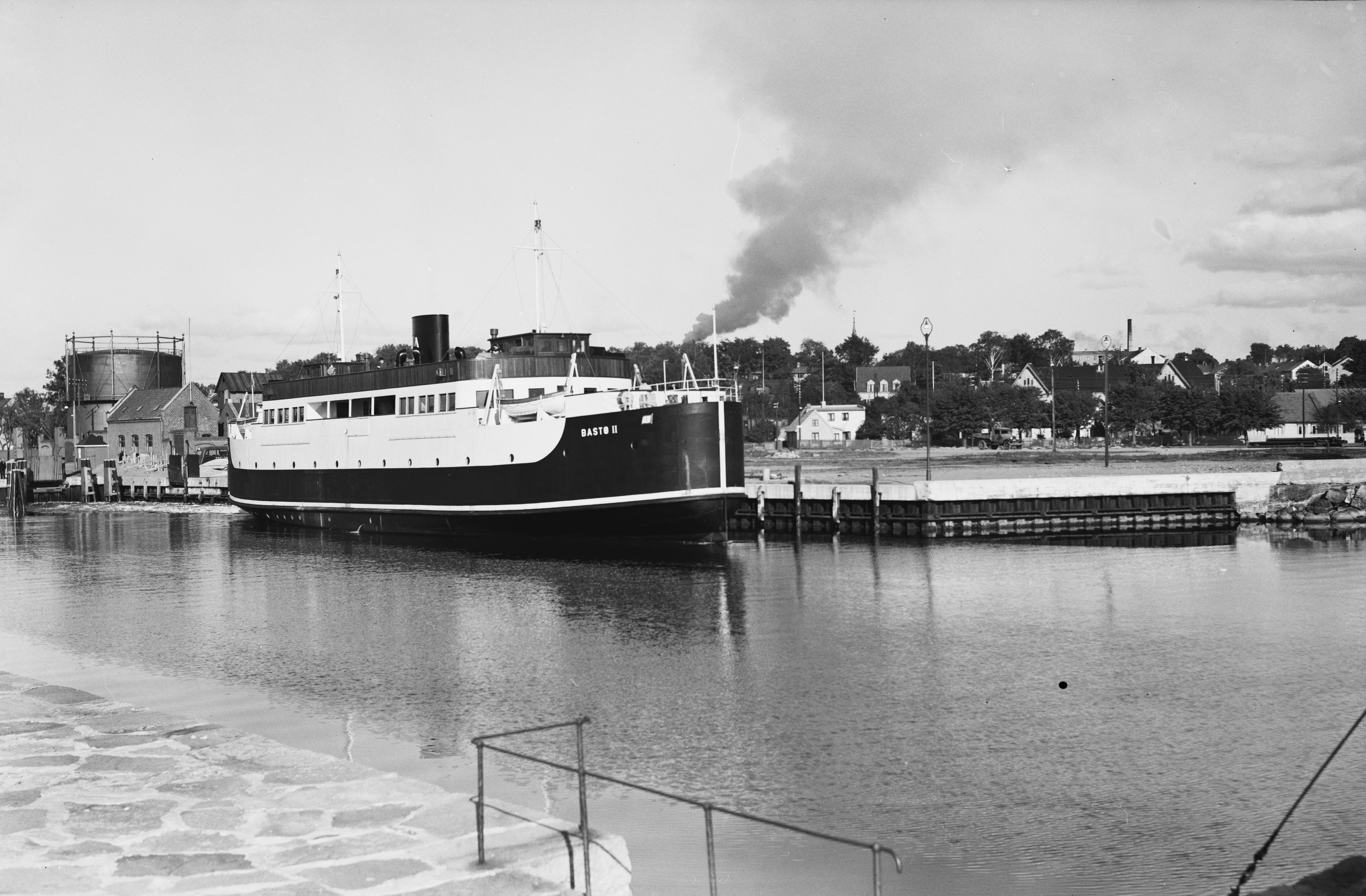
Bastø II in Moss in 1939

The ship was a steel-hull, bidirectional passenger and road vehicle ferry, with a capacity for 34 cars and 600 passengers. She had a length of 54.82 meters (179.9 ft), a beam of 10.11 meters (33.2 ft) and a draught of 3.5 meters (11 ft). This gave her a giving her a register tonnage of 484 gross and 202 net. She was powered by a Gebrüder Sulzer diesel engine with a power output of 662 kW (900 hp), giving her a cruising speed of 14 knots (26 km/h; 16 mph).

== History ==
=== Service with Alpha ===
When Alpha took delivery of SS Bastø in 1934, they ordered a ferry that in many ways was inferior to their original intentions. The Norwegian Public Roads Administration had refused to upgrade the quays in Moss and Horten, forcing Bastø to be built with a cumbersome side-loading and unloading mechanism. This led to limited capacity and high turn-around times. Car traffic boomed on the Moss–Horten route, and by 1937 it was evident that Bastø was too small for the route. By then the Public Roads Administration was willing to pay for improved quays.

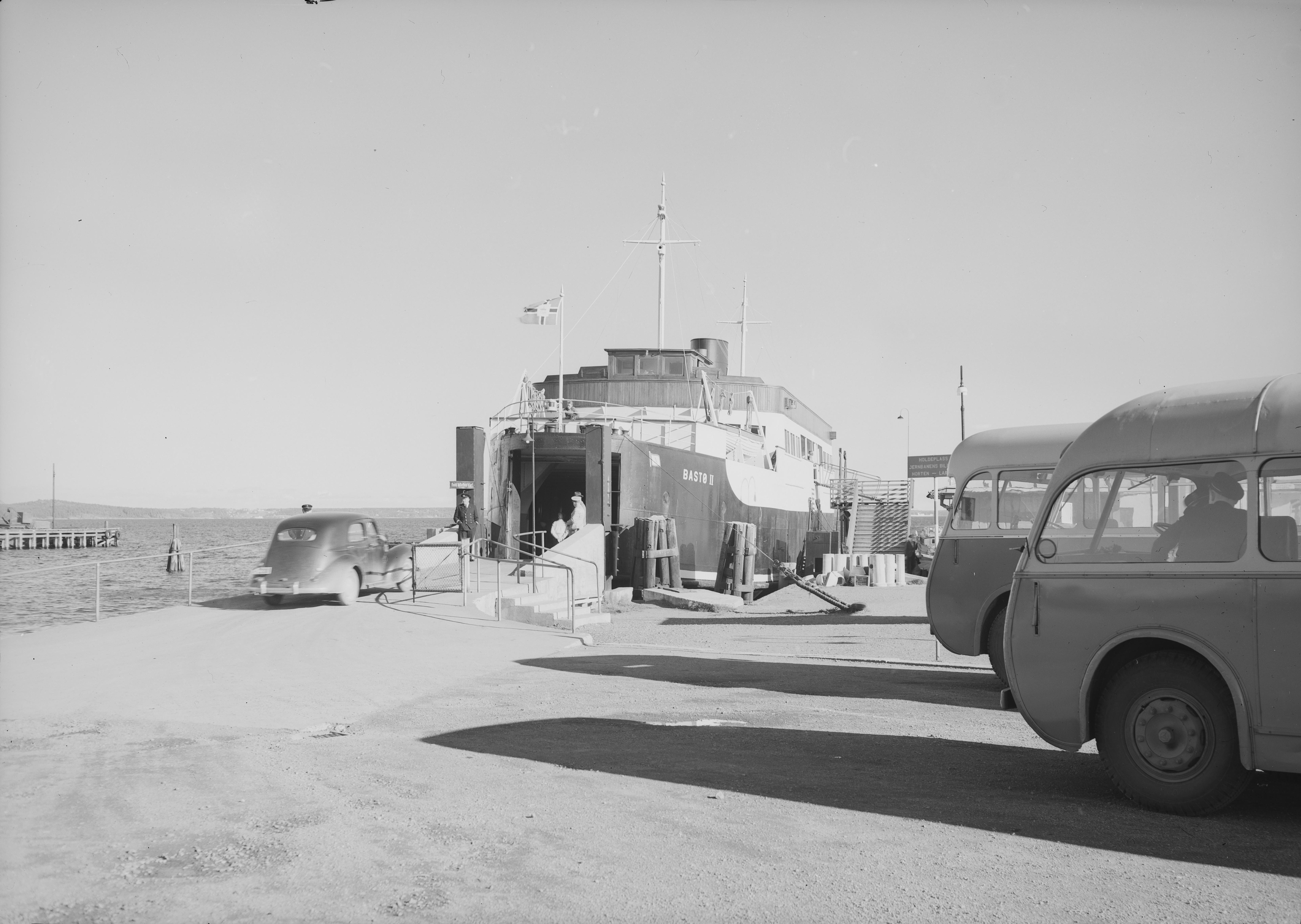
Bastø II loading vehicles in Horten in 1950

Alpha initially negotiated a deal to buy MF Djursland from Denmark, but the deal fell through as she could not be taken over before the fall of 1938. Lack of any further action led to a mounting pressure against Alpha ahead of the 1938 season. As this was a commercial route, Alpha's board was worried that with insufficient capacity, a competitor might start a competing service. A tender was issued on 28 June, and was won by Moss Værft & Dokk.

MF Bastø II was a technological leap, compared to Bastø. She was delivered with a diesel engine, instead of running on steam. She was designed with a through deck, with easy roll-on, roll-off access at both the bow and stern. A more powerful engine allowed for increased speeds, and propellers and bridges at both ends allowed easier operations, as she would not need to turn around for each crossing. Her capacity was also almost doubled.

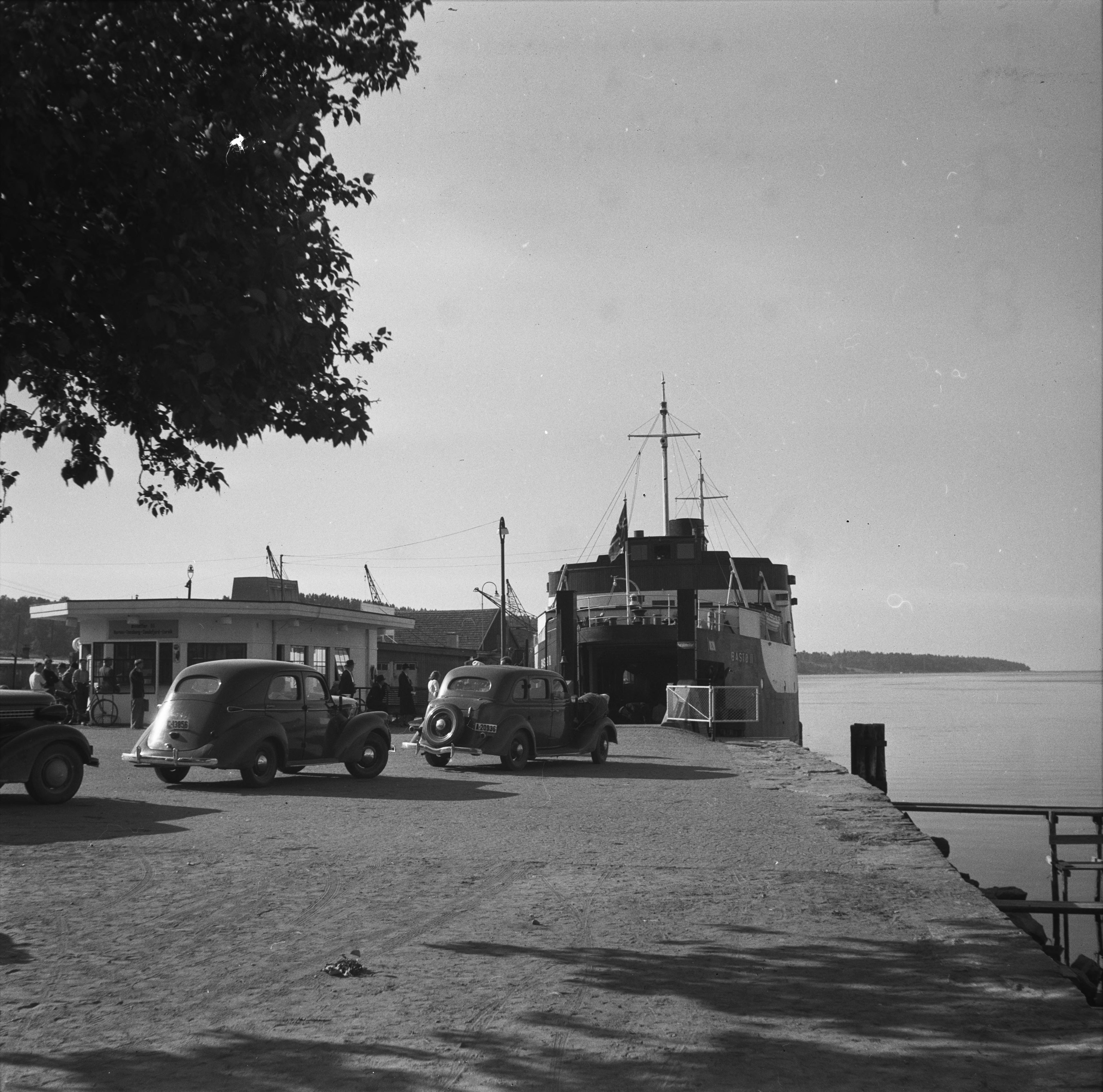
Cars driving on board Bastø II at Moss in 1937

Built at, MF Bastø II was delivered on 13 June 1939, just in time for the busy summer season. She cost 810.000 kroner. Financing became an issue. Den norske Creditbank offered a building loan, but initially refused a regular loan. Alpha attempted to get a loan in several banks, before Den norske Creditbank in 1942 converted the loan to a regular, long-term loan.

The Royal Norwegian Navy tried to lease her as a minelayer latet the same year, but Alpha refused, stating that they regarded Moss–Horten as an essential service.

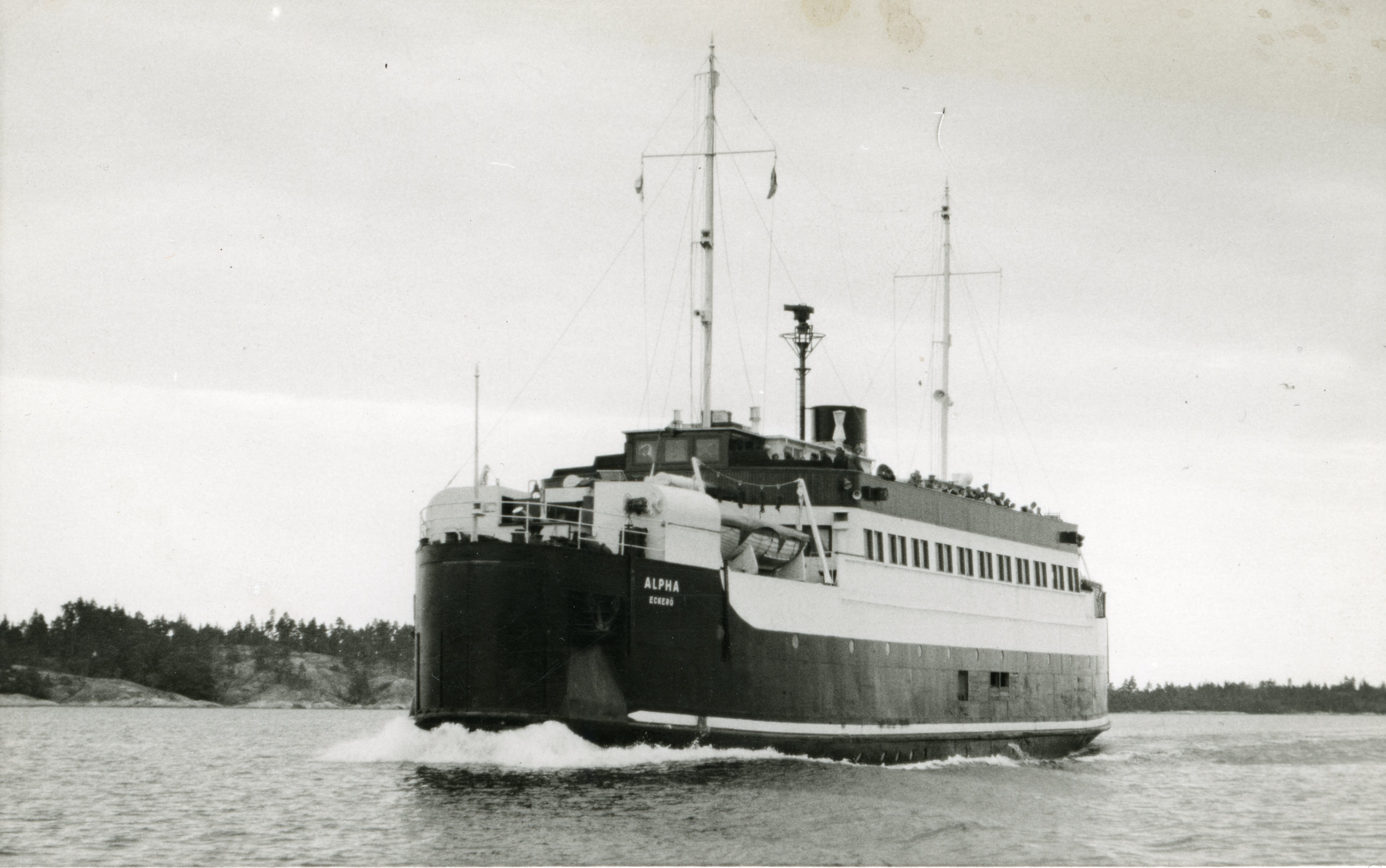
Alpha in 1961

Bastø II continued operating all day on 9 April 1940, during the German invasion of Norway, as waves of Kriegsmarine warships and flocks of Luftwaffe aircraft made their way up the Oslofjord. Norway's main navy base at Karljohansvern in Horten was under bombardment, with the Norwegian Navy returning fire. The odd minesweeper and fighter approached the ferry, but ignored her once they realized she was a civilian vessels. Traffic was heavy, as many people needed to cross the fjord. In the evening, Horten was evacuated, and many of the town's population fled with the ferry. Wharf supervisor Hansen, who let loose Bastø II's last moorings, is said to have been the only person to spend the night in town. Services were terminated the next day, but resumed on 13 April and continued in a reduced capacity until late 1944.

During the German occupation of Norway, Bastø II was kept on the Moss–Horten service, until 9 October 1944, when she was requisitioned by the Kriegsmarine. They put her into service on the Røsvik–Bonnasjøen route in Nordland. She was returned to Alpha and the Moss–Horten service on 10 June 1945.

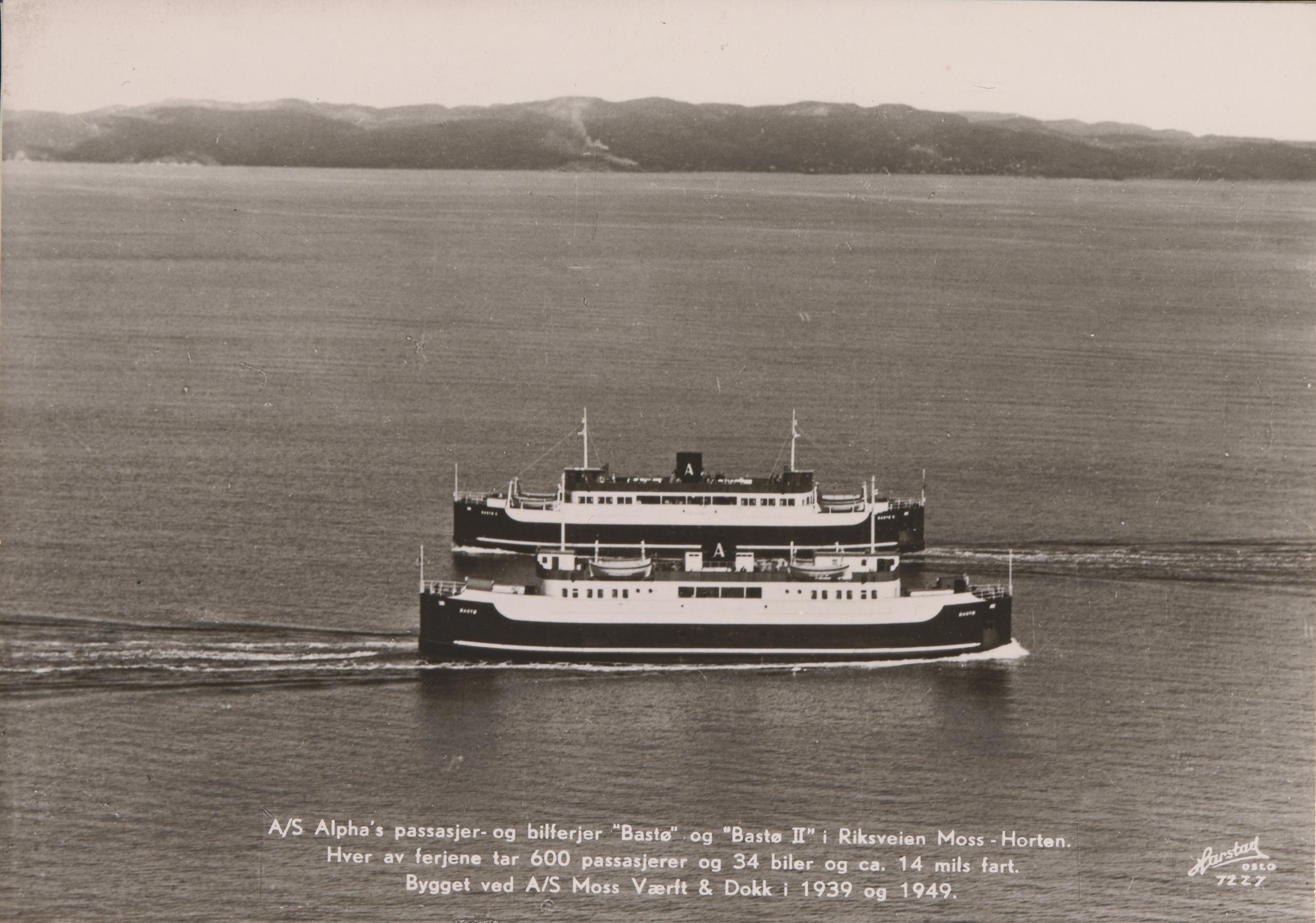
MF Bastø II (back) and her sister ship MF Bastø (1949). Although similar in design, the newer ferry has a slightly larger lounge.

Increased traffic following the end of the war led Alpha to order a sister ship; MF Bastø was delivered in 1949, and the two were used in the route. The new ship was nearly identical, with the exception of a slightly larger lounge and more efficient use of the car deck. Bastø II underwent a modernization at Moss Verft & Dokk in 1951 and 1952.

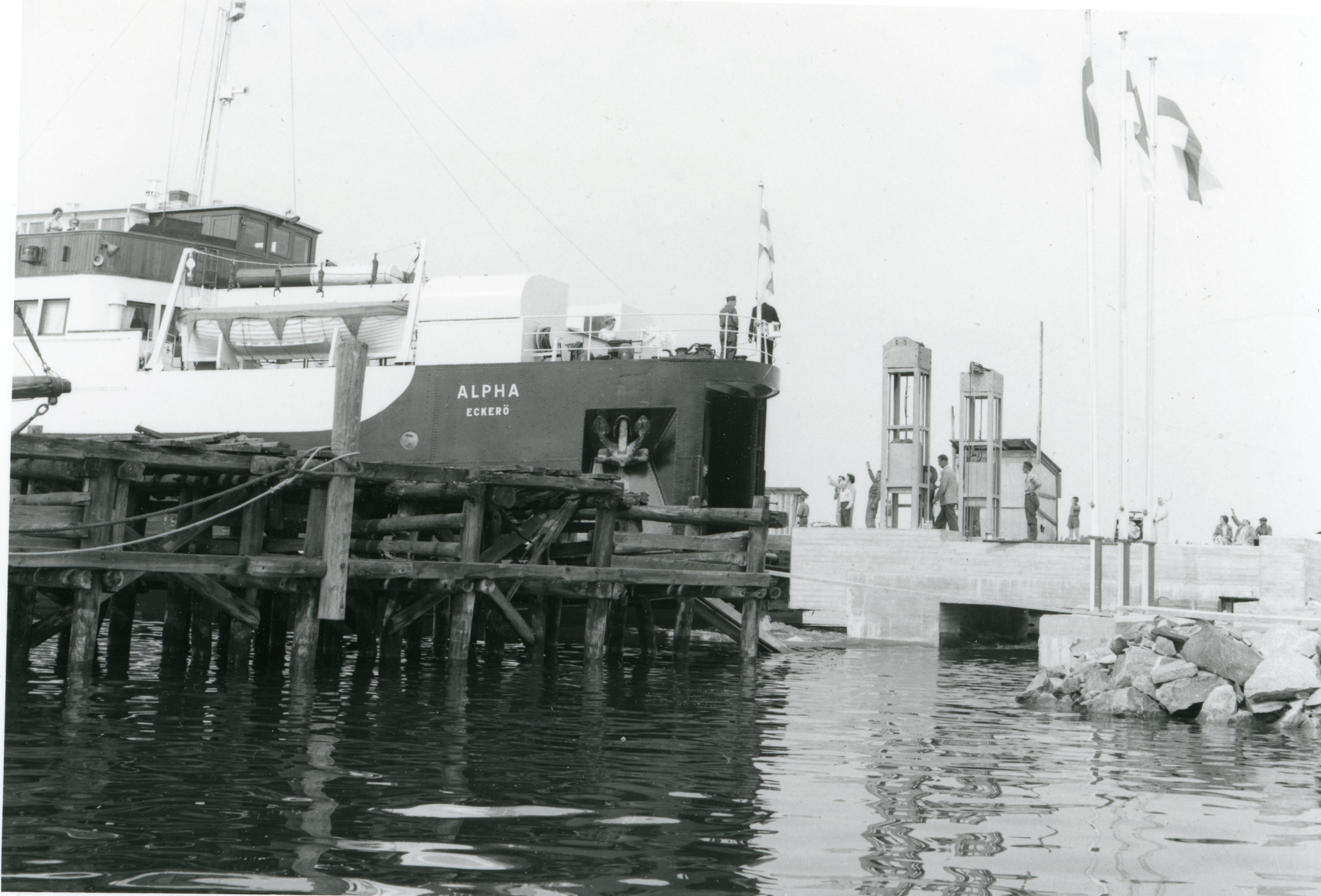
Alpha at port in Grisslehamn in 1961

A further fleet expansion began in 1956, with the delivery of what would become four sister ships, which would make Bastø II redunant. A new Bastø I was delivered in 1956 and a new Bastø II was scheduled for delivery in 1961. In order to free up the name, the old Bastø II was renamed Alpha in February 1961. Once her sister was delivered, she was put up for sale, and sold for £70,000.

=== Service with Eckerö Linjen ===
Alpha was sold on 25 April 1961 to Rederi Ab Eckerö of Åland for use in their subsidiary Eckerö Linjen, which for the most part operated ferry services between Åland and Sweden. Three days later she set course for the Baltic Sea. She was put into revenue service on 4 June on various routes: Uusikaupunki–Grisslehamn, Uusikaupunki–Mariehamn–Grisslehamn, Uusikaupunki–Öregrund, and a reserve on the route from Grisslehamn to Eckerö.

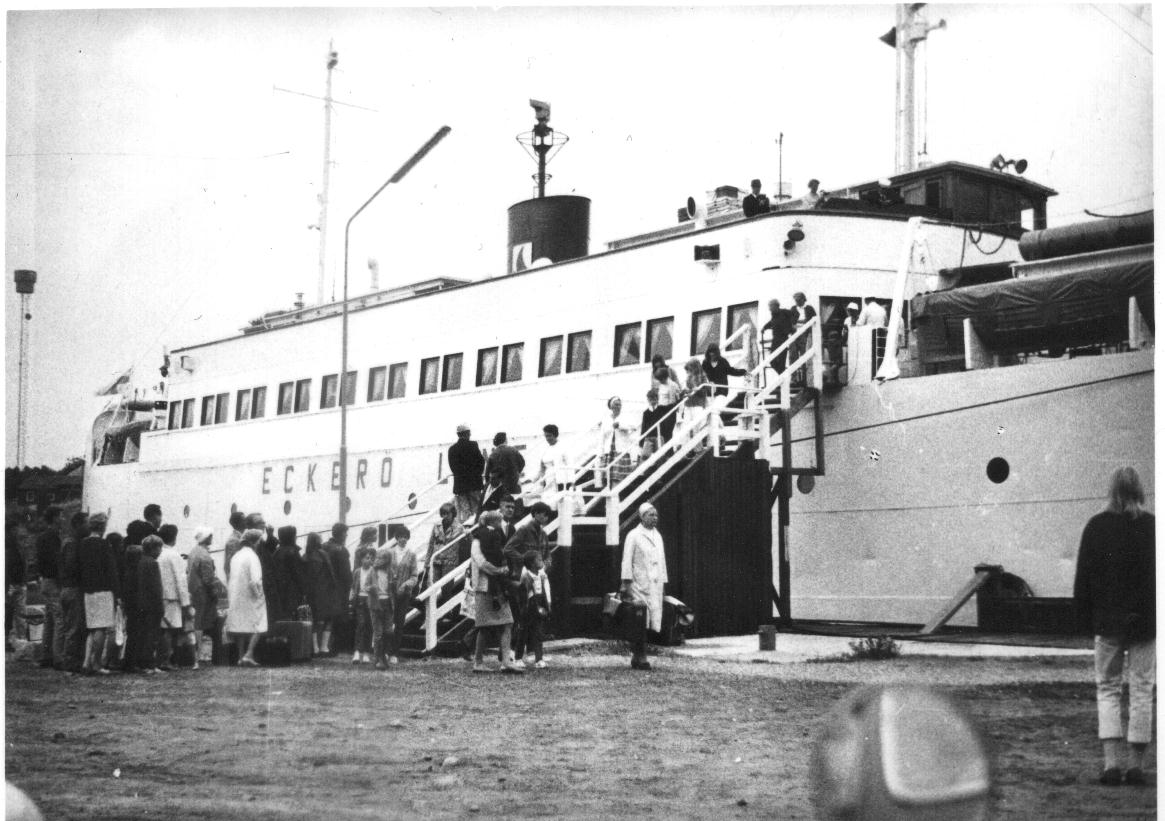
Alandia at Grisslehamn in 1967

The ship capsized on 4 November during loading. There were 46 people and five trucks on board, but no injuries. She was thereafter nicknamed "Åland Around" (Swedish: Åland runt). She was salvaged and back on her keel by 13 November. The following day she was towed to Finnboda Varv for inspection, before being sent to Oskarshamn for repair on 22 November.

She was named Alandia in April 1962 in conjunction with her repairs, and put into service again on 18 April, between Eckerö, Kapellskär and Mariehamn, where she ran for the summer season, until 2 September. From 1963, she served in a summer-only capacity on the Grissleham–Eckerö line. She received a major overhaul at Finnboda in 1968. Her least season was in 1974.

Alandia was sold for breaking in Ystad in September 1976 and towed there the same month. By 1983 she had been broken.

== Bibliography ==
- Ryggvik, Helge; Søilen, Espen (1992). Bastøfergen: Fra damplekter til brikke i pengespillet (in Norwegian). Sandefjord: Gokstad.
