= Moss Verft =

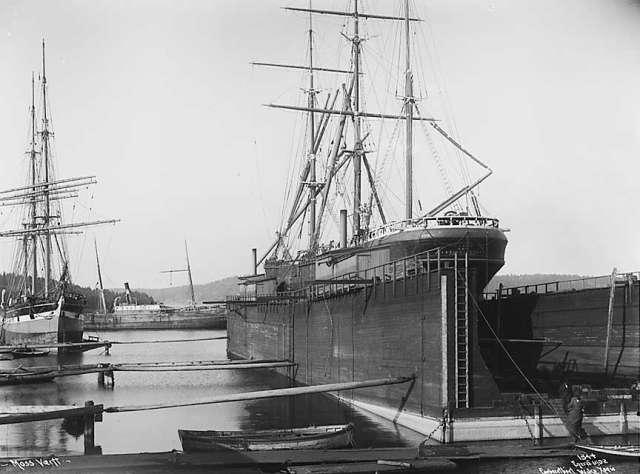
Moss Verft in 1902.

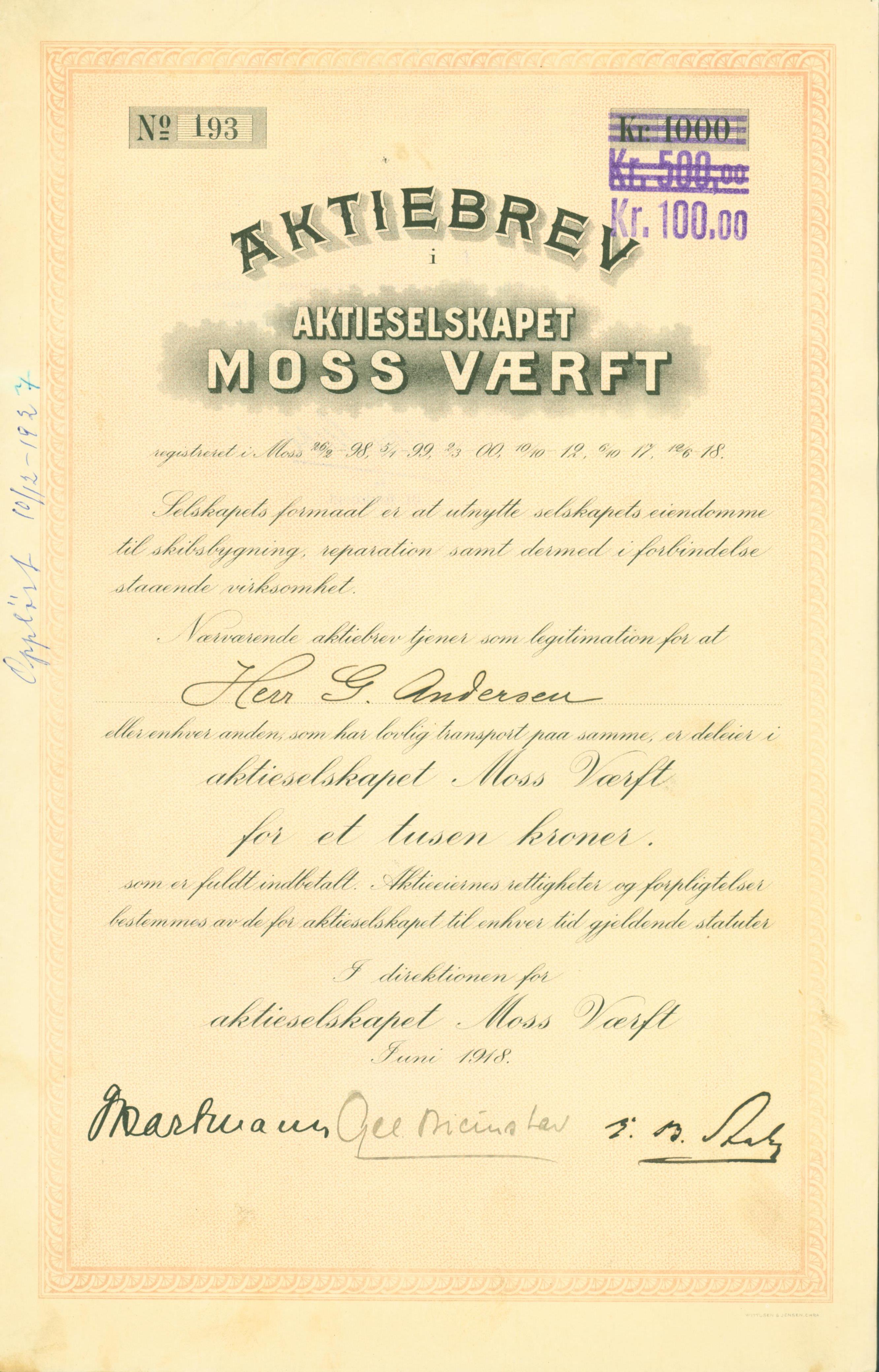
Share of the Moss Værft, issued 1 June 1918

Moss Verft was a shipyard in Jeløya, Moss, Norway. For most of its existence, it was owned by a company of the same name (with spelling variations over time in the company). Locally, it was nicknamed Værven.

== History ==
It had its predecessor in a modest reparation yard by N. W. Grønn in 1860. In 1870 it was taken over by the twins Johan and Jørgen Hermann Vogt, and in 1871 their yard had built its first vessel; a schooner. It was bought by the limited company Moss Værft in 1889. The company was dissolved in 1927 because of an economic depression, but re-founded the same year as Moss Værft & Dokk.

The first chairman of that company was Ferdinand Anker. Anker was later sentenced for economic cooperation, i.e. treason, with Germany during the occupation of Norway by Nazi Germany. Moss Værft & Dokk became implicated in these affairs, and in the 1950s, the former board as well as director Th. Ring Amundsen were sued by Øivind Lorentzen's company Sobral. Sobral claimed that Moss Værft & Dokk had prioritized work for the Wehrmacht rather than fulfilling a contract with Sobral.

In 1961 Moss Værft & Dokk was acquired by major corporation Kværner Brug. After Kværner bought Rosenberg Verft as well, in 1970, the companies were amalgamated into Moss-Rosenberg Verft. The shipyard in Moss was the city's largest place of work in the 1970s, but it was discontinued in 1987. The last vessel produced by the yard was a railway ferry for Statens Järnvägar in 1986.
