= Skaugen =

Skaugen is a surname. Notable people with the surname include:

- Brynjulf Skaugen, Sr. (1918–2002), Norwegian businessman
- Grace Reksten Skaugen (born 1953), Norwegian business executive
- Isak Martinius Skaugen (1875–1962), Norwegian businessman
- Morits Skaugen (1920–2005), Norwegian yacht racer and businessman
- Morits Skaugen, Jr. (born 1955), Norwegian businessman

== See also ==
- I. M. Skaugen, a Norwegian shipping company
