= Gokstad (company) =

Norwegian shipping company

Gokstad AS
- Type: Private
- Industry: Shipping
- Defunct: December 31, 1995
- Fate: Dissolved
- Headquarters: Horten, Norway
- Area served: Oslofjord
- Products: Moss–Horten Ferry
- Owner: Bjørn Bettum

Gokstad AS was a shipping company which operated the Moss–Horten Ferry across the Oslofjord between 1989 and 1995. The company was owned by Bjørn Bettum and based in Horten, Norway.

While Kosmos was being taken over in 1988, Kosmos-CEO Bettum secured a management buyout of the cross-fjord ferry division through his family company Gokstad. Effective 1 January 1989, Gokstad took over two ferries, Bastø I and Bastø II (later Østfold) along with the route operations. Bastø I was sold after being replaced by the brand-new Vestfold in 1991. Gokstad lost its concession from 1 January 1996 to Bastø Fosen, after which it ceased operations. It remained a holding company for the ferries until 1999.

== History ==
Bjørn Bettum was appointed CEO of Kosmos in 1978. Kosmos was under his management transformed from a pure shipping company to a conglomerate, which included buying Alpha in 1984 and thus gaining control of the Moss–Horten Ferry. The ferry operatios were integrated into Kosmos as a division.

Kosmos was subject to a leveraged buyout by the shipping company I. M. Skaugen in late 1988, and forst to leave his position. The new owners had primarily bought the company in order to liquidate its diversified portfolio. Bettum wanted to secure control part of the Kosmos empire. Using his private company Gokstad AS, he partnered up with Chemical Bank in order to secure a management buy-out of one division. He had originally eyed the tanker fleet, but was turned down. He then shifted focus to local operations in Vestfold.

A deal was reached for the purchase of the Oslofjord ferry operations, including the two ferries Bastø I and Bastø II, Kosmos Catering AS, operator of the ferries' cafés, and Ranvik Verksted.The deal was effective on 1 January 1989.

=== Establishment ===
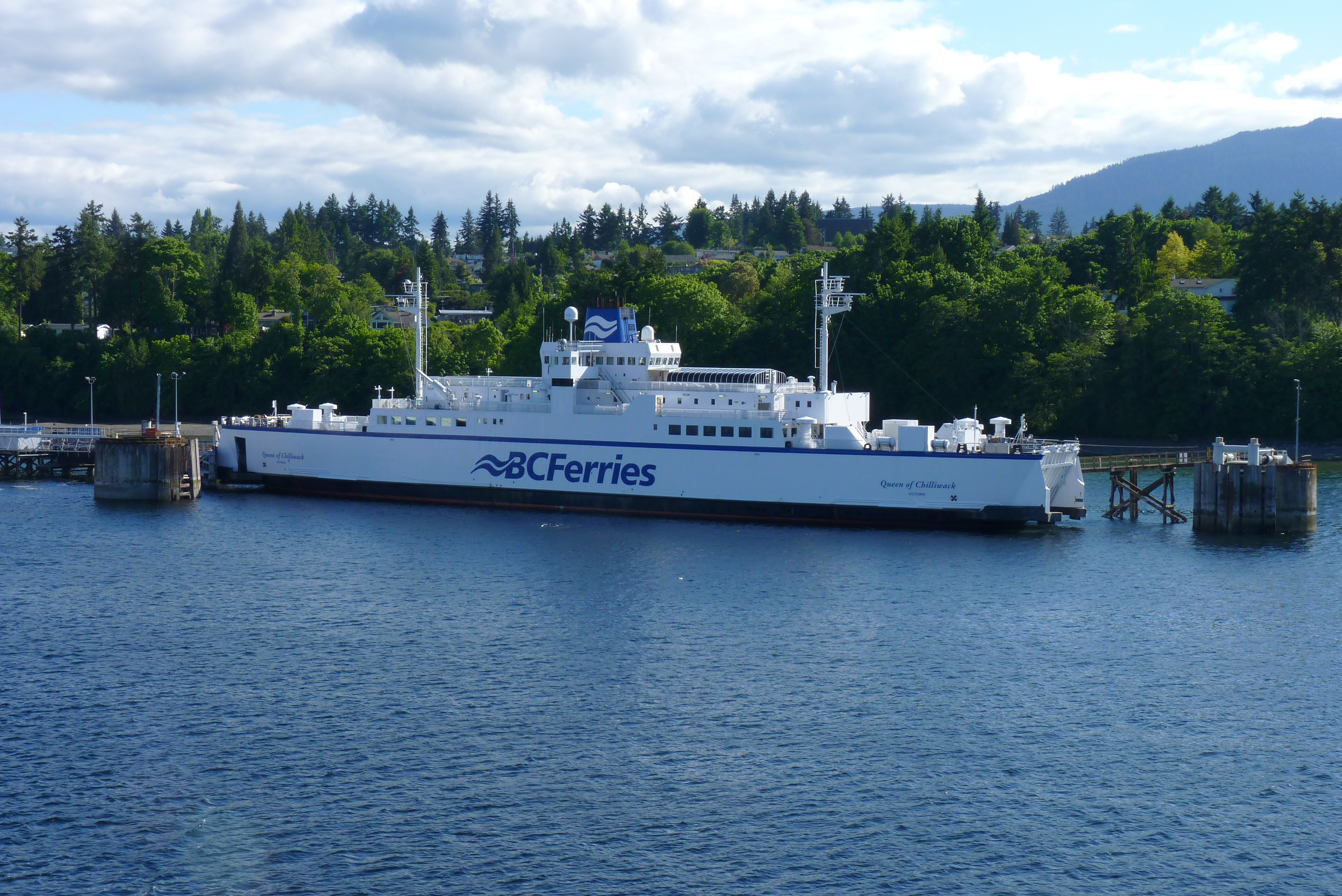
Gokstad took over Bastø I from Kosmos, but sold her BC Ferries in 1991, where she served as Queen of Chilliwack

The Moss–Horten Ferry was a quite profitable venture. It held a legal monopoly on the route, based on a concession issued by the Ministry of Transport. The concession held clauses limiting the fees which the ferry operator could charge, yet they were able to get a thirty percent operating margin. The value of the company therefore mostly lay in the ability to generate this profit stream, more than the underlying value of the ships and other assets.

The change of ownership meant that the concession had to be renewed. This resulted in a competing partnership, consisting of Torghatten Trafikkselskap and Fosen Trafikklag, handling in an application for the route. Gokstad's concession was renewed on 21 July, while the competing concession was rejected oon 28 July. The awardec concession lasted until 31 December 1995 The new concession limited the ticket prices, but retained the Gokstad's right to make a "reasonable profil".

=== Fleet renewal ===
Alpha had been a Moss-based company, and with a strong identity tied to the city. Both Bettum and Kosmos were based in Sandefjord, giving them a stronger tie to Vestfold. During the Kosmos period, operational headquarters had remained in Moss, but from 1991, head office moved across the fjord to Værlebrygga in Horten.

Alpha and Kosmos had traditionally offered a free pas on the ferry to a large number of prominent people in politics, businesspeople and transport buraucrats. The benefits were increasingly being recognized as corruption. More and more people returned the free passes, and the system was abolished in 1990.

A contributing factor to the Fosen–Torghatten initiative, was increasing discontent with high prices and long waiting times, especially during the summer. Gokstad looked into the possibility of extending the two ferries, but instead opted to order a newbuid. MF Vestfold was delivewred in April 1991, with a capacity for 250 cars and 700 passengers, able to cruise at 15 knots (28 km/h; 17 mph). Bastø II was renamed MF Østfold on 1 July 1991, after going through a modernization. Bastø I was sold to BC Ferries in Canada.

Vestfold had two stories with car deck. This allowed for later loading and unloading, but required large re-works of the docks at both Moss and Horten.

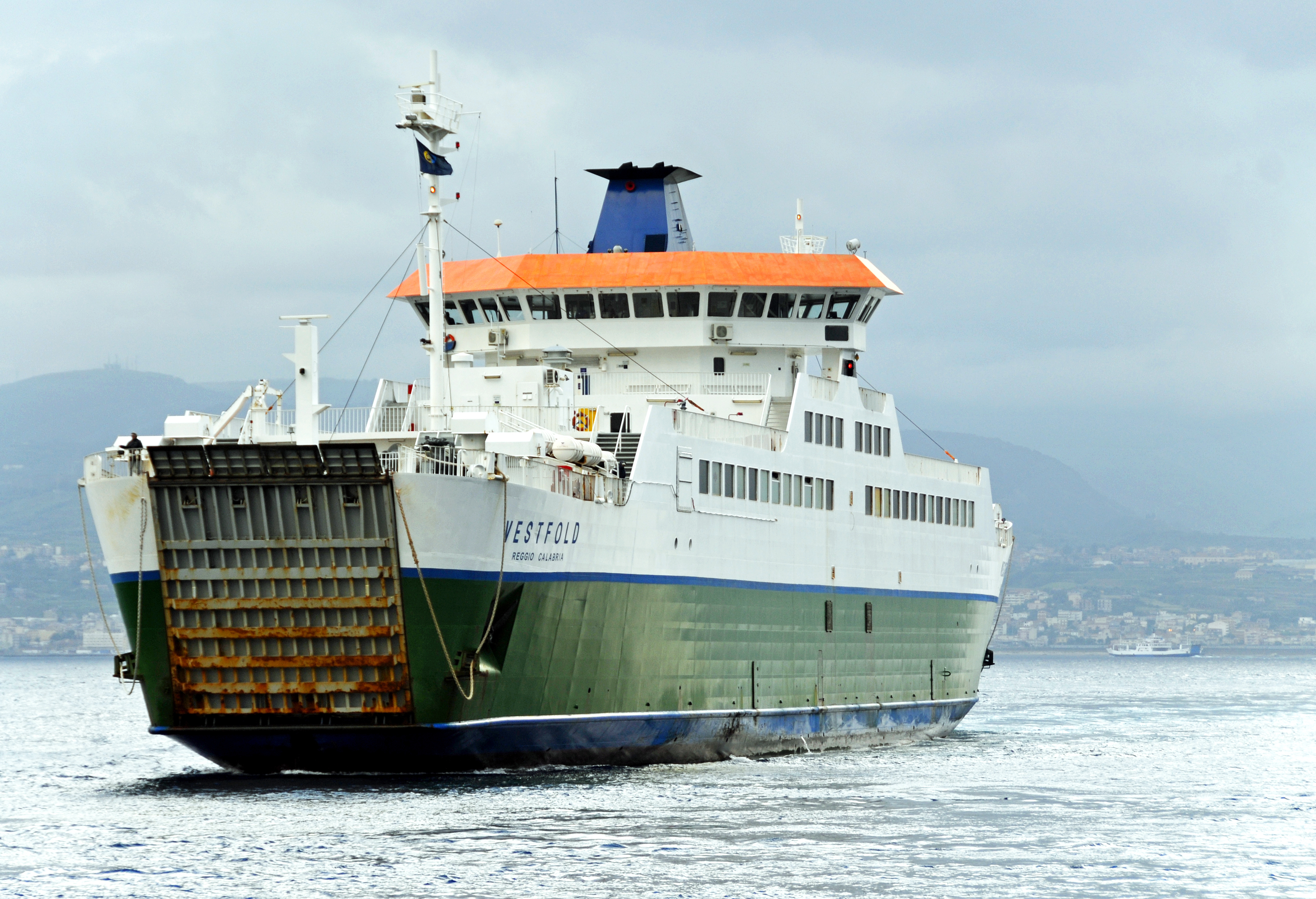
Vestfold was eventually sold to Italy, where she retained the name Vestfold

=== Loss of concession ===
When the concession was up for renewal, for the period from 1996 to 2005, both Gokstad and Fosen Trafikklag put in a bid. This time the authorities preferred the bid from Fosen, who was awarded the ten-year concession on 12 September 1995. The main argument was that Fosen would be able to operate for 100 million kroner lower fares for the ten-year period. Gokstad complained, but this was rejected. They then sued to the government, but lost.

Services from Moss to Horten were taken over by Fosen's newly established subsidiary Bastø Fosen on 1 January 1996. Due to the short deadline from concession to start-up, Fosen was forced to lease vessels until new ships were built. They proposed leasing Gokstad's two ships, but could not reach an agreement. In the end, Vestfold and Østfold were used from 1 to 12 January under Fosen's flag.

Vestfold was instead leased to Rogaland Trafikkselskap for use on the Stavanger–Tau service. Gokstad retained ownership until 1998, when Rogaland Trafikkselskap bought her. A buyer could initially not be found for Østfold, and she was docked at Moss without revenue use until 1999. She was eventually sold to Viano Shipping, who used her on a service on the Strait of Messina. Viano would later also buy Vestfold, and kept the names for both ships.

== Fleet ==
List of ships operating by Gokstad
Name	Built	Shipyard	Cars	Pax	Start	End
Bastø I	1978	Framnæs Mekaniske Værksted	190	700	1989	1991
Østfold	1979	Moss Rosenberg Verft	190	700	1989	1995
Vestfold	1991	Trønderverftet	250	750	1991	1995

== Bibliography ==
- Boye, Tore (2005). Anders Jahres pengebinge (in Norwegian). Baltic Business Development. ISBN 82-996932-0-9.
- Hansen, Finn R. (2001). Selskapet og dets fartøyer: Fosen Trafikklag ASA (in Norwegian).
- Ryggvik, Helge; Søilen, Espen (1992). Bastøfergen: Fra damplekter til brikke i pengespillet (in Norwegian). Sandefjord: Gokstad.
