= Queen of Chilliwack =

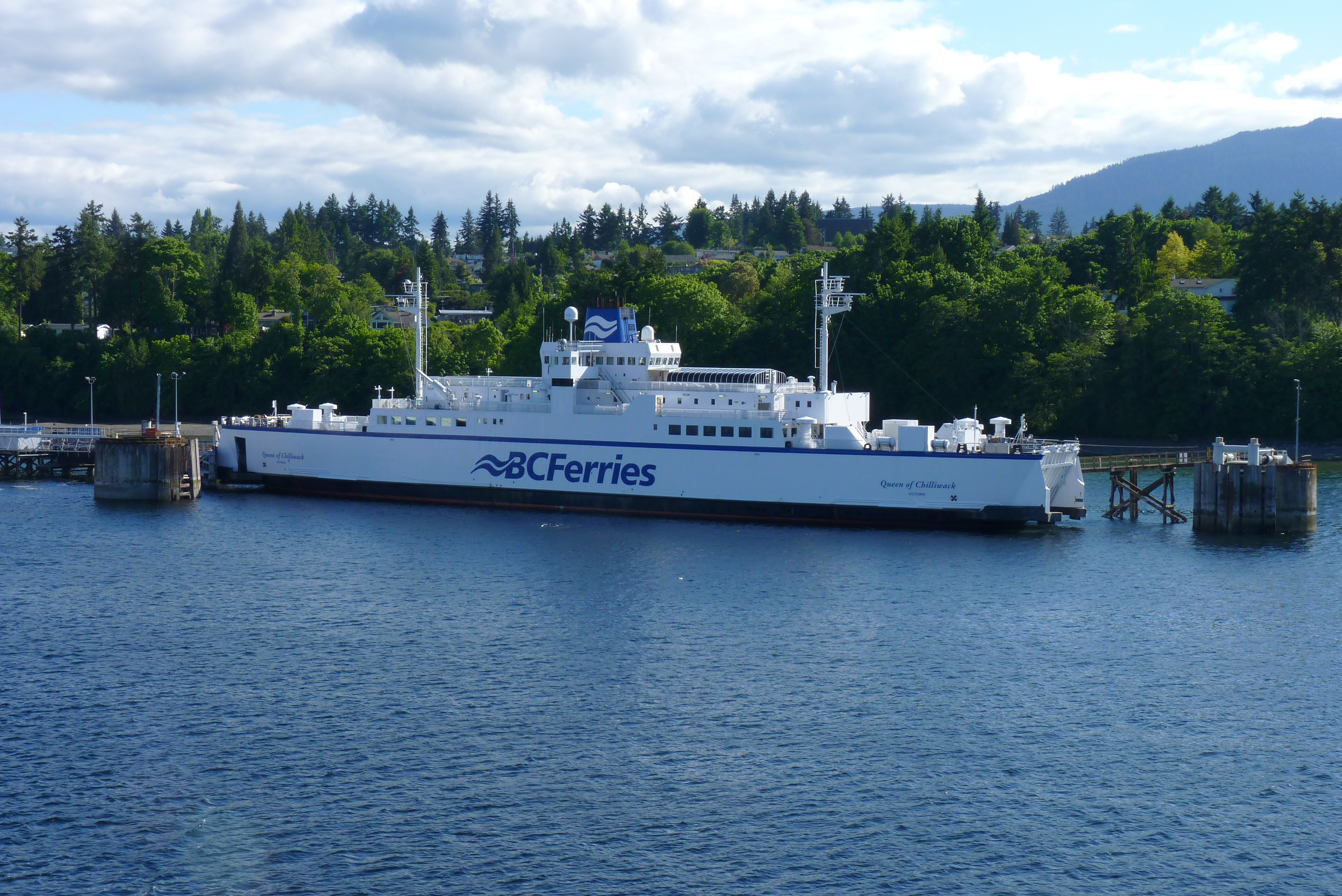
- Queen of Chilliwack at Departure Bay on June 3, 2011

History

Norway
- Name: Bastø I
- Owner: Alpha, Kosmos, Gokstad
- Operator: Alpha, Kosmos, Gokstad
- Route: Moss–Horten Ferry
- Builder: Framnæs Mekaniske Værksted
- Yard number: 190
- Completed: 1978
- Identification: IMO number: 7700415; Call sign: LGZT
- Fate: sold to BC Ferries in 1991

Canada
- Name: Queen of Chilliwack
- Namesake: Chilliwack, British Columbia
- Owner: British Columbia Ferry Services Inc.
- Operator: British Columbia Ferry Services Inc.
- Acquired: 1991
- Identification: IMO number: 7700415
- Fate: sold to Goundar Shipping in 2015

Fiji
- Name: Lomaiviti Princess III
- Owner: Goundar Shipping
- Operator: Goundar Shipping
- Acquired: 2015
- Identification: IMO number: 7700415; MMSI number: 520287000; Callsign: 3DSA
- Fate: sold for demolition at Alang in 2024
- Status: Demolished

General characteristics
- Class & type: unclassified
- Type: ferry
- Displacement: 3447
- Length: 114.58 m
- Installed power: 5,880 hp (4,380 kW)
- Speed: 12.5 knots (23.2 km/h)
- Capacity: 400 passengers and crew; 115 cars

Queen of Chilliwack was a roll-on/roll-off passenger and road vehicle ferry built in 1978 by Framnæs Mekaniske Værksted in Sandefjord, Norway, along with her twin, MF Bastø II.

The vessel was delivered as MF Bastø I to Norwegian ferry operator Alpha, who put her into service on the Moss–Horten Ferry crossing of the Oslofjord. Ownership, along with the operation of the route, passed to Kosmos in 1984 and Gokstad in 1989. She was replaced by the larger MF Vestfold in 1991.

BC Ferries of Canada bought her, renaming her Queen of Chilliwack. After a retrofit, she was put into service on the Tsawwassen – Southern Gulf Islands route in the Gulf of Georgia. She was later moved to Earls Cove – Saltery Bay. After another retrofit, in 1996, BC Ferries moved her to the Discovery Coast Passage through Queen Charlotte Sound.

The ship was sold to Fiji operator Goundar Shipping in 2015, who named her Lomaiviti Princess 3. She was sold for demolition at Alang in 2024.

== History ==
=== Service on the Oslofjord ===
Alpha, the operator of the Moss–Horten Ferry, had since the 1960s had a system with four smaller ferries operating the route during summer, and two during winter. Traffic continued to increase through the 1960s and 1970s, so Alpha needed to expand its capacity. It decided to only order two ferries, but have two which were much larger. These would the same crew each as the smaller vessels, and have much better fuel efficiency. Two ships were ordered, MF Bastø II and MF Bastø II. Bastø I was built at Framnæs Mekaniske Værksted and delivered to Alpha on 6 June 1978, a year before her sister.

The new ferries were quite profitable for Alpha, allowing the operator to turn a profit throughout the 1980s. They severely reduced operating costs due to lower maintenance, lower fuel consumption, fewer staff. The thrusters allowed for faster docking, and the gates were wide enough to load and unload vehicles in two files. The latter meant that their turn-around time about the same, despite increasing the car capacity from 55 to 190 vehicles. However, this was only possible to major upgrades to the ferry quays.

Alpha merged into Kosmos in 1984, giving the ship a new owner and operator. Kosmos sold the Moss–Horten operations to Gokstad in 1989, who took over operations and ownership of Bastø I. Although traffic on the route was stable in the early 1980s, by the time Gokstad had taken over, traffic numbers were again increasing, especially during summer. Its owner, Bjørn Bettum, was worried he would lose the concession on the route if queues continued to mount at the ferry queys. Extension of the two ferries was considered. Instead, Gokstad opted to order a larger newbuild. MF Vestfold was delivered in April 1991, with a capacity for 250 cars. Bastø II was renamed MF Østfold on 1 July 1991, after going through a modernization. Bastø I became redundant and was put up for sale.

=== Service in British Columbia ===
In 1991 Bastø I was bought by BC Ferries. She had to travel 35 days on the trip to British Columbia from Norway, via the Panama Canal. When the vessel arrived she first went to Point Hope Shipyard for a major overhaul for the Tsawwassen - Southern Gulf Islands ferry route in the Gulf of Georgia. She was then named Queen of Chilliwack. She later changed to the Earls Cove – Saltery Bay route.

In 1996 Queen of Chilliwack was taken out of service for another overhaul, this time the ferry was assigned to the new mid-coast route called the Discovery Coast Passage which goes through Queen Charlotte Sound. Queen of Chilliwack would first start from Port Hardy and begin her journey up to the small First Nations communities of Namu, Bella Bella, Shearwater, Ocean Falls, and Bella Coola. In the winter prior to 2009, Queen of Chilliwack maintained the Earls Cove - Saltery Bay route. While the MV Northern Expedition handles the Port Hardy to Prince Rupert route. As of 2009 she had been replaced by the Malaspina Sky on the Earls Cove – Saltery Bay route.

=== Service in Fiji ===
In 2015 "Queen of Chilliwack" was sold to Goundar Shipping of Fiji for $1.8 million. She was sold for demolition at Alang in 2024.

== Bibliography ==
- Ryggvik, Helge; Søilen, Espen (1992). Bastøfergen: Fra damplekter til brikke i pengespillet (in Norwegian). Sandefjord: Gokstad.
