= Moss–Horten Ferry =

Ferry route in Norway

Coordinates: 59.4111°N 10.5833°E

Moss–Horten Ferry Bastø Ferry
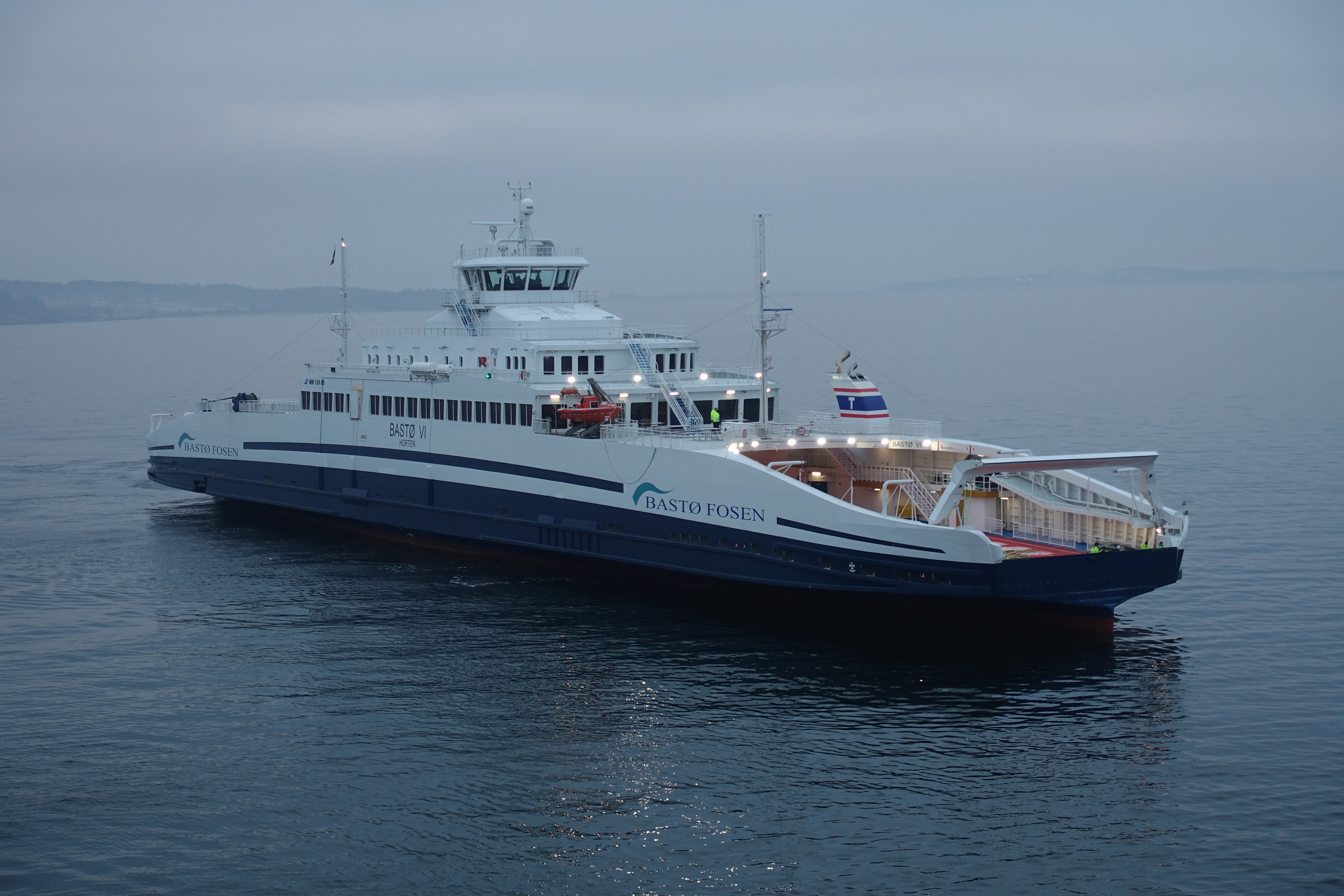
- MF Bastø VI
- Waterway: Oslofjord
- Transit type: Double-ended
- Route: Norwegian National Road 19
- Carries: Automobiles and passengers
- Terminals: Moss; Horten
- Operator: Torghatten Sør
- Authority: Norwegian Public Roads Administration
- Began operation: 1884
- System length: 10.5 kilometres (6.5 mi)
- Travel time: 35 min
- Headway: 15–20 min
- No. of vessels: 6
- Daily ridership: 3720 (2008)
- Daily vehicles: 4086 (2008)
- Website: torghatten.no

The Moss–Horten Ferry (Norwegian: Ferjesambandet Moss–Horten, colloquially known as the Bastø Ferry or Bastøfergen), is a passenger and road vehicle ferry which crosses the Oslofjord between the towns of Moss and Horten in Norway. It carries National Road 19 and acts as the main connection between Østfold and Vestfold.

The service is provided by ferries operated by Torghatten Sør, who make the 10.5-kilometer (6.5 mi) in 30 minutes. It is the busiest road ferry in Norway. In 2008 the line had a daily ridership of 3720 people and 4086 vehicles. It is the most trafficked car ferry line in Norway.

== History ==
=== Early ferrying ===
The strait between Jeløya and Horten is the narrowest part of the outer Oslofjord, and has therefore been a natural place to row over the fjord since time immemorial. The oldest documented ferry crossing took place in 1582, by which time ferry crossings were normal. On the Moss side, Tronvik was the normal harbor.

King Frederik IV instructed the magistrate in Borre to build a larger ferry, for 16 horses and 50 people. A ferry privilege from 1752 specified that the ferry had to have capacity for 6 horses, a smaller vessel for 12 passengers and a boat suitable for one or two passengers. The fees in 1784 were set to 40 schillings during summer and 60 during winter. These fees were increased in 1803, again in 1811 and was from then on regularly regulated. The rights to run the ferry were tied to the ownership of the farm at Tronvik.

The ferry sank in February 1854, killing both rowers and two passengers. Then owner of the farm, David Crystie, resigned the ferry rights the following year. Moss Municipality and Smaalenene County took initiative to move the ferry quay into town, and struck a deal to rent Melløsbryggen. Agreements were made with various boat-owners to row or sail passengers across the fjord. This lasted for a few years. Meanwhile steamships started to travel along the fjord, often making a crossing or two. The boat-owners terminated their contracts, and the whole service was terminated.

The Østfold Line opened in 1879 and the Vestfold Line, with the branch Horten Line, opened two years later. This reinvigorated the ferry question. Both Moss Station and Horten Station were located a small stroll from the towns' quays. Local authorities encouraged the railway to operate such a crossing, but they were not interested.

=== Moss–Horten Dampskibsselskab ===
Richard Peterson establish Moss–Horten Dampskibsselskab in 1884 in order to start a cross-fjord service. He started the route with SS Axel, but immediately ordered a new, larger vessel, SS Bastø, delivered in 1885. A year later the company bought Horten as a spare vessel. The largest challenge for Peterson was to get his routes coordinated with the railway. They saw the ferry service as a competitor, and refused to align the train times to the ferry's arrival and departure times.

Peterson bought the larger ferry SS Bastø II in 1900. It could carry 260 passengers and, at least in theory, could hoist two cars into its hold. By 1911, Peterson was growing old, and wanted to retire from the shipping business. He therefore sold his steamship company to Alpha, the other major shipping company based in Moss, who took over among other routes the Moss–Horten Ferry in December 1910.

=== Alpha takes over ===
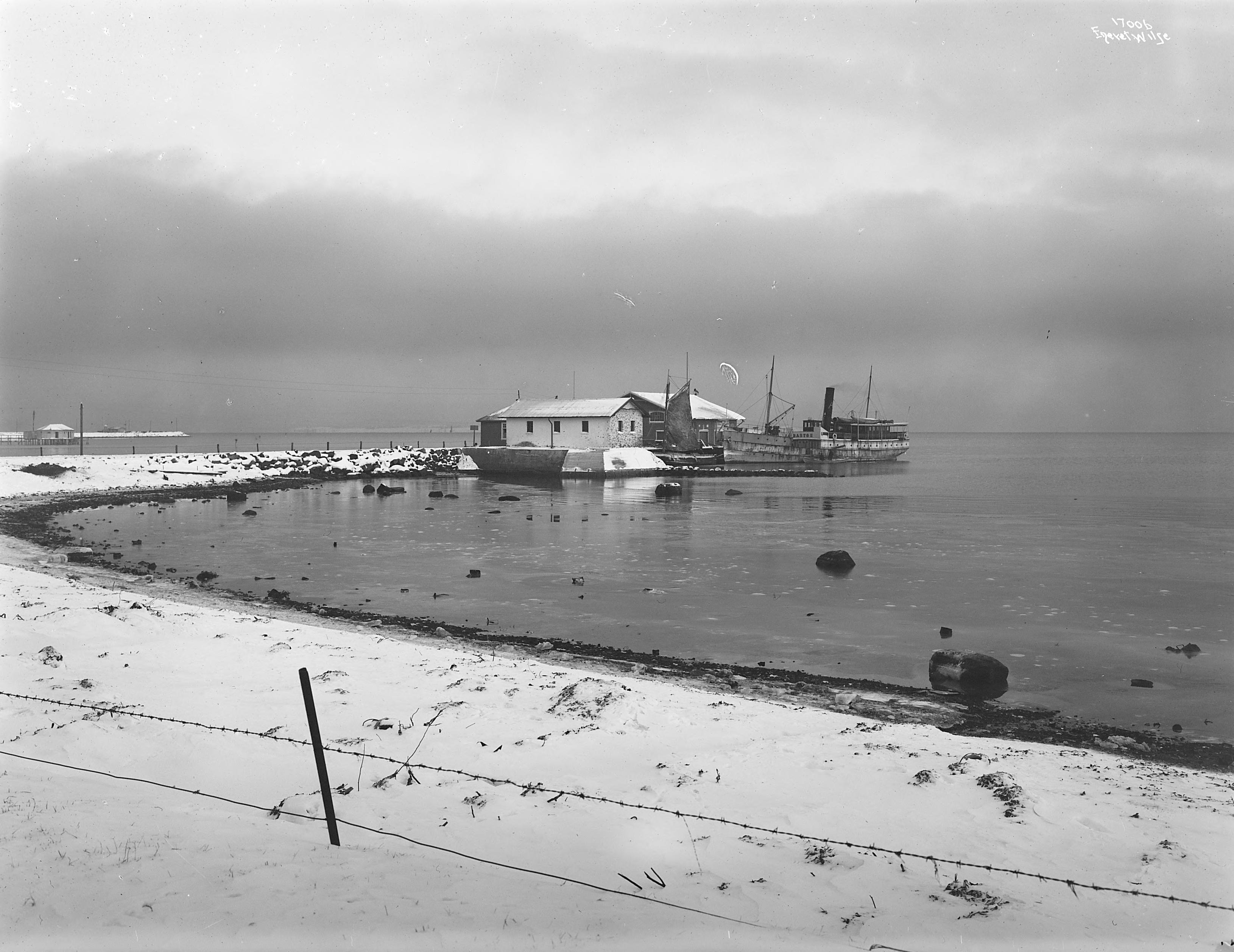
SS Bastø II at Horten in 1915

Alpha was predominantly owned by people in Moss. Although it was in high esteem there, there was more discontent in Horten and Vestfold. A self-organized "ferry committee" was established in Vestfold in 1928, and attempted at establishing a competing company. Their calculations were dependent on building a railway ferry, for which they needed the Vestfold Line to undergo gauge conversion. In the end, nothing came of the proposal.

Bastø (1934) was delivered on 1 June 1934. Built by Moss Værft & Dokk, she had a capacity for 18 cars and 400 passengers. Ideally the company wanted a roll-on/roll-off (ro-ro) ferry, which could be loaded from the ship's bow and stern, but instead they were driven on and off via a side ramp. The quays on both sides were upgraded for the new ferry, but neither municipality could afford the docks Alpha wanted. Bastø was put into seven daily round-trip crossings, with an extra daily service in July and August.

When Damm launched the Norwegian edition of the board game Monopoly in 1937, the Bastø Ferry was included as one of four shipping companies, replacing the original railway stations. The other three were the Norwegian America Line, the Bergen Steamship Company and, in a twist of fate, Kosmos.

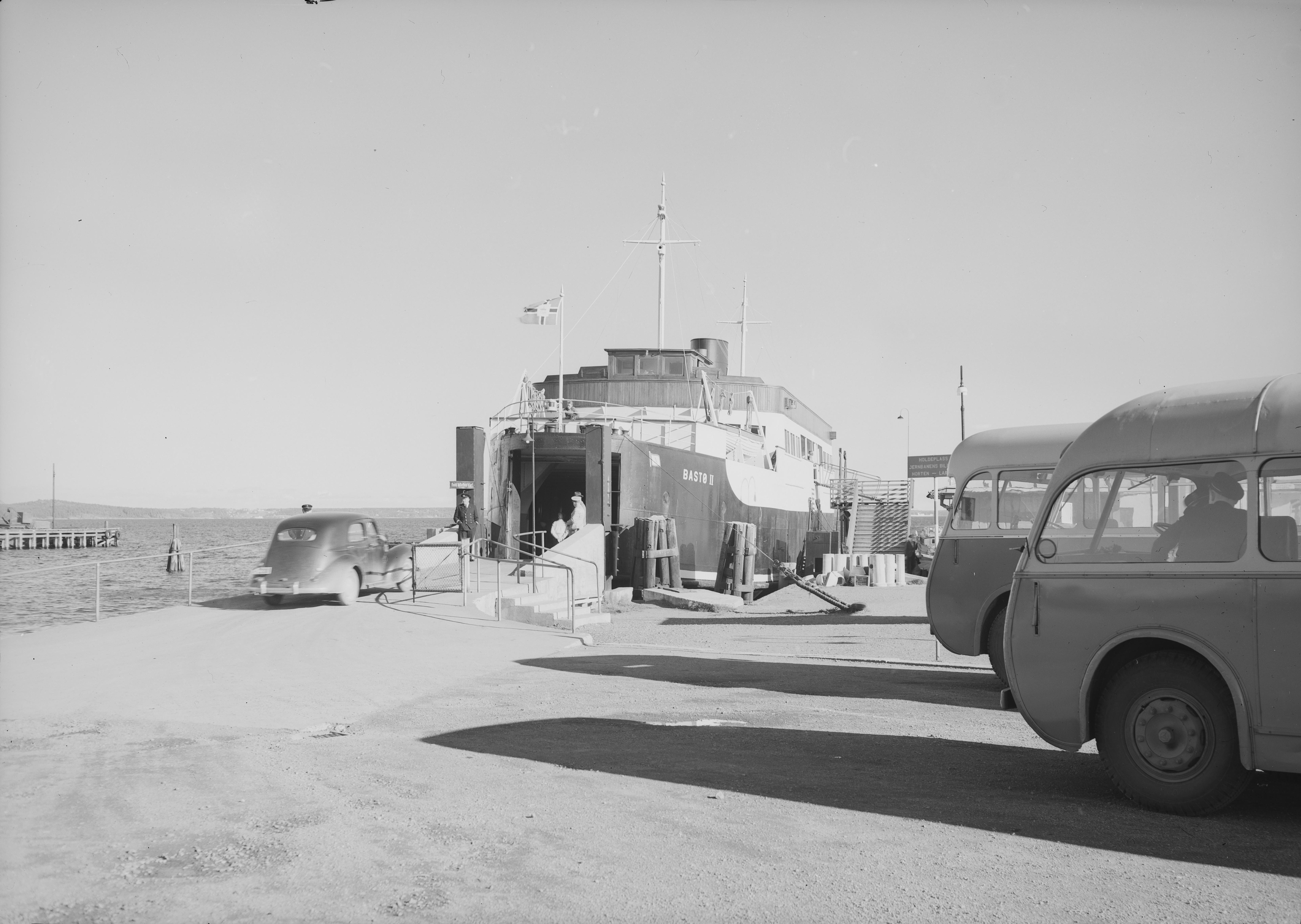
MF Bastø II (1939) loading at Horten in 1950. She was Alpha's first roll on/roll off vessel.

Car traffic exploded in the following years, from three thousand annual cars in 1933 to eighteen thousand in 1939. Queues at the quays grew, to large frustration for the traveling public. Alpha ordered a new ship in 1937, which was delivered two years later. Named MF Bastø II (1939), she was a ro-ro ferry with capacity for 34 cars and 600 passengers, costing 810 thousand kroner. She was put into service as the main ferry, while Bastø (1934) was kept as a reserve.

=== Second World War ===
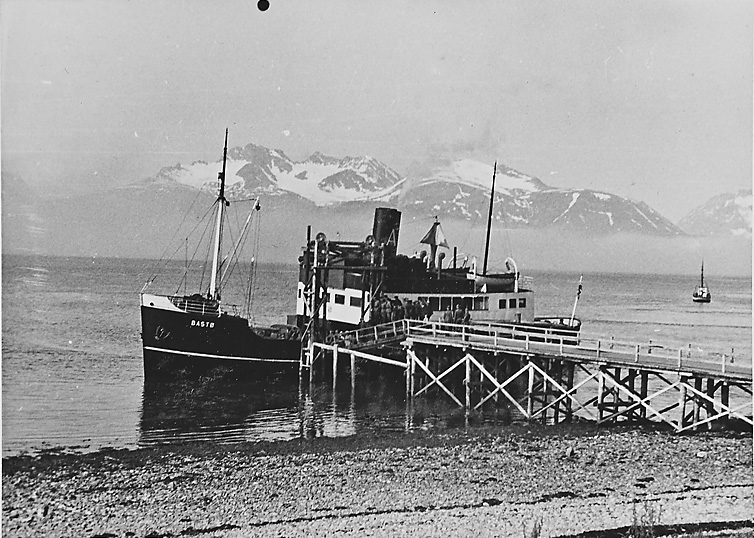
SS Bastø (1934) in Lyngen during the Second World War.

Bastø II continued operating all day on 9 April 1940, during the German invasion of Norway, as waves of Kriegsmarine warships and flocks of Luftwaffe aircraft made their way up the Oslofjord. Norway's main navy base at Karljohansvern in Horten was under bombardment, with the Norwegian Navy returning fire. The odd minesweeper and fighter approached the ferry, but ignored her once they realized she was a civilian vessels. Traffic was heavy, as many people needed to cross the fjord. In the evening, Horten was evacuated, and many of the town's population fled with the ferry. Wharf supervisor Hansen, who let loose Bastø II's last moorings, is said to have been the only person to spend the night in town. Services were terminated the next day, but resumed on 13 April and continued in a reduced capacity until late 1944.

During the German occupation of Norway, the Germany authorities gradually requisitioned all but one of Alpha's ships. Bastø II was kept on the Moss–Horten service until late 1944, when it was also requisitioned. Beta was put into the service until January 1945, when Bastø was finished with repairs and put into service. She was supplemented by Bastø II from 7 July.

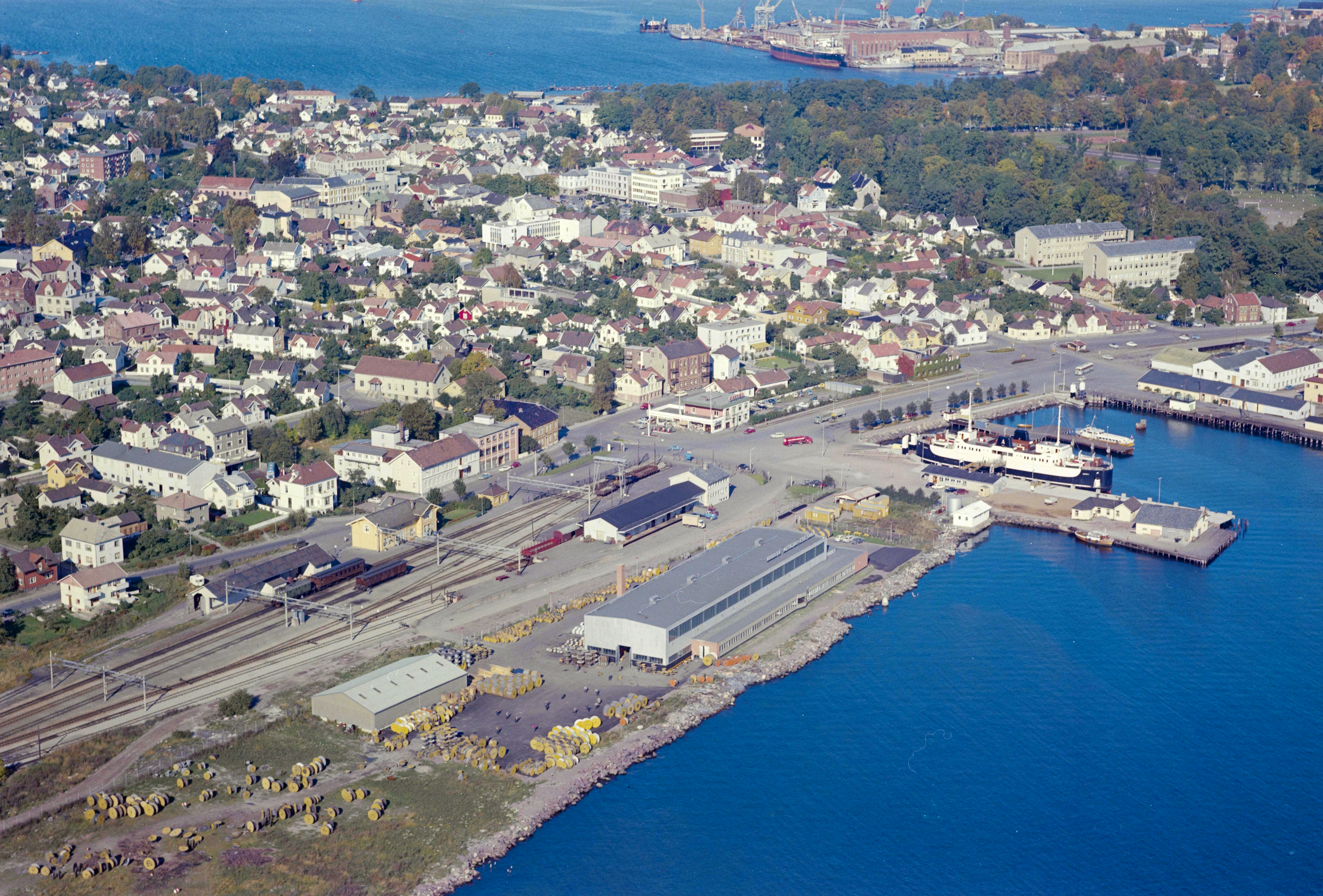
Horten in 1964, with the ferry quay and Horten Station, showing the close priximity between the railway and the ferry.

=== Proposed railway ferry ===
Both quays of the Moss–Horten service were right at the railway, Moss Station and Horten Station, respectively. Moss Municipality established a committee in 1914 which looked into if a railway ferry should be built between the two stations. It spent eleven years before it came with a positive conclusion. Additional proposals would follow, although nothing ever materialized. A major issue was the break of gauge between the Østfold Line and the Vestfold Line, making through trains impossible. The Vestfold Line was rebuilt to standard gauge in 1949, which renewed proposals for a railway ferry.

=== Four sisters ===
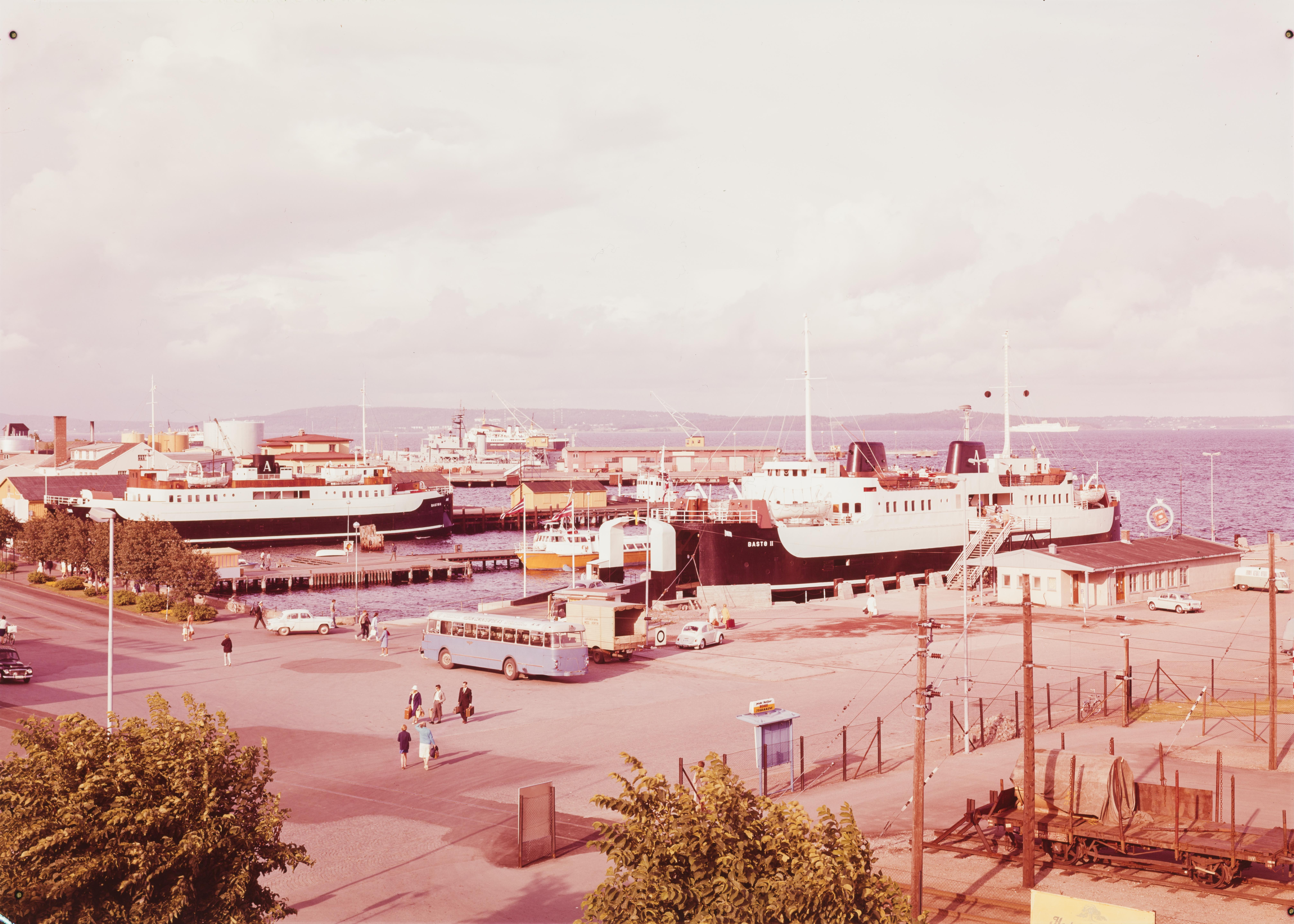
MF Bastø II (1961) and MF Bastø III (1949) at dock in Horten

By 1946, traffic had doubled compared to 1939, and increased capacity was needed between Moss and Horten. Alpha ordered a new ship in January 1947, which entered service in September 1949 as Bastø (1949). It was a sister ship to Bastø II (1939), but with a slightly larger lounge and more efficient use of the car deck.

By 1956, annual traffic on the Moss–Horten route passed one hundred thousand cars. Alpha decided to solve the issue by building a third vessel for the route. Although similar in overall design to the existing two ferries, she had a capacity for 55 cars and 600 passengers, with a speed of 11 knots (20 km/h; 13 mph). The new ferry was named Bastø I (1956), while the old Bastø I was renamed Bastø III. The new Bastø I became the new standard for Alphas ships, and three more sister ships were delivered, in 1961 (Bastø II), 1964 (Bastø IV) and 1968 (Bastø III). The old Bastø II (1939) was sold in 1961, and the old Bastø III (1949) sold in 1969.

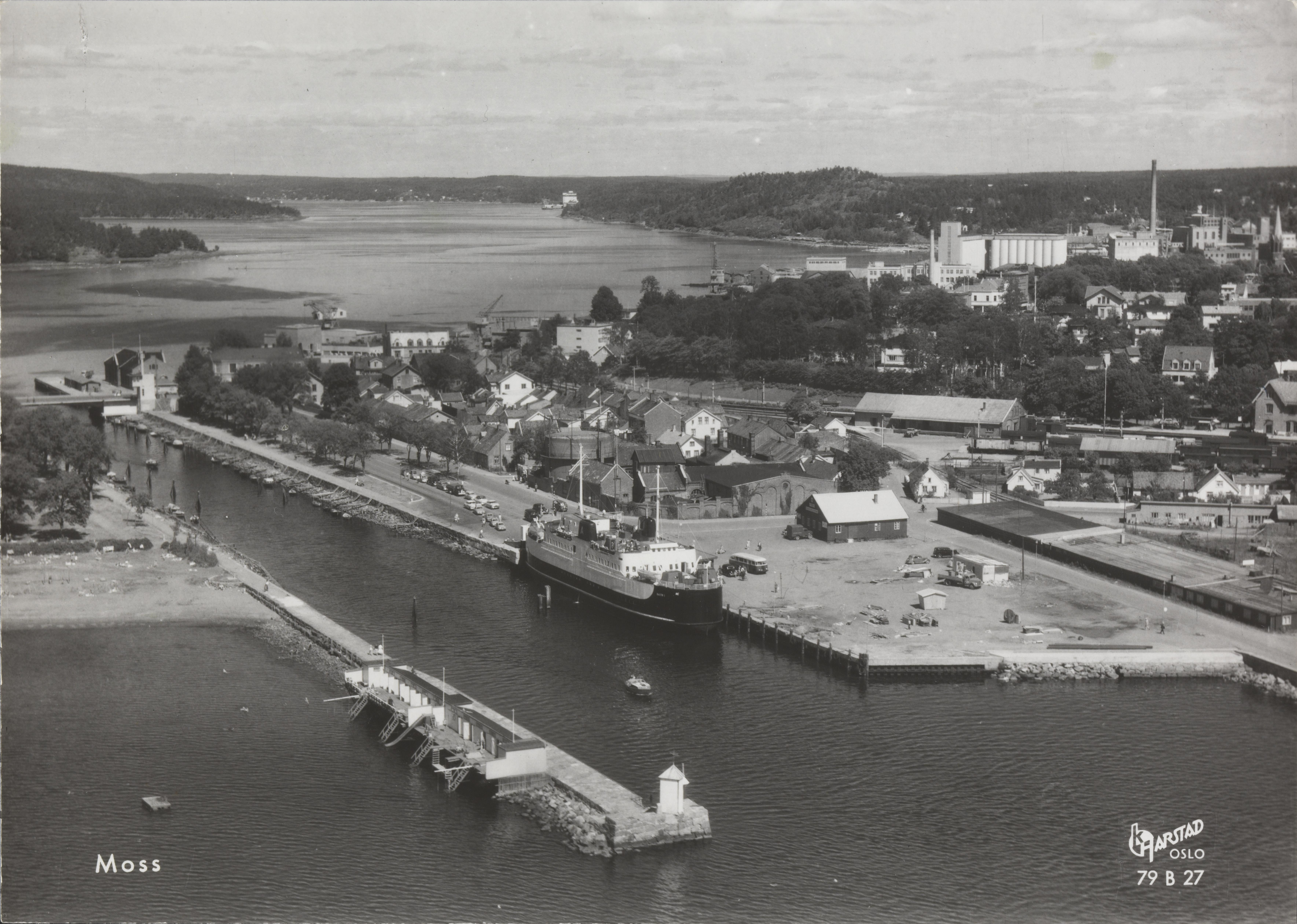
MF Bastø I at dock in Moss

The new Bastø I was built as a combined car and railway ferry, although it was never used to transport trains. By the second ship was built, any plans to act as a railway ferry had been abandoned, and none of the other received tracks. With four sister ships, Alpha could operate with four ships in service during the summer, and two the rest of the year. To keep their concession, the authorities demanded high reliability and ample spare capacity. Four ships allowed for continued operation, even if a single ferry broke down. Scheduled maintenance was kept to the off-season. Small ships allowed for quick turn-around times even with a single file. As an added bonus, passengers experienced frequent departures.

Norway experienced a car ferry boom during the 1960s. The operations of these ferries were most places left to private enterprise, and so Alpha being a private car ferry operator was the norm. However, most ferries had insufficient traffic to turn a profit. The government there devised a system to subsidize the operations. Alpha was one of only three ferry operators, along with Rutelaget Askøy–Bergen and Mjøsfærgene, who did not receive subsidies, as they had sufficient traffic to turn a profit. From 1968 a standardized system of national ticket fees were introduced, and regulated by the government. Alpha was not obliged to follow these fees, but chose to do so on its own accord.

=== Fewer and larger ferries ===
By the 1970s traffic had again outpaced the fleet's capacity. Although adding additional small ferries had provided operational flexibility, it was becoming an expensive mode of operation. Large wage hikes and recruitment challenges led to spike in costs, which could not be covered through increased revenue. Alpha therefore decided to buy a larger ferry, Bastø V (1973). It would be used on the Moss–Horten service during summer, and leased abroad during the off-season.

While traffic continued to rise during the 1970s, the regulations hindered Alpha from rising ticket fees as much as costs rose. This led to several years with losses. As a compensation, the authorities from 1974 allowed Alpha to introduce summer fees which were fifty percent higher than the off season. This allowed Alpha to charge more to the tourist, which dominated during the summer, rather than the local population.

Alpha decided that they wanted to have two larger ferries instead of four smaller ones. Bastø V had shown the ease of loading larger amounts. Two sister ships were ordered, with capacity for 190 cars and 700 passengers. Part of the loading and unloading time would be compensated by a faster speed, at 15 knots (28 km/h; 17 mph). Bastø I (1978) was delivered on 6 June 1978 and Bastø II was delivered on 8 June 1979. The new ferries had loading and unloading on two parallel files, could maneuver more accurately at dock due to thrusters. They had much lower operating costs per vehicle than the old ferries, with the same number of crew despite more than three times the capacity.

Three of the four sisters were sold those years, with Bastø III (1968) kept as a reserve until 1985. Passenger loading terminals were built at both quays in 1983, separating passenger and car traffic. After the traffic having grown all through the 1970s, reached a temporary peak in 1979 at 650.000 cars per year, a level not reached again until 1984.

=== Kosmos ===
Alpha merged with the conglomerate Kosmos in 1984. Operations of the Moss–Horten service became a division in the company, which was branded as Bastøyfergen ("The Bastø Ferry"). This was a period with good profits, after the new ferries had cut costs dramatically.

Due high profits raised concerns about that the ferry prices were set too low. Kosmos argued that they needed to generate a profit in order to buy the next generation of ferries. But since the Bastø Ferry division was part of a large corporation, the profits floated out of the ferry division, and would never be used to finance a new ferry.

The ferry operation's director, Niels Brokstad, used the mid-1980s to promote the idea of a "superferry", faster and larger. He had seen how much could be saved by going from four to two ferries, and therefore proposed going to only one. If its cruise speed could be increased to 20 knots (37 km/h; 23 mph), it would be able to do a round trip sailing in one hour. It would have to have a capacity for 400 cars, and that would require four parallel lanes of loading and unloading vehicles.

The superferry project was met with resistance. One issue was that many believed it simply would not have sufficient capacity to take the estimated traffic in the 1990s. The other was that National Road 19 in both Moss and Horten was lacked capacity to take so much traffic at once. Both the quays and the highway would need massive upgrades, costs which would fall on the taxpayers. Nothing came of the proposal.

=== Gokstad ===
Kosmos was taken over by I. M. Skaugen in 1989, and the two merged in 1991. Kosmos CEO Bjørn Bettum left his position as part of this, and in the process was able to buy the Moss–Horten Ferry operations through the company Gokstad.

The transfer of ownership triggered a review of the ferry's concession. The company was operating with a profit margin of thirty percent, and both the local population and the authorities were concerned about the high fares. These fares were limited by the terms of the concession, which on the other hand limited anyone from simply starting a competing route.

During this process, a joint venture between Torghatten Trafikkselskap and Fosen Trafikklag handling in an application for the route. Gokstad's concession was renewed on 21 July, while the competing concession was rejected oon 28 July. The awarded concession lasted until 31 December 1995 The new concession limited the ticket prices, but retained the Gokstad's right to make a "reasonable profit".

Gokstand moved the head office from Moss to Horten. Another issue it had to tackle was their free passes that had been issued in the preceding years. A large number of politicians, transport bureaucrats and businesspeople all received free passes on the ferries. But it was increasingly realized by everyone involved that this amounted to corruption, and was quietly abandoned.

A contributing factor to the Fosen–Torghatten initiative, was increasing discontent with high prices and long waiting times, especially during the summer. Gokstad looked into the possibility of extending the two ferries, but instead opted to order a newbuild. MF Vestfold was delivered in April 1991, with a capacity for 250 cars and 700 passengers, able to cruise at 15 knots (28 km/h; 17 mph). Bastø II was renamed MF Østfold on 1 July 1991, after going through a modernization. Bastø I was sold. Vestfold had two stories with car deck. This allowed for faster loading and unloading, but required large re-works of the docks at both Moss and Horten.

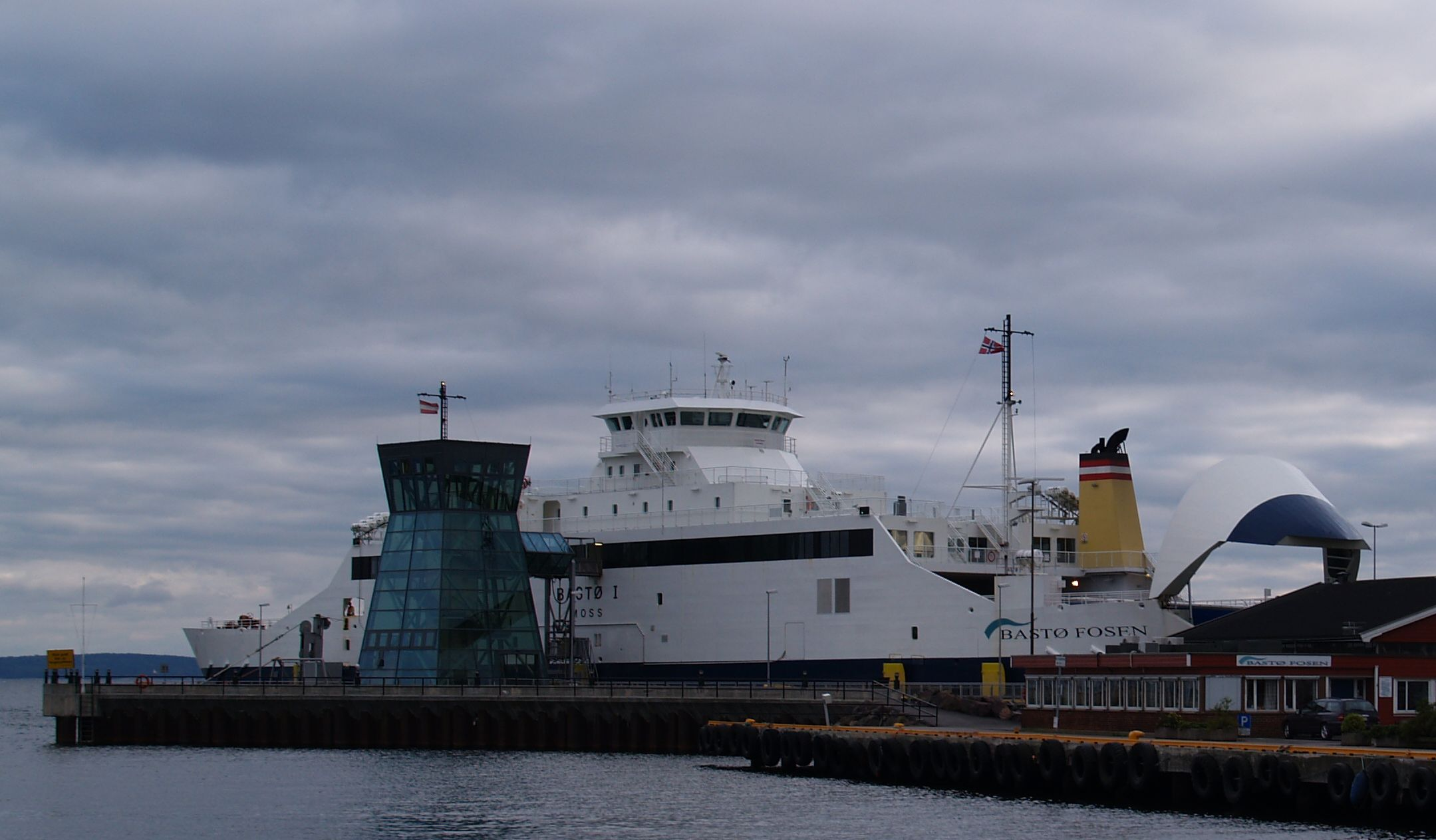
MF Bastø I in Horten

=== Change of concessioneer ===
When the concession was up for renewal, for the period from 1996 to 2005, both Gokstad and Fosen Trafikklag put in a bid. This time the authorities preferred the bid from Fosen, who was awarded the ten-year concession on 12 September 1995. The main argument was that Fosen would be able to operate for 100 million kroner lower fares for the ten-year period. Gokstad complained, but this was rejected. They then sued to the government, but lost.

Services from Moss to Horten were taken over by Fosen's newly established subsidiary Bastø Fosen on 1 January 1996. Due to the short deadline from concession to start-up, Fosen was forced to lease vessels until new ships were built. For the very first days they used the incuments Vestfold and Østfold. They then borrowed MF Trondheim from the Flakk–Rørvik service, and MF Meldarskin. The latter had issues with the ice, and so for a while only Trondheim was serving the route. Fosen bought two temporary ferries, MF Einar Tambarskjelve and MF Holger Stjern, which were used until the two newbuild were completed in June 1997. MF Bastø I (1997) and MF Bastø II (1997) had twin car-decks with a capacity for 200 cars and 450 passengers.

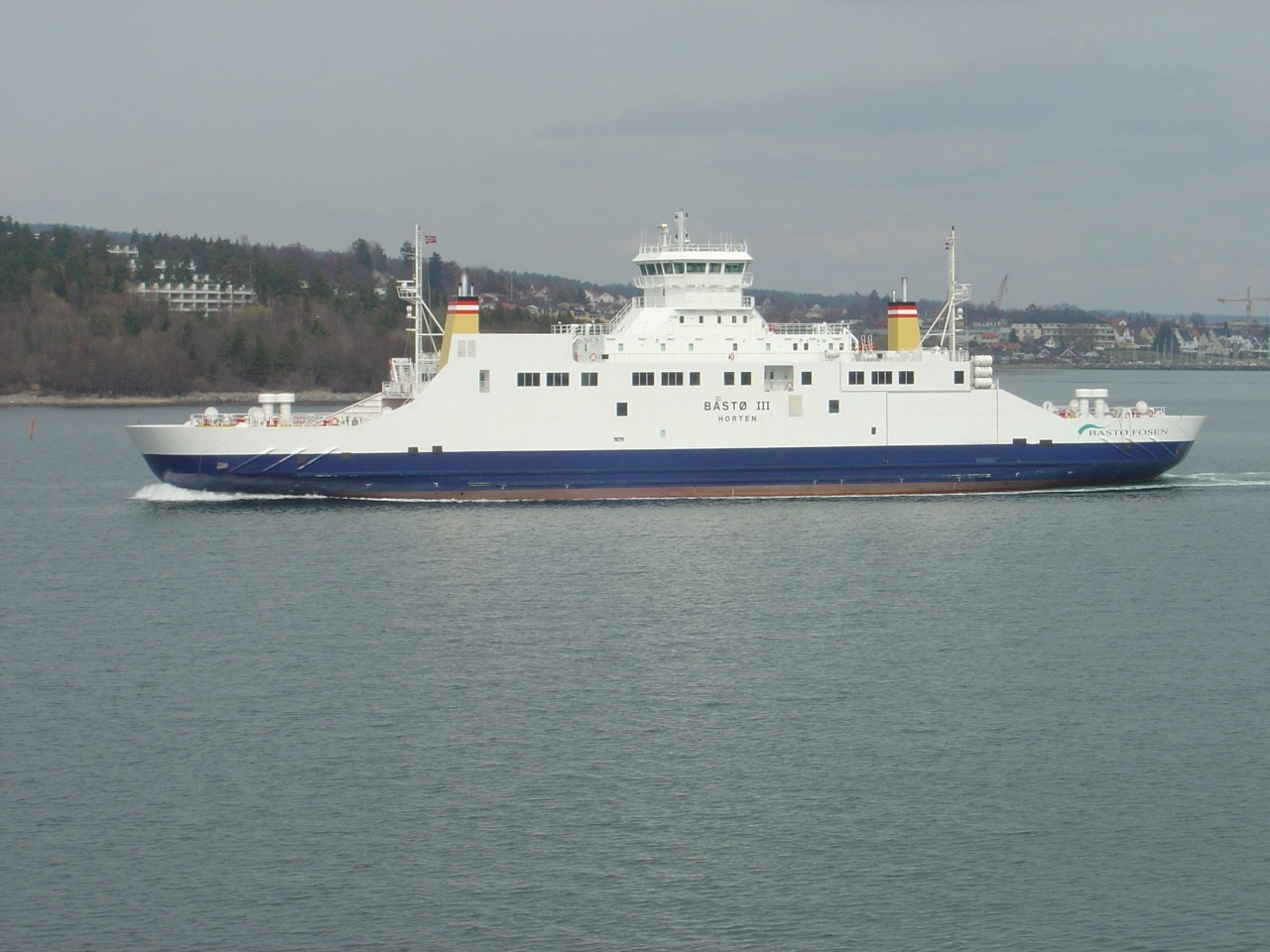
MF Bastø III

Traffic shot up during after Bastø Fosen took over, making it clear that more capacity was needed. From 2001, MF Sogn was chartered and put in as stop-gap during the summer. A third sister ferry, Bastø III (2005) was delivered in 2005, after Bastø Fosen had received a ten-year extension of their concession.

Bastø won the 4.5 billion kr concession for the period 2014-2023, also using diesel ferries.

The operating company changed its name from Bastø Fosen to Torghatten Sør in 2024.

== Proposed fixed link ==
The first proposals for a fixed link across the fjord was taken further north, as a replacement for the Drøbak–Storsand Ferry. The proposal called for a suspension bridge crossing of both Drøbanksundet and Svelviksundet. Such a proposal would eat away a significant amount of the Moss–Horten traffic, but not all. Althoug initially laid dead due to the large costs, many of the ideas resurfaced during the Oslo Airport location controversy in the 1980s, when the airport was suggested located on Hurumlandet. In the end a subsea tunnel was chosen. The Oslofjord Tunnel opened in 2000. It was built without a branch towards Vestfold and in practice did not provide use for anyone needed to get south of Drammen. This left ample traffic for the Moss–Horten crossing.

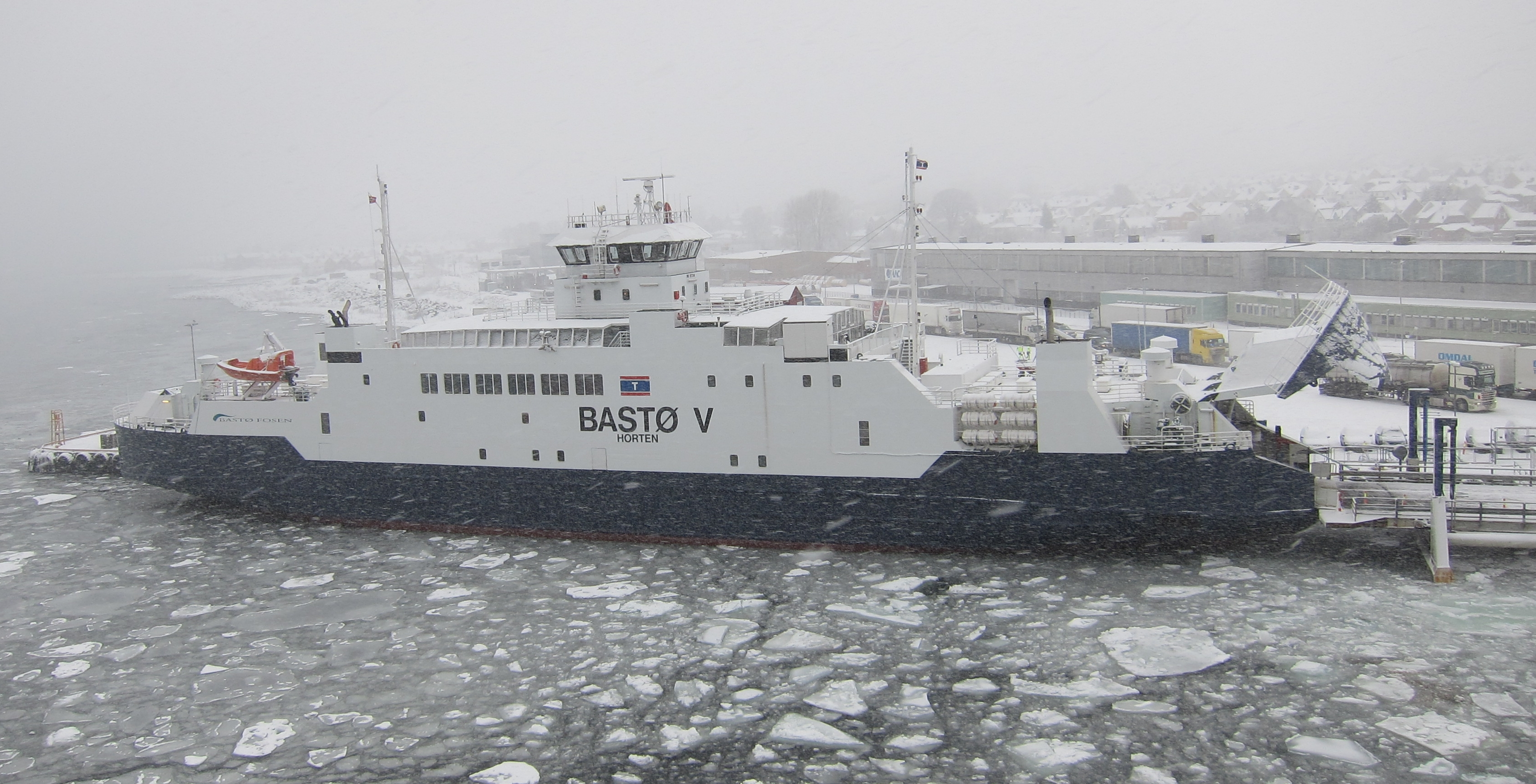
MF Bastø V (1990) in Horten in 2013. Seaice is a common issue for the ferries during winter.

The idea for a fixed link further south resurfaced. In 2008, the Public Roads Administration (PRA) published a report showing that a four-lane tunnel would cost 5 billion kr while a bridge would cost 15 billion. A tunnel would need to be 17 kilometres (11 mi) to meet European Union requirements for maximum 6% gradient; the tunnel would be 325 metres (1,066 ft) below sea level. It would be fully financed as a toll road. An alternative includes also building a railway line parallel with the tunnel; this would make it 32 kilometres (20 mi) long to allow a gradient of 2.5%. Local politicians preferred hybrid ferry or were divided about a combined railroad and road bridge, while the PRA had left out railroad for economic reasons.

Since 2014, the process became more concrete and the local debate louder after the Public Roads Administration published a concept evaluation study (KVU). Here they prefer bridge to tunnel, mainly for economic reasons. Grassroots movements, particularly in Moss, alluded to negative effects for the environment and aesthetics and succeeded in March 2015 to turn a clear majority of the Moss City Council against the bridge. Shortly after the PRA and then the Ministry made public the list of major road projects for the next 35 years and the Oslo Fjord crossing is not on the list.

The route began operating its first electric ferry on March 1, 2021, with the current diesel Bastø 4 and Bastø 6 to be converted later.

== Fleet ==
List of ships operating by Alpha
Name	Built	Shipyard	Cars	Pax	Start	End	Notes	Ref
SS Bastø	1885		0		1910	1928		
SS Bastø II	1900	Akers mekaniske Verksted	5	260	1910	1951	Renamed SS Beta in 1935.	
SS Bastø	1934	Moss Værft & Dokk	18	400	1934	1952	Renamed SS Alpha in 1949.	
MF Bastø II	1939		34	600	1939	1961		
MF Bastø	1949		34	600	1949	1969	Renamed MF Bastø III in 1956 and MF Beta in 1968	
MF Bastø I	1956	Pusnes Mekaniske Verksted	55	600	1956	1979	Renamed MF Bastø IV in 1978	
MF Bastø II	1961		55	600	1961	1979	Renamed MF Bastø IV in 1979	
MF Bastø IV	1964	Moss Værft & Dokk	55	600	1964	1978		
MF Bastø III	1968		55	600	1968	1985		
MF Bastø V	1973	Moss Verft	120	700	1973	1981		
Bastø I	1978	Framnæs Mekaniske Værksted	190	700	1989	1991		
Bastø II	1979	Moss Verft	190	700	1989	1995		
Vestfold	1991	Trønderverftet	250	750	1991	1995		
MF Fosen	1989	Fosen Mekaniske Verksteder	140	500	1996	1997		
MF Meldarskin			120	700	1996	1997		
MF Einar Tambarskjelve	1971	Trosvik Verksted			1996	1997		
MF Holger Stjern	1970	Kristiansand Mekaniske Verksted			1996	1997		
MF Bastø I	1997	Fosen Mekaniske Verksteder	200	450	1997			
MF Bastø II	1997	Fosen Mekaniske Verksteder	200	450	1997			
MF Sogn	1982	Trønderverftet	120	700	2001	2005		
Bastø III	2005	Remontowa	107	383	2005	2019		
MF Stavanger	2003	Fjellstrand	114	350	2010	2011		
MF Bastø IV	1986		106	399	2010	2016	Renamed Bastø VII in 2016	
MF Bastø V	1990	Trønderverftet	115	399	2013	2019	Renamed Bastø VIII in 2016	
MF Melshorn	1999	Fiskarstrand Verft	120	350	2015	2016		
MF Bastø V	2016	Sefine Shipyard	200	600	2017	–		
MF Bastø IV	2016	Sefine Shipyard	200	600	2017	–		
MF Bastø VI	2016	Sefine Shipyard	200	600	2017	–		
MF Bastø Electric	2020	Sefine Shipyard			2021	–		

== Bibliography ==
- Boye, Tore (2005). Anders Jahres pengebinge (in Norwegian). Baltic Business Development. ISBN 82-996932-0-9.
- Hansen, Finn R. (2001). Selskapet og dets fartøyer: Fosen Trafikklag ASA (in Norwegian).
- Ringdal, Niels Johan (1994). Moss bys historie: Perioden 1880–1990 (PDF) (in Norwegian). Moss: Moss Municipality.
- Ryggvik, Helge; Søilen, Espen (1992). Bastøfergen: Fra damplekter til brikke i pengespillet (in Norwegian). Sandefjord: Gokstad.
- Schulstad, Per (1967). Aktieselskapet Alpha gjennom 75 år (in Norwegian). Moss.
