= Morits =

Morits is a given name. Notable people with the given name include:

- Morits Skaugen (1920–2005), Norwegian yacht racer and businessman
- Morits Skaugen Jr. (born 1955), Norwegian businessman, son of Morits
