= SS Bastø II =

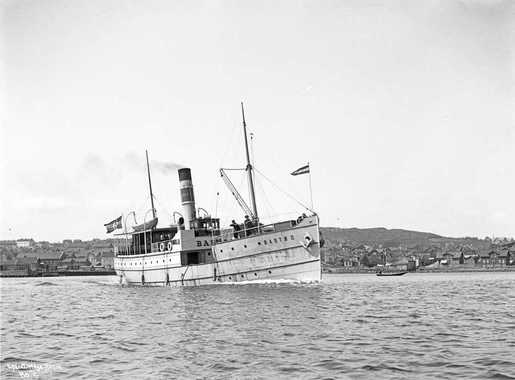

History
- Name: SS Bastø II (1900–1929); SS Bastø 2 (1929–34); SS Beta (1934–53)
- Owner: Moss–Horten Dampskibsselskab (1900–1910); Alpha (1910–53)
- Operator: Moss–Horten Dampskibsselskab (1900–1910); Royal Norwegian Navy (1939–40); Alpha (1910–53)
- Port of registry: Moss
- Ordered: 1899
- Builder: Akers Mekaniske Verksted
- Yard number: 190
- Completed: May 1900
- Identification: Call sign: LCMR, HCSK
- Fate: Broken in 1953

General characteristics
- Type: Coastal steamship
- Tonnage: 177 GRT / 87 NRT
- Length: 36 m (117 ft)
- Beam: 6 m (20 ft)
- Draught: 2.7 m (9 ft)
- Installed power: 203 kW (276 hp)
- Propulsion: two-cyinder compound steam engine
- Speed: 11.5 kn (21.3 km/h; 13.2 mph)

SS Bastø II was a coastal passenger and cargo steamship built by Akers Mekaniske Verksted for Moss–Horten Dampskibsselskab in 1900. There she was used on the Moss–Horten Ferry, and later on routes from Moss to Oslo. She and the company were taken over by Alpha in 1910. She was renamed SS Bastø 2 in 1929 and SS Beta in 1934. She remained in service with Alpha until 1951 and was scrapped in 1953.

== Specifications ==
After she was rebuilt in 1929, she had a registered tonnage of 177 gross and 87 net. She had a length of 36 meters (117 ft), a beam of 6 meters (20 ft) and a draught of 2.7 meters (9 ft). She was equipped with a two-cylinder compound steam engine capable of 203 kW (276 hp). This gave her a speed of 11.5 knots (21.3 km/h; 13.2 mph).

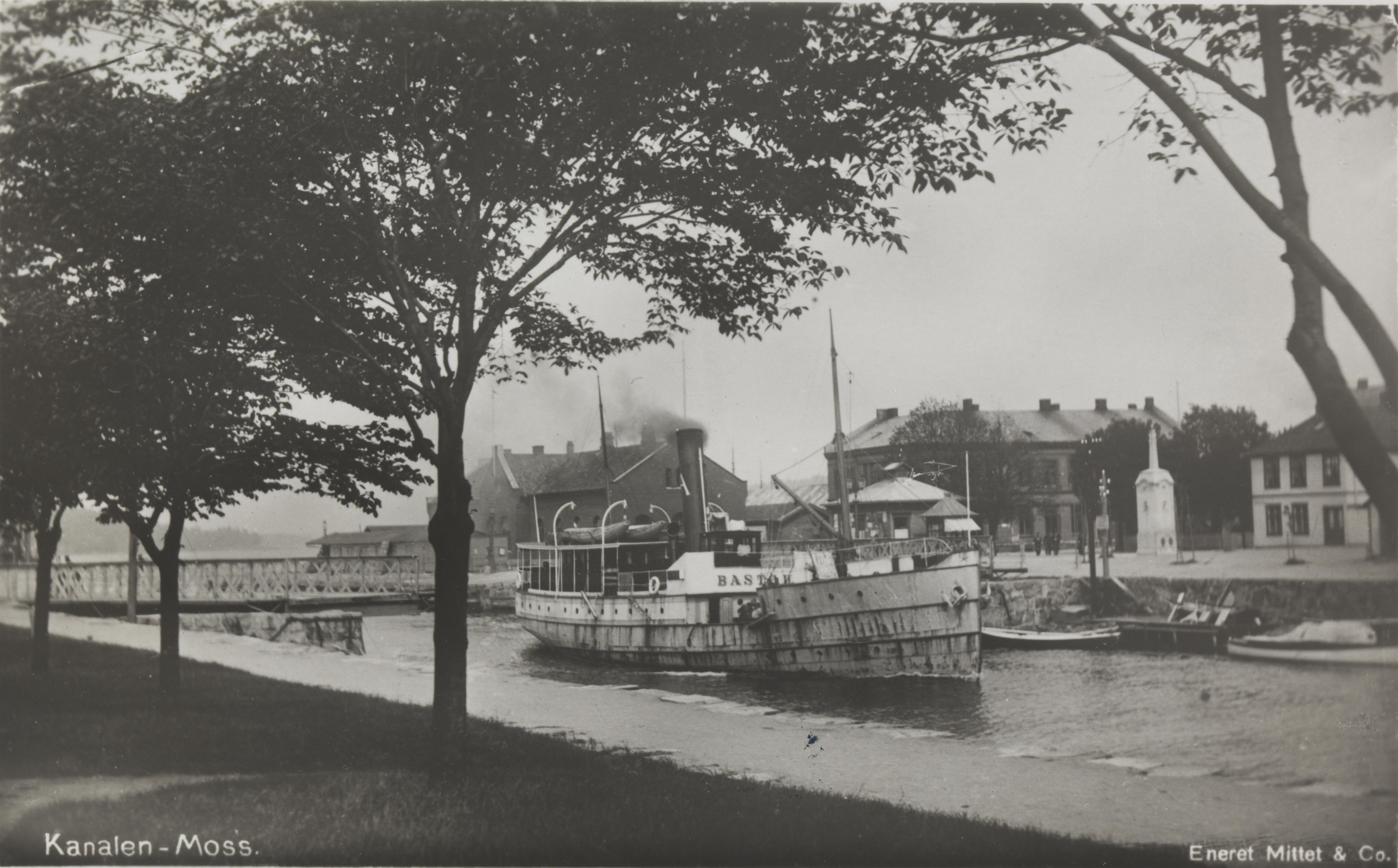
The ship in Moss

She could carry 260 passengers and, at least in theory, could hoist two cars into its hold. This was later increased to five cars.

== History ==
SS Bastø II was ordered by Moss–Horten Dampskibsselskab, as a replacement for SS Bastø. Bastø II was built by Akers Mekaniske Verksted and delivered in May 1900. She was put into the Moss–Horten service.

Moss–Horten Dampskibsselskab was sold to Moss' only other significant shipping company, Alpha, in December 1910. Bastø II continued with her cross-fjord services. Although capable of carrying vehicles, this was the exception. Cars had to be hoisted onto the ship by crane, and caused a disruption in the time schedule by about half an hour. The first car was carried across the fjord in 1907. From the 1920s, it was becoming common for her to carry cars.

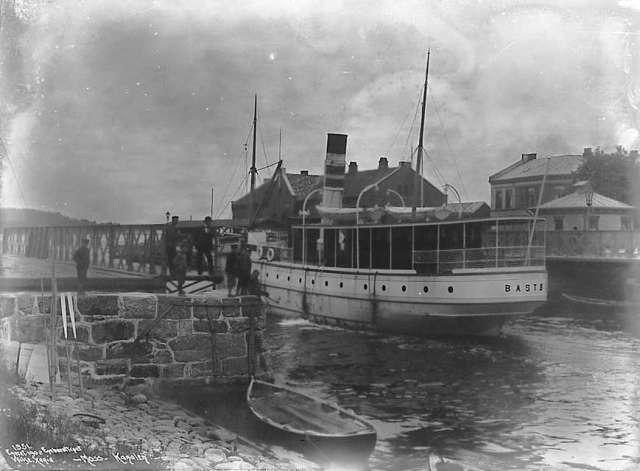
The ship in Moss

The ship was lengthened in 1929, as a stop-gap measure, increasing her car carrying capacity for two to five. She was also renamed from Bastø II to Bastø 2. But the need for a proper car ferry would end Bastø 2' reign as Alpha's flagship.

Her replacement, SS Bastø, was delivered in 1934. This allowed Bastø 2 to be taken out of service for a modernization. She was then renamed DS Beta and used either as a reserve on the main crossing, or on various other routes. A new SS Bastø II was built in 1939, removing any need for Beta to act as a reserve on the Moss–Horten route.

Beta was leased to the Royal Norwegian Navy from September 1939, for 100 kroner per day. She was captured by the Kriegsmarine on 9 April 1940, during the German invasion of Norway. Alpha contacted them and offered to sell them to the Germans for the insured value. Initially the Germans claimed it was war gains as it had been equipped with a canon, but ended up returning her to her owners in May. The German authories requisisioned a larger and larger portion of Alpha's fleet. In the end, Beta was the only ship left which could operate on the Moss–Horten route, from late 1944 to January 1945.

From the end of the war, Beta was put into the predominately cargo route between Oslo and Moss. Alpha terminated this service in 1950, leaving the company without a need for Beta. She was sold in September 1961 Berntsen & Sønner Slip & Mek. Verk. in Ny-Hellesund, who converted her to a pure cargo vessel. They failed to find a buyer for her. She was sold for scrap to Stavanger Skibs Ophugnings Co in 1953 and scrapped.

== Bibliography ==
- Bakka, Dag (1974). Bergenske fjordabåtar (in Norwegian Nynorsk). Bergen: Bergens Tidende. ISBN 8271310070.
- Ringdal, Nils Johan (1994). Moss bys historie: Perioden 1880–1990 (PDF) (in Norwegian). Moss: Moss Municipality.
- Schulstad, Per (1967). Aktieselskapet Alpha gjennom 75 år (in Norwegian). Moss.
