= SS Bastø (1885) =

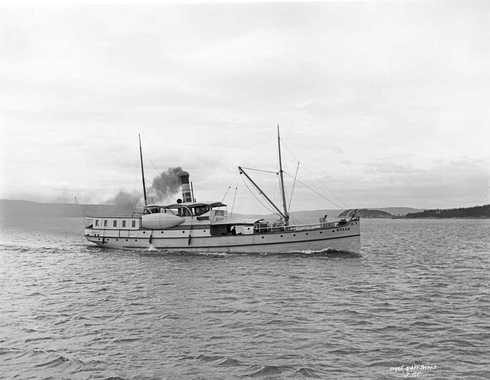
- DS Bastø in 1901

History
- Name: SS Bastø (1885–1928); SS Holsenøy (1928–49)
- Owner: Moss–Horten Dampskibsselskab (1885–1910); Alpha (1910–28); Alversund og Meland Eimbaatlag (1928–42); Alversund og Manger Dampbaatlag (1942–49)
- Operator: Moss–Horten Dampskibsselskab (1885–1910); Alpha (1910–28); Alversund og Meland Eimbaatlag (1928–42); Alversund og Manger Dampbaatlag (1942–49)
- Port of registry: Moss (1885–1928); Bergen (1928–49)
- Ordered: 1884
- Builder: Akers Mekaniske Verksted
- Yard number: 106
- Completed: January 1885
- Identification: Call sign: JWBK
- Fate: Broken in 1949

General characteristics
- Type: Vehicle and passenger ferry
- Tonnage: 88 GRT / 37 NRT (1885–1901); 115 GRT / 51 NRT (1901–19); 127 GRT / 70 NRT (1919–49)
- Length: 20.6 m (80.6 ft) (1885–1901); 26.1 m (95.4 ft) (1901–)
- Beam: 5.2 m (17.1 ft)
- Draught: 2.4 m (7.8 ft)
- Installed power: 87 kW (117 hp)
- Propulsion: two-cyinder compound steam engine
- Speed: 10 kn (19 km/h; 12 mph)

SS Bastø was a coastal passenger and cargo steamship built by Akers Mekaniske Verksted for Moss–Horten Dampskibsselskab in 1885. There she was used on the Moss–Horten Ferry, and later on routes from Moss to Oslo. She and the company were taken over by Alpha in 1910.

The vessel was sold to Alversund og Meland Eimbaatlag of Bergen in 1928, who renamed her SS Holsenøy. Through a corporate merger, the ownership passed to Alversund og Manger Dampbaatlag in 1942.

== Specifications ==
The vessel was built with a register tonnage of 88 gross and 37 net. She had a length of 20.6 meters (80.6 ft), a beam of 5.2 meters (17.1 ft) and a draught of 2.4 meters (7.8 ft). She was equipped with a two-cylinder compound steam engine cabapble of 87 kW (117 hp). This gave her a speed of 10 knots (19 km/h; 12 mph). At the time, her engine was regarded as quite powerful for a ship her size.

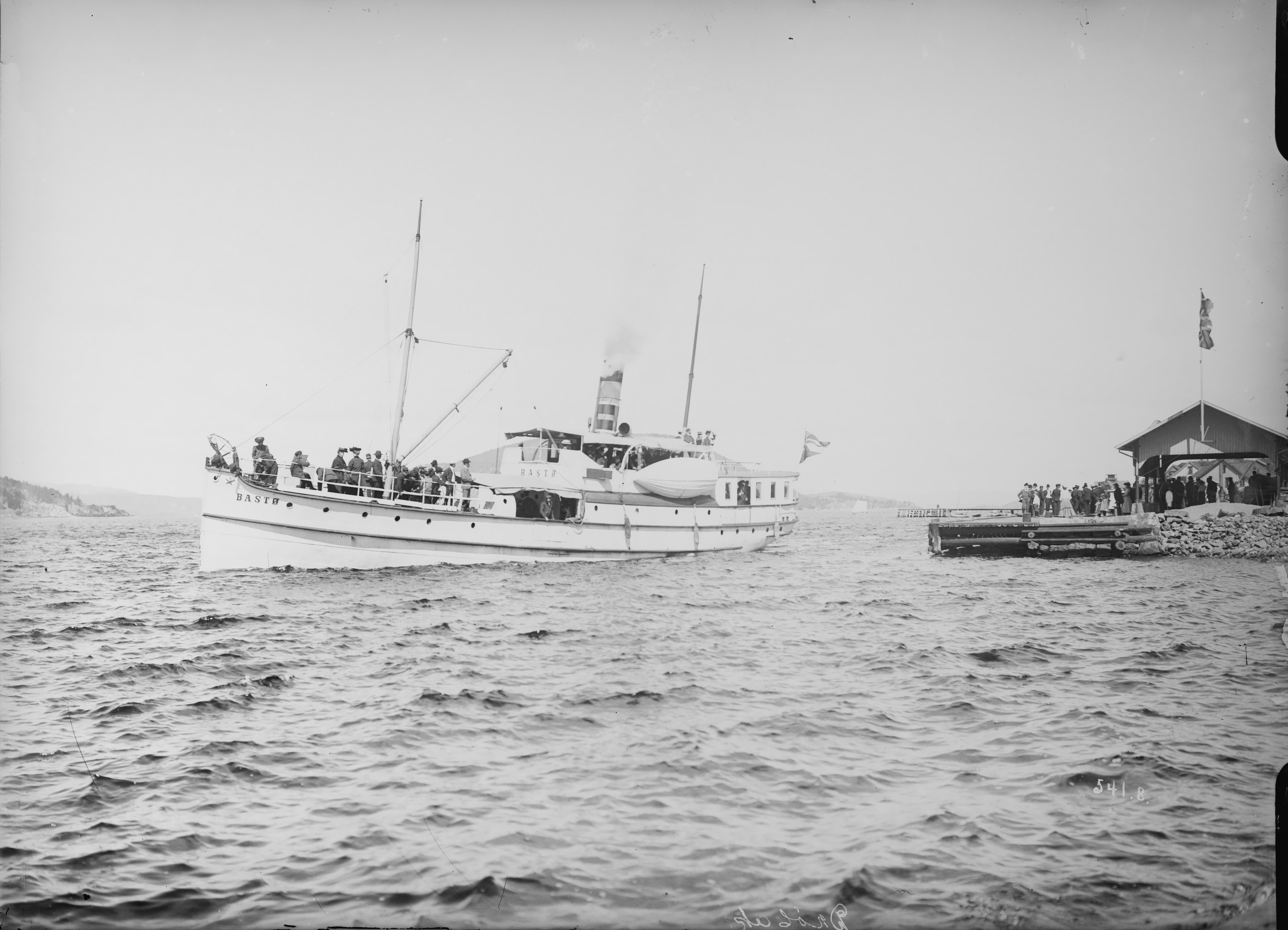
DS Bastø I departing Drøbak

She was lengthened in 1901 by a further 4.5 meters (14.8 ft), bringing her up to 114 gross registry tonnes and 51 net registry tonnes. She was further upgraded again in 1919, bringing her up to 127 and 70 tonnes, respectively.

== History ==
Moss–Horten Dampskibsselskab was founded by Moss resident Richard Peterson in 1884, who started the Moss–Horten crossing of the Oslofjord with the used ship DS Axel. At the same time he ordered a newbuild from Akers Mekaniske Verksted, and DS Bastø to be delivered the following year.

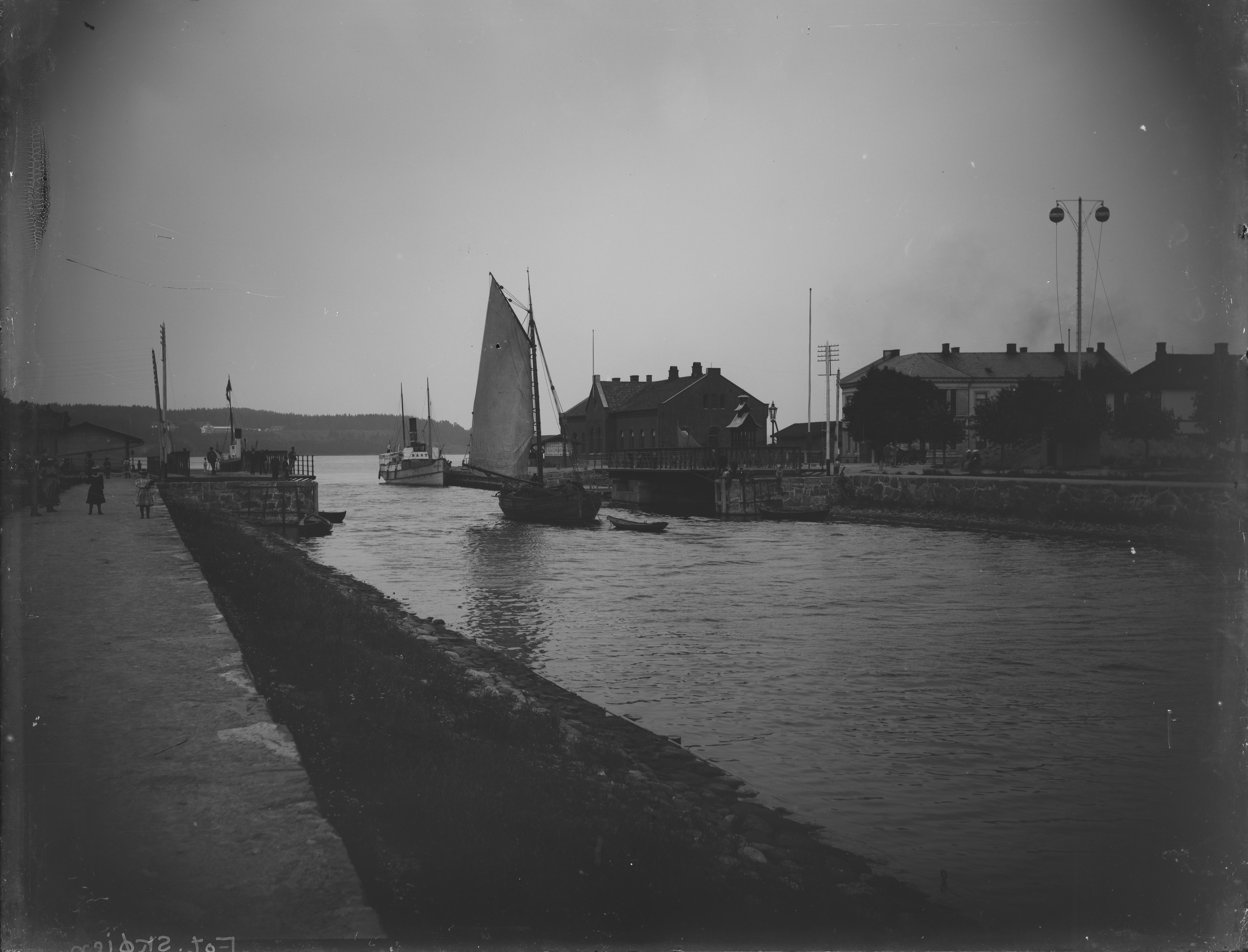
SS Bastø in Moss

Peterson bought the larger ferry SS Bastø II in 1900. It was put into the Moss–Horten service, while Bastø I was first upgraded and then put into service between Moss and Kristiania (today Oslo).

Peterson sold Moss–Horten Dampskibsselskab to Moss' only other significant shipping company, Alpha, in December 1910. There she served in various capacities, including a summer service from Oslo to Moss and onwards to Larkollen, Hankø and Fredrikstad. A further upgrade and enlagement was carried out in 1919.

The ship was sold to the Bergen-based shipping company Alversund og Meland Eimbaatlag and named DS Holsenøy. The company was established only a year before, and Holsenøy was its second and larger ship. Ownership and operations passed, through a corporate merger in 1942, to Alversund og Manger Dampbaatlag. Holsenøy was the only of Alversund og Meland Eimbaatlag's ships which was kept after the merger. By the end of the Second World War in 1945, the ship was seen as not worthy of further repairs by her owner. She was scrapped in 1949.

== Bibliography ==
- Bakka, Dag (1974). Bergenske fjordabåtar (in Norwegian Nynorsk). Bergen: Bergens Tidende. ISBN 8271310070.
- Ringdal, Nils Johan (1994). Moss bys historie: Perioden 1880–1990 (PDF) (in Norwegian). Moss: Moss Municipality.
- Schulstad, Per (1967). Aktieselskapet Alpha gjennom 75 år (in Norwegian). Moss.
