= Berit Bettum =

Norwegian politician (1939–2023)

Berit Marta Maria Haraldsen Bettum (31 January 1939 – 15 December 2023) was a Norwegian politician for the Conservative Party.

== Early and personal life ==
She was born in Oslo as a daughter of professor Haakon Haraldsen (1904–2001) and Hilda Lucia, née Nickel (1907–1996). After finishing her secondary education at Hegdehaugen School in 1957, Berit Haraldsen studied French for one at the University of Toulouse and took commerce school at Oslo Handelsgymnasium in 1959. She graduated from the University of Oslo with the cand.oecon. degree in 1966, having studied during the year 1964–65 at the London School of Economics. In June 1962 she married ship-owner Bjørn Bettum in Uranienborg Church.

== Career ==
Bettum was a mathematics and economics teacher in Tønsberg and Sandefjord, eventually serving as rector of the Vestfold branch of BI Norwegian Business School from 1985 to 1989. From 1990 to 1996 she was the chief executive officer of the family shipping company Gokstad. The company included the division Bastøfergen which operated the Moss–Horten Ferry.

From 1971 to 1975 she was a deputy member of the municipal council of Sandefjord Municipality, and from 1975 to 1987 she was a member of Vestfold county council. She was elected as a deputy representative to the Parliament of Norway for Vestfold for the terms 1977–1981 and 1981–1985. In total she met during 129 days of parliamentary session.

Bettum was a member of numerous municipal committees, as well a board member of several organizations and businesses. Among others, she was a board member of NAVF from 1978 to 1986 (deputy leader from 1983) and chairperson of NAVFs Utredningsinstitutt from 1980 to 1987. She sat on the committee that produced the Norwegian Official Report 1982:44, on press support. She was also a board member of the Society for the Preservation of Ancient Norwegian Monuments from 1975 to 1979 and of World Wildlife Fund Norway from 1987 to 1994. In banking and business, she was a supervisory council member of the Bank of Norway from 1981 to 1989 and Christiania Bank og Kreditkasse from 1983 to 1987, corporate council member of Årdal og Sunndal Verk from 1982 to 1986 and deputy board member of Den Norske Industribank from 1982 to 1990.
