= Moss–Horten Dampskibsselskab =

Norwegian shipping company

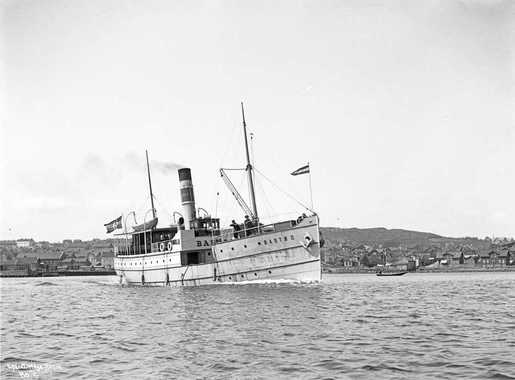
- DS Bastø II
- Company type: Privately held company
- Industry: Shipping
- Founded: 1884; 142 years ago in Moss, Norway
- Founder: Richard Peterson
- Defunct: 1910
- Fate: Sold to Alpha
- Headquarters: Moss, Norway
- Area served: Oslofjord
- Products: Moss–Horten Ferry

Moss–Horten Dampskibsselskab ("Moss–Horten Steamship Company") was a shipping company based in Moss, Norway which operated from 1884 to 1910. It started off operating the Moss–Horten Ferry, which was its main activity for the company's lifetime.

The main ship from 1885 was DS Bastø. From 1900 the company took delivery of DS Bastø II, which was put on the Moss–Horten service. Bastø I was then used for a service from Moss to Kristiania (today Oslo). The company ceased operations in 1910, after it was sold to Moss' other major steamship company, Alpha.

== History ==
The strait between Moss and Horten is the narrowest part of the outer Oslofjord and has therefore been a natural place to row over the fjord since time immemorial. The government had funded such services at least as early as 1582. The arrival of the steamships, which often criss-crossed the fjord, made the ferry service unprofitable, and by the late 1850s it was no longer being provided as such.

The need for a regular crossing between Moss and Horten became more pressing with the arrival of the railways. The Østfold Line opened in 1879 and the Vestfold Line, with the branch Horten Line, opened two years later. Both Moss Station and Horten Station were located a small stroll from the towns' quays.

Local authorities encouraged the Norwegian State Railways to start operating such a service. But the railway was not interested in starting shipping operations.

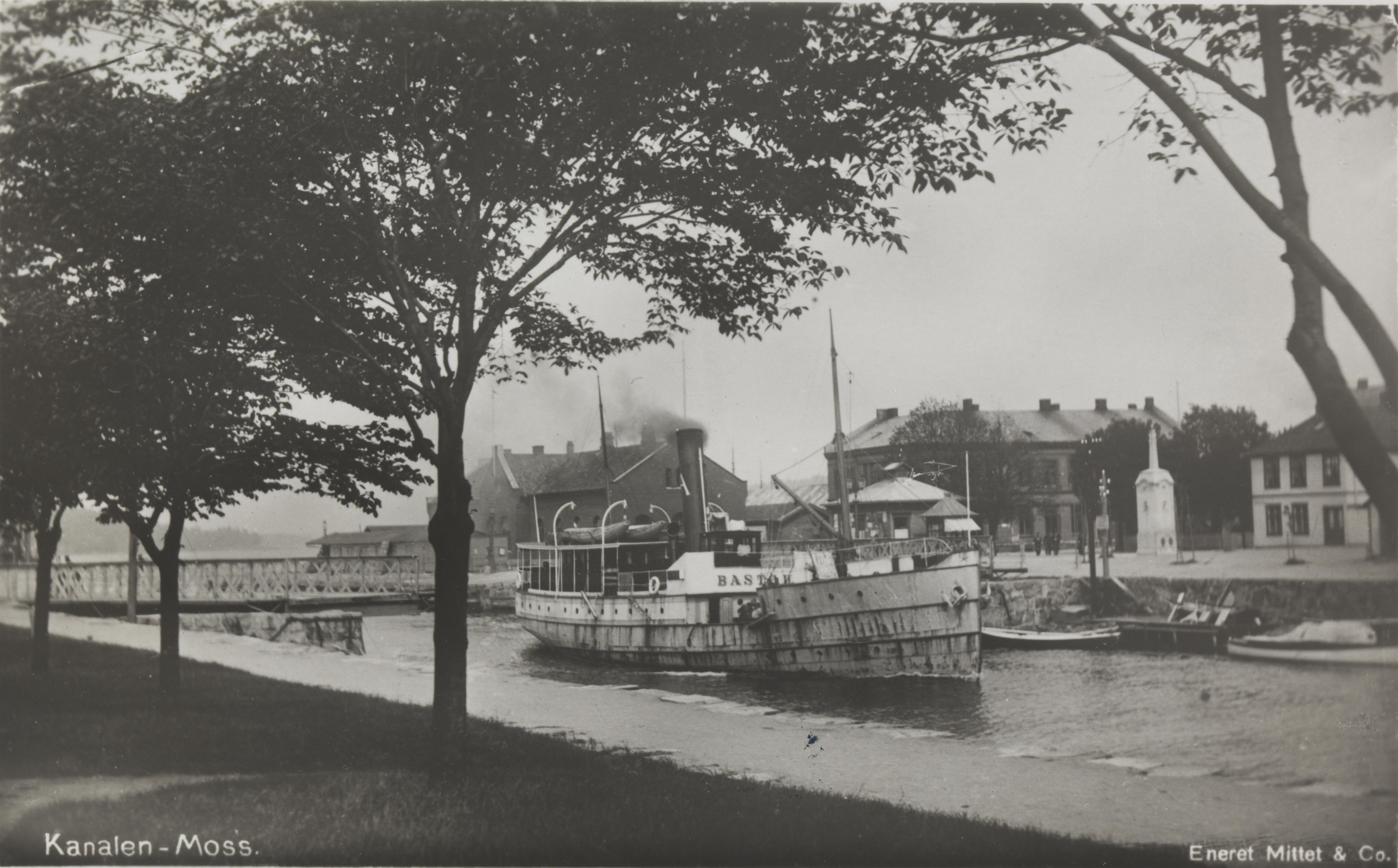
DS Bastø II in Moss

Moss–Horten Dampskibsselskab was founded by Moss resident Richard Peterson in 1884. He believed that there was a sufficient market for a scheduled crossing of the fjord. He procured the vessel DS Axel to get operations up and running, and then ordered the larger ship DS Bastø, with delivery the following year. The service turned out successful, and a third vessel, DS Horten, was ordered as a reserve.

The main issue in the early years was lack of cooperation and coordination with the railways. They regarded at first the ferry service as a competitor, and refused to align the schedules with it. After a while the railways set up favorable scheules.

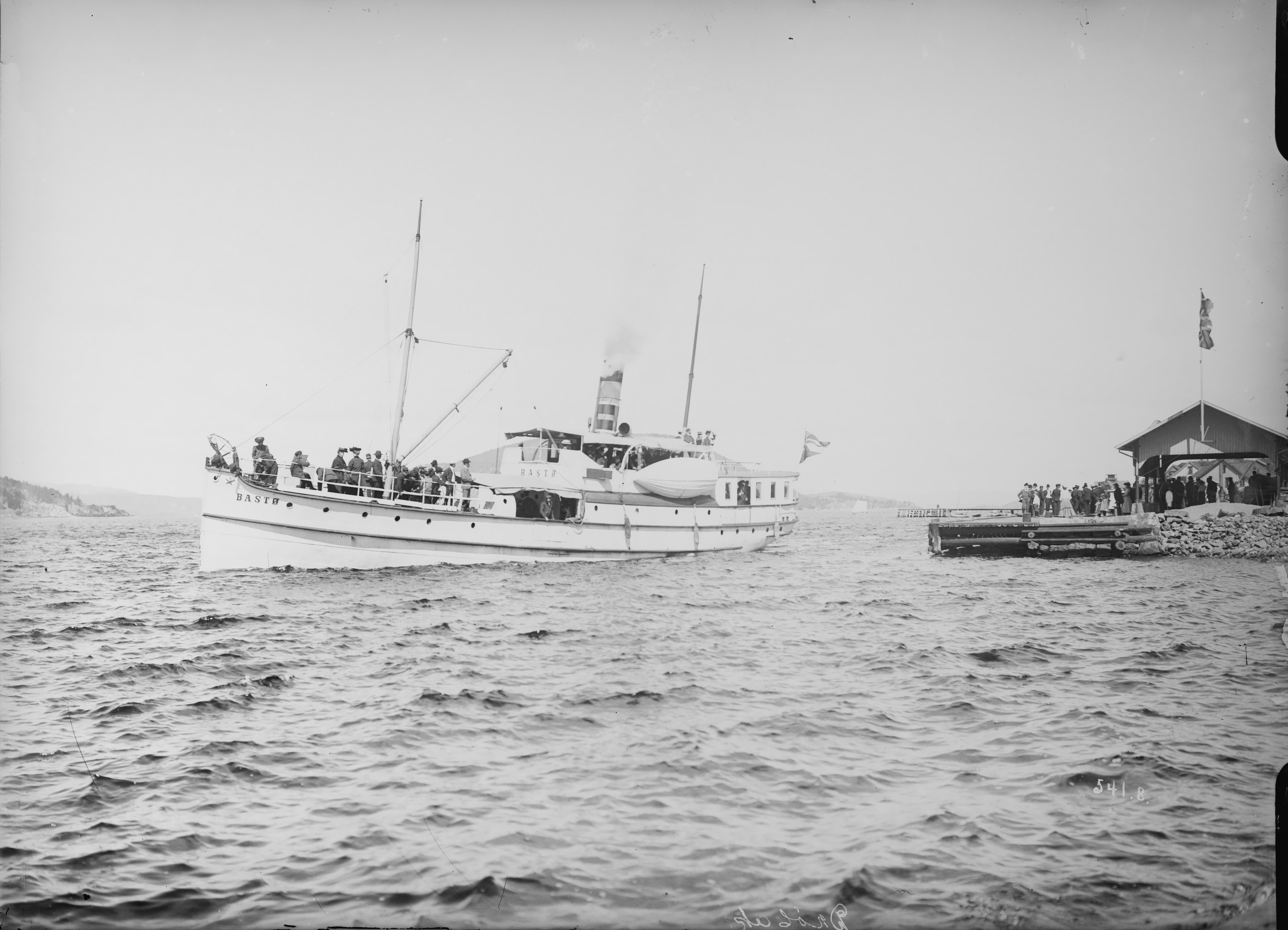
DS Bastø departing Drøbak

Peterson bought the larger ferry DS Bastø II in 1900. It could carry 260 passengers and, at least in theory, could hoist two cars into its hold. Bastø II was put into the Moss–Horten crossing, while Bastø I was put into service between Moss and Kristiania (today Oslo). This route was in direct competition with Moss' other major shipping line, Alpha.

The Moss–Horten route was without competition, and Peterson had experienced broad support for it. However, the service to Kristianai was competing with Alpha, a company with broad ownership throughout the town. Many affluent people held shares in Alpha, and did not like Peterson taking up competition, which could reduce profits for Alpha. The discomfort of this situation, combined with his growing age, made Peterson suggest a sale of Moss–Horten Dampskibsselskab to Alpha. A proposal was made on 9 December 1910, and it was accepted by Alpha's board ten days later. Alpha took over the operations of the Moss–Horten Ferry.

== Bibliography ==
- Ringdal, Niels Johan (1994). Moss bys historie: Perioden 1880–1990 (PDF) (in Norwegian). Moss: Moss Municipality.
- Ryggvik, Helge; Søilen, Espen (1992). Bastøfergen: Fra damplekter til brikke i pengespillet (in Norwegian). Sandefjord: Gokstad.
- Schulstad, Per (1967). Aktieselskapet Alpha gjennom 75 år (in Norwegian). Moss.
