= Brynjulf Skaugen Sr. =

Norwegian businessman (1918–2002)

Brynjulf Skaugen Sr. (11 June 1918 – 14 August 2002) was a Norwegian business executive.

He was born 11 June 1918, the son of Isak Martinius Skaugen, He took his examen artium, which qualified him for admission to university studies. He became a sailor and then took an examination as an average adjuster.

He worked for his father's company, I. M. Skaugen. He became a partner in 1952 together with his brothers, Sigurd (who died in 1975) and Morits. The brothers later gained control of the family company. For about twenty years from 1969 they also co-owned Royal Caribbean Cruise Line. In 1990, the I. M. Skaugen firm was taken over by Morits Skaugen Jr., and a new branch named B. Skaugen was taken over by Brynjulf Skaugen Jr. The heirs of Brynjulf Skaugen Sr., were Brynjulf Jr; Severin, Marius, and Anette Skaugen, who inherited 746.5 million kroner.

In 1983 Skaugen was decorated as a commander of the Order of the Lion of Finland. He died in August 2002 and was buried in Ris.
