= Anette Gleichmann =

Norwegian investor and publisher

Anette Gleichmann, née Skaugen (born 1964) is a Norwegian investor and publisher.

She is a part of a large shipping family, as a daughter of Brynjulf Skaugen, Sr. She changed her surname after marrying Swede Gabi Gleichmann.

In 2010 she and her husband started the publishing house Agora Publishing to publish translations of world literature hitherto untranslated to Norwegian.
