= Frithjof Bettum =

Norwegian jurist and politician

Frithjof Bettum (13 May 1900 – 20 September 1984) was a Norwegian jurist and politician for the Conservative Party.

He was born in Sandar Municipality, and was the father of Bjørn Bettum. He was elected to the Norwegian Parliament from Vestfold in 1945, but was not re-elected. He later served in the position of deputy representative during the term 1950–1953.

Bettum was a member of the municipal council of Sandar Municipality from 1928 to 1937 and 1945 to 1955, serving as deputy mayor in 1931–1934.

Bettum was one of three partners of Anders Jahres Rederi from 1928 to 1969 and chairman of the trustees of Anders Jahres Humanitære Stiftelse from 1966 to 1978.
