= Isak Martinius Skaugen =

Norwegian businessman

Isak Martinius Skaugen (17 August 1875 – 26 December 1962), was a Norwegian businessperson.

He was a sea captain by profession. In 1916 in Risør he founded the shipping company which still exists under the name I. M. Skaugen. His sons Sigurd, Brynjulf and Morits were taken on board as partners in 1952, and the brothers (Sigurd died in 1975) later controlled the company. The company was passed on to the third generation represented by Morits Skaugen, Jr. and Brynjulf Skaugen, Jr., and split in two, in 1990.

The Norwegian Society for Sea Rescue vessel RS Kaptein Skaugen was named after Isak Martinius Skaugen, and given to the Society by Morits and Brynjulf Skaugen.
