= Bjørn Bettum =

Norwegian businessman

- Born: 2 November 1935; Sandar Municipality, Norway
- Died: 16 March 2002 (aged 66); Sandefjord Municipality, Norway
- Education: cand.jur. (University of Oslo)
- Occupation: Businessperson
- Spouse: Berit Bettum
- Parent: Frithjof Bettum (father)

Bjørn Bettum (2 November 1935 – 16 March 2002) was a Norwegian businessperson and lawyer. He was partner with shipping magnate Anders Jahre from 1970 to 1984, and CEO of Kosmos from 1978 to 1989.

== Early and personal life ==
He was born in and grew up in Sandar Municipality in Vestfold county, Norway, as son of Frithjof Bettum. He took a law degree (cand.jur.) at the University of Oslo. He was married to Berit Bettum. After studies, Bettum moved to London, where worked for the bank Lazard.

== Jahre and Kosmos ==
He returned to Sandefjord in 1969 to work for Anders Jahre and his company Kosmos. Bjørn's father was one of the partners in the company Anders Jahre, a position Bjørn Bettum took over in 1970 and retained until 1984. Bettum was CEO of Kosmos from 1978 to 1989.

== Gokstad ==
After I. M. Skaugen took over Kosmos in 1989, Bettum resigned as CEO. Through a management buy-out, he secured control of the Moss–Horten Ferry through the operating company Gokstad. This was a profitable venture until the end of 1995, when the company lost its concession and had to close down.

Bettum died of cancer on 13 March 2002, aged 66.

== Bibliography ==
- Boye, Tore (2005). Anders Jahres pengebinge (in Norwegian). Baltic Business Development. ISBN 82-996932-0-9.
- Hansen, Finn R. (2001). Selskapet og dets fartøyer: Fosen Trafikklag ASA (in Norwegian).
