= Saltery Bay Provincial Park =

Canadian provincial park

- IUCN category II (national park)
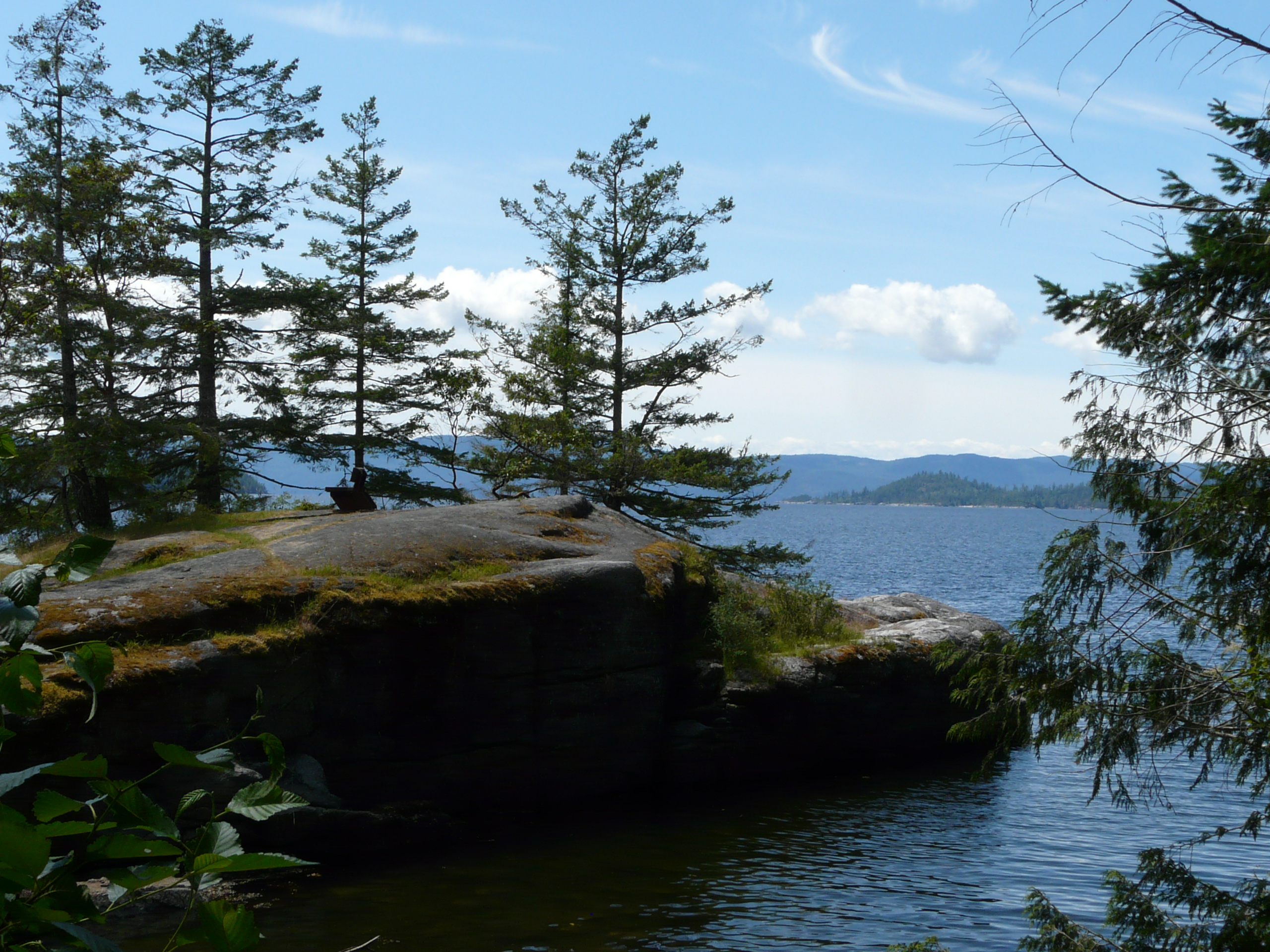
- Panoramic view

- Location within Vancouver Island Location within British Columbia
- Interactive map of Saltery Bay Provincial Park
- Location: British Columbia, Canada
- Nearest city: Powell River
- Coordinates: 49°46′55″N 124°11′34″W
- Area: 0.69 km^{2} (0.27 sq mi)
- Established: December 4, 1962
- Governing body: BC Parks

Saltery Bay Provincial Park is a provincial park in British Columbia, Canada. The park is located southeast of the city of Powell River, and on the north side of the entrance to Jervis Inlet in the central area of the province's Sunshine Coast region.
