= Morits Skaugen =

Norwegian yacht racer

Morits Skaugen Sr. (27 June 1920 – 17 January 2005) was a Norwegian yacht racer and businessperson.

He was born in Risør, but as a sailor he represented the Royal Norwegian Yacht Club in Oslo. He competed as a sailor in the Summer Olympics in 1948, 1952 and 1964.

Skaugen was a son of Isak Martinius Skaugen, and worked for his father's company I. M. Skaugen from 1947. Together with his brothers Sigurd and Brynjulf he was taken on board as partners in 1952, and the brothers later controlled the family company. For about twenty years they also co-owned Royal Caribbean Cruise Line. He retired in 1990. In that year, I. M. Skaugen was taken over by Morits Skaugen Jr., and a branch named B. Skaugen was taken over by Brynjulf Skaugen Jr.

During the Second World War he was a member of the resistance movement in Norway from 1940 to 1943, then worked out of Stockholm at Sambandskontoret from 1943 to 1945, then for Nortraship in London from 1945 to 1947. He co-founded and chaired Institutt for Forsvarsopplysning. In 1983 he was decorated as a Commander of the Order of the Lion of Finland. The Norwegian Society for Sea Rescue vessel RS Kaptein Skaugen was named after Morits Skaugen's father, but given to the Society by Morits and Brynjulf Skaugen. He died in January 2005 in Oslo.
