= Pipervika =

Neighborhood in Sentrum, Norway

Coordinates: 59.9089°N 10.7346°E

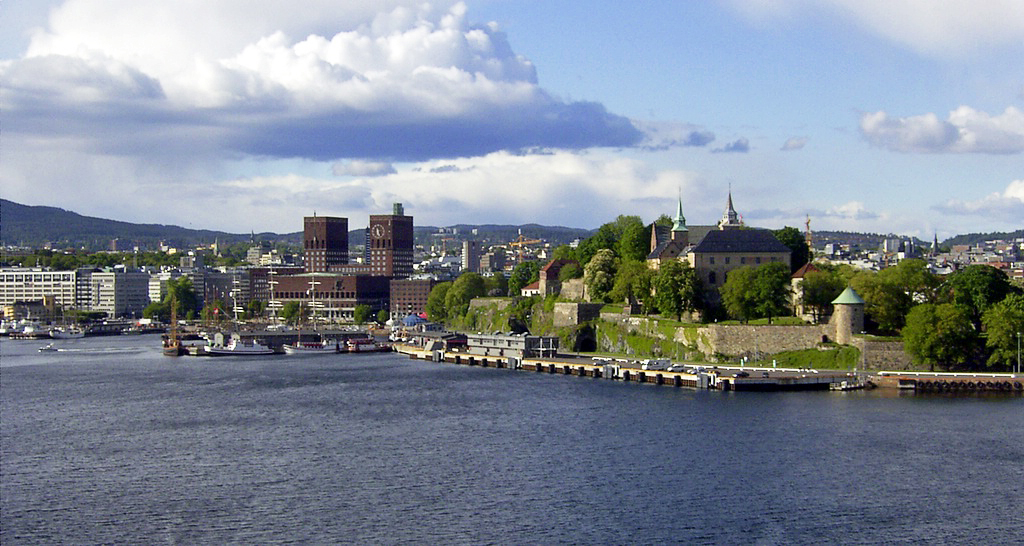

Pipervika is a neighborhood in the borough Sentrum in Oslo, Norway. It is located between the Oslofjord, Akershus Fortress and The City Hall Square. Today the term Pipervika is primarily used for the bay between the fortress and Aker Brygge. This was formerly commonly known as Piperviksbukta. It is part of the Fjord City urban renewal project.

== The name ==
The first element is assumed to refer to the brigade music's pipers (flutists) who were located in the area, the last element is the finite form of vik f 'bay, inlet'. But the Norse name of the bay was Gyljandi, and this name is derived from the verb gylja 'howl, huut' (probably referring to the windy conditions in the bay). The name Pipervika ('the piping bay') could therefore be some kind of translation from Norse to Danish in the 17th century. (The verb pipe in Scandinavian in often used to describe the sound of strong wind.)

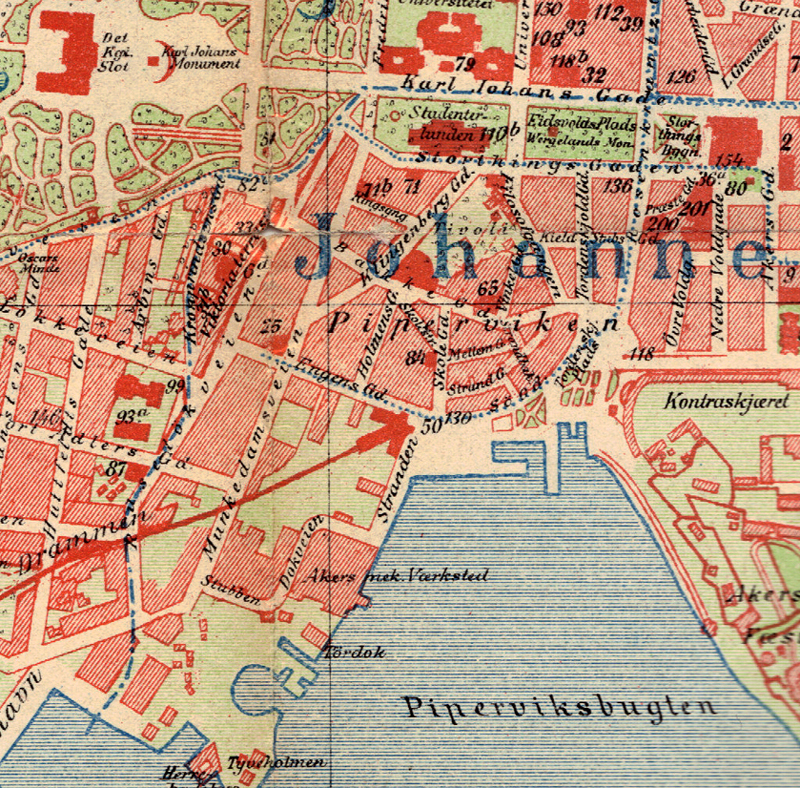
Pipervika about 1900
