= Nils Johan Ringdal =

Norwegian author and historian

- Born: 6 March 1952; Norway
- Died: 11 September 2008 (aged 56); Denpasar, Indonesia
- Occupations: Author, historian, bodybuilder and judoka
- Partner: Georg Petersen (b. 1947)
- Writing career
- Period: 1970s–2008
- Notable work: Nationaltheatrets historie 1899-1999

Nils Johan Ringdal (6 March 1952 – 11 September 2008) was a Norwegian author and historian, known mostly for his works on Norwegian occupation history and Norwegian cultural history, and for his controversial book "Nationaltheaterets Historie 1899-1999" (The History of the National Theater 1899-1999). Ringdal had been living in various countries in Southeast Asia since 1988, along with his domestic partner Georg Petersen. Ringdal was found dead on 11 September 2008 in Denpasar, Indonesia.
