= Akers mekaniske Verksted =

Former Norwegian shipyard and engineering company

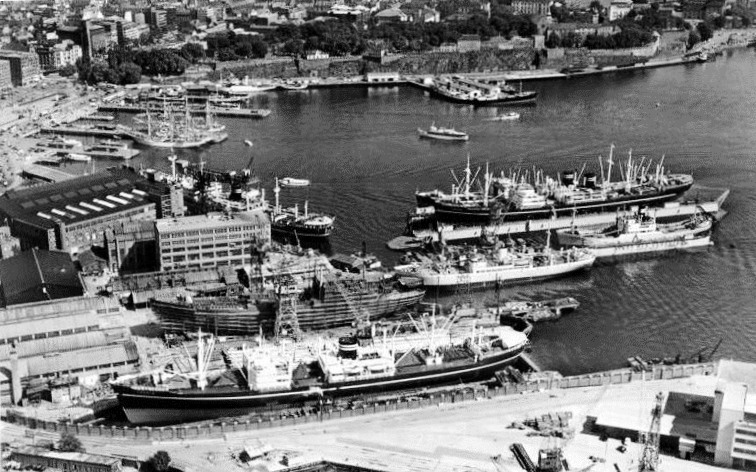
- Akers mekaniske Verksted in 1957
- Formerly: Agers mechaniske Værksted; Akers Verft; Nyland Vest; Nylands Verksted
- Type: Aksjeselskap
- Industry: Shipbuilding, mechanical engineering
- Founded: 1841
- Defunct: 1982
- Fate: Shipyard closed; holding company continues as Aker ASA
- Headquarters: Pipervika, Oslo, Norway
- Key people: Peter Severin Steenstrup, Fred. Olsen, Martin Siem
- Products: Steamships, whalers, motor ships, oil platforms

Akers mekaniske Verksted (Norwegian for "Aker Mechanical Workshop"; often abbreviated Akers mek. Verksted) was an industrial company in Oslo, Norway. It was established by the Aker River in 1841 and moved in 1854 to Holmen in Pipervika, where Aker Brygge stands today. For a long time the workshop was one of Oslo's leading industrial companies and a major player in shipbuilding and, in time, the offshore industry in Norway.

In the 1950s Akers mekaniske Verksted took over several other companies, which in 1960 were gathered under the name Akergruppen. Akers mekaniske Verksted (Aker AS from 1987) became the name of the controlling holding company, while the shipyard in Vika was named Akers Verft from 1959. The shipyard closed in 1982, while the holding company lives on in today's Aker ASA.

== History ==
=== Beginnings ===
Akers mekaniske Verksted, established under the name Agers mechaniske Værksted, was founded in 1841. Operations began in 1842 in a small timber-framed building, preserved at Øvre Foss on the east side of the Aker River, then in the rural municipality of Aker, from which the company took its name. Production in the early years included small steam engines, turbines, syringes, pumps, and building parts such as fittings, columns, railings, and lamp holders. The workshop was part of the capital's entrepreneurial scene of the 1840s and 1850s, in which people of varied backgrounds founded a range of new factories and enterprises.

The naval captain Peter Severin Steenstrup initiated the workshop and was its first director. He was from Kongsberg but also part of the Collett family of Christiania, and as a naval officer and captain of Norway's first steamship, Constitutionen, he was a typical representative of the official class and the established bourgeoisie. He had also helped build up the Navy's main yard in Horten, which had taken Norway's first stationary steam engine into use in 1840. He led the expansion of the business until his death in 1863 and was also a co-founder of the Polytechnic Society in 1852.

=== Move to Pipervika ===
In its first decades Akers mekaniske Verksted developed gradually from a modest start. In 1854 it bought Holmen in Pipervika, a major move that in time turned the workshop into a modern shipyard for building and repairing steel ships with steam engines. Building number 1 was D/S Færdesmanden in 1855, intended for service on Mjøsa. By 1872 Akers mekaniske Verksted had built over 40 of around 200 registered Norwegian steamships, most of them small passenger and cargo ships for canal, lake, and coastal traffic. A surviving example is building number 35, D/S Bjoren, originally a 16-meter steamship that ran on the Kilefjord in Agder.

The number of employees varied in these years between 130 and 250, depending on the order situation. An expansion of capacity with a dry dock secured steadier operation by alternating between new building and repair. Steenstrup's successor, Ulrik August Sinding (1822–1892), also tried to expand deliveries to include machinery for the paper and wood-processing industry, and a paper machine was delivered to Bentse Brug, but this did not become a lasting venture.

=== Whaling ===
In 1868 Akers mek. delivered its first whaling vessel to Svend Foyn. Small whalers became an important specialty, and 184 of them were built in all, with as many as 38 delivered during the three peak years of 1911–1913. The yard area was steadily expanded toward Tjuvholmen, with new slipways and the enlargement of docks, including a floating dock and a large dry dock in 1920 that can still be seen at Aker Brygge. New large workshop halls were built and welding and compressed-air tools gradually introduced, along with large cranes that could lift larger sections between halls and slipways.

=== Union organizing ===
The number of employees passed 900 toward 1920. The many different craft and skilled-worker groups at the yard had organized in various unions, but from 1902 they joined together in a common workshop club under the Norwegian Iron and Metalworkers' Union. The workers could now elect their own representatives rather than being represented by foremen appointed by management. The workshop club at Aker gained great influence over its own working conditions and pay system, both through conflict and through good cooperation with management, the aim being to secure stability and the workers' rightful share of the yard's economic growth.

An important reason for the growth was that the director from 1907, the engineer Johan Gotfred Lie (1856–1938), succeeded in 1912 in arranging a license to produce diesel engines from the Danish Burmeister & Wain (B&W). The first motor ship with a B&W engine from Akers mek., M/S Brazil of 4,370 gross register tons and 91 meters in length, was delivered in 1914.

=== Fred. Olsen's yard ===
In 1917 the shipowner Thomas Fredrik Olsen (Fred. Olsen, 1857–1933) took over the share majority in Akers mekaniske Verksted and became a strong force in the company's development. His shipping line also became a main customer that secured orders even in generally poor times, as in the 1920s, and the Fred. Olsen family controlled Aker until 1985.

The workforce varied with the volume of work and amounted to nearly 1,500 in 1929. By the outbreak of the Second World War it had risen to 2,300. Expansions, including a new floating dock with large capacity for repair and maintenance, had stabilized the finances, and demand for new ships picked up from 1935. Fred. Olsen remained a main customer, with a number of larger cargo ships for liner service and the two England boats M/S Black Prince and M/S Black Watch, delivered in 1938. These were regarded as high points in ship design and comfort, with interiors by André Peters, decorations by Henrik Finne and Kai Fjell among others, and furniture, fabrics, and carpets that represented the best of Norwegian craft and industry. Both were lost during the Second World War.

=== Second World War ===
The war and occupation years had major consequences for the yard, with a halt in new building and reduced staffing. The German occupiers also took over the repair capacity, which led to several sabotage actions by both the Oslo Gang and the Pelle Group, sinking and damaging a number of ships as well as the workshop's facilities. In the first postwar years the workshop was repaired and made ready to contribute to the necessary rebuilding of the Norwegian merchant fleet, which had suffered great losses and wear during the war.

=== Modernization of production ===
After 1950 Norwegian yards underwent extensive modernization. Earlier, work had been marked by British production ideals of craft-based "tailoring," in which skilled workers were central to the production process while engineers worked mainly on construction. Ships were built at the same yard from the keel up, first on the slipway, then launched and brought to the fitting-out quay for completion with machinery, interiors, piping, and electrical systems, with the yard's various trade groups each responsible for their own priced tasks in a piece-rate pay system.

The new direction in the yard industry was inspired by Henry Ford's mass production of cars and Frederick Taylor's principles of rationalization, which entailed greater demands for planning, organization, and control. The yards prioritized modular building of ships in sections, in which a gradual shift to welding as the joining method, instead of traditional riveting, was also important. The change brought a considerable increase in the engineers' influence at the yards, and new departments for planning, calculation, and work studies were set up; between 1948 and 1968 the number of salaried staff doubled while the number of workers remained unchanged. Aker was also early in replacing the piece-rate pay system with a fixed-wage system better suited to the new production method, an agreement worked out between Aker's director through the 1950s and 1960s, Martin Siem, and the unions, including the longtime club leader Ragnar Kalheim.

=== The Aker group ===
The standardization and streamlining of shipbuilding made way for mass production, which made it possible to meet the need for ever-larger cargo and tank ships while opening a new kind of organization in which larger hulls could be built at one yard and fitting-out and completion at another, with parts of hulls or other modules, engines, and machine parts placed with subcontractors.

For Akers mekaniske Verksted the change meant a large organizational shift into a nationwide group. By 1965 Akergruppen had been established, with the old Akers mek. as Akers Verft together with Nylands Verksted in Oslo, while Stord Verft and Tangen Verft in Kragerø were set up as steady suppliers of large hulls for tank and cargo ships of increasing size. In the 1960s and 1970s Akergruppen was one of the world's leading shipbuilders, and large oil tankers were built at Akers mek. and Stord Verft, among others for the shipowner Hilmar Reksten in Bergen. Bergens Mekaniske Verksteder (BMV) and Trondhjems mekaniske Værksted (TMV) were taken over for building smaller cargo, passenger, and fishing vessels, so that the last four Hurtigruten ships of the 1960s and two of the three new ones of the 1980s were delivered from Aker yards.

The Oslo yards at Pipervika and Bjørvika were combined in 1967 and named Nyland Vest and Nyland Øst. After the closure of Nyland Øst in 1971, Nyland Vest, the old Akers mek., was named Nylands Verksted. Akergruppen was reorganized for deliveries to the oil industry, designing and building drilling and production platforms and other structures for the oil and gas industry. New companies such as Aker Drilling and Aker Engineering were set up, and Aker took stakes in a number of other companies oriented toward the emerging oil industry. The first Norwegian drilling rig, Ocean Viking, was delivered from Akers Verft in 1967, and Akergruppen went on to build many of its own H-3 platforms and later concrete Condeep platforms at Aker Stord and Aker Verdal, the latter established in 1971.

=== Winding down of the yard ===
The space-demanding production of large ships and oil installations made it necessary to establish production units outside Oslo, while demand for ships fell. The state-appointed Ulveseth committee concluded in 1978 that there was overcapacity in shipbuilding and proposed reducing the number of workers in this part of the workshop industry from 20,000 to 14,000. A yard located in the middle of Oslo was especially exposed, as it was easier for those who lost their jobs there to find new work and the central site was needed for other urban uses. All new building at the yard stopped in 1978. The last ship built in Oslo was the container ship M/S Norwegian Crusader, launched on 15 September 1978 and delivered in December; tellingly, it was built to a design from Vaagen Verft in Trøndelag, as Aker's ship engineers had by then concentrated on oil installations. After a wind-down of maintenance and repair, the sale of the engine factory to Horten Verft, and the transfer of tasks, there were barely 100 employees at the yard in 1980.

=== Establishment of Aker Brygge ===
In 1982 the old Akers mek. was closed, and work began to develop the area into Aker Brygge. The production premises of what was then called Nylands Verksted were rebuilt or demolished and replaced with office and commercial buildings by the sea, while the inner areas were developed with housing. Aker Brygge was officially opened in 1986, with commercial premises, restaurants, shops, and homes, among other things. The machine workshop from 1914 with an addition from 1948, the diesel-engine workshop from 1930 facing the quay, two older workshop buildings in the rear areas, and the large dry dock from 1920 are preserved and reused.
