= Morits Skaugen Jr. =

Norwegian businessperson (born 1955)

Morits Skaugen Jr. (born 17 December 1955) is a Norwegian businessperson.

In 1988 his father and uncle managed to buy the company A/S Kosmos and merge it into their family company Eikland. Skaugen received control over the family company I. M. Skaugen in 1990, whereas his cousin Brynjulf Skaugen Jr. was given control over a new branch named B. Skaugen. He is now the CEO of I. M. Skaugen.

He is married to Grace Reksten Skaugen. Relatives include Isak Martinius Skaugen, Morits Skaugen and Brynjulf Skaugen, Sr.

Skaugen has supplied money for the Conservative Party.
