= Kosmos (company) =

Shipping company

A/S Kosmos was a shipping and industrial company from Sandefjord.

It was founded in 1928 by Anders Jahre, Svend Foyn Bruun, Sr. and Anton Barth von der Lippe as Hvalfangstselskapet Kosmos A/S. In 1949 Hvalfangstselskapet Kosmos A/S (A/S Kosmos) and its sister company Hvalfangstselskapet Kosmos II A/S (A/S Kosmos II) were fused to make the company A/S Kosmos.

In 1986, the brothers Arne and Wilhelm Blystad sought to take control of the company, without luck. Two other brothers, Morits and Brynjulf Skaugen, Jr., took control of Kosmos two years later, and split up the company. The shipping arm of the company was taken over by I. M. Skaugen and Color Line.

From 1978 to 1989, Bjørn Bettum was the administrative director of Kosmos.

== See also ==
- FLK Kosmos, whaling ship
- FLK Kosmos II, whaling ship
