= I. M. Skaugen =

Gas shipping company

I.M. Skaugen SE
- Type: Public (OSE: IMSK)
- Industry: Shipping
- Founded: 1916
- Defunct: 2018
- Headquarters: Oslo, Norway
- Area served: Global
- Key people: Morits Skaugen jr. (CEO)
- Website: www.skaugen.com

I.M. Skaugen (OSE: IMSK) or IMS was a shipping company that operates within petrochemical gases and liquefied petroleum gas (LPG) and lightering of crude oil and liquefied natural gas (LNG). IMS was horizontal integrated and designed, built, owned and operated its fleet of vessels. The company also owned Norgas and Skaugen PetroTrans.

== History ==
The company dated back to 1916 when Isak Martinius Skaugen founded D/S-A/S Eikland. After World War II Skaugen and Sven Salén founded the joint venture Salen-Skaugen Line that offered passenger and cargo liner service from the East Coast of the United States to the Middle East. In the 1960s Skaugen entered the Norwegian Bulk Carrier Pool and during the 1970s the company co-founded Royal Caribbean Cruise Line. 1982 saw the founding of Norwegian Gas Carriers along with four other shipping companies. In 1988 the company sold its partial ownership in Royal Caribbean Cruise Line and bought the conglomerate Kosmos. Two years later the company was listed on the Oslo Stock Exchange, when it merged with Laboremus and Kosmos Shipping. The shuttle tanker operation, Jahre Shipping, was spun off as Skaugen PetroTrans in October 1991.

== Bankruptcy ==
In 2018, as part of a refinancing effort, the company was taken off the stock exchange and also changed its name to IMSK SE. In September, the company announced it was winding down and liquidating. Skaugen had lost an important partner and had to look for additional financing, but after months of negotiation refinancing failed. The company entered bankruptcy that October. As of February 2025, the bankruptcy estate of IMSK has not been fully settled.
