= Re Municipality =

Former municipality in Norway

Re Municipality Re kommune
- Former municipality
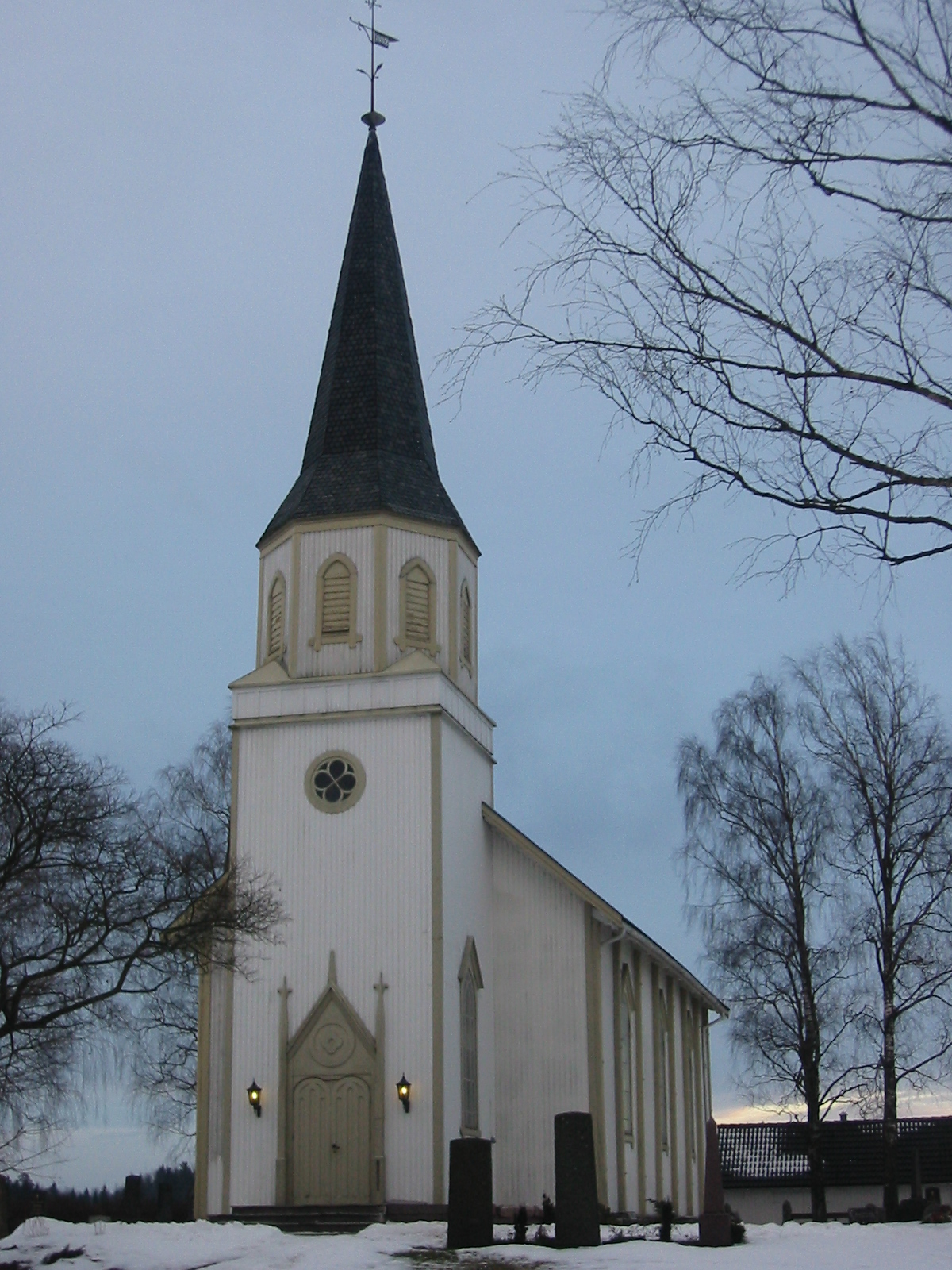
- View of the local Undrumsdal Church

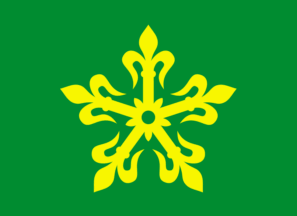
- Flag Coat of arms

- Vestfold within Norway

- Re within Vestfold
- Coordinates: 59°25′8″N 10°17′10″E
- Country: Norway
- County: Vestfold
- District: Jarlsberg
- Established: 1 Jan 2002
  - Preceded by: Ramnes Municipality and Våle Municipality
- Disestablished: 1 Jan 2020
  - Succeeded by: Tønsberg Municipality
- Administrative centre: Revetal

Government
  - Mayor (2002–2020): Thorvald Hillestad (Sp)

Area (upon dissolution)
  - Total: 224.66 km^{2} (86.74 sq mi)
  - Land: 222.37 km^{2} (85.86 sq mi)
  - Water: 2.29 km^{2} (0.88 sq mi) 1%
  - Rank: #319 in Norway
- Highest elevation (Snippane): 399.97 m (1,312.2 ft)

Population (2019)
  - Total: 9,730
  - Rank: #118 in Norway
  - Density: 43.8/km^{2} (113/sq mi)
  - Change (10 years): ▲ +14.1%
- Demonym: Re-folk

Official language
  - Norwegian form: Bokmål
- Time zone: UTC+01:00 (CET)
  - Summer (DST): UTC+02:00 (CEST)
- ISO 3166 code: NO-0716

Re (Norwegian pronunciation: [reː]; locally [ræː]) is a former municipality in Vestfold county, Norway. The 224.66-square-kilometre (86.74 sq mi) municipality existed from 2002 until its dissolution in 2020. The area is now part of Tønsberg Municipality in the traditional district of Jarlsberg. The administrative centre was the village of Revetal. Other villages in the municipality included Ramnes, Brekkeåsen, Bergsåsen, Gretteåsen, Undrumsdal, Fon, Vivestad.

Prior to its dissolution in 2020, the 224.66-square-kilometre (86.74 sq mi) municipality was the 319th largest by area out of the 422 municipalities in Norway. Re Municipality was the 118th most populous municipality in Norway with a population of about 9,730. The municipality's population density was 43.8 inhabitants per square kilometre (113/sq mi) and its population had increased by 14.1% over the previous 10-year period.

== General information ==
=== Administrative history ===
The municipality of Re was established on 1 January 2002 when Våle Municipality (population: 4,248) and Ramnes Municipality (population: 3,790) were merged to form the new Re Municipality.

In 2020, there were many municipal and county mergers across Norway due to the work of the Solberg cabinet. On 1 January 2020, Re Municipality was dissolved and new borders were drawn for the three neighboring municipalities of Horten, Tønsberg, and Holmestrand:

- the 691-decare (171-acre) area that is on the northeast coast Re Municipality, including the island of Langøya, was transferred into Holmestrand Municipality
- the 128-decare (32-acre) Haugan area was transferred from Horten Municipality to Re Municipality
- the 388-decare (96-acre) Nykirke/Pauliveien area was transferred from Re Municipality to Horten Municipality
- the 318-decare (79-acre) west Skoppum area was transferred from Re Municipality to Horten Municipality (creating a small exclave for the Råen farm inside Horten Municipality)
- all the remaining portions of Re Municipality were merged into Tønsberg Municipality

=== Name ===
The municipality is named after an old name for the district, Re (Old Norse: Ré). The name is related to the old German word reihe which means "line" or "row", referring to the local geological formation called Raet.

=== Coat of arms ===
The coat of arms was granted on 31 August 2001 in preparation for the establishment of the new municipality on 1 January 2002. It was determined by a public competition and a public vote among inhabitants of the new municipality. The official blazon is "Vert, an escarbuncle Or" (Norwegian: I grønt en gul liljehaspel). This means the arms have a green field (background) and the charge is a five-pointed escarbuncle. The charge has a tincture of Or which means it is commonly colored yellow, but if it is made out of metal, then gold is used. The green color in the field symbolizes the importance of nature and agriculture. The five-pointed design has a long history in the area and it symbolizes unity and to point back in time to the historic battles fought at Re. The five points represent the five parishes within Re. The arms were designed by Arvid Steen. The municipal flag has the same design as the coat of arms.

=== Churches ===
The Church of Norway had five parishes (sokn) within Re Municipality. It was part of the Nord-Jarlsberg prosti (deanery) in the Diocese of Tunsberg.

Churches in Re Municipality
Parish (sokn)	Church name	Location of the church	Year built
Fon	Fon Church	Fon	c. 1100
Ramnes	Ramnes Church	Ramnes	c. 1100
Undrumsdal	Undrumsdal Church	Undrumsdal	1882
Vivestad	Vivestad Church	Vivestad	1914
Våle	Våle Church	Bergsåsen	c. 1100

== Geography ==
The river Aulielva ran through the municipality. The highest point in the municipality was the 399.97-metre (1,312.2 ft) tall mountain Snippane, located on the western border with Lardal Municipality, about 3 kilometres (1.9 mi) south of the village of Hof.

Holmestrand Municipality was located to the north, Horten Municipality was located to the east, Tønsberg Municipality was located to the southeast, Sandefjord Municipality was located to the south, Larvik Municipality was located to the west.

== History ==
In this area a battle took place in 1177, which is the last one mentioned in Heimskringla by Snorri Sturluson. Graves and other findings from the Viking Age and even earlier can be found throughout the district.

== Government ==
While it existed, Re Municipality was responsible for primary education (through 10th grade), outpatient health services, senior citizen services, welfare and other social services, zoning, economic development, and municipal roads and utilities. The municipality was governed by a municipal council of directly elected representatives. The mayor was indirectly elected by a vote of the municipal council. The municipality was under the jurisdiction of the Tønsberg District Court and the Agder Court of Appeal.

=== Municipal council ===
The municipal council (Kommunestyre) of Re Municipality was made up of 25 representatives that were elected to four year terms. The tables below show the historical composition of the council by political party.

Re kommunestyre 2015–2019
Party name (in Norwegian)	Number of representatives
Labour Party (Arbeiderpartiet)	6
Progress Party (Fremskrittspartiet)	4
Green Party (Miljøpartiet De Grønne)	1
Conservative Party (Høyre)	4
Christian Democratic Party (Kristelig Folkeparti)	2
Centre Party (Senterpartiet)	6
Socialist Left Party (Sosialistisk Venstreparti)	1
Liberal Party (Venstre)	1
Total number of members:	25
Note: On 1 January 2020, Re Municipality became part of Tønsberg Municipality.

Re kommunestyre 2011–2015
Party name (in Norwegian)	Number of representatives
Labour Party (Arbeiderpartiet)	4
Progress Party (Fremskrittspartiet)	4
Centre Party (Senterpartiet)	9
Socialist Left Party (Sosialistisk Venstreparti)	1
Liberal Party (Venstre)	1
Joint list of the Conservative Party (Høyre) and Christian Democratic Party (Kristelig Folkeparti)	6
Total number of members:	25

Re kommunestyre 2007–2011
Party name (in Norwegian)	Number of representatives
Labour Party (Arbeiderpartiet)	5
Progress Party (Fremskrittspartiet)	5
Conservative Party (Høyre)	3
Christian Democratic Party (Kristelig Folkeparti)	2
Centre Party (Senterpartiet)	8
Socialist Left Party (Sosialistisk Venstreparti)	1
Liberal Party (Venstre)	1
Total number of members:	25

Re kommunestyre 2003–2007
Party name (in Norwegian)	Number of representatives
Labour Party (Arbeiderpartiet)	4
Progress Party (Fremskrittspartiet)	5
Conservative Party (Høyre)	3
Christian Democratic Party (Kristelig Folkeparti)	3
Centre Party (Senterpartiet)	7
Socialist Left Party (Sosialistisk Venstreparti)	2
Liberal Party (Venstre)	1
Total number of members:	25

=== Mayor ===
The mayor (Norwegian: ordfører) of Re Municipality was the political leader of the municipality and the chairperson of the municipal council. Re Municipality only had one mayor during its existence: Thorvald Hillestad from the Centre Party. He served from 2002 until its dissolution in 2020. Prior to this, he was the mayor of Våle Municipality for many years.

== See also ==
- List of former municipalities of Norway
