= Ramnes Municipality =

Former municipality in Norway

Ramnes Municipality Ramnes kommune
- Former municipality
- Ramnes herred (historic name)
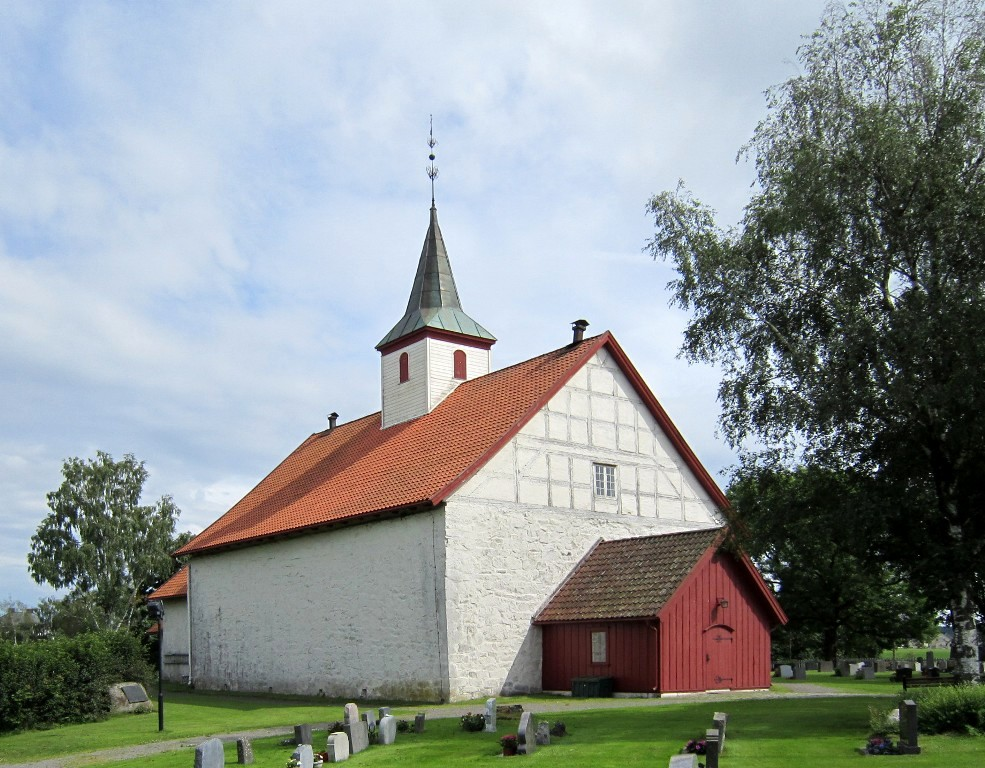
- Historic Ramnes Church

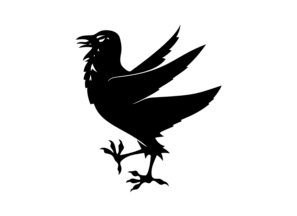
- Flag Coat of arms

- Vestfold within Norway

- Ramnes within Vestfold
- Coordinates: 59°20′50″N 10°15′07″E
- Country: Norway
- County: Vestfold
- District: Jarlsberg
- Established: 1 Jan 1838
  - Created as: Formannskapsdistrikt
- Disestablished: 1 Jan 2002
  - Succeeded by: Re Municipality
- Administrative centre: Ramnes

Government
  - Mayor (1995–2001): Aasta Kari Holm (Sp)

Area (upon dissolution)
  - Total: 139.3 km^{2} (53.8 sq mi)
  - Rank: #366 in Norway
- Highest elevation (Snippane): 399.97 m (1,312.2 ft)

Population (2001)
  - Total: 3,790
  - Rank: #239 in Norway
  - Density: 27.2/km^{2} (70/sq mi)
  - Change (10 years): ▲ +7.9%
- Demonym: Ramnessokning

Official language
  - Norwegian form: Neutral
- Time zone: UTC+01:00 (CET)
  - Summer (DST): UTC+02:00 (CEST)
- ISO 3166 code: NO-0718

Ramnes (Norwegian pronunciation: [ˈrɑ̀mːnəs]; locally [ˈrɑ̀mːnæs]) is a former municipality in Vestfold county, Norway. The 139.3-square-kilometre (53.8 sq mi) municipality existed from 1838 until its dissolution in 2002. The area is now part of Tønsberg Municipality in the traditional district of Jarlsberg. The administrative centre was the village of Ramnes (sometimes called Tingvoll). Other villages in Ramnes included Vivestad, Fon, Bergsåsen, and Linnestad.

Prior to its dissolution in 2002, the 139.3-square-kilometre (53.8 sq mi) municipality was the 366th largest by area out of the 435 municipalities in Norway. Ramnes Municipality was the 239th most populous municipality in Norway with a population of about 3,790. The municipality's population density was 27.2 inhabitants per square kilometre (70/sq mi) and its population had increased by 7.9% over the previous 10-year period.

== General information ==
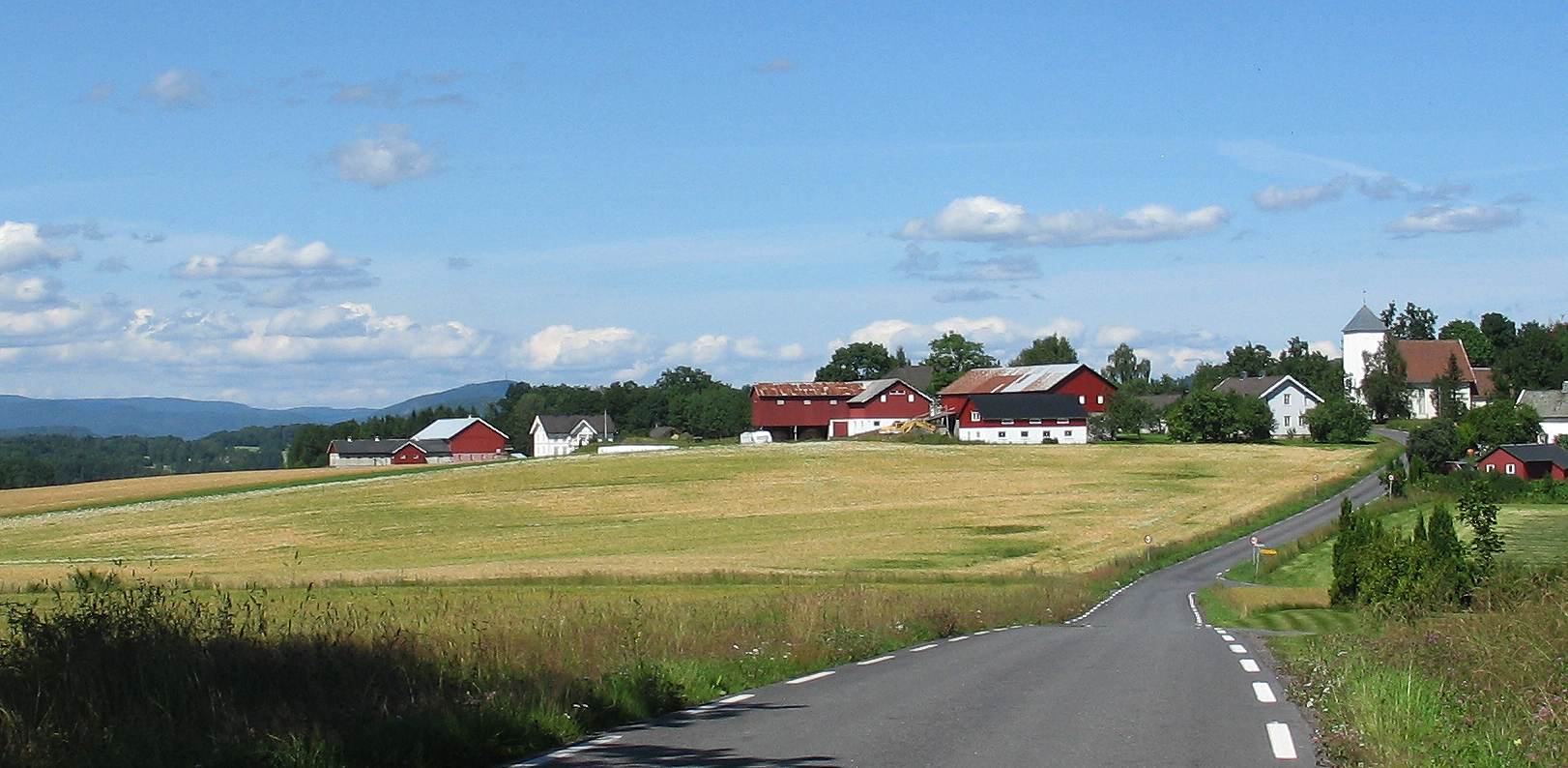
View of the Fon area

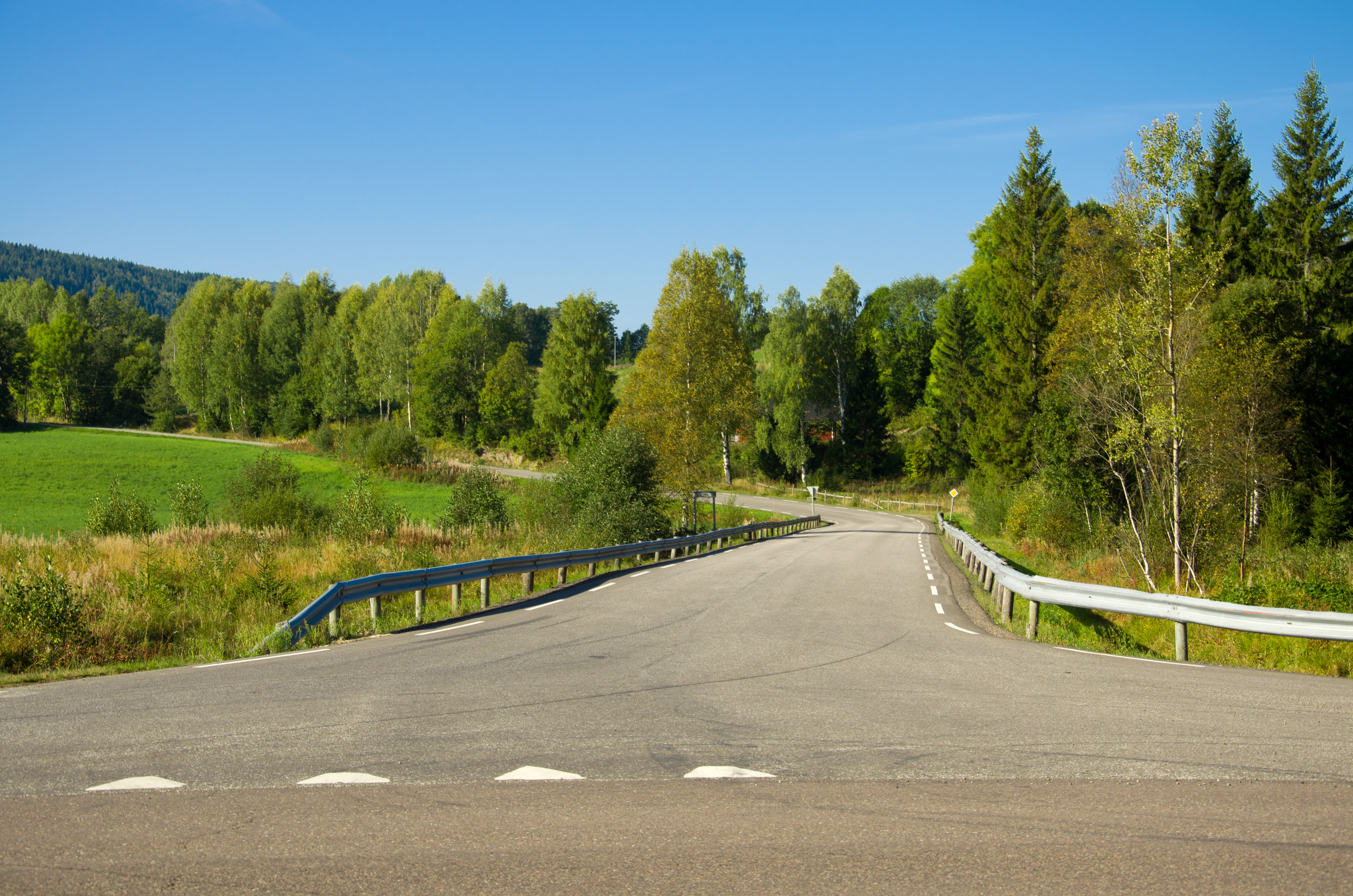
View of northern Ramnes

=== Administrative history ===
The formannskapsdistrikt law of 1837 created a system of local government in Norway by establishing each town (ladested or kjøpstad) and each Church of Norway prestegjeld as a civil municipality. On 1 January 1838, Ramnes prestegjeld was established as Ramnes Municipality. On 16 July 1873, a royal resolution approved transferring an uninhabited area of Vaale Municipality to the neighboring Ramnes Municipality.

On 1 January 2002, Ramnes Municipality (population: 3,790) was merged with the neighboring Våle Municipality (population: 4,248) to form the new Re Municipality. Re Municipality became part of Tønsberg Municipality on 1 January 2020.

=== Name ===
The municipality is named after the old Ramnes prestegjeld. The prestegjeld was named after the old Ramnes farm (Old Norse: Rafnnes) since the first Ramnes Church was built there. The first element is hrafn which means "raven". The last element is nes which means "headland", which is likely referring to the area between two rivers.

=== Coat of arms ===
The coat of arms was granted on 30 January 1976. The official blazon is "Argent, a raven passant wings elevated sable" (Norwegian: I sølv en svart ravn). This means the arms have a field (background) has a tincture of argent which means it is commonly colored white, but if it is made out of metal, then silver is used. The charge is a raven passant with its wings elevated. They are canting arms since the name of the municipality is derived from the word "raven". The arms were designed by Sven Sköld. The municipal flag has the same design as the coat of arms.

=== Churches ===
The Church of Norway had three parishes (sokn) within Ramnes Municipality. It is part of the Nord-Jarlsberg prosti (deanery) in the Diocese of Tunsberg.

Churches in Ramnes Municipality
Parish (sokn)	Church name	Location of the church	Year built
Fon	Fon Church	Fon	c. 1100
Ramnes	Ramnes Church	Ramnes	c. 1100
Vivestad	Vivestad Church	Vivestad	1914

== Geography ==
The landscape of Ramnes Municipality was dominated by the wide valleys of the river Aulielva. Around the village of Ramnes, the valley widens out into a large, cultivated plain known as Ramnessletta. Between the larger and smaller valley which generally went north-south are low, wooded hills. The hills are sparely covered with grass and trees, exposing weathered soil. The valleys are filled with a rich clay that is used for agriculture. The highest point in the municipality was the 399.97-metre (1,312.2 ft) tall mountain Snippane, located on the western border with Lardal Municipality.

Holmestrand Municipality was located to the north, Våle Municipality was located to the east, Tønsberg Municipality was located to the southeast, Stokke Municipality was located to the south, Andebu Municipality was located to the southwest, Lardal Municipality was located to the west, and Hof Municipality was located to the northwest.

== Government ==
While it existed, Ramnes Municipality was responsible for primary education (through 10th grade), outpatient health services, senior citizen services, welfare and other social services, zoning, economic development, and municipal roads and utilities. The municipality was governed by a municipal council of directly elected representatives. The mayor was indirectly elected by a vote of the municipal council. The municipality was under the jurisdiction of the Horten District Court and the Agder Court of Appeal.

=== Municipal council ===
The municipal council (Kommunestyre) of Ramnes Municipality was made up of 25 representatives that were elected to four-year terms. The tables below show the historical composition of the council by political party.

Ramnes kommunestyre 1999–2001
Party name (in Norwegian)	Number of representatives
Labour Party (Arbeiderpartiet)	4
Progress Party (Fremskrittspartiet)	3
Conservative Party (Høyre)	4
Christian Democratic Party (Kristelig Folkeparti)	3
Centre Party (Senterpartiet)	8
Socialist Left Party (Sosialistisk Venstreparti)	2
Liberal Party (Venstre)	1
Total number of members:	25
Note: On 1 January 2002, Ramnes Municipality became part of Re Municipality.

Ramnes kommunestyre 1995–1999
Party name (in Norwegian)	Number of representatives
Labour Party (Arbeiderpartiet)	5
Progress Party (Fremskrittspartiet)	3
Conservative Party (Høyre)	4
Christian Democratic Party (Kristelig Folkeparti)	2
Centre Party (Senterpartiet)	10
Socialist Left Party (Sosialistisk Venstreparti)	1
Total number of members:	25

Ramnes kommunestyre 1991–1995
Party name (in Norwegian)	Number of representatives
Labour Party (Arbeiderpartiet)	4
Progress Party (Fremskrittspartiet)	2
Conservative Party (Høyre)	5
Christian Democratic Party (Kristelig Folkeparti)	2
Centre Party (Senterpartiet)	10
Socialist Left Party (Sosialistisk Venstreparti)	2
Total number of members:	25

Ramnes kommunestyre 1987–1991
Party name (in Norwegian)	Number of representatives
Labour Party (Arbeiderpartiet)	7
Conservative Party (Høyre)	8
Christian Democratic Party (Kristelig Folkeparti)	2
Centre Party (Senterpartiet)	7
Liberal Party (Venstre)	1
Total number of members:	25

Ramnes kommunestyre 1983–1987
Party name (in Norwegian)	Number of representatives
Labour Party (Arbeiderpartiet)	7
Conservative Party (Høyre)	7
Christian Democratic Party (Kristelig Folkeparti)	2
Centre Party (Senterpartiet)	8
Liberal Party (Venstre)	1
Total number of members:	25

Ramnes kommunestyre 1979–1983
Party name (in Norwegian)	Number of representatives
Labour Party (Arbeiderpartiet)	6
Conservative Party (Høyre)	8
Christian Democratic Party (Kristelig Folkeparti)	2
Centre Party (Senterpartiet)	8
Liberal Party (Venstre)	1
Total number of members:	25

Ramnes kommunestyre 1975–1979
Party name (in Norwegian)	Number of representatives
Labour Party (Arbeiderpartiet)	5
Conservative Party (Høyre)	4
Christian Democratic Party (Kristelig Folkeparti)	2
Centre Party (Senterpartiet)	9
Socialist Left Party (Sosialistisk Venstreparti)	1
Total number of members:	21

Ramnes kommunestyre 1971–1975
Party name (in Norwegian)	Number of representatives
Labour Party (Arbeiderpartiet)	7
Conservative Party (Høyre)	3
Christian Democratic Party (Kristelig Folkeparti)	1
Centre Party (Senterpartiet)	10
Total number of members:	21

Ramnes kommunestyre 1967–1971
Party name (in Norwegian)	Number of representatives
Labour Party (Arbeiderpartiet)	8
Conservative Party (Høyre)	4
Centre Party (Senterpartiet)	9
Total number of members:	21

Ramnes kommunestyre 1963–1967
Party name (in Norwegian)	Number of representatives
Labour Party (Arbeiderpartiet)	7
Conservative Party (Høyre)	4
Christian Democratic Party (Kristelig Folkeparti)	1
Centre Party (Senterpartiet)	9
Total number of members:	21

Ramnes herredsstyre 1959–1963
Party name (in Norwegian)	Number of representatives
Labour Party (Arbeiderpartiet)	7
Conservative Party (Høyre)	4
Christian Democratic Party (Kristelig Folkeparti)	1
Centre Party (Senterpartiet)	9
Total number of members:	21

Ramnes herredsstyre 1955–1959
Party name (in Norwegian)	Number of representatives
Labour Party (Arbeiderpartiet)	7
Conservative Party (Høyre)	4
Christian Democratic Party (Kristelig Folkeparti)	1
Farmers' Party (Bondepartiet)	9
Total number of members:	21

Ramnes herredsstyre 1951–1955
Party name (in Norwegian)	Number of representatives
Labour Party (Arbeiderpartiet)	6
Conservative Party (Høyre)	4
Farmers' Party (Bondepartiet)	9
Liberal Party (Venstre)	1
Total number of members:	20

Ramnes herredsstyre 1947–1951
Party name (in Norwegian)	Number of representatives
Labour Party (Arbeiderpartiet)	4
Joint list of the Liberal Party (Venstre) and the Radical People's Party (Radikale Folkepartiet)	1
Joint List(s) of Non-Socialist Parties (Borgerlige Felleslister)	11
Local List(s) (Lokale lister)	4
Total number of members:	20

Ramnes herredsstyre 1945–1947
Party name (in Norwegian)	Number of representatives
Labour Party (Arbeiderpartiet)	6
Joint list of the Liberal Party (Venstre) and the Radical People's Party (Radikale Folkepartiet)	1
Joint List(s) of Non-Socialist Parties (Borgerlige Felleslister)	13
Total number of members:	20

Ramnes herredsstyre 1937–1941*
Party name (in Norwegian)	Number of representatives
Labour Party (Arbeiderpartiet)	5
Liberal Party (Venstre)	2
Joint list of the Conservative Party (Høyre) and the Farmers' Party (Bondepartiet)	7
Joint List(s) of Non-Socialist Parties (Borgerlige Felleslister)	6
Total number of members:	20
Note: Due to the German occupation of Norway during World War II, no elections were held for new municipal councils until after the war ended in 1945.

=== Mayors ===
The mayor (Norwegian: ordfører) of Ramnes Municipality was the political leader of the municipality and the chairperson of the municipal council. The following people have held this position:

- 1838–1839: Tønnes Taralsen
- 1840–1843: Georg Taylor Faye
- 1844–1849: Frederik Ingier
- 1850–1851: Hans Morten Thrane Esmark
- 1852–1855: Hans A. Holdt
- 1856–1863: Hans Moss
- 1864–1865: Jørgen Forum
- 1866–1869: Christen Hansen Ramnæs
- 1870–1877: Ole Larsen Ramnæs
- 1878–1887: Hans Knudsen Horn
- 1888–1893: Karl M. Linnestad
- 1894–1898: Even Flaatten
- 1899–1913: Øystein Gåsland
- 1914–1920: Anders H. Teien
- 1920–1931: Hans Flåtten (Sp)
- 1932–1934: Lars J. Bjune
- 1935–1937: Thorvald O. Vivestad
- 1938–1940: Ole M. Gran (Sp)
- 1945–1945: Ole M. Gran (Sp)
- 1946–1947: Asbjørn Sviland (Sp)
- 1948–1951: Johan Borge (Sp)
- 1952–1967: Lars Melbostad (Sp)
- 1968–1987: Torstein Håland (Sp)
- 1988–1993: Eva Lian (Sp)
- 1993–1995: Johan Christian Haugen (Sp)
- 1995–2001: Aasta Kari Holm (Sp)

== See also ==
- List of former municipalities of Norway
