= Våle Municipality =

Former municipality in Norway

Våle Municipality Våle kommune
- Former municipality
- Våle herred (historic name); Vaale herred (historic name)
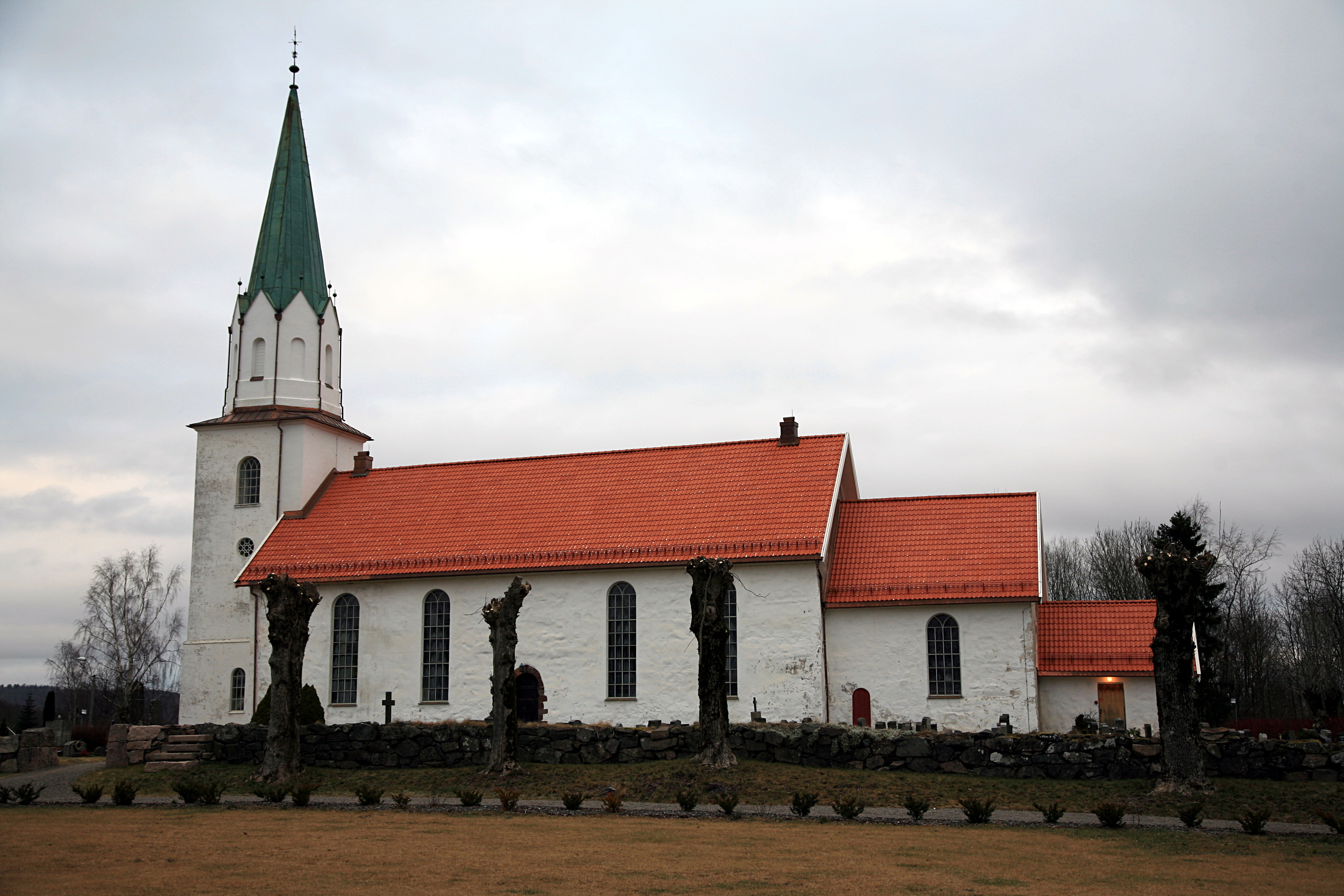
- View of the local Våle Church

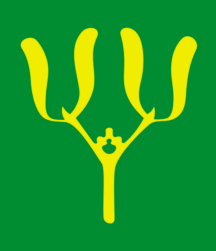
- Flag Coat of arms

- Vestfold within Norway

- Våle within Vestfold
- Coordinates: 59°25′11″N 10°16′36″E
- Country: Norway
- County: Vestfold
- District: Jarlsberg
- Established: 1 Jan 1838
  - Created as: Formannskapsdistrikt
- Disestablished: 1 Jan 2002
  - Succeeded by: Re Municipality
- Administrative centre: Kirkevoll

Government
  - Mayor (1999–2001): Thorvald Hillestad (Sp)

Area (upon dissolution)
  - Total: 85.5 km^{2} (33.0 sq mi)
  - Rank: #397 in Norway
- Highest elevation (Ryksåsen): 218 m (715 ft)

Population (2001)
  - Total: 4,248
  - Rank: #223 in Norway
  - Density: 49.7/km^{2} (129/sq mi)
  - Change (10 years): ▲ +9.3%
- Demonym: Vålesokning

Official language
  - Norwegian form: Bokmål
- Time zone: UTC+01:00 (CET)
  - Summer (DST): UTC+02:00 (CEST)
- ISO 3166 code: NO-0716

Våle (Norwegian pronunciation: [ˈʋoːlə]]; locally [ˈʋoːɽə]) is a former municipality in Vestfold county, Norway. The 85.5-square-kilometre (33.0 sq mi) municipality existed from 1838 until its dissolution in 2002. The area is now part of Tønsberg Municipality in the traditional district of Jarlsberg. The administrative centre was the village of Kirkevoll (it was at Sørby prior to 1990). Other villages in the rural, agricultural municipality included: Brekkeåsen, Rånerudåsen, Svinevoll, Sørby, and Gretteåsen.

Prior to its dissolution in 2002, the 85.5-square-kilometre (33.0 sq mi) municipality was the 397th largest by area out of the 435 municipalities in Norway. Våle Municipality was the 223rd most populous municipality in Norway with a population of about 4,248. The municipality's population density was 49.7 inhabitants per square kilometre (129/sq mi) and its population had increased by 9.3% over the previous 10-year period.

The famous Jarlsberg cheese first was produced in Våle Municipality. The medieval Våle Church was the main church for the municipality.

== General information ==
=== Administrative history ===
The formannskapsdistrikt law of 1837 created a system of local government in Norway by establishing each town (ladested or kjøpstad) and each Church of Norway prestegjeld as a civil municipality. On 1 January 1838, Vaale prestegjeld was established as Vaale Municipality (later spelled Våle). On 16 July 1873, a royal resolution approved transferring an uninhabited area of Vaale Municipality to the neighboring Ramnes Municipality. In 1947, a small area of Botne Municipality (population: 8) was transferred to Våle Municipality.

On 1 January 2002, Våle Municipality (population: 4,248) was merged with the neighboring Ramnes Municipality (population: 3,790) to form the new Re Municipality. Re Municipality became part of Tønsberg Municipality on 1 January 2020.

=== Name ===
The municipality is named after the old Våle prestegjeld. The prestegjeld was named after the old Vaale farm (Old Norse: Válir) since the first Våle Church was built there. The name is the plural form of the word váll which means "clearing in the woods".

On 21 December 1917, a royal resolution enacted the 1917 Norwegian language reforms. Prior to this change, the name was spelled Vaale with the digraph "aa", and after this reform, the name was spelled Våle, using the letter å instead.

=== Coat of arms ===
The coat of arms was granted on 23 February 1990. The official blazon is "Vert, a mistletoe branch Or" (Norwegian: I grønt en gull mistelteinkvist). This means the arms have a green field (background) and the charge is a branch of mistletoe. The charge has a tincture of Or which means it is commonly colored yellow, but if it is made out of metal, then gold is used. The mistletoe plant is very rare in Norway, but can be found in Våle. It is known from Norse mythology because Höðr shot a mistletoe arrow that killed the god Baldr. He was later avenged by his brother Váli (which sounds like Våle). The color green refers to agriculture and forestry. The arms were designed by Stein Davidsen. The municipal flag has the same design as the coat of arms.

=== Churches ===
The Church of Norway had two parishes (sokn) within Våle Municipality. It was part of the Nord-Jarlsberg prosti (deanery) in the Diocese of Tunsberg.

Churches in Våle Municipality
Parish (sokn)	Church name	Location of the church	Year built
Undrumsdal	Undrumsdal Church	Undrumsdal	1882
Våle	Våle Church	Bergsåsen	c. 1100

== Geography ==
The highest point in the municipality was a 218-metre (715 ft) tall point on the slopes of the mountain Ryksåsen located along the northern border. The peak of the mountain was located over the border in the neighboring Holmestrand Municipality. Holmestrand Municipality was located to the north, Horten Municipality was located to the east, Tønsberg Municipality was located to the southeast, and Ramnes Municipality was located to the west.

== Government ==
While it existed, Våle Municipality was responsible for primary education (through 10th grade), outpatient health services, senior citizen services, welfare and other social services, zoning, economic development, and municipal roads and utilities. The municipality was governed by a municipal council of directly elected representatives. The mayor was indirectly elected by a vote of the municipal council. The municipality was under the jurisdiction of the Horten District Court and the Agder Court of Appeal.

=== Municipal council ===
The municipal council (Kommunestyre) of Våle Municipality was made up of 25 representatives that were elected to four year terms. The tables below show the historical composition of the council by political party.

Våle kommunestyre 1999–2001
Party name (in Norwegian)	Number of representatives
Labour Party (Arbeiderpartiet)	6
Progress Party (Fremskrittspartiet)	3
Conservative Party (Høyre)	5
Christian Democratic Party (Kristelig Folkeparti)	4
Centre Party (Senterpartiet)	7
Total number of members:	25
Note: On 1 January 2002, Våle Municipality became part of Re Municipality.

Våle kommunestyre 1995–1999
Party name (in Norwegian)	Number of representatives
Labour Party (Arbeiderpartiet)	6
Conservative Party (Høyre)	6
Christian Democratic Party (Kristelig Folkeparti)	4
Centre Party (Senterpartiet)	9
Total number of members:	25

Våle kommunestyre 1991–1995
Party name (in Norwegian)	Number of representatives
Labour Party (Arbeiderpartiet)	6
Conservative Party (Høyre)	7
Christian Democratic Party (Kristelig Folkeparti)	4
Centre Party (Senterpartiet)	8
Total number of members:	25

Våle kommunestyre 1987–1991
Party name (in Norwegian)	Number of representatives
Labour Party (Arbeiderpartiet)	8
Conservative Party (Høyre)	8
Christian Democratic Party (Kristelig Folkeparti)	3
Centre Party (Senterpartiet)	6
Total number of members:	25

Våle kommunestyre 1983–1987
Party name (in Norwegian)	Number of representatives
Labour Party (Arbeiderpartiet)	7
Conservative Party (Høyre)	10
Christian Democratic Party (Kristelig Folkeparti)	2
Centre Party (Senterpartiet)	6
Total number of members:	25

Våle kommunestyre 1979–1983
Party name (in Norwegian)	Number of representatives
Labour Party (Arbeiderpartiet)	7
Conservative Party (Høyre)	9
Christian Democratic Party (Kristelig Folkeparti)	3
Centre Party (Senterpartiet)	6
Total number of members:	25

Våle kommunestyre 1975–1979
Party name (in Norwegian)	Number of representatives
Labour Party (Arbeiderpartiet)	6
Conservative Party (Høyre)	5
Christian Democratic Party (Kristelig Folkeparti)	2
Centre Party (Senterpartiet)	8
Total number of members:	21

Våle kommunestyre 1971–1975
Party name (in Norwegian)	Number of representatives
Labour Party (Arbeiderpartiet)	7
Conservative Party (Høyre)	4
Christian Democratic Party (Kristelig Folkeparti)	1
Centre Party (Senterpartiet)	9
Total number of members:	21

Våle kommunestyre 1967–1971
Party name (in Norwegian)	Number of representatives
Labour Party (Arbeiderpartiet)	7
Conservative Party (Høyre)	5
Christian Democratic Party (Kristelig Folkeparti)	1
Centre Party (Senterpartiet)	8
Total number of members:	21

Våle kommunestyre 1963–1967
Party name (in Norwegian)	Number of representatives
Labour Party (Arbeiderpartiet)	8
Conservative Party (Høyre)	4
Christian Democratic Party (Kristelig Folkeparti)	1
Centre Party (Senterpartiet)	8
Total number of members:	21

Våle herredsstyre 1959–1963
Party name (in Norwegian)	Number of representatives
Labour Party (Arbeiderpartiet)	6
Conservative Party (Høyre)	5
Christian Democratic Party (Kristelig Folkeparti)	1
Centre Party (Senterpartiet)	9
Total number of members:	21

Våle herredsstyre 1955–1959
Party name (in Norwegian)	Number of representatives
Labour Party (Arbeiderpartiet)	7
Conservative Party (Høyre)	4
Christian Democratic Party (Kristelig Folkeparti)	1
Farmers' Party (Bondepartiet)	9
Total number of members:	21

Våle herredsstyre 1951–1955
Party name (in Norwegian)	Number of representatives
Labour Party (Arbeiderpartiet)	10
Conservative Party (Høyre)	8
Farmers' Party (Bondepartiet)	14
Total number of members:	32

Våle herredsstyre 1947–1951
Party name (in Norwegian)	Number of representatives
Labour Party (Arbeiderpartiet)	8
Conservative Party (Høyre)	6
Farmers' Party (Bondepartiet)	16
Joint List(s) of Non-Socialist Parties (Borgerlige Felleslister)	2
Total number of members:	32

Våle herredsstyre 1945–1947
Party name (in Norwegian)	Number of representatives
Labour Party (Arbeiderpartiet)	9
Farmers' Party (Bondepartiet)	15
Joint list of the Liberal Party (Venstre) and the Radical People's Party (Radikale Folkepartiet)	1
List of workers, fishermen, and small farmholders (Arbeidere, fiskere, småbrukere liste)	1
Joint List(s) of Non-Socialist Parties (Borgerlige Felleslister)	6
Total number of members:	32

Våle herredsstyre 1937–1941*
Party name (in Norwegian)	Number of representatives
Labour Party (Arbeiderpartiet)	7
Farmers' Party (Bondepartiet)	13
Liberal Party (Venstre)	2
Joint List(s) of Non-Socialist Parties (Borgerlige Felleslister)	8
Local List(s) (Lokale lister)	2
Total number of members:	32
Note: Due to the German occupation of Norway during World War II, no elections were held for new municipal councils until after the war ended in 1945.

=== Mayors ===
The mayor (Norwegian: ordfører) of Våle Municipality was the political leader of the municipality and the chairperson of the municipal council. The following people have held this position:

- 1838–1839: C.B. Brodahl
- 1839–1843: Simen Elias Crøger
- 1843–1845: C.B. Brodahl
- 1845–1847: Wincent Thurmann
- 1847–1851: C. B. Brodahl
- 1851–1853: Christen Torp
- 1853–1861: Christen Hansen
- 1861–1869: Nicolay Møller
- 1869–1871: Rasmus P. Hals
- 1871–1873: Abraham C. Revetal
- 1873–1875: Ole Bærøe
- 1875–1877: Mathias Hjelmtvedt
- 1877–1879: Ole Bærøe
- 1879–1883: Johan Jørgensen Hundsal (H)
- 1883–1885: Abraham C. Revetal (V)
- 1885–1889: Johan Jørgensen Hundsal (H)
- 1889–1891: Abraham Hillestad (H)
- 1892–1907: Johan Jørgensen Hundsal (H)
- 1908–1925: Hans Kristian Kaldager (H)
- 1926–1928: Jørgen Hundsal (Bp)
- 1929–1931: Hans Kristian Kaldager (H)
- 1932–1937: Jørgen Hundsal (Bp)
- 1938–1940: Ole Martinsen (Bp)
- 1941–1945: Trygve Aanestad (NS)
- 1945–1955: Thorvald Hillestad (Sp)
- 1956–1967: Isak Bjerknes (Sp)
- 1968–1975: Ludvik Bettum (Sp)
- 1976–1982: Odd Jonstang (Sp)
- 1982–1987: Ragnar Gjerpe (H)
- 1988–1991: Thorvald Hillestad (Sp)
- 1992–1995: Marit Haugen (Sp)
- 1996–1999: Kåre Solberg (KrF)
- 1999–2001: Thorvald Hillestad (Sp)

== Notable people ==
- Kåre Holt (1916–1997), an author

== See also ==
- List of former municipalities of Norway
