= Ramnes =

Village in Tønsberg, Norway

- Village
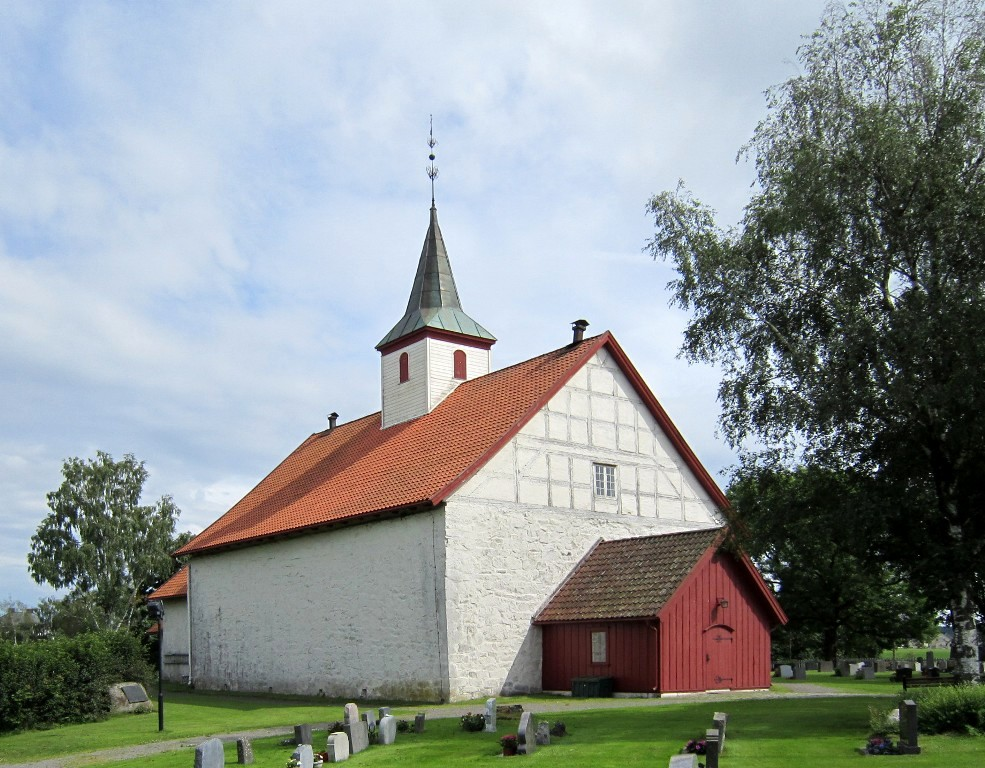
- View of the local Ramnes Church
- Interactive map of Ramnes
- Coordinates: 59.34716°N 10.25208°E
- Country: Norway
- Region: Eastern Norway
- County: Vestfold
- District: Jarlsberg
- Municipality: Tønsberg Municipality
- Elevation: 19 m (62 ft)
- Time zone: UTC+01:00 (CET)
  - Summer (DST): UTC+02:00 (CEST)
- Post Code: 3175 Ramnes

Ramnes is a village in Tønsberg Municipality in Vestfold county, Norway. The village is located about 12 kilometres (7.5 mi) to the northwest of the city of Tønsberg, about 3.5 kilometres (2.2 mi) to the northwest of the village of Linnestad, about 2.5 kilometres (1.6 mi) to the southwest of the villages of Bergsåsen/Revetal, and about 7.5 kilometres (4.7 mi) to the south of the village of Fon.

== History ==
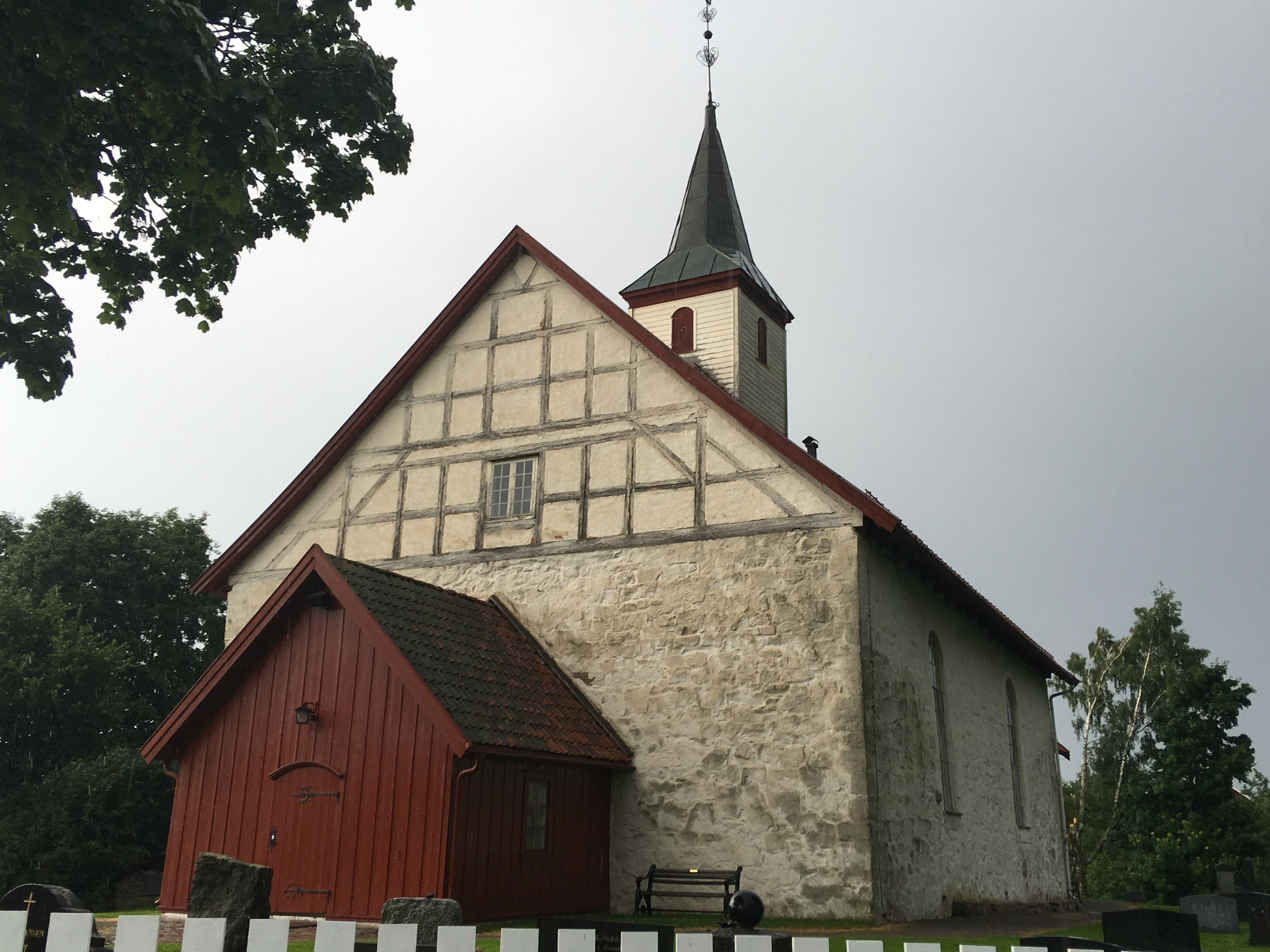
Ramnes Church

Historically, Ramnes was the administrative centre of the old Ramnes Municipality which existed from 1838 until 2002 when Ramnes Municipality and Våle Municipality were merged to form Re Municipality.

=== Name ===
The municipality (originally the parish) is named after the old Ramnes farm (Old Norse: Rafnnes) since the first Ramnes Church was built there. The first element is hrafn which means "raven". The last element is nes which means "headland", which is likely referring to the area between two rivers.

=== Ramnes Church ===
Ramnes Church (Norwegian: Ramnes kirke) is a medieval-era stone church that is located in the village. It is part of the Nord-Jarlsberg prosti. The stone-and-brick church was built in 1150. The baptismal font dates from the 1100s. The towers are from the early 1600s. The altarpiece and pulpit are from the second half of the 1600s. It is a long church with about 250 seats.
