= Gretteåsen =

Village in Tønsberg, Norway

- Village
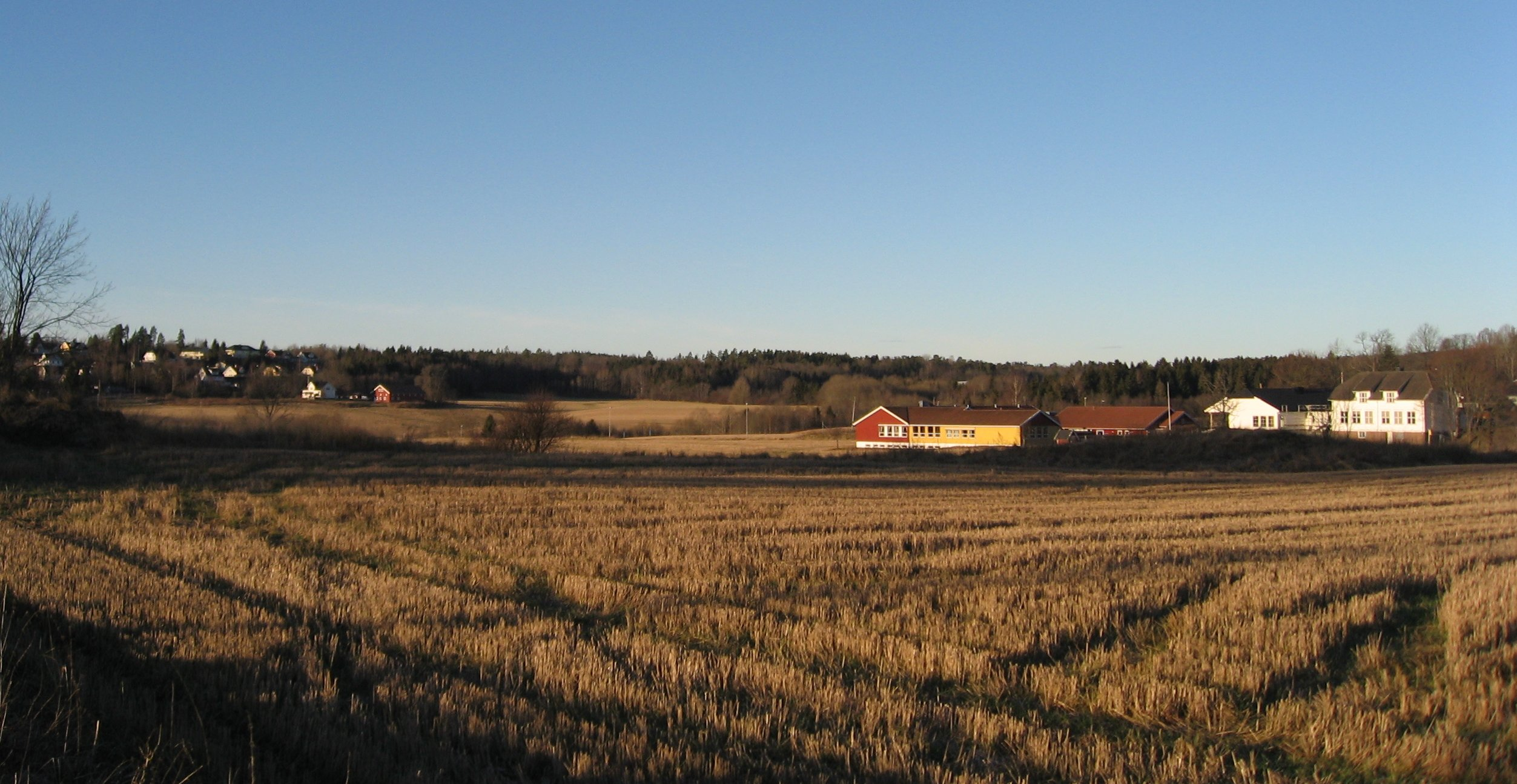
- View of the farmland just outside Gretteåsen
- Interactive map of Gretteåsen
- Coordinates: 59.37127°N 10.35085°E
- Country: Norway
- Region: Eastern Norway
- County: Vestfold
- Municipality: Tønsberg Municipality

Area
  - Total: 0.1 km^{2} (0.039 sq mi)
- Elevation: 79 m (259 ft)

Population (2026)
  - Total: 246
  - Density: 2,460/km^{2} (6,400/sq mi)
- Time zone: UTC+01:00 (CET)
  - Summer (DST): UTC+02:00 (CEST)
- Post Code: 3176 Undrumsdal

Gretteåsen is a village in Tønsberg Municipality in Vestfold county, Norway. The village is located about 12 kilometres (7.5 mi) north of the city of Tønsberg, about 7 kilometres (4.3 mi) west of the city of Horten, and about 5 kilometres (3.1 mi) east of the village of Revetal. The European route E18 highway and the Undrumsdal Church are both located about 1 kilometre (0.62 mi) east of the village.

The 0.1-square-kilometre (25-acre) village has a population (2026) of 246 and a population density of 2,460 inhabitants per square kilometre (6,400/sq mi).
