= Eva Lian =

Norwegian politician (born 1956)

Eva Lian (born 5 September 1956 in Hof, Vestfold) is a Norwegian politician for the Centre Party.

She was elected to the Norwegian Parliament from Vestfold in 1993, but was not re-elected in 1997.

Lian served as mayor of Ramnes Municipality from 1987 to 1993.
