= Torstein Håland =

Norwegian politician (1925–2004)

Torstein Håland (29 May 1925 – 23 November 2004) was a Norwegian politician for the Centre Party.

He served as a deputy representative to the Parliament of Norway from Vestfold during the term 1973–1977. He was the third candidate on the Liberal/Centre ballot behind Aslaug Fadum and Eystein Bærug. He was also mayor of Ramnes Municipality.
