= Linnestad =

Village in Tønsberg, Norway

- Village
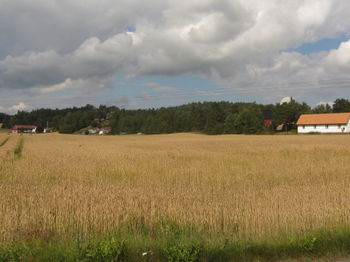
- View of the village
- Interactive map of Linnestad
- Coordinates: 59.34225°N 10.30609°E
- Country: Norway
- Region: Eastern Norway
- County: Vestfold
- Municipality: Tønsberg Municipality

Area
  - Total: 0.42 km^{2} (0.16 sq mi)
- Elevation: 20 m (66 ft)

Population (2026)
  - Total: 328
  - Density: 781/km^{2} (2,020/sq mi)
- Time zone: UTC+01:00 (CET)
  - Summer (DST): UTC+02:00 (CEST)
- Post Code: 3175 Ramnes

Linnestad is a village in Tønsberg Municipality in Vestfold county, Norway. It is located about 10 kilometres (6.2 mi) to the northwest of the city of Tønsberg, about 3 kilometres (1.9 mi) to the southeast of the village of Ramnes, and about 5 kilometres (3.1 mi) to the southeast of Revetal.

The 0.42-square-kilometre (100-acre) village has a population of 328 (2026) and a population density of 781 inhabitants per square kilometre (2,020/sq mi).
