= Carbuncle (heraldry) =

Heraldic symbol

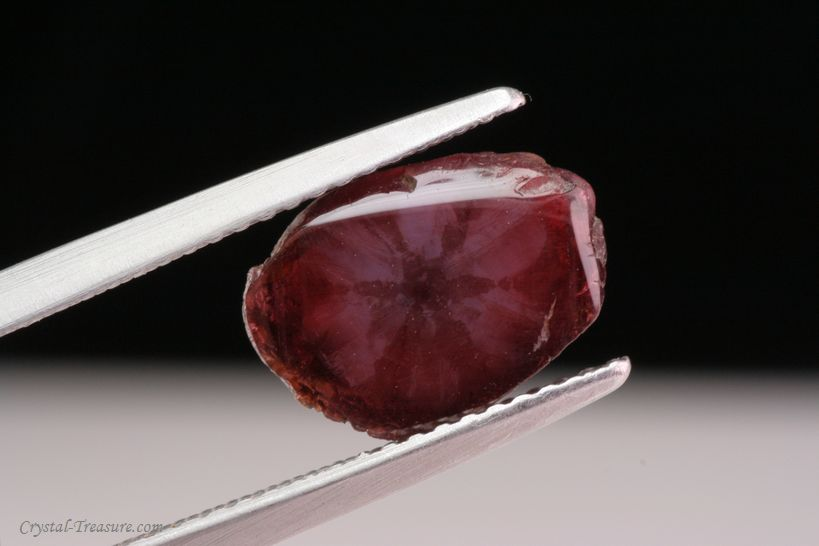
A carbuncle gemstone with 'rays' radiating from centre.

A carbuncle or escarbuncle is a heraldic charge consisting of eight radiating rods or spokes, four of which make a common cross and the other four a saltire. The ends typically terminate in a fleur-de-lis or some other decorative form. Frequently the centrepoint is adorned with a jewel; the name may therefore be a reference to a carbuncle gemstone though in heraldry the jewel need not be red.

It has its origins in the iron bands and bosses historically used to strengthen shields. The name may therefore be derived from the Old French boucle, meaning a shield boss.

== Gallery ==
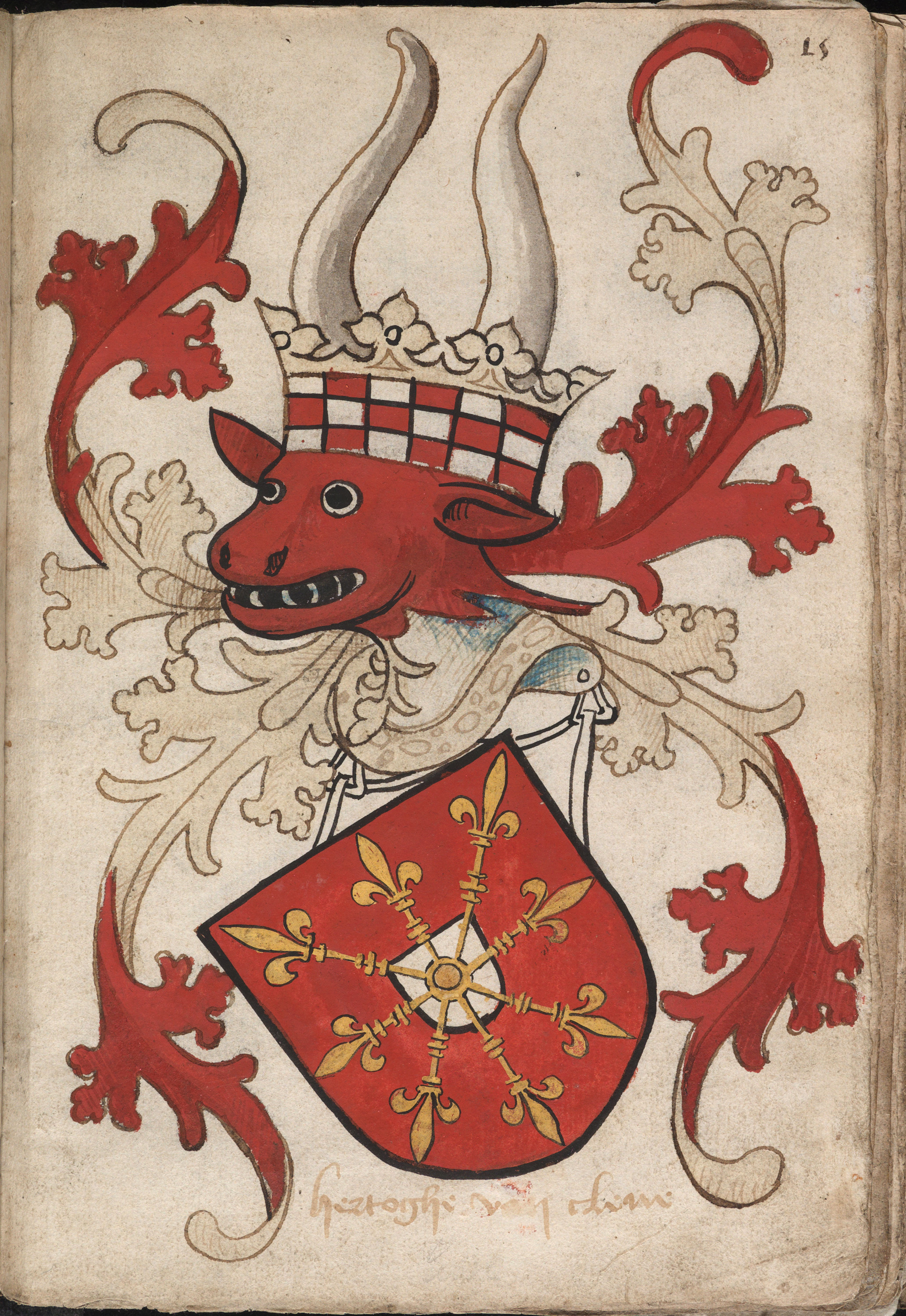
Arms of the Duke of Cleves

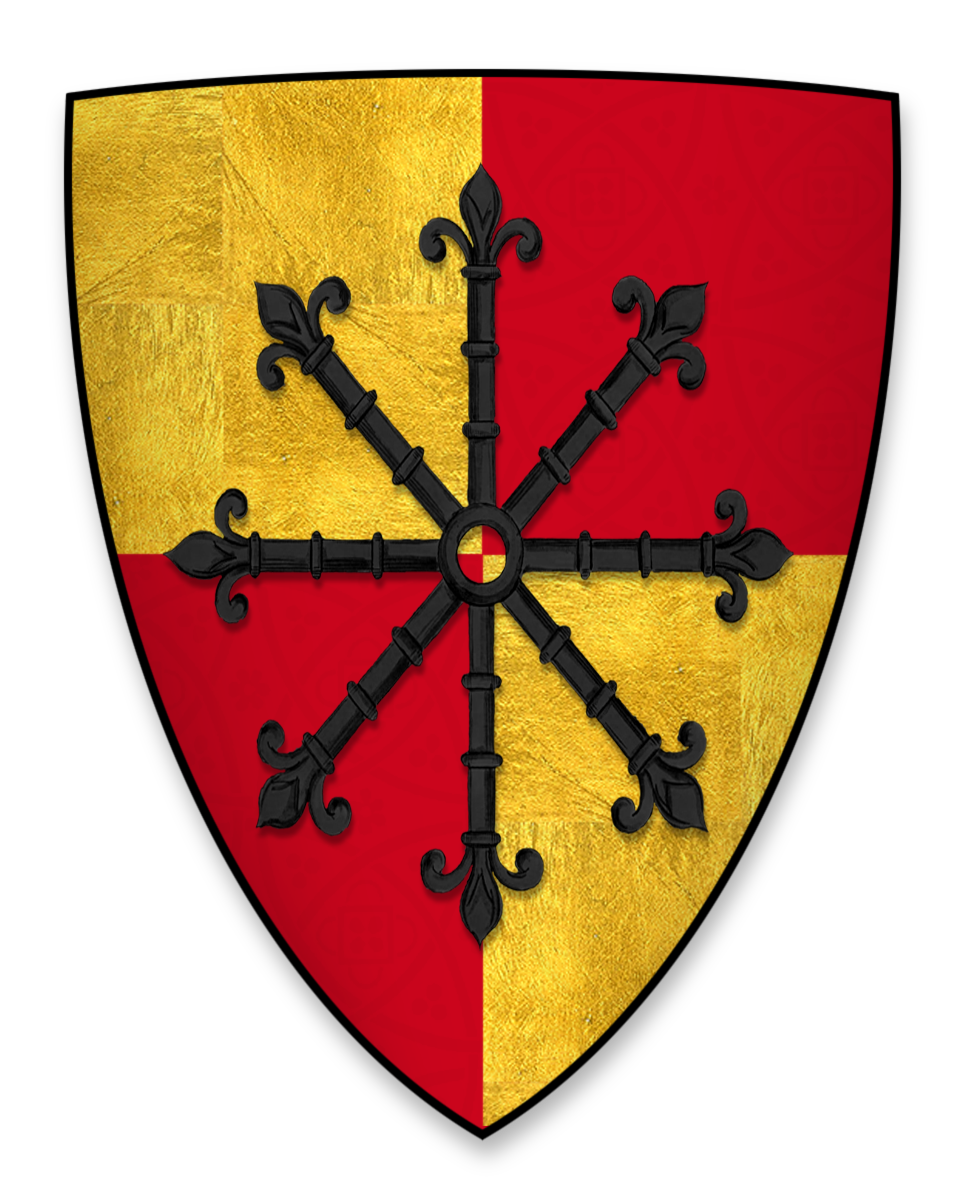
Arms of Geoffrey de Mandeville, Earl of Essex and Gloucester: Quarterly Or and gules, an escarbuncle sable.

Arms of the town of Louvil in France: Gules, an escarbuncle Or pierced vert.

Arms of the Duke of Cleves in Germany: Gules, an escutcheon argent surmounted by an escarbuncle Or.

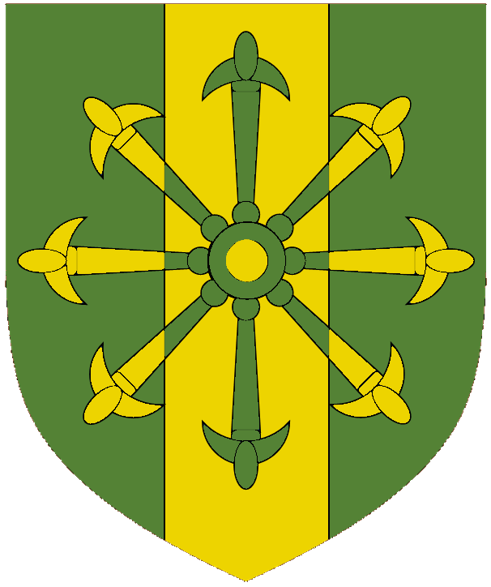
Canting arms of Lord Palumbo: Vert a Pale Or over all an Escarbuncle [also called umbo] counterchanged.
