= Revetal =

Village in Tønsberg, Norway

- Village
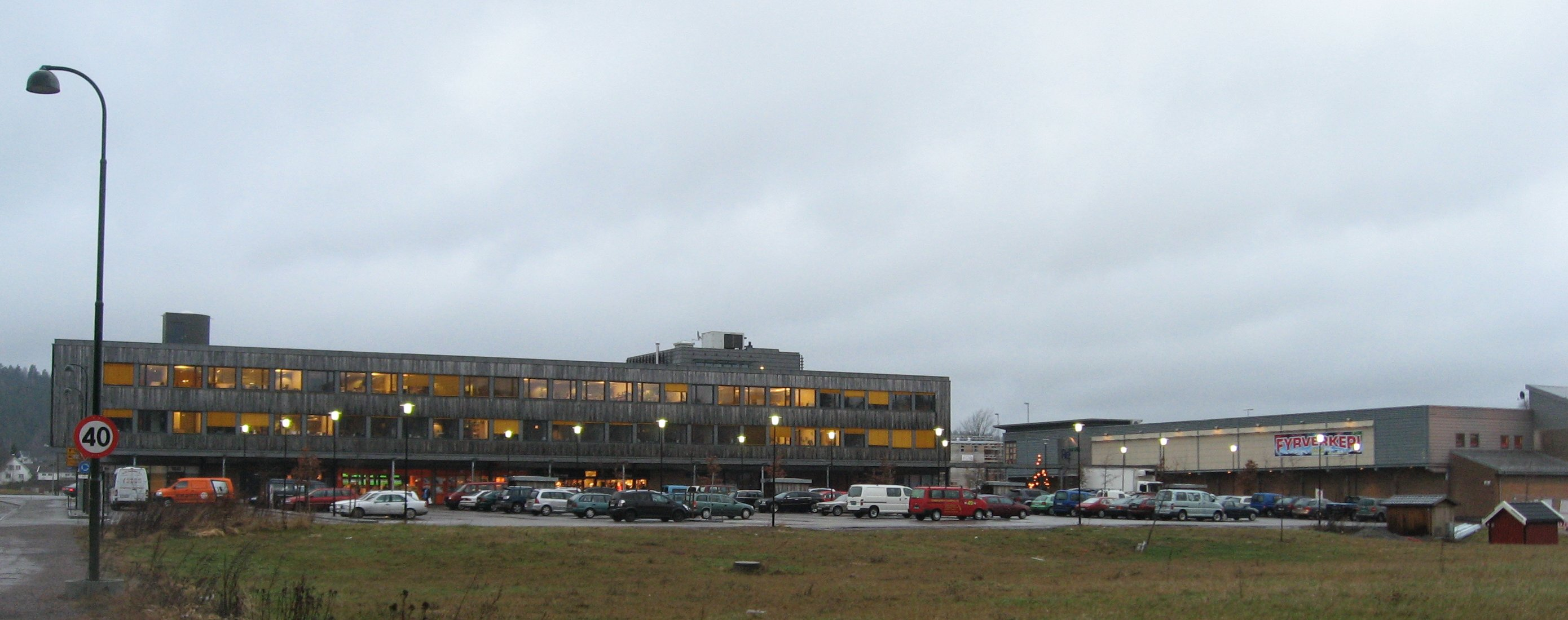
- View of the village
- Interactive map of Revetal
- Coordinates: 59.37239°N 10.26308°E
- Country: Norway
- Region: Eastern Norway
- County: Vestfold
- Municipality: Tønsberg Municipality

Area
  - Total: 1.63 km^{2} (0.63 sq mi)
- Elevation: 25 m (82 ft)

Population (2026)
  - Total: 2,521
  - Density: 1,547/km^{2} (4,010/sq mi)
- Time zone: UTC+01:00 (CET)
  - Summer (DST): UTC+02:00 (CEST)
- Post Code: 3174 Revetal

Revetal is a village in Tønsberg Municipality in Vestfold county, Norway. It is located about 15 kilometres (9.3 mi) to the northwest of the city of Tønsberg, about 5 kilometres (3.1 mi) to the northwest of the village of Linnestad, about 5 kilometres (3.1 mi) to the south of the village of Brekkeåsen, and about 1 kilometre (0.62 mi) east of the village of Bergsåsen. Revetal is a regional centre of trade and service, as well as some industry.

Over the years, the villages of Revetal and Bergsåsen have grown together due to conurbation. Statistics Norway considers them to be one urban area. The 1.63-square-kilometre (400-acre) village area has a population of 2,521 (2026) and a population density of 1,547 inhabitants per square kilometre (4,010/sq mi).

== History ==
The village was the administrative centre of the old Re Municipality which existed from 2002 until 2020 when it became part of Tønsberg Municipality.
