= Bergsåsen =

Village in Tønsberg Municipality, Norway

Bergåsen
- Village
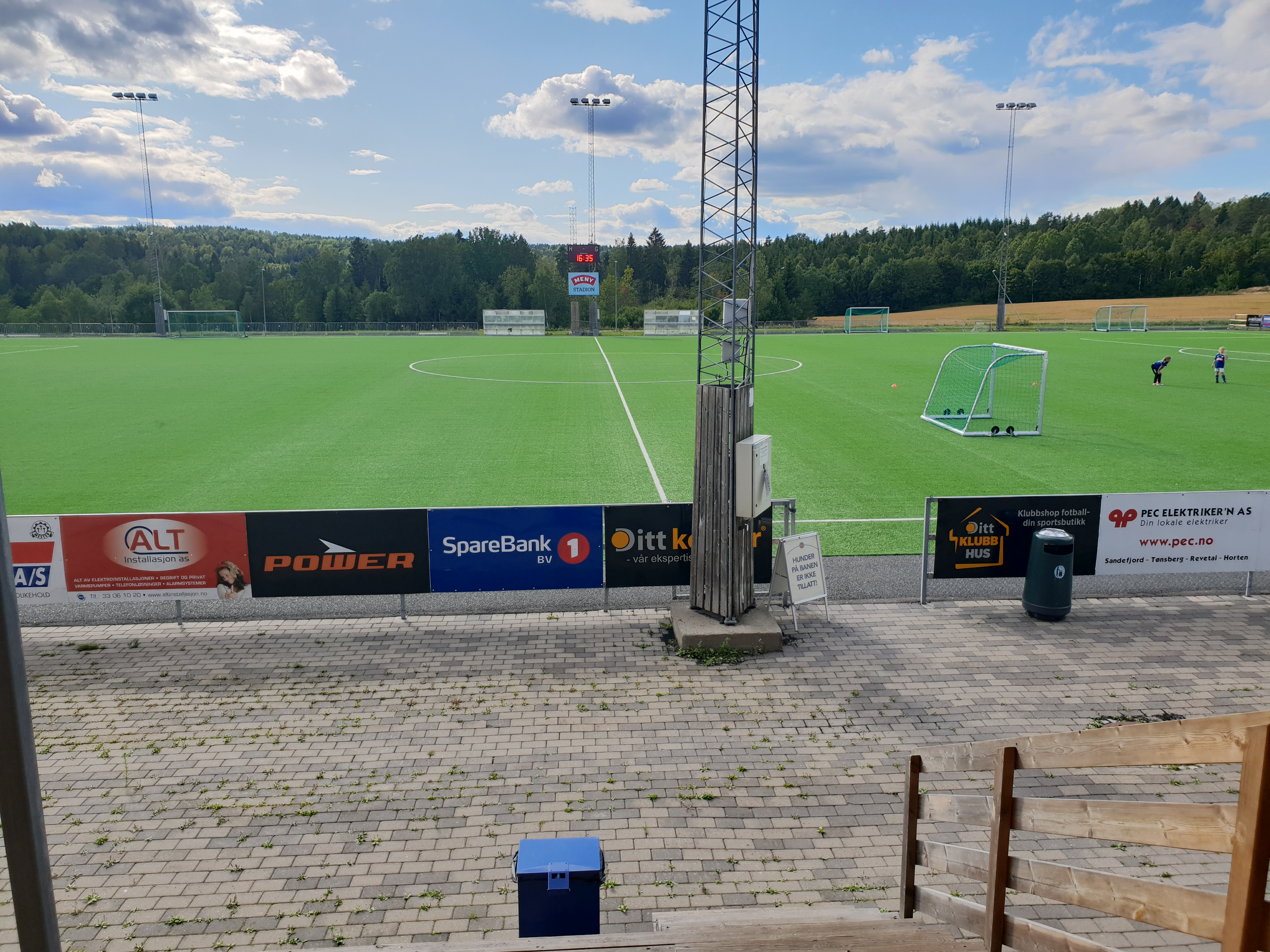
- View of a local park
- Interactive map of Bergåsen
- Coordinates: 59.36375°N 10.2475°E
- Country: Norway
- Region: Eastern Norway
- County: Vestfold
- Municipality: Tønsberg Municipality
- Elevation: 93 m (305 ft)
- Time zone: UTC+01:00 (CET)
  - Summer (DST): UTC+02:00 (CEST)
- Post Code: 3175 Ramnes

Bergåsen is a village in Tønsberg Municipality in Vestfold county, Norway. The village is located about 1 kilometre (0.62 mi) to the southwest of the village of Revetal. The village of Ramnes, where the medieval Ramnes Church is located, lies about 1.5 kilometres (0.93 mi) to the south of Bergåsen.

Over the years, Bergåsen and Revetal have grown together due to conurbation. Statistics Norway considers them to be one urban area. The 1.63-square-kilometre (400-acre) combined village area has a population (2026) of 2,521 and a population density of 1,547 inhabitants per square kilometre (4,010/sq mi).
