= Undrumsdal Church =

Church in Vestfold, Norway

- Undrumsdal kirke
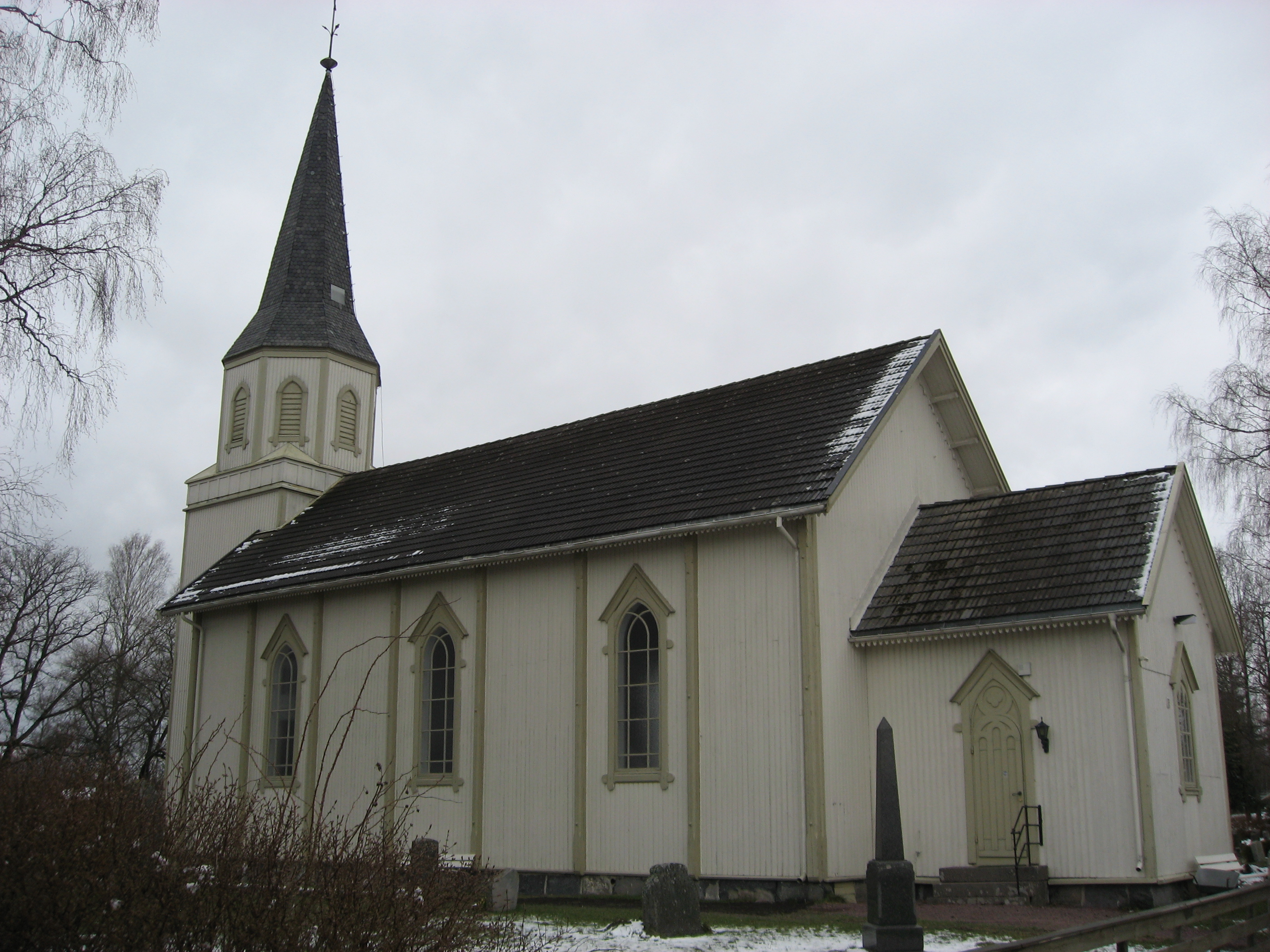
- View of the church
- Undrumsdal Church
- 59°22′19″N 10°22′07″E
- Location: Tønsberg Municipality, Vestfold
- Country: Norway
- Denomination: Church of Norway
- Previous denomination: Catholic Church
- Churchmanship: Evangelical Lutheran

History
- Status: Parish church
- Founded: 12th century
- Consecrated: 1882

Architecture
- Functional status: Active
- Architect: F. Rasmussen
- Architectural type: Long church
- Completed: 1882 (144 years ago)

Specifications
- Capacity: 162
- Materials: Wood

Administration
- Diocese: Tunsberg
- Deanery: Tønsberg domprosti
- Parish: Undrumsdal
- Norwegian Cultural Heritage Site
- Type: Church
- Status: Not protected
- ID: 85726

Undrumsdal Church (Norwegian: Undrumsdal kirke) is a parish church of the Church of Norway in Tønsberg Municipality in Vestfold county, Norway. It is located in the village of Undrumsdal. It is the church for the Undrumsdal parish which is part of the Tønsberg domprosti (deanery) in the Diocese of Tunsberg. The white, wooden church was built in a long church design in 1882 using plans drawn up by the architect F. Rasmussen. The church seats about 162 people.

== History ==
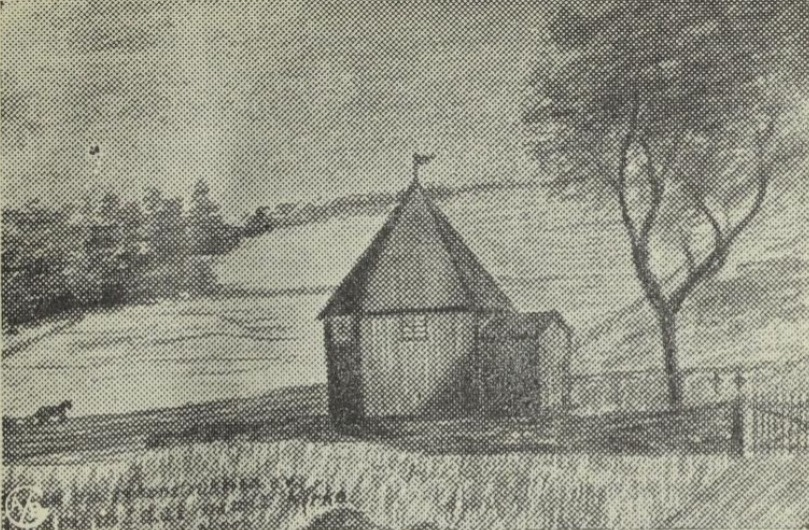
View of the old church (1730-1882)

The earliest existing historical records of the church date back to the year 1315, but the church was not built that year. The first church in Undrumsdal was likely a wooden stave church that was built in the early 12th century (before the 1120s) at Rød, a site about 400 metres (1,300 ft) to the south-southwest of the present church site.

In 1730, the old church was torn down and a new church was built on the same site. The new church was owned by the Count of Jarlsberg, but half the cost of the church was paid for by the congregation. The new church had a octagonal floor plan and a pulpit altar and seats for about 100 people. The church was constructed during the summer of 1730 and it was consecrated by Bishop Bartholomæus Deichman on 22 September 1730. The Count sold the church in 1775, and it went through several other owners before 1876 when it became owned by the congregation. By then, the building was in poor condition. It was then decided to build a new church on a site approximately 400 metres (1,300 ft) to the north. The new site was chosen because the old site had a lot of rocky ground which was problematic as a burial ground. The new site had much better ground for the cemetery.

In 1882, the new church was constructed on the new site and the old church was torn down. The church was consecrated the same year. The new church was a wooden long church that was designed and built by F. Rasmussen from Horten. It was designed with a rectangular nave with a chancel that was the same width as the nave. The choir floor is a small step higher than the floor of the nave, and the church has a chancel partition in the form of a kind of screen wall with openings. There is a sacristy that extends off of the chancel to the east. On the west end of the nave, there was a church porch with a large tower above it. The building was renovated in 1981 and again in 1998.

== Media gallery ==
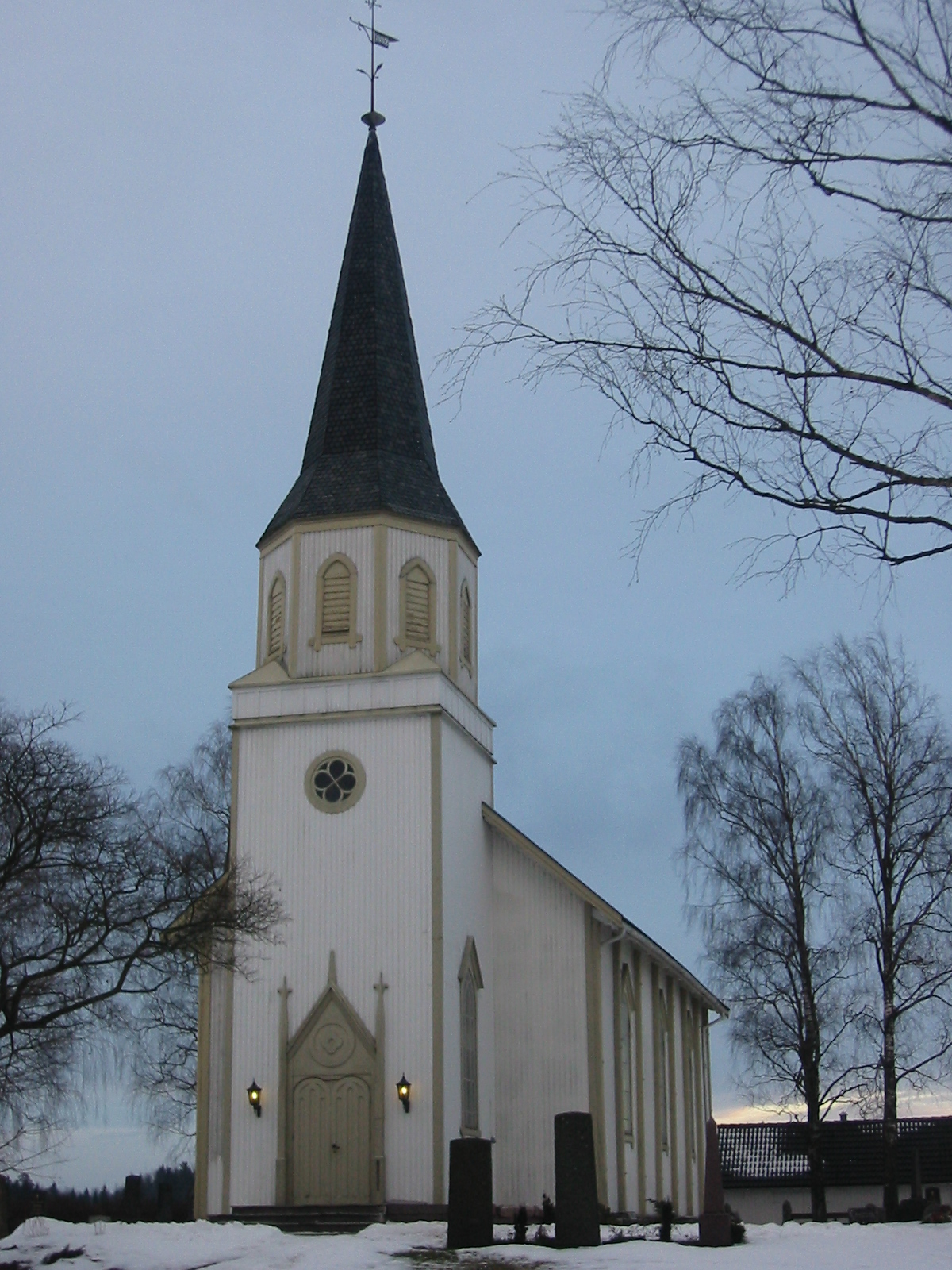

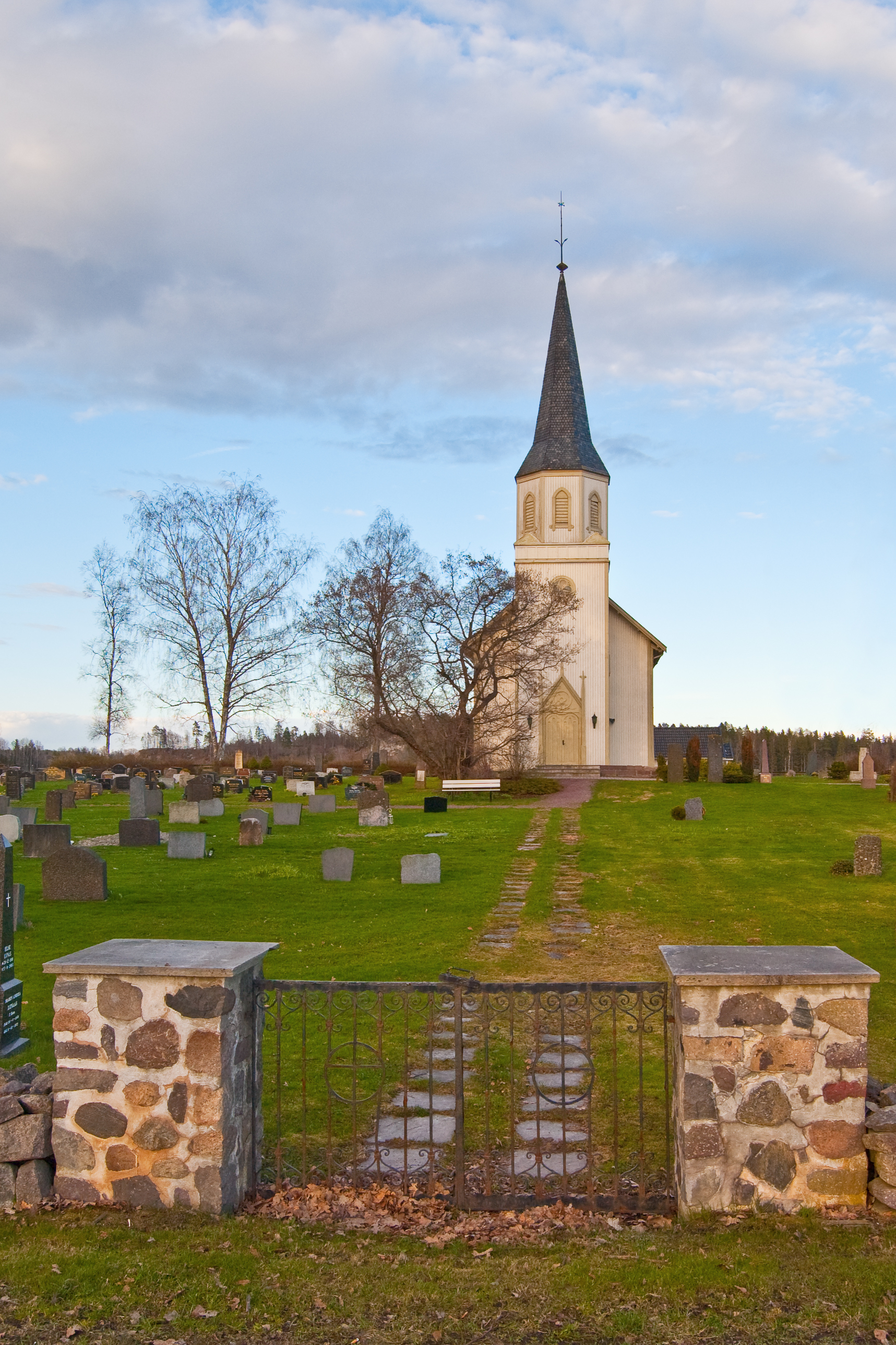

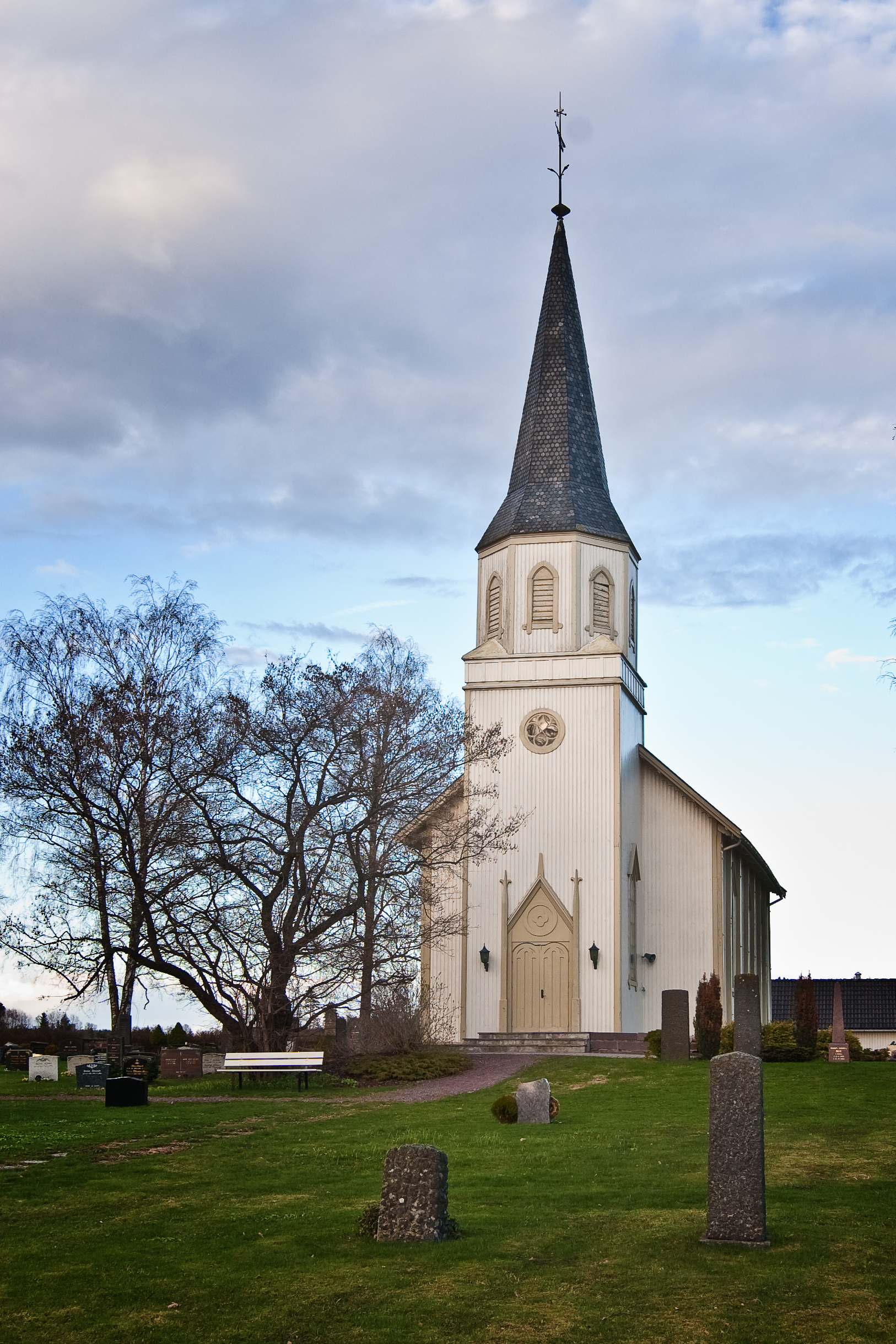

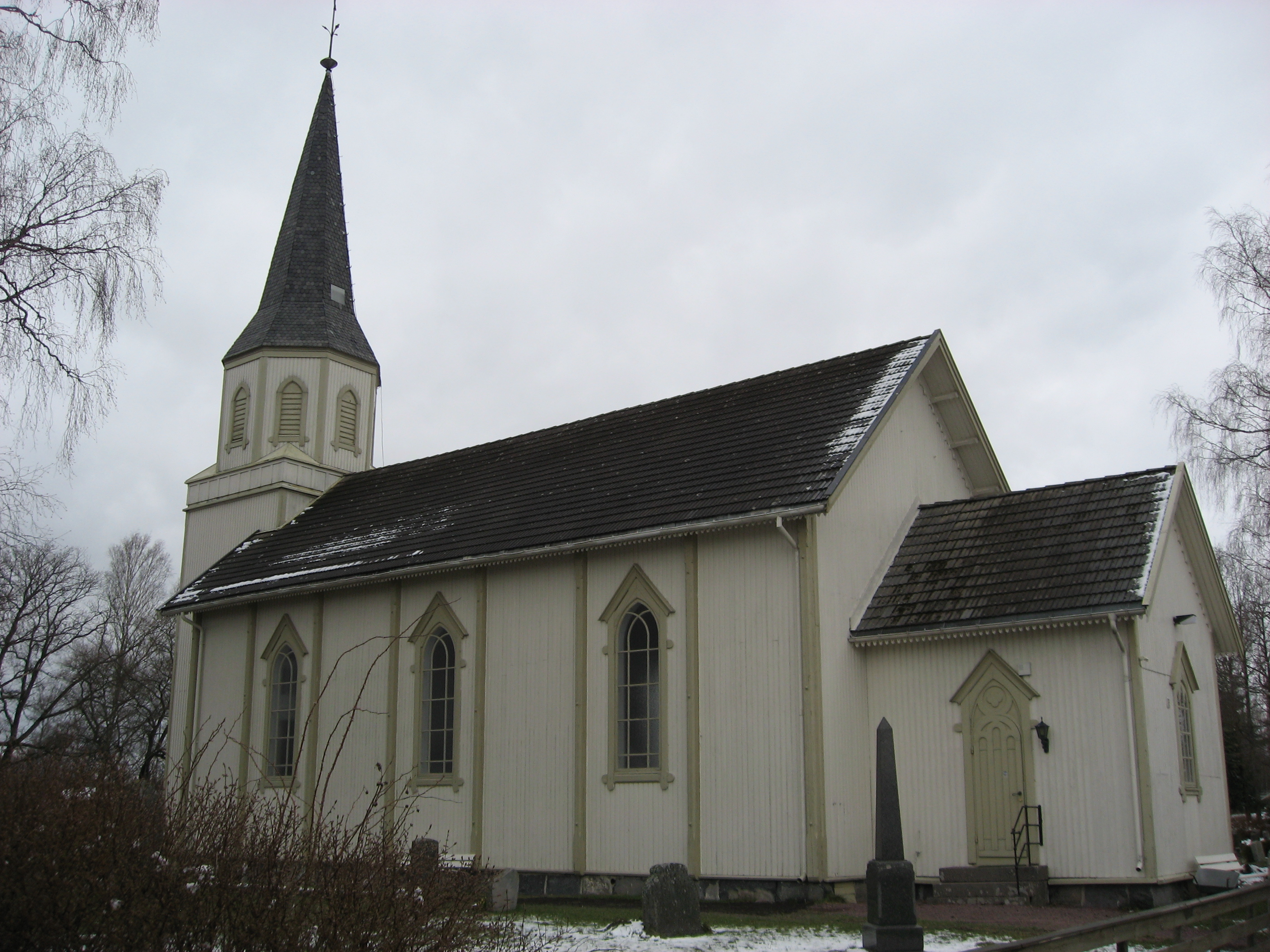

== See also ==
- List of churches in Tunsberg
