= Ramnes Church =

Church in Vestfold, Norway

- Ramnes kirke
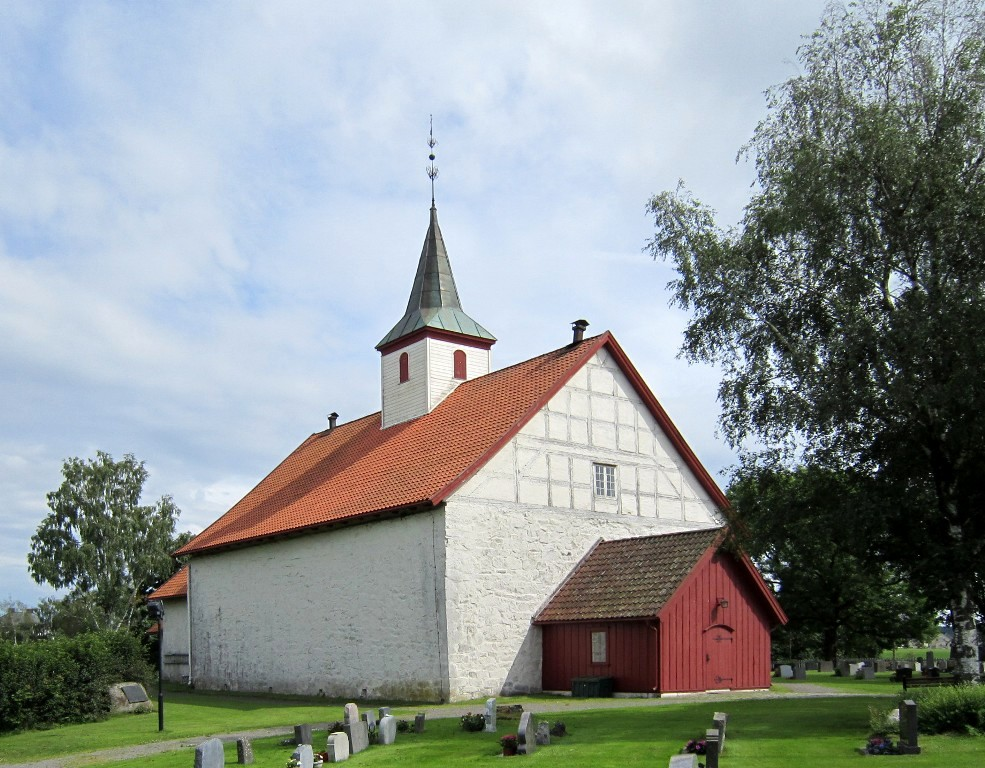
- View of the church
- Ramnes Church
- 59°20′47″N 10°15′17″E
- Location: Tønsberg Municipality, Vestfold
- Country: Norway
- Denomination: Church of Norway
- Previous denomination: Catholic Church
- Churchmanship: Evangelical Lutheran

History
- Status: Parish church
- Founded: 11th century
- Consecrated: 7 March (c. 1150)

Architecture
- Functional status: Active
- Architectural type: Long church
- Completed: c. 1150 (876 years ago)

Specifications
- Capacity: 234
- Materials: Stone

Administration
- Diocese: Tunsberg
- Deanery: Tønsberg domprosti
- Parish: Ramnes
- Norwegian Cultural Heritage Site
- Type: Church
- Status: Automatically protected
- ID: 85265

Ramnes Church (Norwegian: Ramnes kirke) is a parish church of the Church of Norway in Tønsberg Municipality in Vestfold county, Norway. It is located in the village of Ramnes. It is the church for the Ramnes parish which is part of the Tønsberg domprosti (deanery) in the Diocese of Tunsberg. The white, stone church was built in a long church design around the year 1150, using plans drawn up by an unknown architect. The church seats about 234 people.

== History ==
The earliest existing historical records of the church date back to the year 1363, but the church was not built that year. The first church in Ramnes was likely a wooden post church that was built during the 11th century. Around the year 1150, the wooden church was torn down and a new stone church were built on the site. The stone church initially consisted of a nave and chancel. The main entrance (portal) was on the south wall of the nave and a secondary entrance was on the south wall of the chancel. The walls of the church were made of stone but the gables were timber-framed. Like most medieval stone churches, there were no windows on the north wall. The church was originally dedicated to the Saints Peter and Paul and the building was consecrated on 7 March (year uncertain).

During the early 17th century, the church roof was rebuilt and larger windows were installed. Also during this renovation, the south portal in the nave and the chancel were bricked up and a new entrance to the church on the west end of the nave was constructed. In 1653, another renovation took place. A new church porch and a new sacristy was built. Inside the church, a new flat ceiling and second-floor seating galleries were installed along the west and north walls. A new altarpiece and pulpit were installed too. In 1673, the Count of Jarlsberg took over ownership of the church.

In 1814, this church served as an election church (Norwegian: valgkirke). Together with more than 300 other parish churches across Norway, it was a polling station for elections to the 1814 Norwegian Constituent Assembly which wrote the Constitution of Norway. This was Norway's first national election. Each church parish was a constituency that elected people called "electors" who later met together in each county to elect the representatives for the assembly that was to meet at Eidsvoll Manor later that year.

In 1895, the church was sold to the congregation and was no longer in private ownership. In the early 20th century, it was obvious that major repairs were necessary. The architect Carl Berner was hired to plan a renovation in 1914. It was not until around 1930, however, that the major restoration was carried out. The artist Domenico Erdmann planned the interior designs for this renovation.

== Media gallery ==
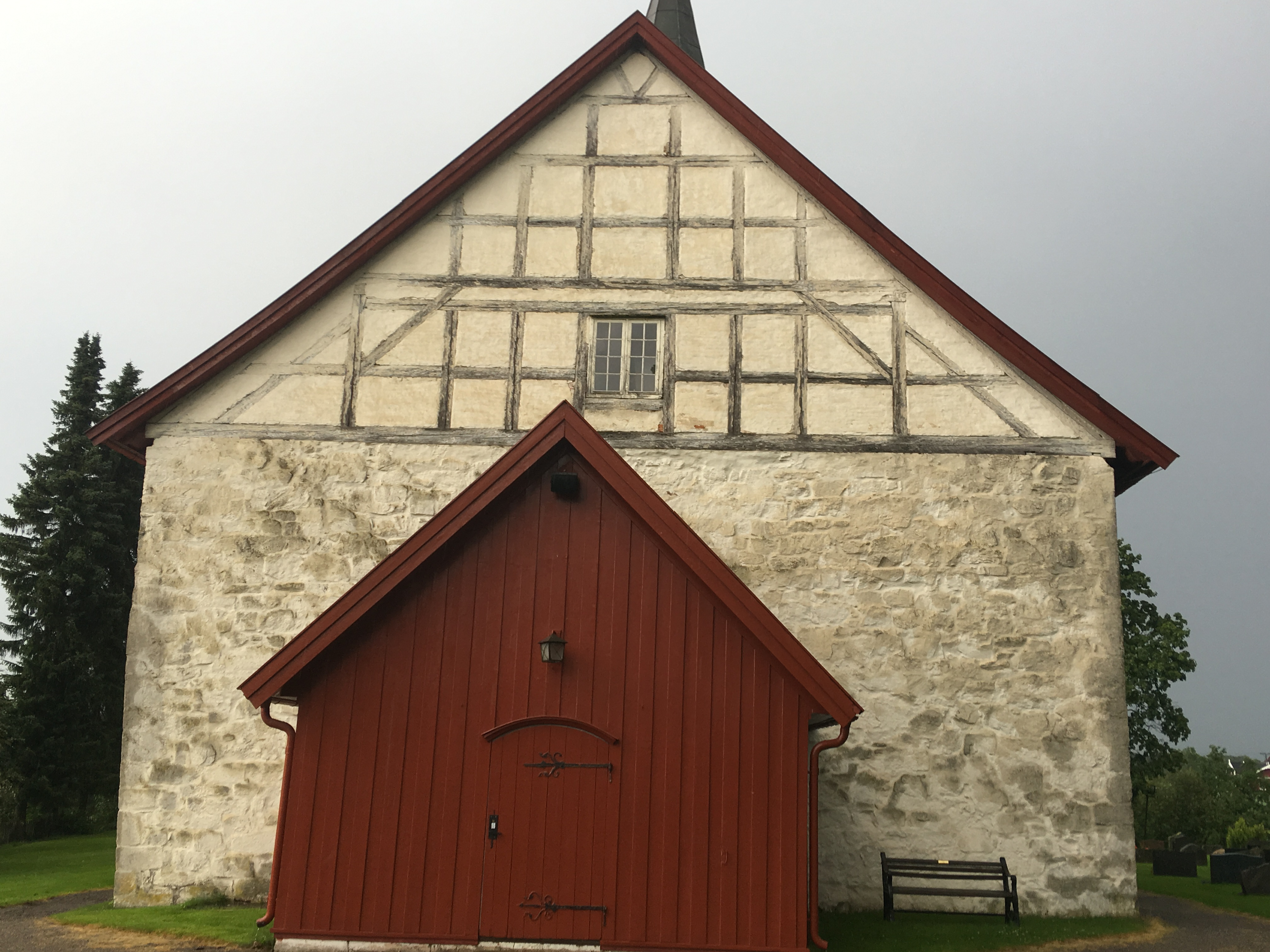

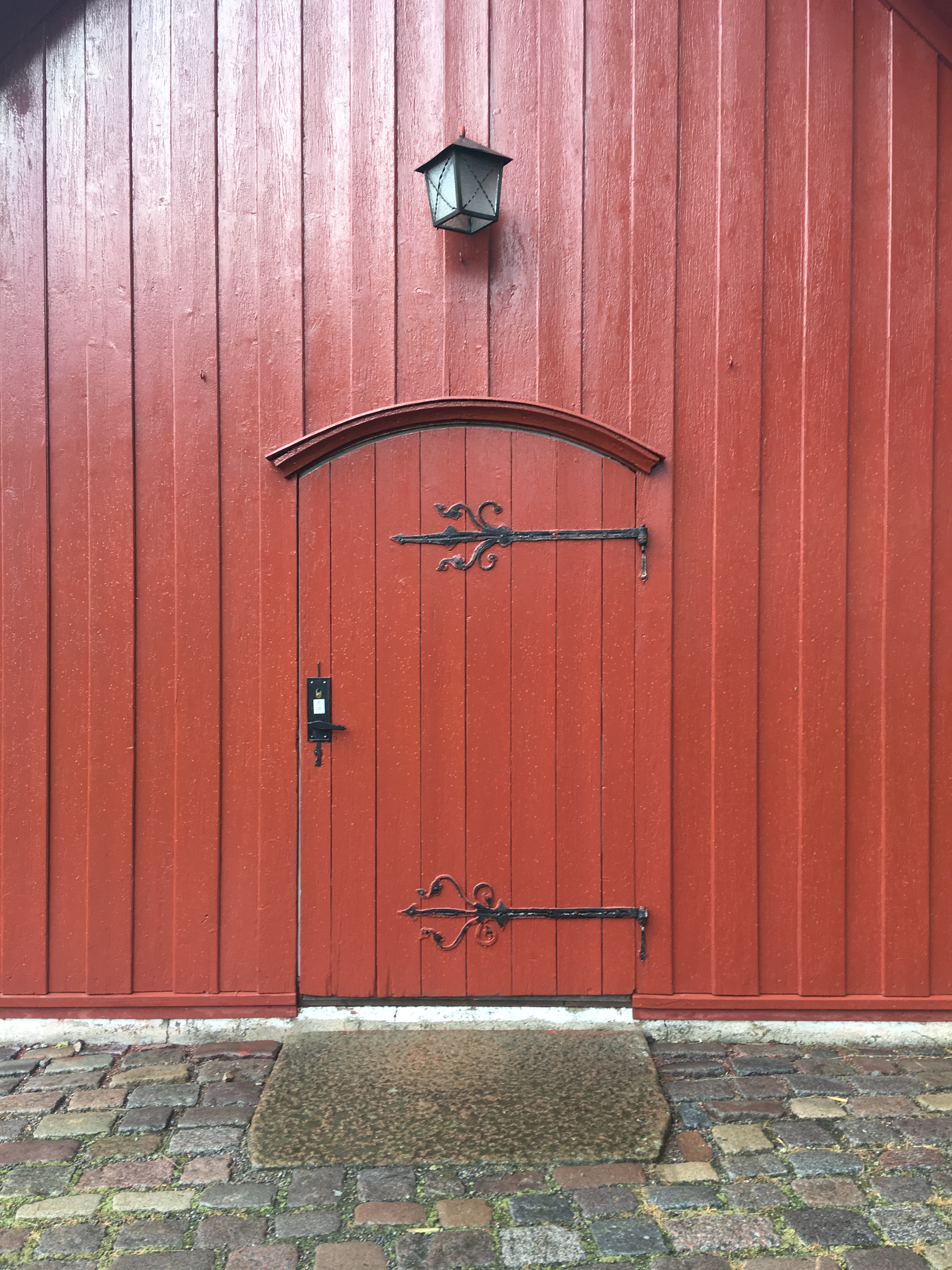

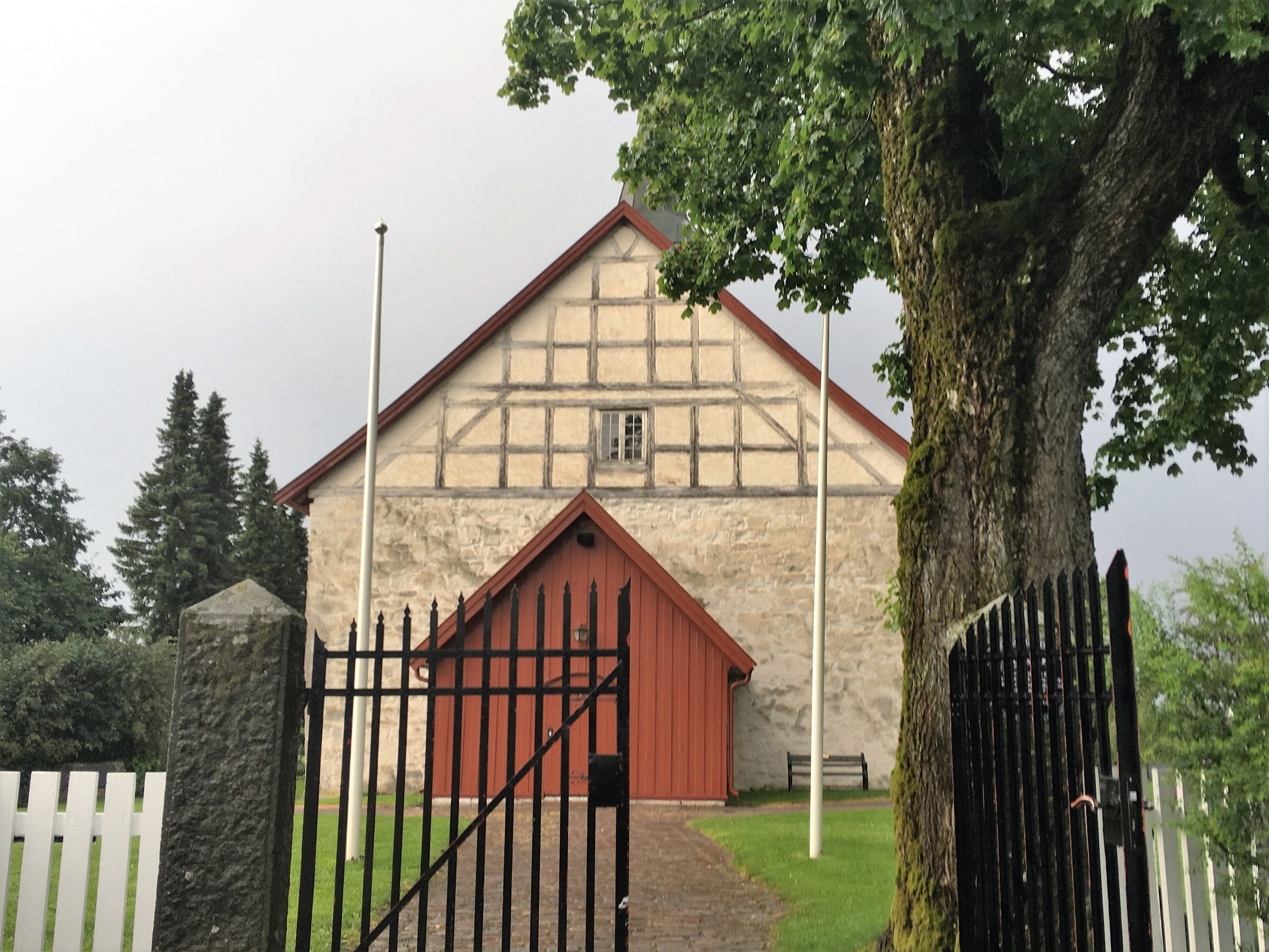

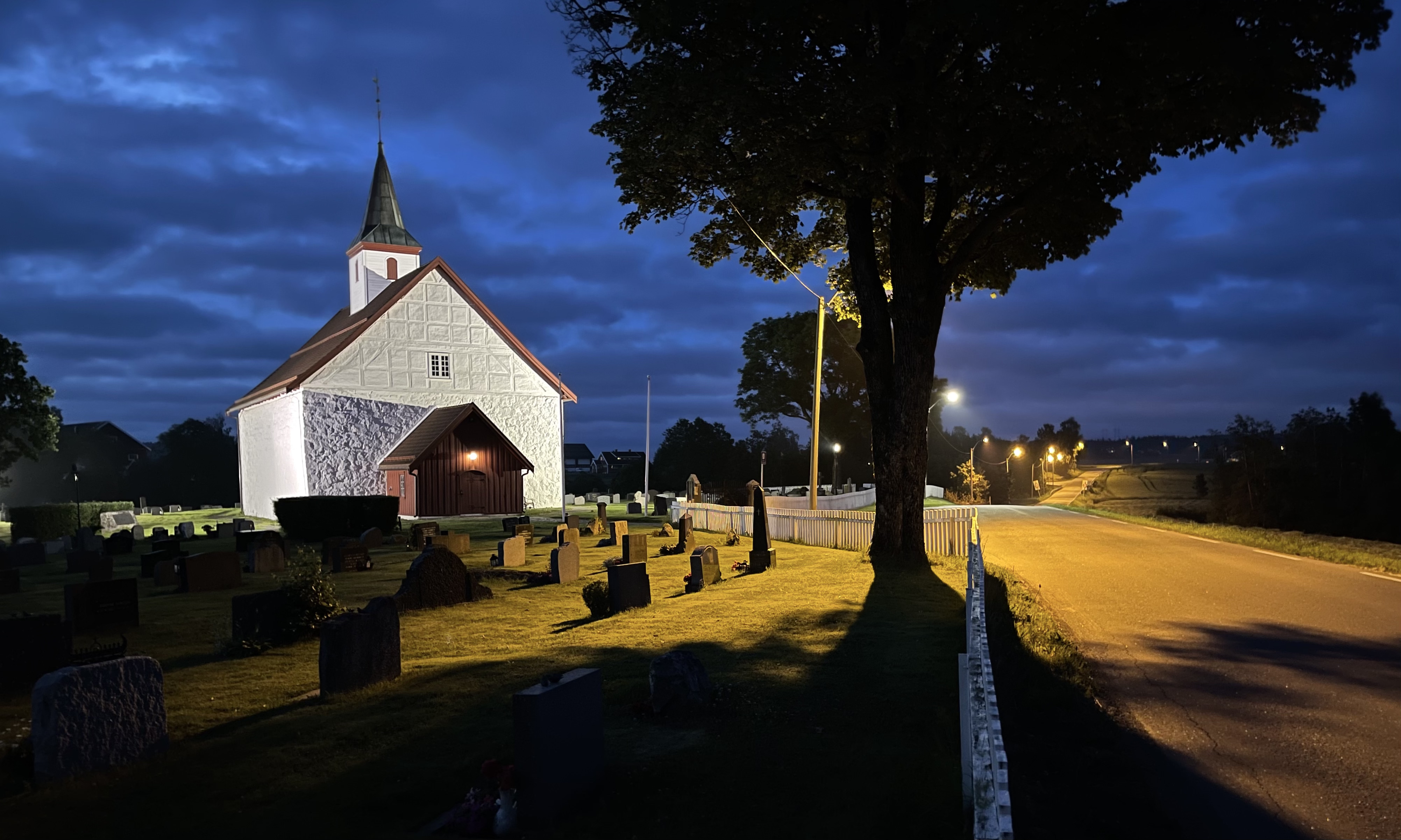

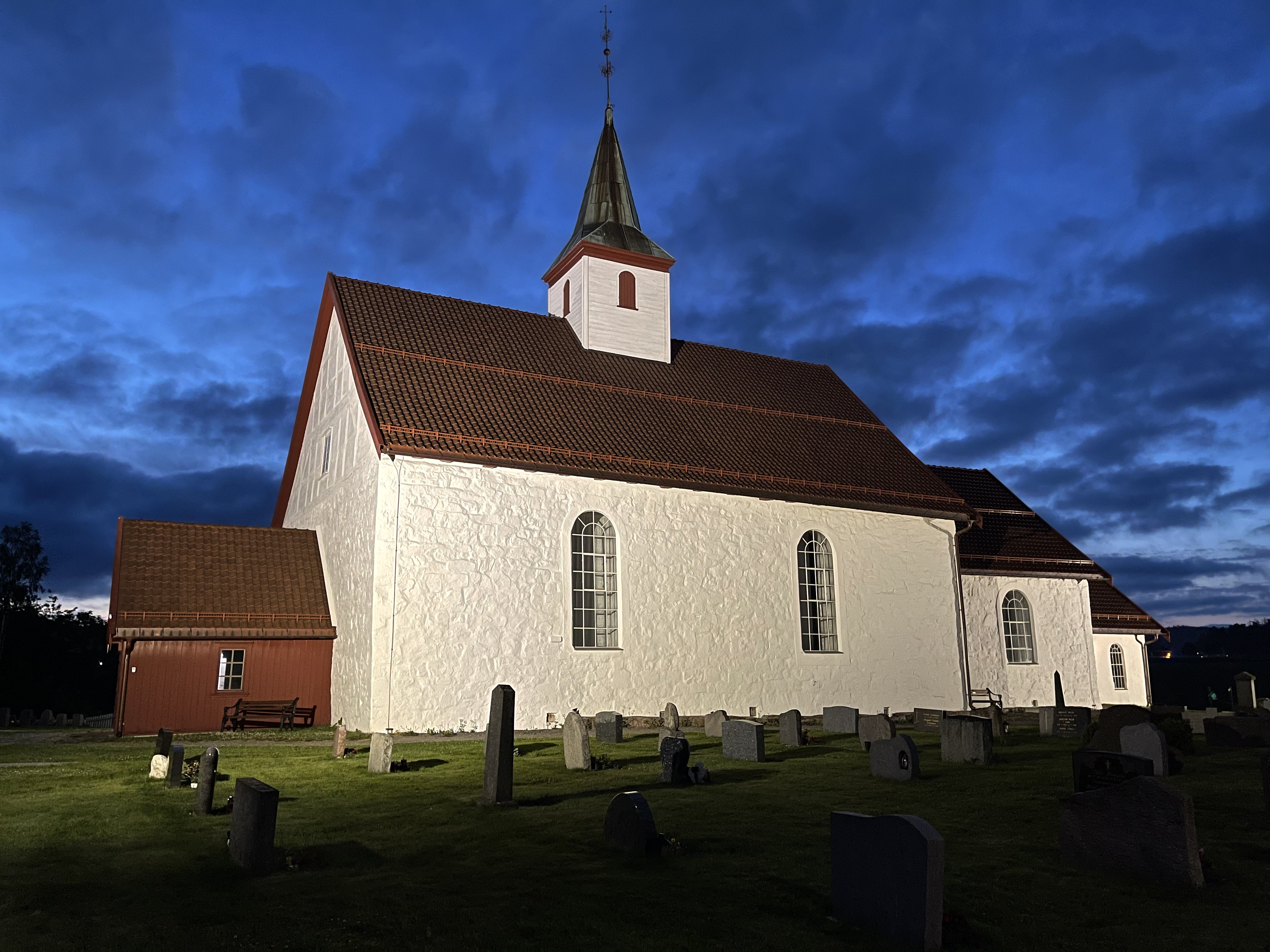

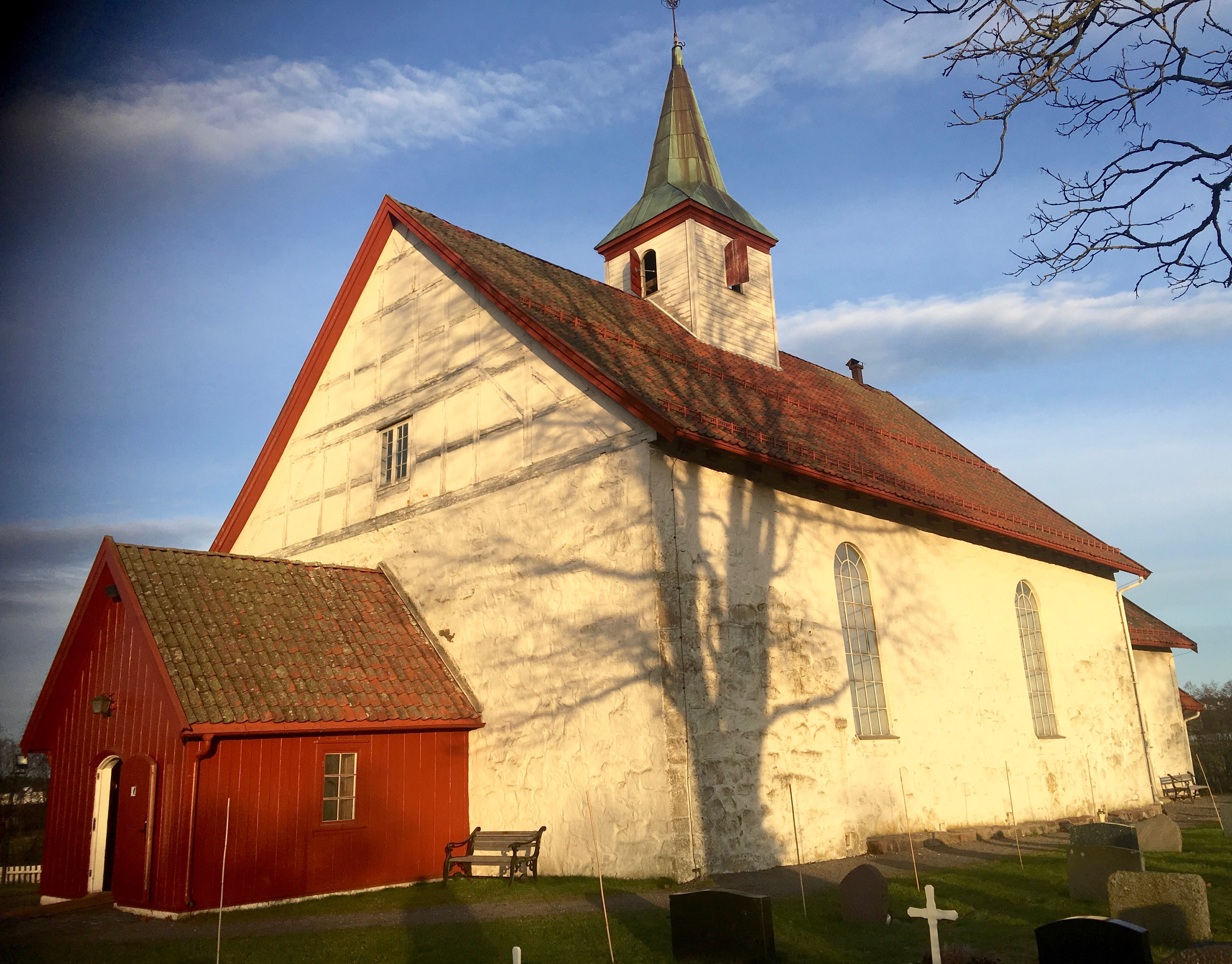

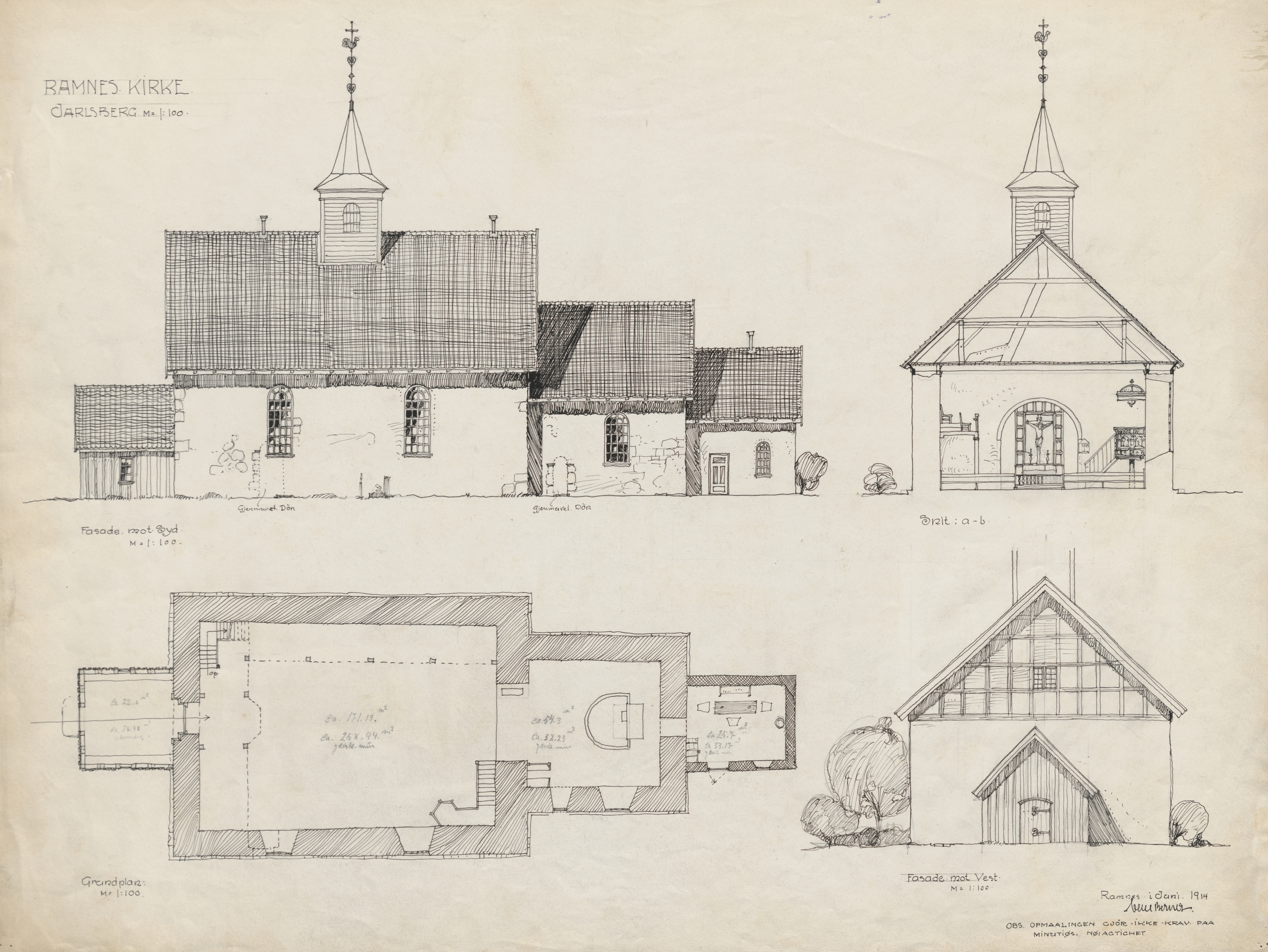

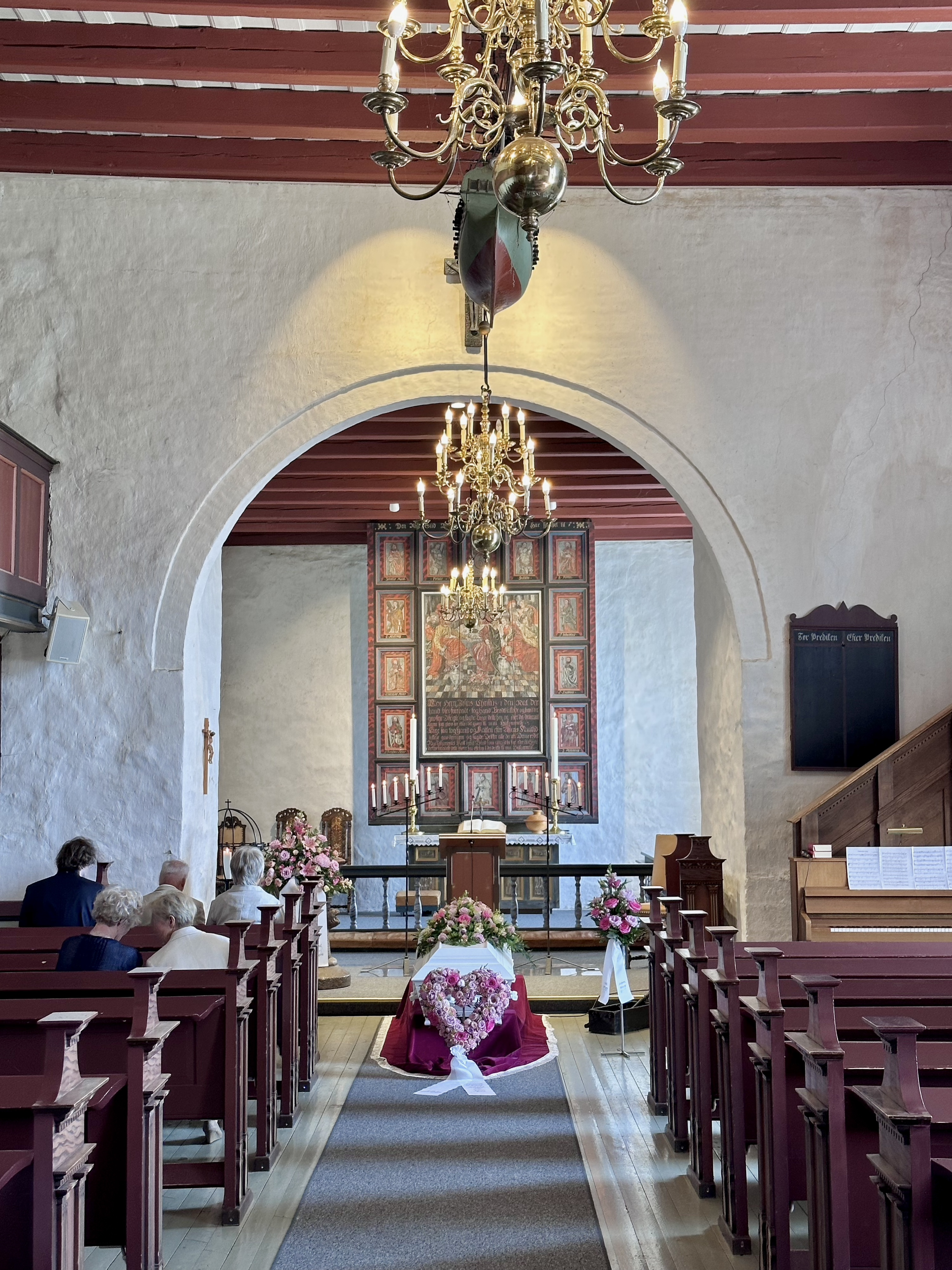

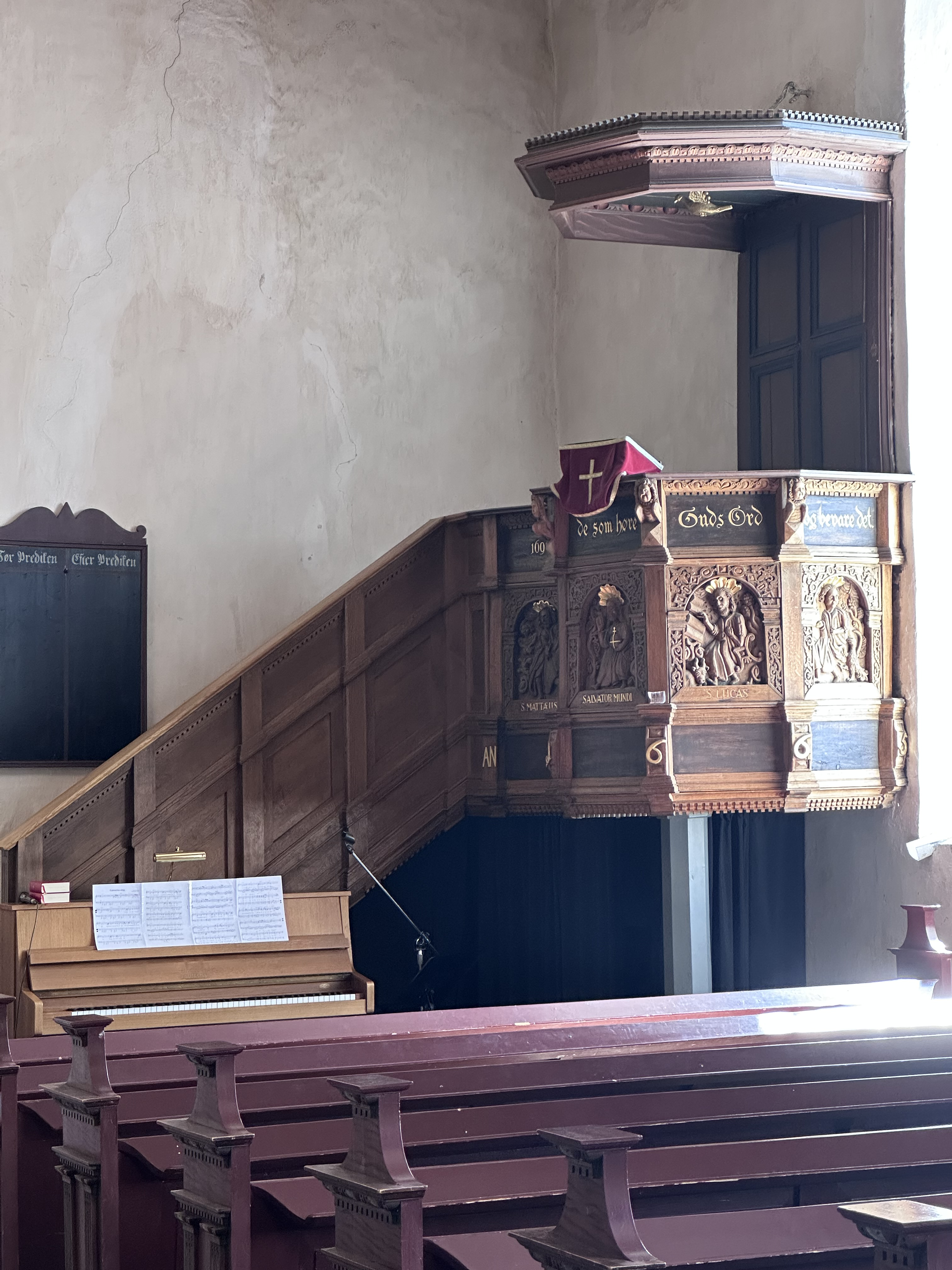

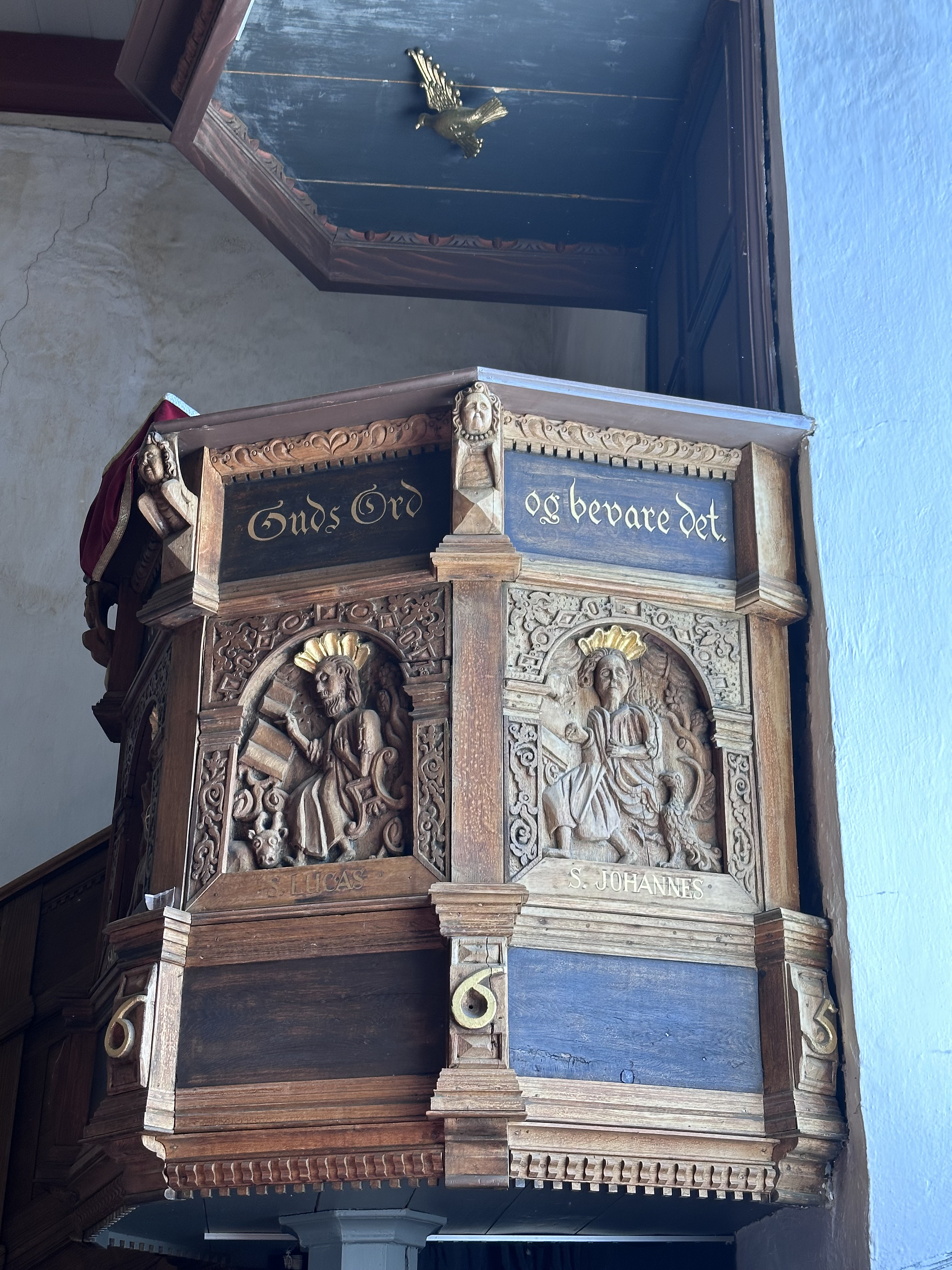

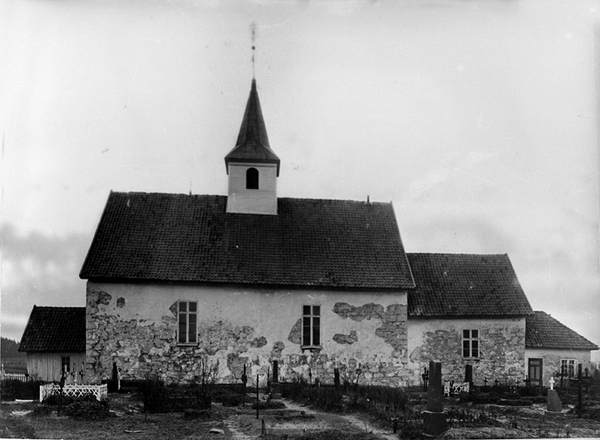

== See also ==
- List of churches in Tunsberg
