= Husøy =

Husøy may refer to:

== Places ==
- Husøy, Senja, an island/village off the coast of Senja in Lenvik municipality, Norway
- Husøy, Solund, an island in Solund municipality, Norway
- Husøy, Træna, the administrative centre of Træna municipality, Norway (also called Husøya)
- Husøy, Tønsberg, an island in Tønsberg municipality, Norway

=== Churches ===
- Husøy Chapel, a chapel in Lenvik municipality, Troms county, Norway
- Husøy Church (Solund) (historically known as Husøy Chapel), a church in Solund municipality, Sogn og Fjordane county, Norway
- Husøy Church (Tønsberg), a church in Tønsberg municipality, Vestfold county, Norway

== People ==
- Inger Lise Husøy, a Norwegian trade unionist and politician
- John Andreas Husøy, a Norwegian footballer who plays for Åsane
- Kari Husøy, a Norwegian politician
