= Vallø Church =

Church in Vestfold, Norway

- Vallø kirke
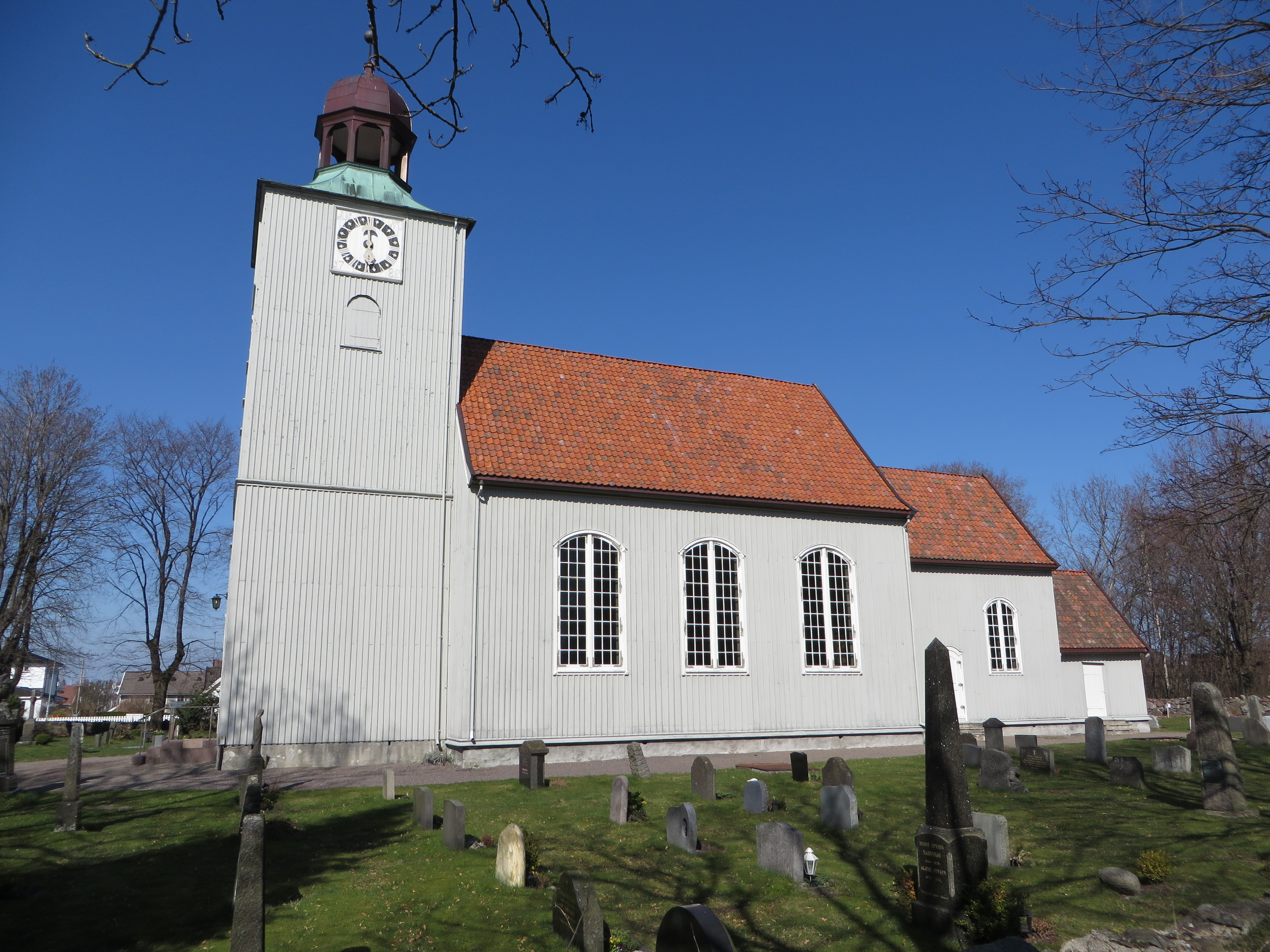
- View of the church
- Vallø Church
- 59°15′41″N 10°29′44″E
- Location: Tønsberg Municipality, Vestfold
- Country: Norway
- Denomination: Church of Norway
- Churchmanship: Evangelical Lutheran

History
- Status: Parish church
- Founded: 1782
- Consecrated: 4 Dec 1782

Architecture
- Functional status: Active
- Architect(s): Johan C. Hvoslef and Jacob Smith
- Architectural type: Long church
- Style: Louis XVI style
- Completed: 1782 (244 years ago)

Specifications
- Capacity: 246
- Materials: Wood

Administration
- Diocese: Tunsberg
- Deanery: Tønsberg domprosti
- Parish: Søndre Slagen
- Norwegian Cultural Heritage Site
- Type: Church
- Status: Listed
- ID: 85753

Vallø Church (Norwegian: Vallø kirke) is a parish church of the Church of Norway in Tønsberg Municipality in Vestfold county, Norway. It is located in the village of Vallø. It is one of the churches for the Søndre Slagen parish which is part of the Tønsberg domprosti (deanery) in the Diocese of Tunsberg. The gray, wooden church was built in a long church design in 1782 using plans drawn up by the architects Johan Christian Hvoslef and Jacob Smith. The church seats about 246 people.

== History ==
Vallø, outside Tønsberg, has been an industrial location throughout history. A saltworks was built there in 1739, and it was during that time that a church was first built at Vallø. This decision was made since the road to Slagen Church was considered too long at a time when the population of the place was increasing. The decision to build the church was made in 1777. A first draft of the plans was drawn up by Johan Christian Hvoslef, but the master builder Jacob Smith who built the church seems to have modified the plans. The church was consecrated by the bishop on 4 December 1782. The new timber-framed building was constructed in the Louis XVI style. The building has a rectangular nave with a smaller chancel with a sacristy on the east end. There is also a church porch and bell tower on the west end. The bell tower has a unique copper-domed top.

== Media gallery ==
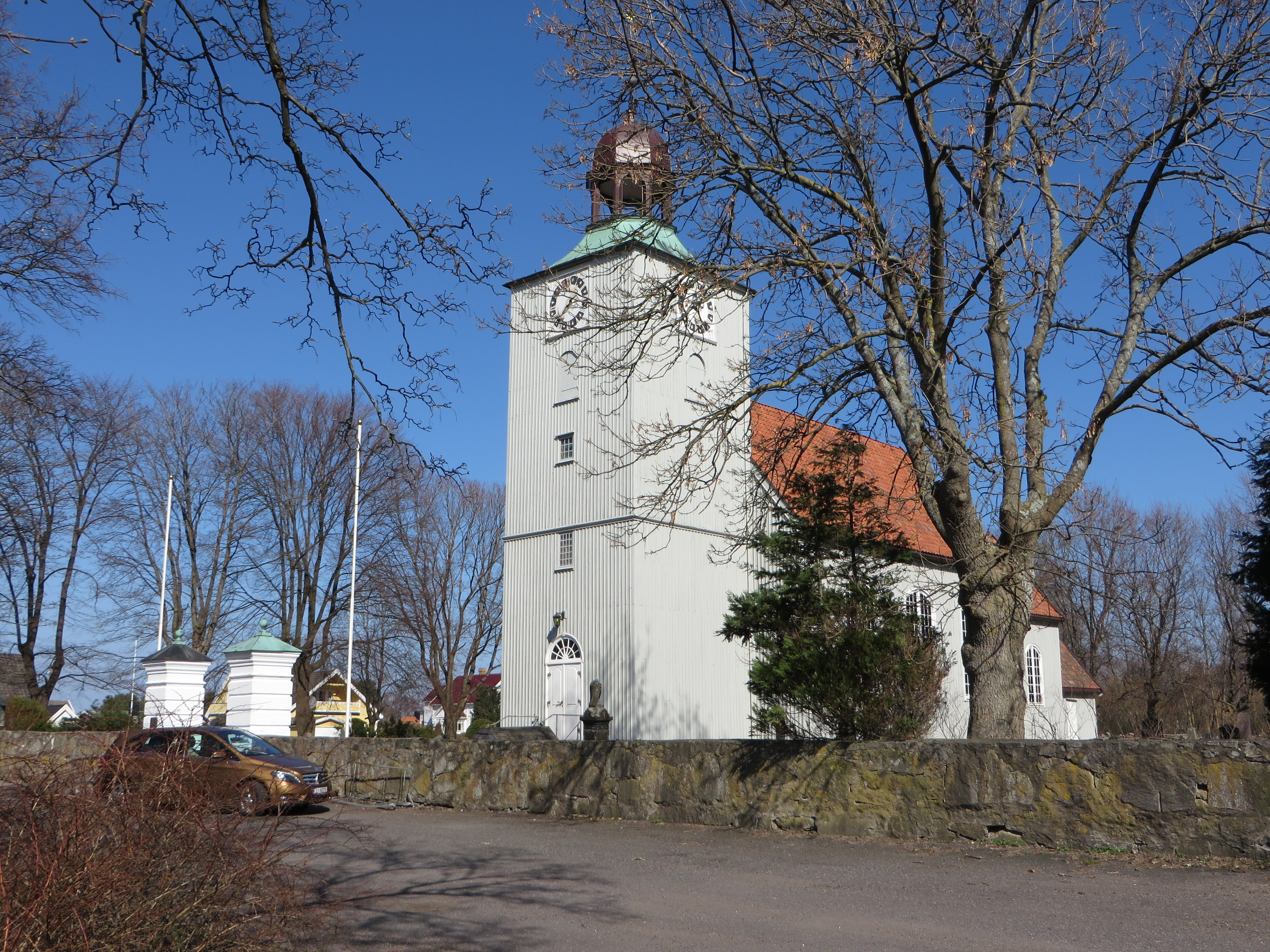

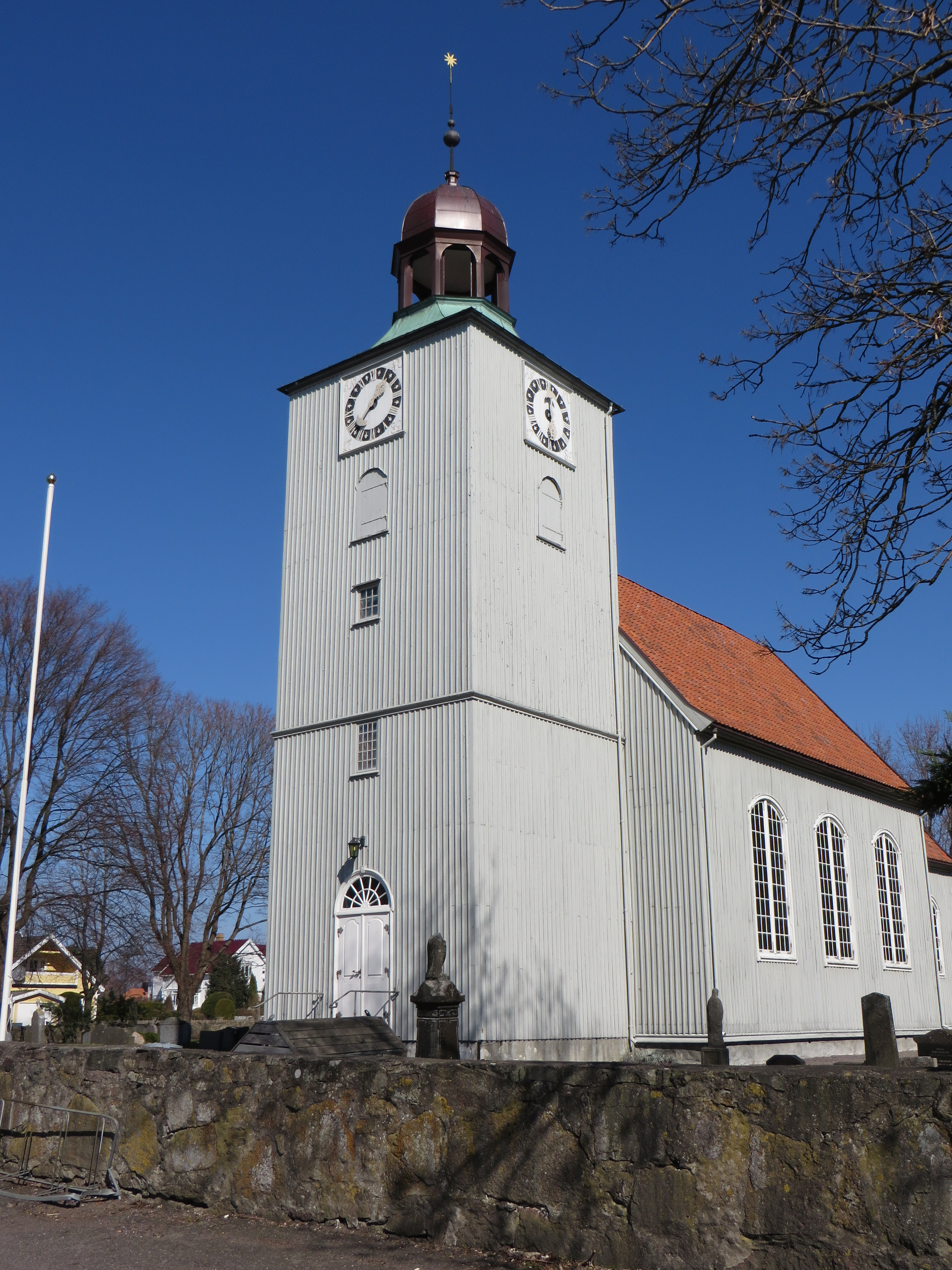

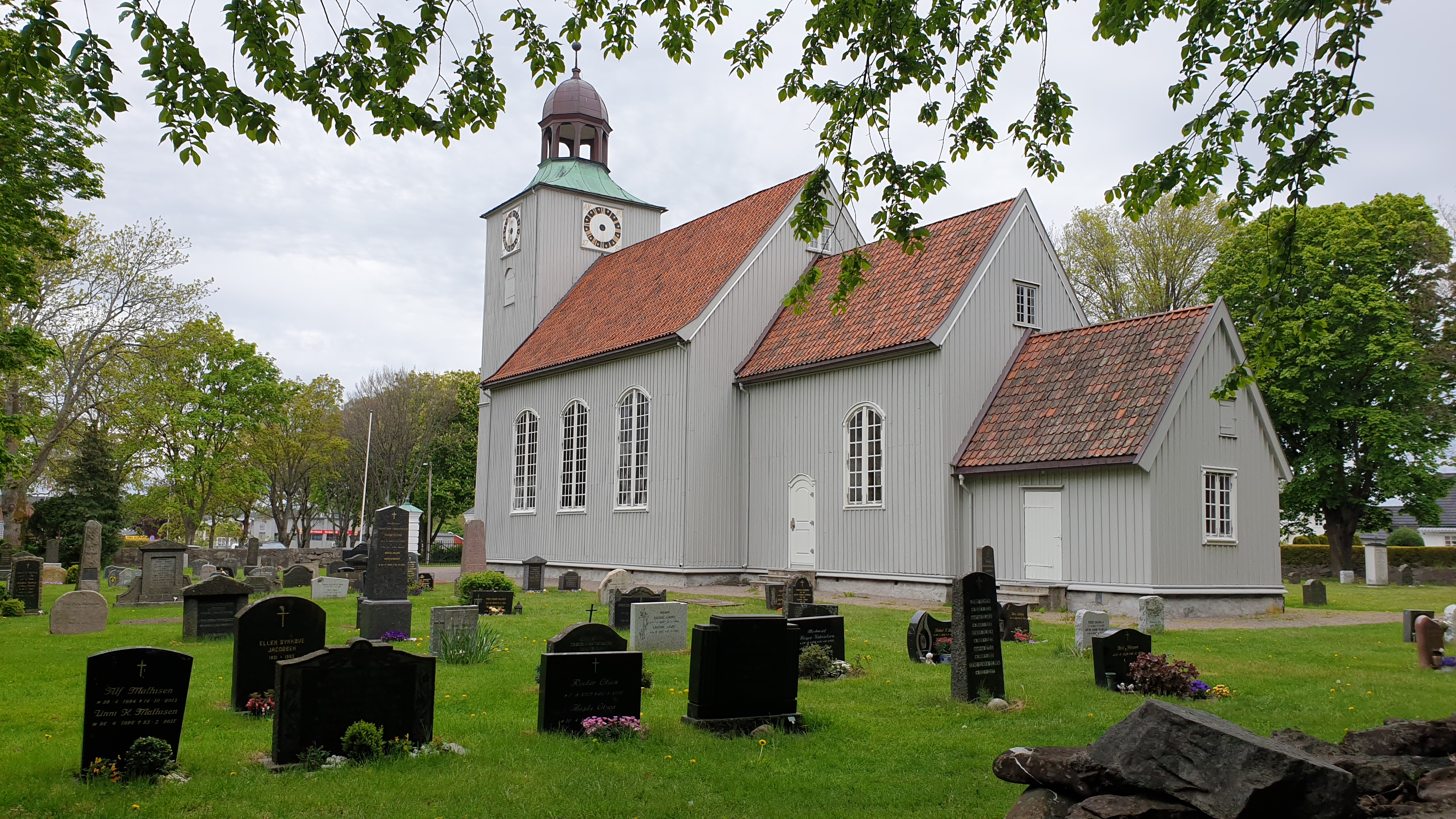

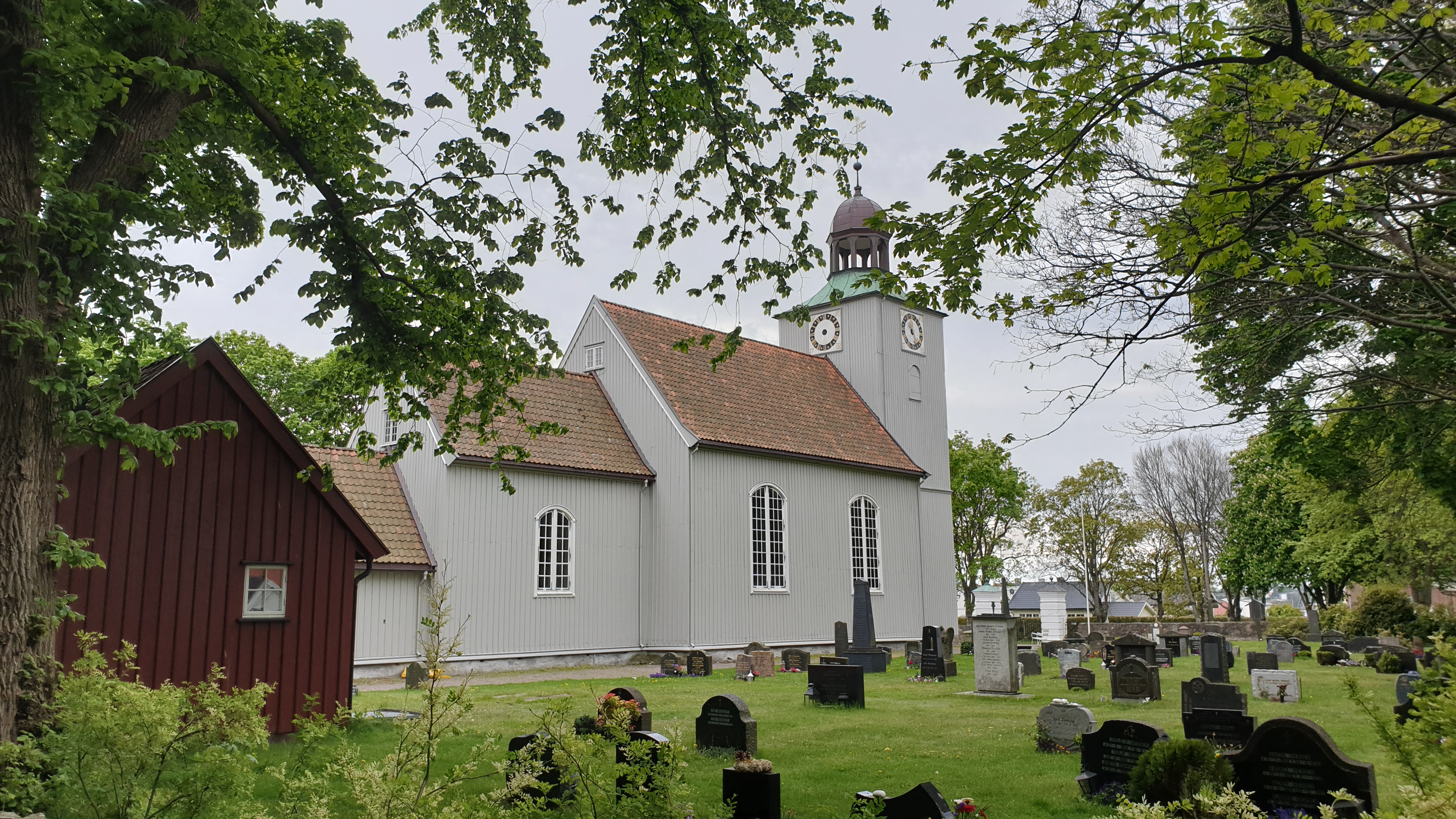

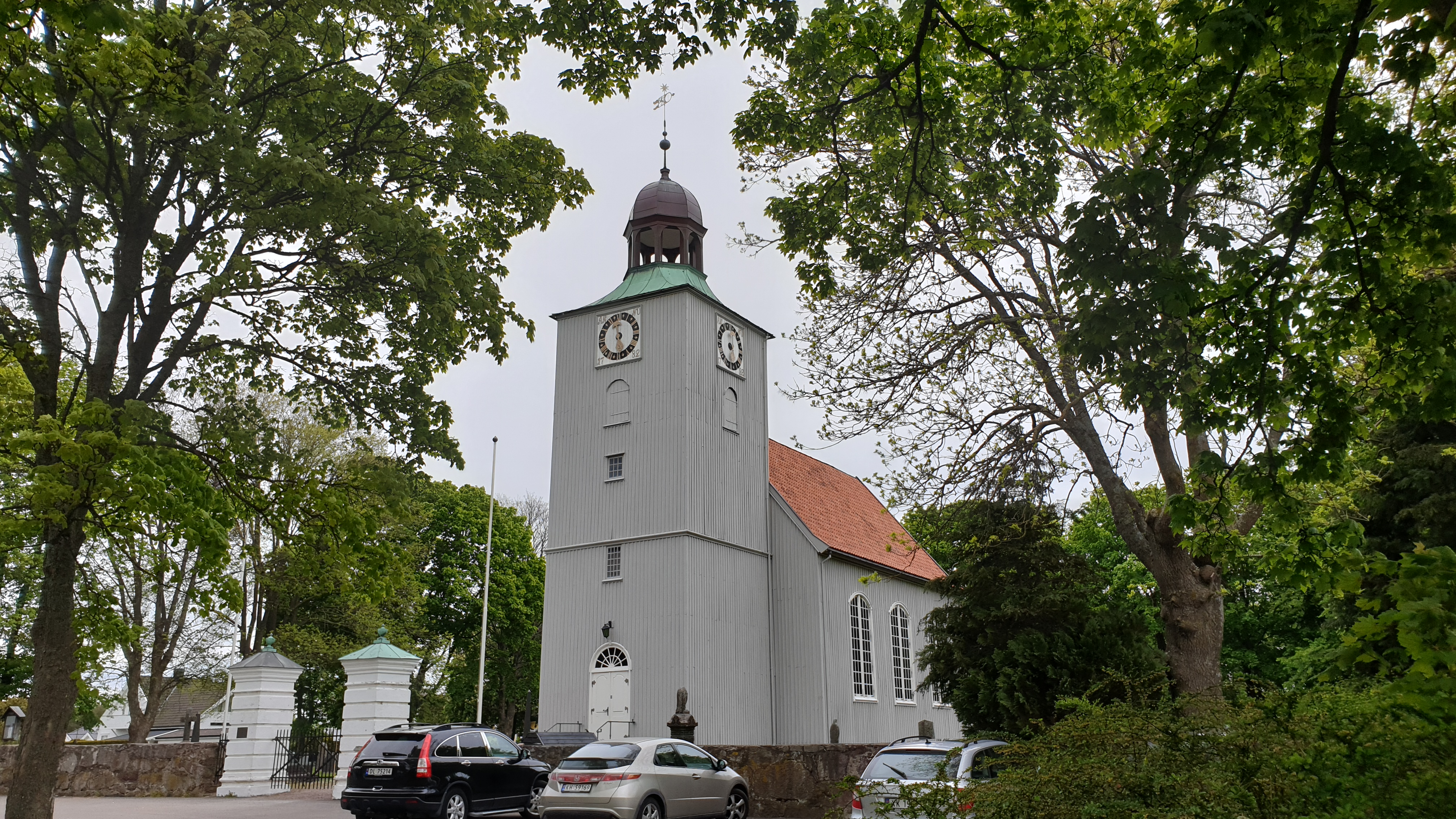

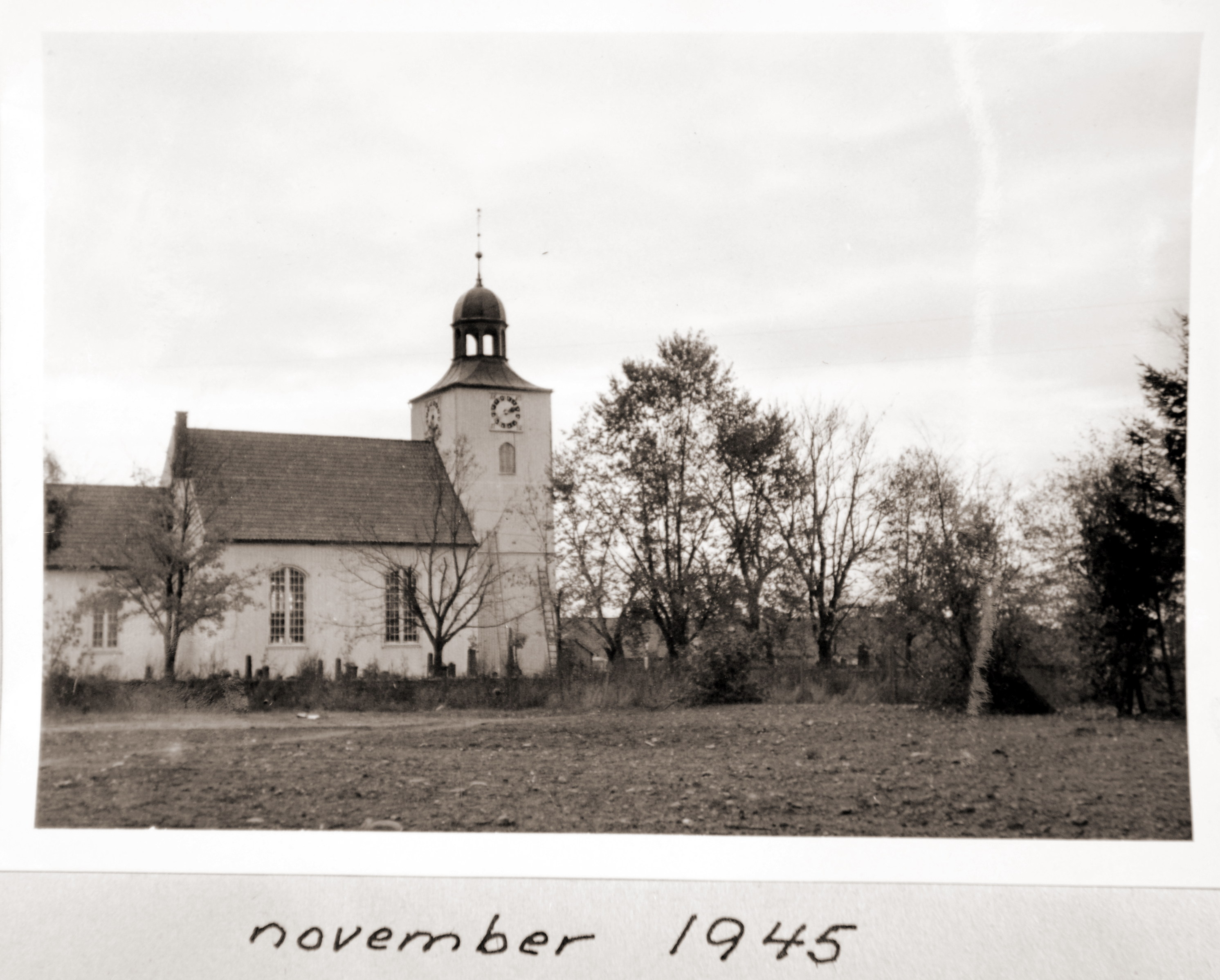

== See also ==
- List of churches in Tunsberg
