= Hans Kristian Hogsnes =

Norwegian journalist and politician

Hans Kristian Hogsnes (17 October 1954 – 30 December 2010) was a Norwegian journalist and politician for the Conservative Party.

He was born in Tønsberg, finished his secondary education here in 1973 before attending Rønningen Folk High School from 1973 to 1974. He worked in the newspaper Tønsbergs Blad from 1975 to 1981 and 1984 to 1995, and edited the Conservative Party official newspaper Høyres avis from 1981 to 1984.

Hogsnes was a member of Sem municipal council from 1975 to 1987, serving as deputy mayor from 1985 to 1987. He also chaired the school board from 1983 to 1987. He then, from 1987 to 1991, became a member of the executive committee of Tønsberg council, after Sem Municipality merged with Tønsberg. From 1995 to 2001 he served as mayor of Tønsberg Municipality, and from 1999 to 2001 he chaired the county branch of the Norwegian Association of Local and Regional Authorities. He chaired Vestfold Conservative Party from 1985 to 1991.

He was elected to the Parliament of Norway from Vestfold in 2001, but was not re-elected in 2005. He was a member of the Standing Committee on Local Government. He had previously served as a deputy representative during the term 1985–1989.
