= Søndre Slagen Church =

Church in Vestfold, Norway

- Søndre Slagen kirke
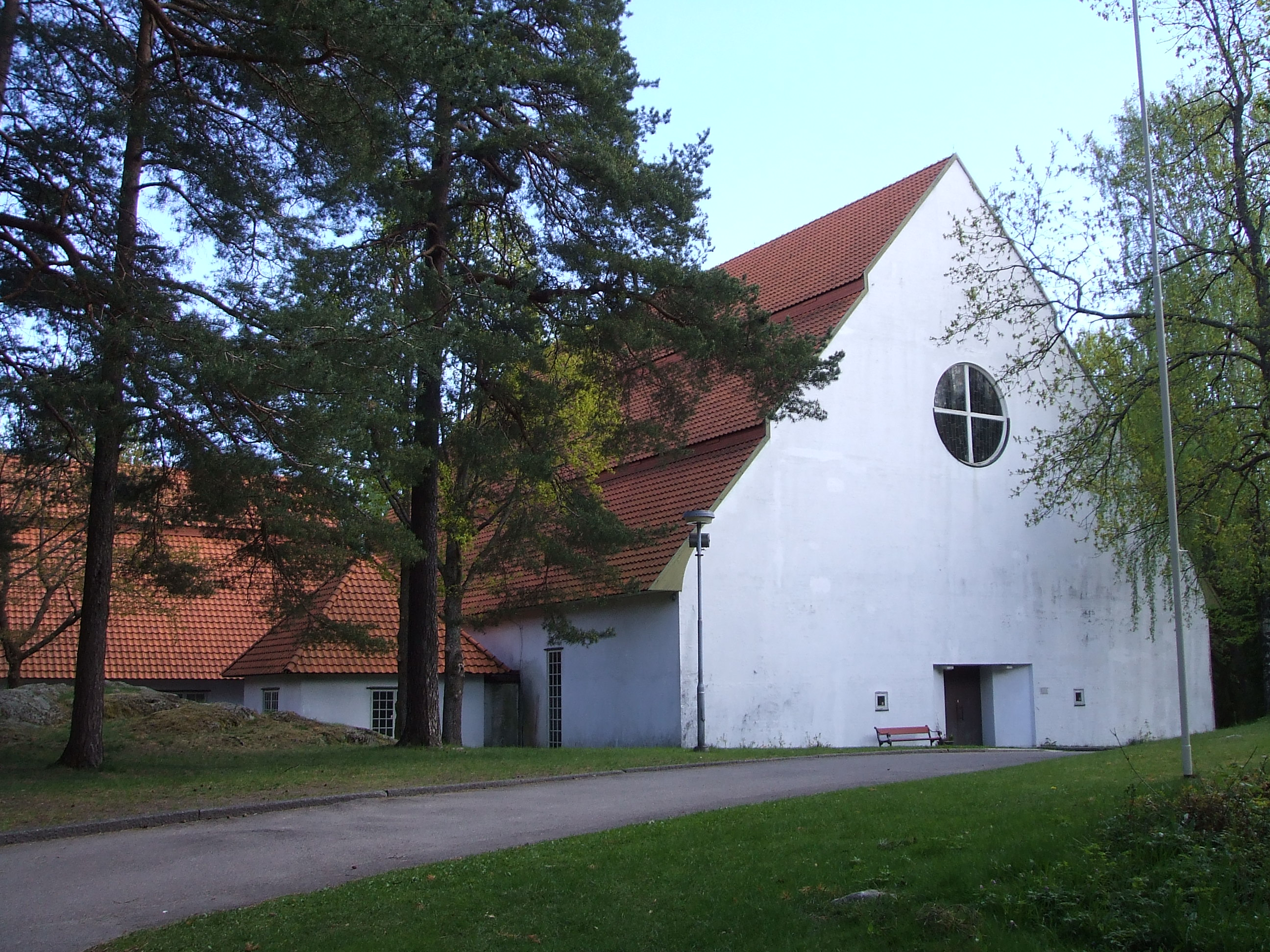
- View of the church
- Søndre Slagen Church
- 59°15′56″N 10°27′36″E
- Location: Tønsberg Municipality, Vestfold
- Country: Norway
- Denomination: Church of Norway
- Churchmanship: Evangelical Lutheran

History
- Status: Parish church
- Founded: 1972
- Consecrated: 12 October 1972

Architecture
- Functional status: Active
- Architect: Olav Stoud Platou
- Architectural type: Long church
- Completed: 1972 (54 years ago)

Specifications
- Capacity: 350
- Materials: Concrete

Administration
- Diocese: Tunsberg
- Deanery: Tønsberg domprosti
- Parish: Søndre Slagen

Søndre Slagen Church (Norwegian: Søndre Slagen kirke) is a parish church of the Church of Norway in Tønsberg Municipality in Vestfold county, Norway. It is located in the town of Tønsberg. It is one of the churches for the Søndre Slagen parish which is part of the Tønsberg domprosti (deanery) in the Diocese of Tunsberg. The white, concrete church was built in a long church design in 1972 using plans drawn up by the architect Olav Stoud Platou who worked for the architectural firm of Arnstein Arneberg. The church seats about 350 people.

== History ==
Planning for the new church began in 1968. Olav Stoud Platou from Arnstein Arneberg's architectural firm was hired to design the building with a medieval look. The new church was completed in 1972 and it was consecrated on 12 October 1972 by the Bishop Dagfinn Hauge. The building is an L-shaped design with the main nave in one wing and the other wing has a congregational hall, classrooms, basement, and office.

== Media gallery ==
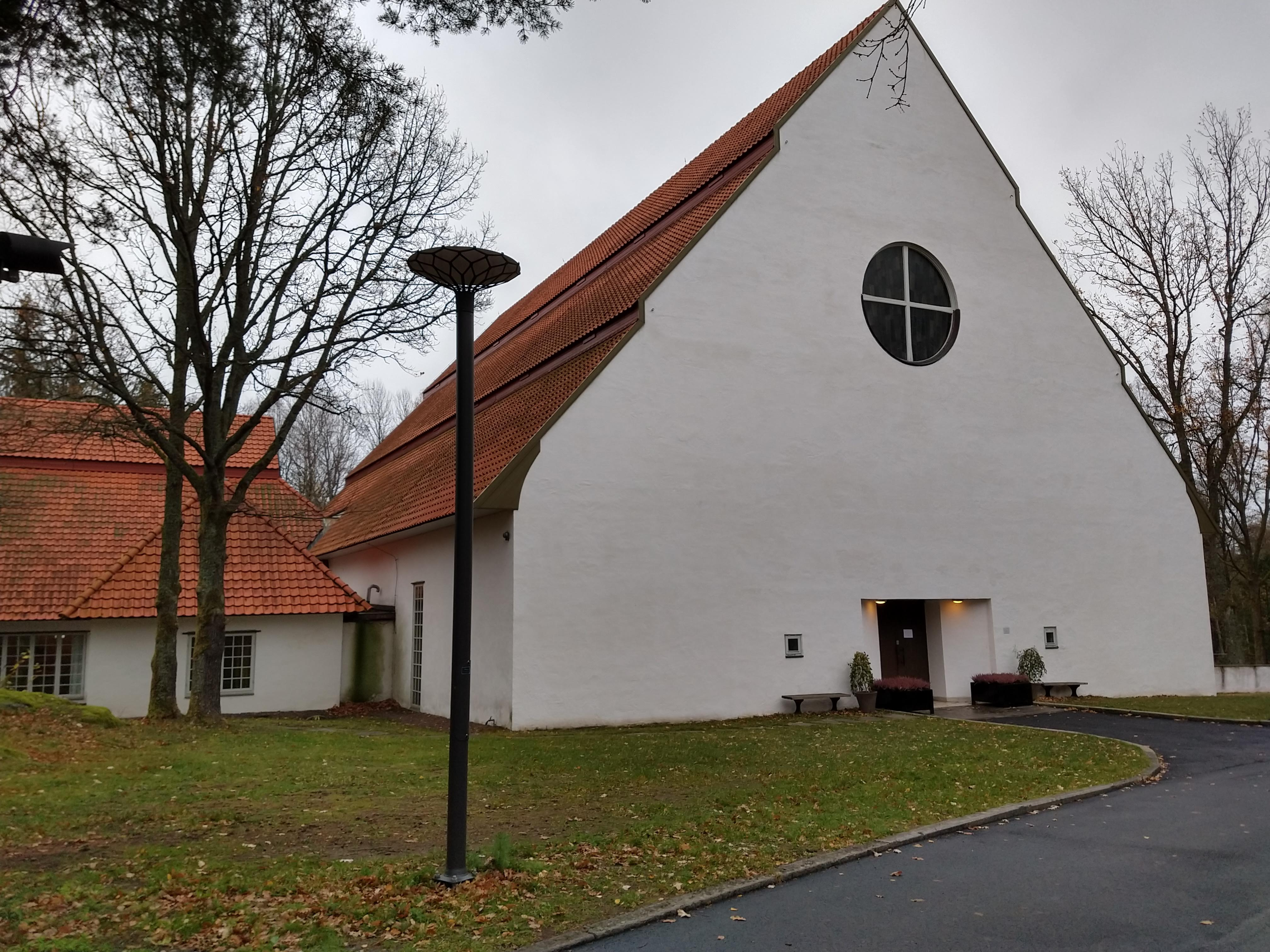

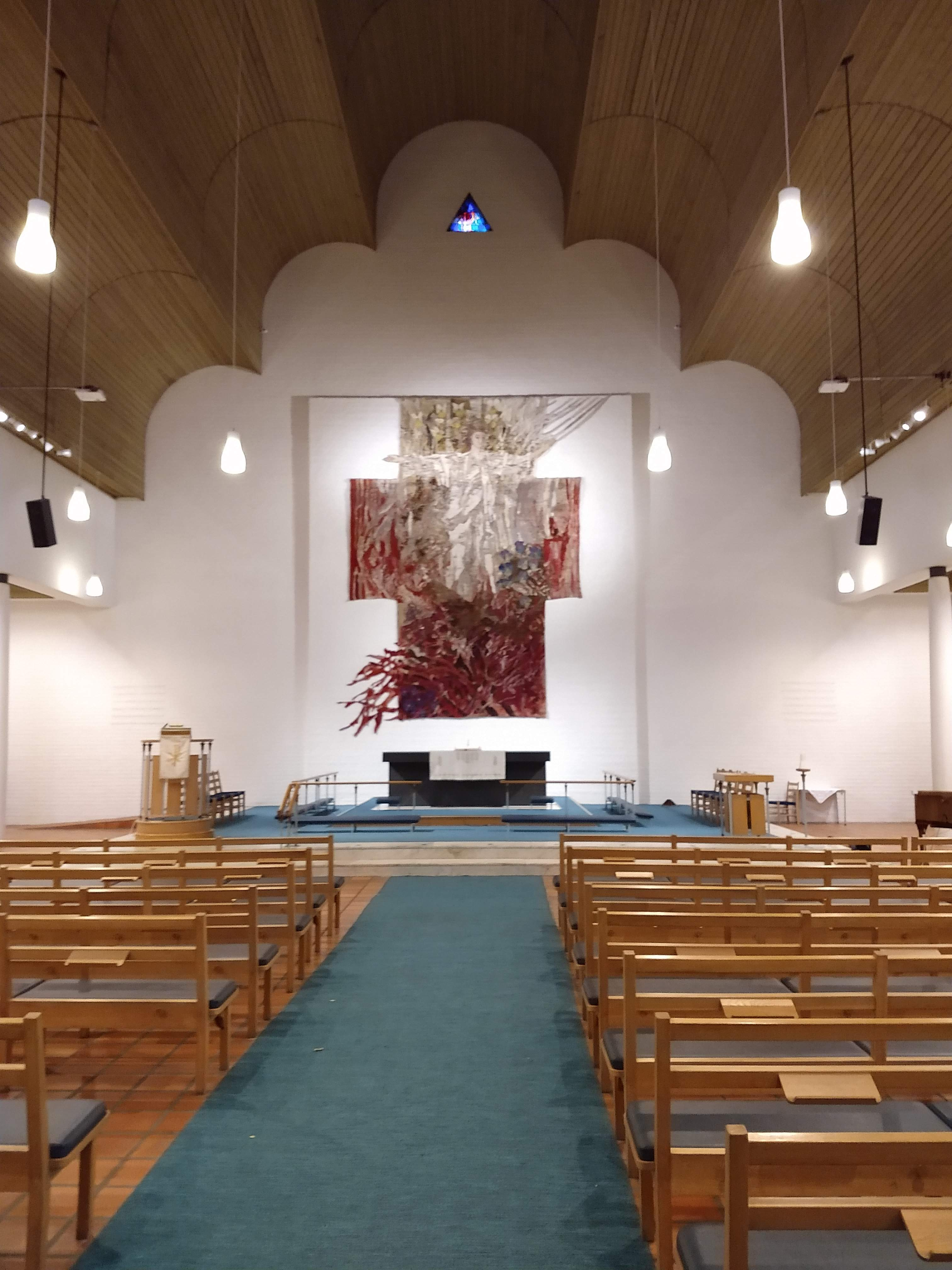

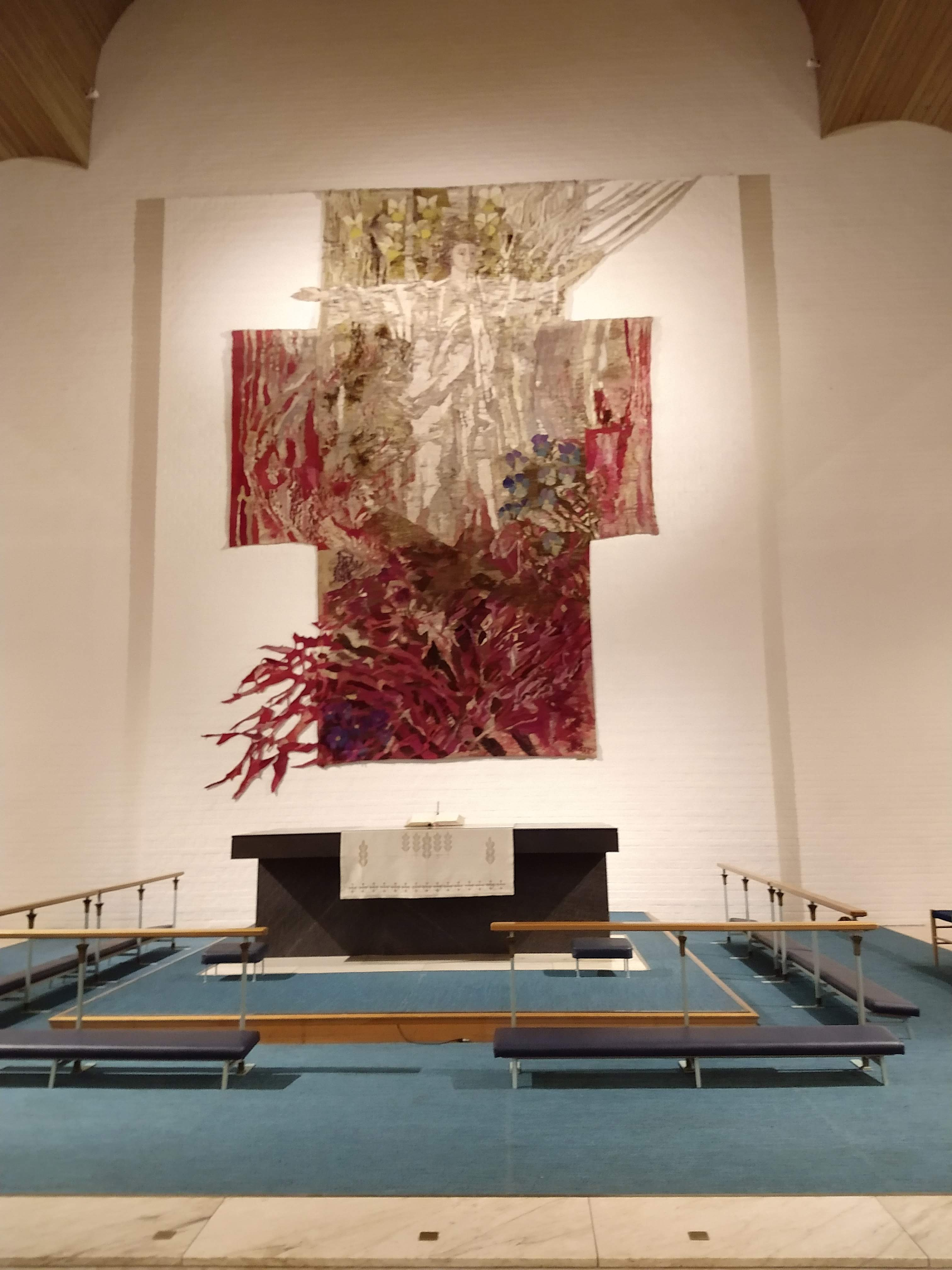

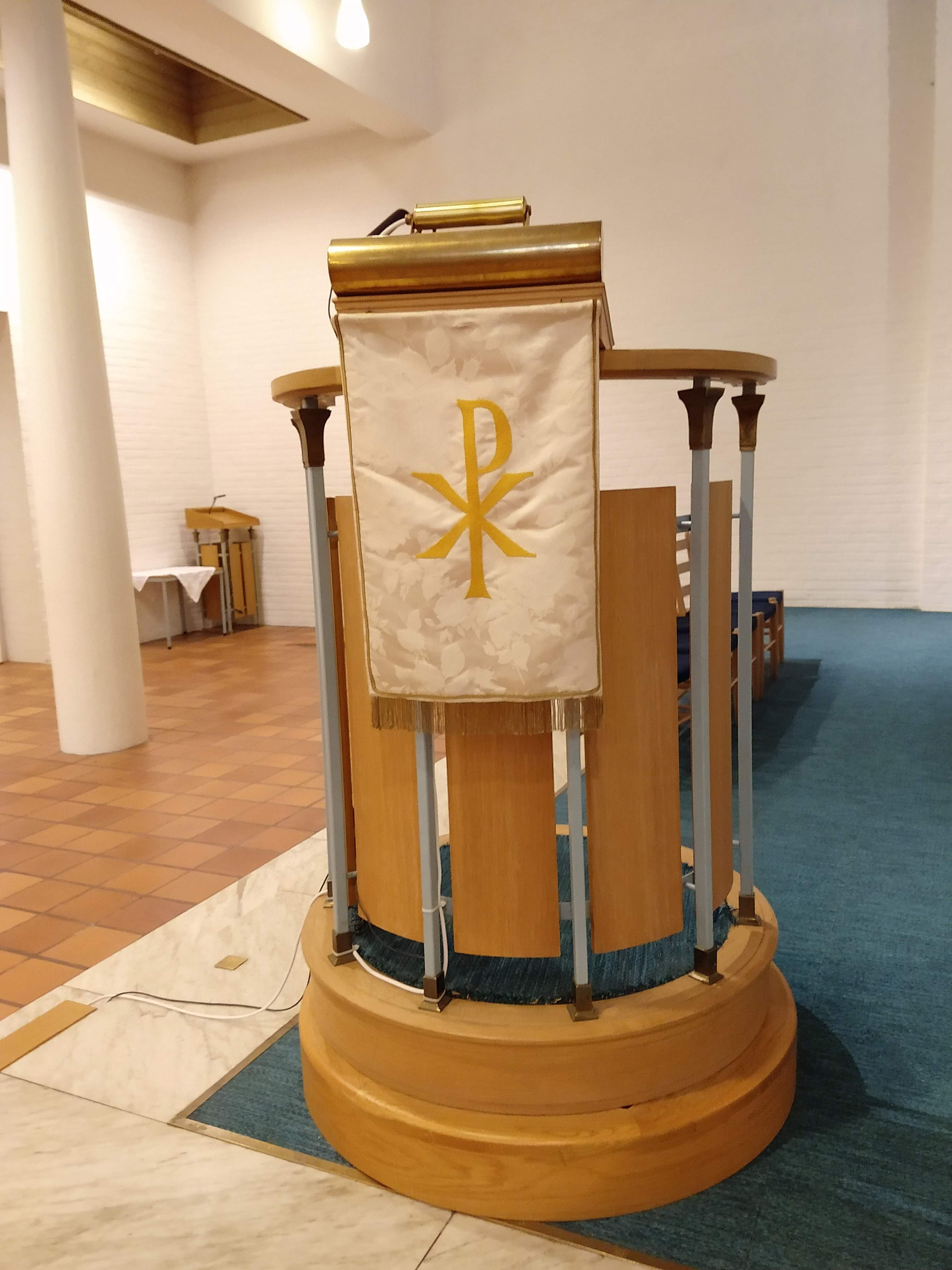

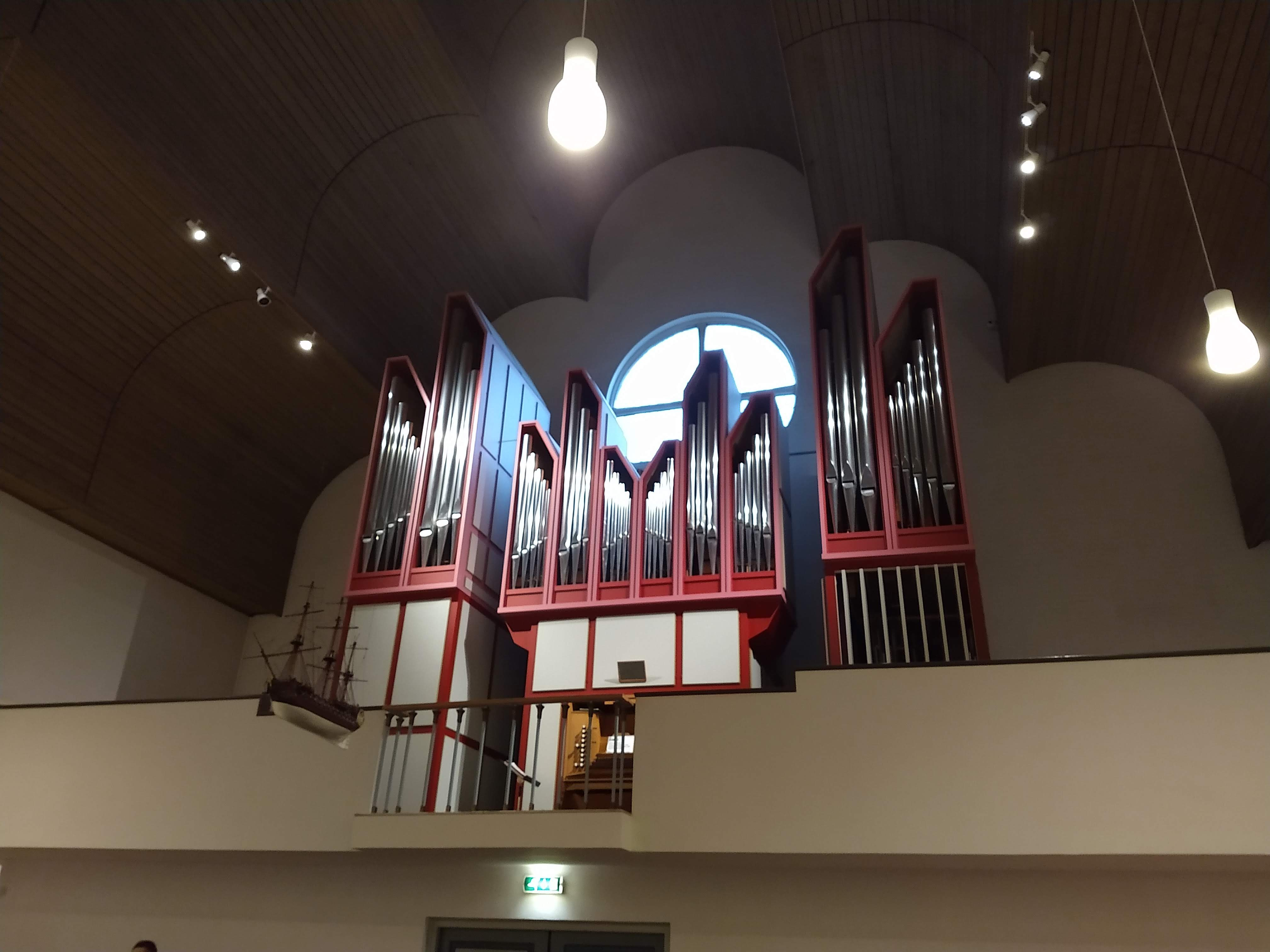

== See also ==
- List of churches in Tunsberg
