= Vear Church =

Church in Vestfold, Norway

- Vear arbeidskirke
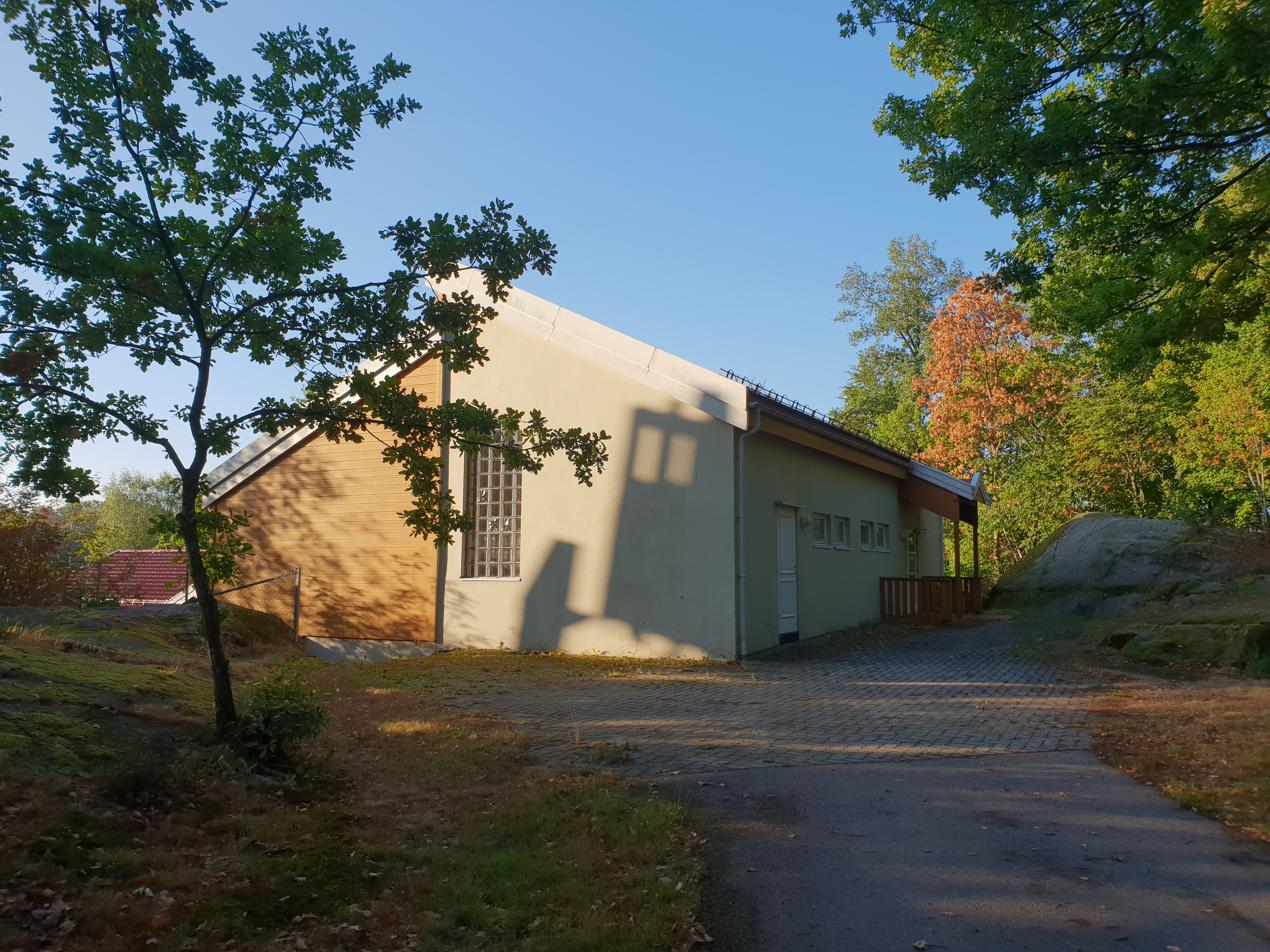
- View of the church
- Vear Church
- 59°15′38″N 10°21′38″E
- Location: Tønsberg Municipality, Vestfold
- Country: Norway
- Denomination: Church of Norway
- Churchmanship: Evangelical Lutheran

History
- Status: Parish church
- Founded: 1993
- Consecrated: 23 Nov 1993

Architecture
- Functional status: Active
- Architect: Birger Tveiten
- Architectural type: Long church
- Completed: 1993 (33 years ago)

Specifications
- Materials: Concrete

Administration
- Diocese: Tunsberg
- Deanery: Tønsberg domprosti
- Parish: Sem
- Norwegian Cultural Heritage Site
- Type: Church
- Status: Not protected

Vear Church (Norwegian: Vear arbeidskirke) is a parish church of the Church of Norway in Tønsberg Municipality in Vestfold county, Norway. It is located in the village of Vear. It is one of the churches for the Sem parish which is part of the Tønsberg domprosti (deanery) in the Diocese of Tunsberg. The church was built in a long church design in 1993 using plans drawn up by the architect Birger Tveiten. The church seats about people.

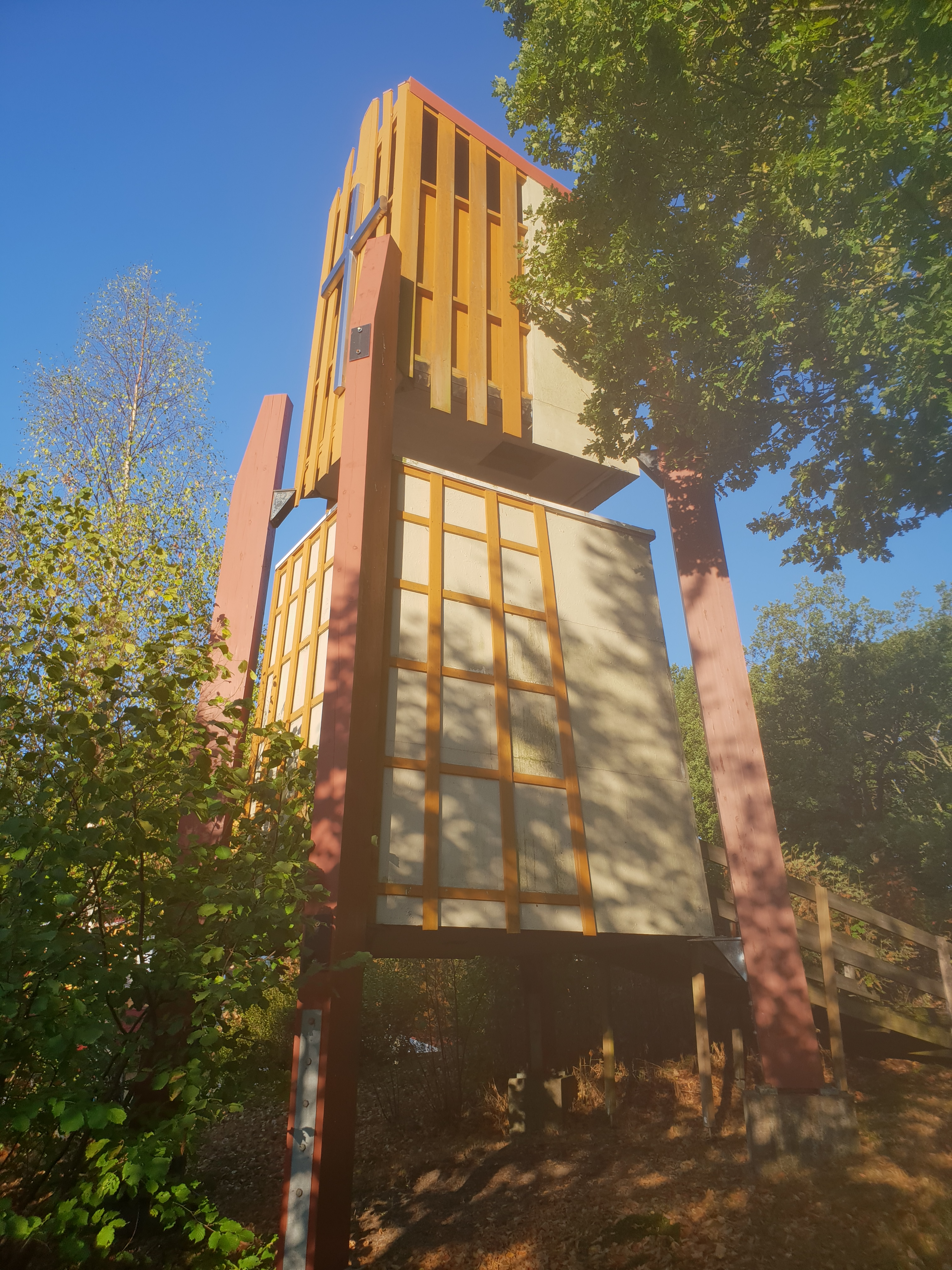
Bell tower

== History ==
Planning for a new chapel in Vear began in the early 1990s. In March 1993, approval to build the chapel was granted. It was built over the summer and it was consecrated on 23 November 1993. The original architectural drawings for the building were drawn up by Elisabet Fidjestøl, but a change of plot and other circumstances required new drawings, and so the architect Birger Tveiten was hired to redesign the building. In 1997, the clock tower was built. The chapel has been renamed as a church in the 20th century. Originally, it was part of the parish of Stokke in Stokke Municipality. On 1 January 2020, it became part of Tønsberg Municipality and the Tønsberg parish.

== See also ==
- List of churches in Tunsberg
