= Husvik, Tønsberg =

Village in Tønsberg, Norway

Husvik
- Village
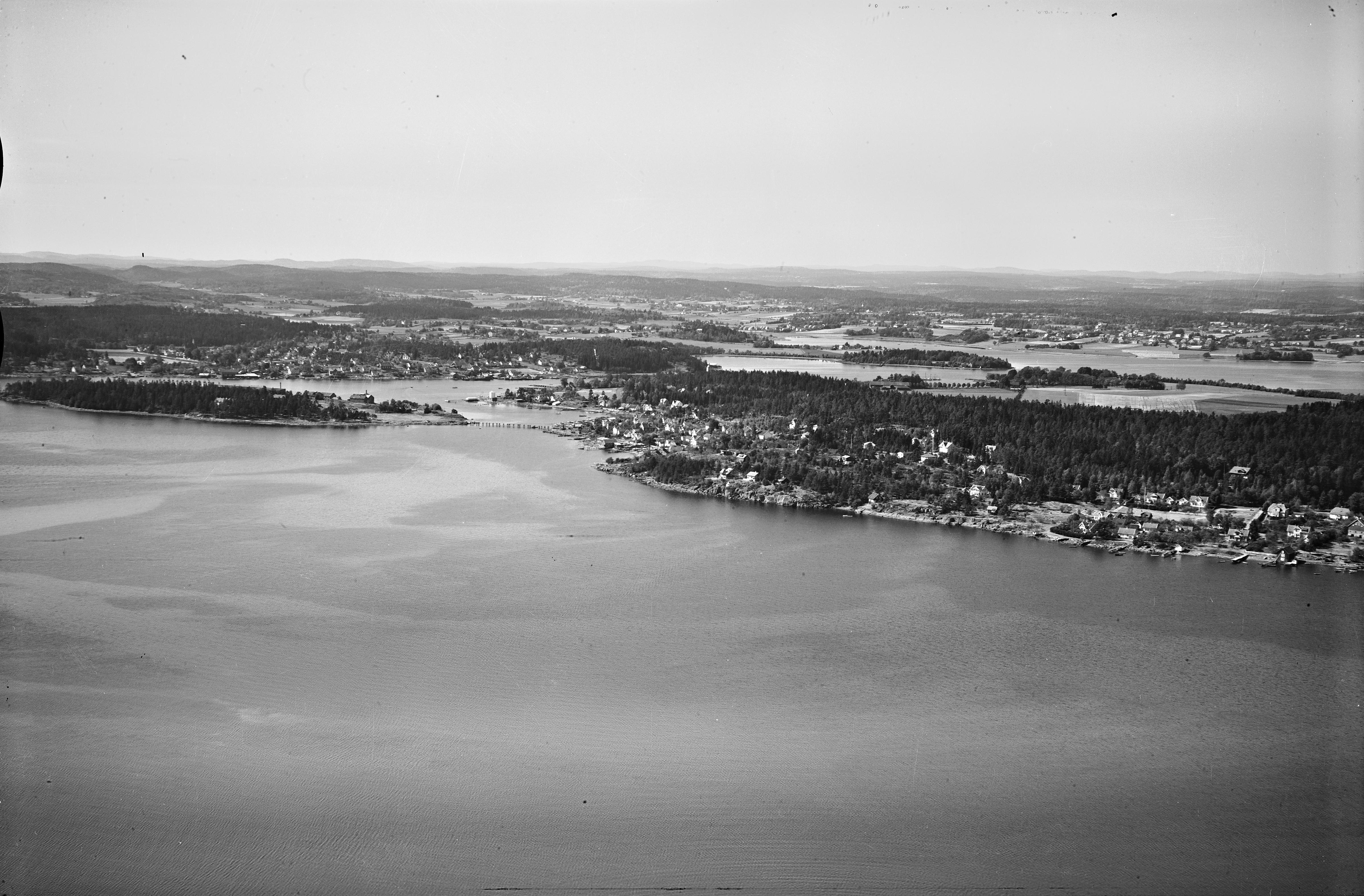
- View of the village
- Interactive map of Husvik
- Coordinates: 59.25204°N 10.47368°E
- Country: Norway
- Region: Eastern Norway
- County: Vestfold
- Municipality: Tønsberg Municipality
- Elevation: 22 m (72 ft)
- Time zone: UTC+01:00 (CET)
  - Summer (DST): UTC+02:00 (CEST)
- Post Code: 3124 Tønsberg

Husvik is a village/neighborhood in Tønsberg Municipality in Vestfold County, Norway, in the eastern coastal area of the city of Tønsberg. It is south of the Klopp and Vallø neighborhoods, and about 4 kilometres (2.5 mi) to the southeast of the centre of the city of Tønsberg.
