= Tønsberg Municipality =

Municipality in Vestfold, Norway

Tønsberg Municipality Tønsberg kommune
- Municipality
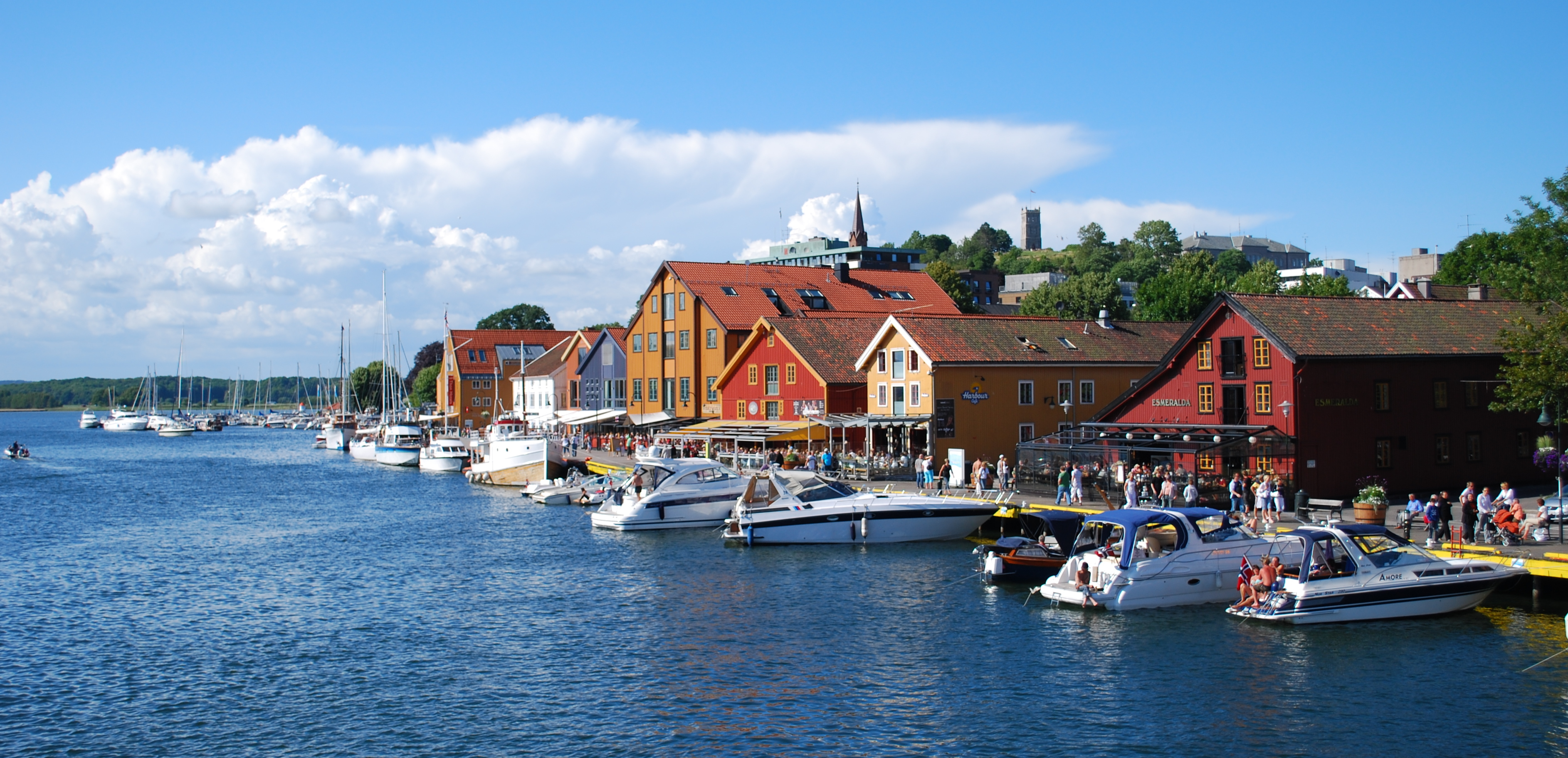

- Flag Coat of arms

- Vestfold within Norway

- Tønsberg within Vestfold
- Coordinates: 59°17′53″N 10°25′25″E
- Country: Norway
- County: Vestfold
- District: Jarlsberg
- Established: 1 Jan 1838
  - Created as: Formannskapsdistrikt
- Administrative centre: Tønsberg

Government
  - Mayor (2023): Frank Pedersen ((H))

Area
  - Total: 329.26 km^{2} (127.13 sq mi)
  - Land: 326.11 km^{2} (125.91 sq mi)
  - Water: 3.15 km^{2} (1.22 sq mi) 1%
  - Rank: #254 in Norway
- Highest elevation (Snippane): 399.97 m (1,312.2 ft)

Population (2026)
  - Total: 60,246
  - Rank: #16 in Norway
  - Density: 184.7/km^{2} (478/sq mi)
  - Change (10 years): ▲ +16.7%
- Demonym(s): Tønsbergenser; Tønsbergensar

Official language
  - Norwegian form: Neutral
- Time zone: UTC+01:00 (CET)
  - Summer (DST): UTC+02:00 (CEST)
- ISO 3166 code: NO-3905
- Website: Official website

Tønsberg (pronounced [ˈtœ̂nsbær(ɡ)]; locally [ˈtœ̂nsbææʁ]) is a municipality in Vestfold county, Norway. It is located in the traditional district of Jarlsberg. The administrative centre of the municipality is the city of Tønsberg which was established in the 9th century. Other larger population centres in the municipality include Barkåker, Bergsåsen, Brekkeåsen, Eik, Fon, Gretteåsen, Husøy, Husvik, Linnestad, Ramnes, Rånerudåsen, Revetal, Sem, Svinevoll, Teie, and Vear.

The 329-square-kilometre (127 sq mi) municipality is the 254th largest by area out of the 357 municipalities in Norway. Tønsberg is the 16th most populous municipality in Norway with a population of 60,246. The municipality's population density is 184.7 inhabitants per square kilometre (478/sq mi) and its population has increased by 16.7% over the previous 10-year period.

Tønsberg Municipality is home to Tønsberg Fortress on Castle Mountain, which includes ruins from Castrum Tunsbergis, Norway's largest castle in the 13th century. Tønsberg is also home of Oseberg Mound, where the 9th-century Oseberg Ship was excavated. The large city of Tønsberg was founded in the 9th century, one of the oldest cities in Norway, and it is also the 9th largest city in Norway.

== General information ==
=== Administrative history ===
The formannskapsdistrikt law of 1837 created a system of local government in Norway by establishing each town (ladested or kjøpstad) and each Church of Norway prestegjeld as a civil municipality. On 1 January 1838, the kjøpstad of Tønsberg was established as Tønsberg Municipality.

On 1 January 1877, the growing Tønsberg Municipality was enlarged by taking an area from Sem Municipality (population: 61) and another area from Nøtterøy Municipality (population: 102). On 1 January 1980, an unpopulated area of Nøtterøy Municipality was transferred to the town of Tønsberg.

On 1 January 1988, the large Sem Municipality (population: 21,948) was dissolved and merged with Tønsberg Municipality (population: 8,896) to form a much larger Tønsberg Municipality. On 1 January 2017, the village of Vear was transferred from Stokke Municipality to the neighboring Tønsberg Municipality.

In 2020, there were many municipal and county mergers across Norway due to the work of the Solberg cabinet. On 1 January 2020, the large Re Municipality (population: 9,730) was dissolved and merged with Tønsberg Municipality (population: 45,976) to form a larger Tønsberg Municipality. Historically, this municipality was part of Vestfold county. Also, on 1 January 2020, the municipality became a part of the newly-formed Vestfold og Telemark county (after Telemark and Vestfold counties were merged). The merger was shortlived, and on 1 January 2024, the merger was undone and this municipality became part of Vestfold county once again.

=== Name ===
The municipality is named after the old town of Tønsberg (Old Norse: Túnsberg) since the first Tønsberg Church was built there centuries ago. The first element is the genitive case of tún (n) which means "fenced area", "garden", or "field around a dwelling". The last element is berg (n) which means "mountain" or "rock". The name originally referred to the fortifications on Slottsfjellet. The old spelling of the name has been retained in the name of the local diocese, Tunsberg bispedømme.

=== Coat of arms ===
For a long time, the city and municipality did not have a formal coat of arms, but instead an old medieval seal dating back to 1349 was used in its place. The blue and white circular seal shows the Tønsberg Fortress surrounded by a ring wall on a mountain with the sea in front. There is also a longship in the water in front of the fortress. Around the seal are the Latin words SIGILLVM BVRGENSIVM D'TVNESBER which means "This is the seal of Tunsberg".

In preparation for the merger of Re Municipality and Tønsberg Municipality, a new coat of arms was adopted in 2018 for use starting on 1 January 2020. The blazon is "Per pale argent a longship stem azure and azure a seedling argent". This means the arms are divided with a vertical line. The field (background) to the right of the line has a tincture of azure. To the right of the line, the field has a tincture of argent which means it is commonly colored white, but if it is made out of metal, then silver is used. There are two charges on the arms. The charge on the left side is a longship stem, symbolizing the one on the Oseberg Ship and the great Viking Age history in the area. This stem has a tincture of azure. The charge on the right side is a seedling, symbolizing local agriculture. This seedling or sprout has a tincture of argent which means it is commonly colored white, but if it is made out of metal, then silver is used.

Coats of arms of Tønsberg

Current coat of arms
(1 Jan 2020–present)

Former coat of arms
(1349–31 Dec 2019)

=== Churches ===
The Church of Norway has nine parishes (sokn) within Tønsberg Municipality. It is part of the Tønsberg domprosti (arch-deanery) in the Diocese of Tunsberg.

Churches in Tønsberg Municipality
Parish (sokn)	Church name	Location of the church	Year built
Tønsberg domkirke	Tønsberg Cathedral	Tønsberg	1858
Tønsberg domkirke	Solvang Church	Tønsberg	1969
Fon	Fon Church	Fon	c. 1100
Ramnes	Ramnes Church	Ramnes	c. 1100
Sem	Sem Church	Jarlsberg farm	c. 1100
Sem	Vear Church	Vear	1993
Slagen	Slagen Church	Slagen, east of Eik	1901
Søndre Slagen	Husøy Church	Husøy	1933
Søndre Slagen	Søndre Slagen Church	Tønsberg	1972
Søndre Slagen	Vallø Church	Vallø	1782
Undrumsdal	Undrumsdal Church	Undrumsdal	1882
Vivestad	Vivestad Church	Vivestad	1914
Våle	Våle Church	Bergsåsen	c. 1100

== History ==
The city of Tønsberg has existed for centuries. On 1 January 1838, the formannskapsdistrikt law went into effect, making all cities and rural parishes across Norway into civil municipalities with self-governing councils. The city of Tønsberg was surrounded by Sem Municipality for many years until 1988 when Sem Municipality and the city of Tønsberg were merged, creating a new Tønsberg Municipality with a much larger size and population than the city was before the merger. The city continued on as the administrative centre of the new municipality. In 2017, the village of Vear was transferred into Tønsberg Municipality from Stokke Municipality. In 2020, the neighboring Re Municipality was merged with Tønsberg Municipality, more than doubling its size again. The new Tønsberg Municipality included much more rural area than urban area, with most of the urban settlements in and around the city of Tønsberg in the far southern part of the newly merged municipality.

== Economy ==
Since the municipality was enlarged, Tønsberg is now the largest agricultural municipality, with an agricultural area of about 117,000 decares (117 km^{2}; 45 sq mi) (2018). Cereal cultivation dominates, but vegetable production is significant. Tønsberg is the municipality in Vestfold that has the highest number of cattle (both dairy and meat cows). In forestry, 43,000 cubic metres (1,500,000 cu ft) of trees were harvested in 2018, about 80% of which was spruce.

The city of Tønsberg has long traditions in shipping, industry, and trade. Today, the municipal business-base is predominantly small and medium-sized companies. The most important industries are the food industry, including a large slaughterhouse (Nortura) and a large dairy (Tine), as well as a flatbread factory. The workshop industry is also significant, particularly the metal goods industry. Esso's refinery at Slagentangen was closed in 2021. There is also a large silverware factory and the country's only bell foundry at Nauen in Sem (Olsen Nauen Bell Foundry). The most important industrial areas are located along the Canal and the adjacent areas of Byfjorden, both on the mainland and the Nøtterøy side. Important industrial areas are also found along the Oslofjord from Husøy and northwards to Vallø and Slagentangen. There is also a lot of summer tourism along the coast.

== Population ==
Historical population
Year	1845	1855	1865	1875	1891	1900	1910	1920	1930	1946	1951	1960	1970	1980	1990	2000	2010	2020	2026
Pop.	2,245	2,874	4,541	5,174	7,215	8,611	9,769	12,568	11,997	11,883	12,208	12,591	11,284	9,247	31,275	34,716	39,367	56,293	60,246
±% p.a.	—	+2.50%	+4.68%	+1.31%	+2.10%	+1.98%	+1.27%	+2.55%	−0.46%	−0.06%	+0.54%	+0.34%	−1.09%	−1.97%	+12.96%	+1.05%	+1.27%	+3.64%	+1.14%
Note: The municipal borders were changed in 1988 and 2020, causing a significant change in the population. Source: Statistics Norway and Norwegian Historical Data Centre

== Government ==
Tønsberg Municipality is responsible for primary education (through 10th grade), outpatient health services, senior citizen services, welfare and other social services, zoning, economic development, and municipal roads and utilities. The municipality is governed by a municipal council of directly elected representatives. The mayor is indirectly elected by a vote of the municipal council. The municipality is under the jurisdiction of the Vestfold District Court and the Agder Court of Appeal.

=== Municipal council ===
The municipal council (Kommunestyre) of Tønsberg Municipality is made up of 43 representatives that are elected to four-year terms. The tables below show the current and historical composition of the council by political party.

Tønsberg kommunestyre 2023–2027
Party name (in Norwegian)	Number of representatives
Labour Party (Arbeiderpartiet)	10
Progress Party (Fremskrittspartiet)	5
Green Party (Miljøpartiet De Grønne)	2
Conservative Party (Høyre)	14
Industry and Business Party (Industri‑ og Næringspartiet)	2
Christian Democratic Party (Kristelig Folkeparti)	2
Red Party (Rødt)	1
Centre Party (Senterpartiet)	2
Socialist Left Party (Sosialistisk Venstreparti)	3
Liberal Party (Venstre)	2
Total number of members:	43

Tønsberg kommunestyre 2019–2023
Party name (in Norwegian)	Number of representatives
Labour Party (Arbeiderpartiet)	13
Progress Party (Fremskrittspartiet)	5
Green Party (Miljøpartiet De Grønne)	4
Conservative Party (Høyre)	13
Christian Democratic Party (Kristelig Folkeparti)	2
Red Party (Rødt)	1
Centre Party (Senterpartiet)	6
Socialist Left Party (Sosialistisk Venstreparti)	3
Liberal Party (Venstre)	2
Total number of members:	49

Tønsberg kommunestyre 2015–2019
Party name (in Norwegian)	Number of representatives
Labour Party (Arbeiderpartiet)	14
Progress Party (Fremskrittspartiet)	5
Green Party (Miljøpartiet De Grønne)	2
Conservative Party (Høyre)	11
Christian Democratic Party (Kristelig Folkeparti)	2
Centre Party (Senterpartiet)	1
Socialist Left Party (Sosialistisk Venstreparti)	2
Liberal Party (Venstre)	2
Total number of members:	39

Tønsberg kommunestyre 2011–2015
Party name (in Norwegian)	Number of representatives
Labour Party (Arbeiderpartiet)	13
Progress Party (Fremskrittspartiet)	4
Conservative Party (Høyre)	15
Christian Democratic Party (Kristelig Folkeparti)	2
Centre Party (Senterpartiet)	1
Socialist Left Party (Sosialistisk Venstreparti)	2
Liberal Party (Venstre)	2
Total number of members:	39

Tønsberg kommunestyre 2007–2011
Party name (in Norwegian)	Number of representatives
Labour Party (Arbeiderpartiet)	10
Progress Party (Fremskrittspartiet)	12
Conservative Party (Høyre)	8
Christian Democratic Party (Kristelig Folkeparti)	2
Centre Party (Senterpartiet)	1
Socialist Left Party (Sosialistisk Venstreparti)	3
Liberal Party (Venstre)	2
City list against toll roads (Bylisten mot bomring)	1
Total number of members:	39

Tønsberg kommunestyre 2003–2007
Party name (in Norwegian)	Number of representatives
Labour Party (Arbeiderpartiet)	9
Progress Party (Fremskrittspartiet)	16
Conservative Party (Høyre)	6
Christian Democratic Party (Kristelig Folkeparti)	3
Centre Party (Senterpartiet)	1
Socialist Left Party (Sosialistisk Venstreparti)	8
Liberal Party (Venstre)	1
Tønsberg List (Tønsberglisten)	5
Total number of members:	49

Tønsberg kommunestyre 1999–2003
Party name (in Norwegian)	Number of representatives
Labour Party (Arbeiderpartiet)	11
Progress Party (Fremskrittspartiet)	10
Conservative Party (Høyre)	14
Christian Democratic Party (Kristelig Folkeparti)	5
Centre Party (Senterpartiet)	1
Socialist Left Party (Sosialistisk Venstreparti)	6
Liberal Party (Venstre)	2
Total number of members:	49

Tønsberg kommunestyre 1995–1999
Party name (in Norwegian)	Number of representatives
Labour Party (Arbeiderpartiet)	14
Progress Party (Fremskrittspartiet)	9
Conservative Party (Høyre)	16
Christian Democratic Party (Kristelig Folkeparti)	5
Centre Party (Senterpartiet)	2
Socialist Left Party (Sosialistisk Venstreparti)	2
Liberal Party (Venstre)	1
Total number of members:	49

Tønsberg kommunestyre 1991–1995
Party name (in Norwegian)	Number of representatives
Labour Party (Arbeiderpartiet)	13
Progress Party (Fremskrittspartiet)	5
Conservative Party (Høyre)	17
Christian Democratic Party (Kristelig Folkeparti)	4
Centre Party (Senterpartiet)	3
Socialist Left Party (Sosialistisk Venstreparti)	6
Liberal Party (Venstre)	1
Total number of members:	49

Tønsberg kommunestyre 1987–1991
Party name (in Norwegian)	Number of representatives
Labour Party (Arbeiderpartiet)	18
Progress Party (Fremskrittspartiet)	10
Conservative Party (Høyre)	21
Christian Democratic Party (Kristelig Folkeparti)	4
Centre Party (Senterpartiet)	1
Socialist Left Party (Sosialistisk Venstreparti)	2
Liberal Party (Venstre)	1
Total number of members:	57

Tønsberg bystyre 1983–1987
Party name (in Norwegian)	Number of representatives
Labour Party (Arbeiderpartiet)	16
Progress Party (Fremskrittspartiet)	4
Conservative Party (Høyre)	19
Christian Democratic Party (Kristelig Folkeparti)	3
Socialist Left Party (Sosialistisk Venstreparti)	2
Liberal Party (Venstre)	1
Total number of members:	45

Tønsberg bystyre 1979–1983
Party name (in Norwegian)	Number of representatives
Labour Party (Arbeiderpartiet)	17
Progress Party (Fremskrittspartiet)	1
Conservative Party (Høyre)	20
Christian Democratic Party (Kristelig Folkeparti)	4
Socialist Left Party (Sosialistisk Venstreparti)	2
Liberal Party (Venstre)	1
Total number of members:	45

Tønsberg bystyre 1975–1979
Party name (in Norwegian)	Number of representatives
Labour Party (Arbeiderpartiet)	21
Anders Lange's Party (Anders Langes parti)	1
Conservative Party (Høyre)	21
Christian Democratic Party (Kristelig Folkeparti)	6
Socialist Left Party (Sosialistisk Venstreparti)	3
Liberal Party (Venstre)	1
Total number of members:	53

Tønsberg bystyre 1971–1975
Party name (in Norwegian)	Number of representatives
Labour Party (Arbeiderpartiet)	25
Conservative Party (Høyre)	19
Christian Democratic Party (Kristelig Folkeparti)	4
Socialist People's Party (Sosialistisk Folkeparti)	3
Liberal Party (Venstre)	2
Total number of members:	53

Tønsberg bystyre 1967–1971
Party name (in Norwegian)	Number of representatives
Labour Party (Arbeiderpartiet)	26
Conservative Party (Høyre)	20
Christian Democratic Party (Kristelig Folkeparti)	3
Socialist People's Party (Sosialistisk Folkeparti)	2
Liberal Party (Venstre)	2
Total number of members:	53

Tønsberg bystyre 1963–1967
Party name (in Norwegian)	Number of representatives
Labour Party (Arbeiderpartiet)	26
Conservative Party (Høyre)	21
Christian Democratic Party (Kristelig Folkeparti)	3
Socialist People's Party (Sosialistisk Folkeparti)	1
Liberal Party (Venstre)	2
Total number of members:	53

Tønsberg bystyre 1959–1963
Party name (in Norwegian)	Number of representatives
Labour Party (Arbeiderpartiet)	27
Conservative Party (Høyre)	19
Communist Party (Kommunistiske Parti)	1
Christian Democratic Party (Kristelig Folkeparti)	4
Liberal Party (Venstre)	2
Total number of members:	53

Tønsberg bystyre 1955–1959
Party name (in Norwegian)	Number of representatives
Labour Party (Arbeiderpartiet)	26
Conservative Party (Høyre)	19
Communist Party (Kommunistiske Parti)	2
Christian Democratic Party (Kristelig Folkeparti)	4
Liberal Party (Venstre)	2
Total number of members:	53

Tønsberg bystyre 1951–1955
Party name (in Norwegian)	Number of representatives
Labour Party (Arbeiderpartiet)	23
Conservative Party (Høyre)	19
Communist Party (Kommunistiske Parti)	3
Christian Democratic Party (Kristelig Folkeparti)	5
Liberal Party (Venstre)	2
Total number of members:	52

Tønsberg bystyre 1947–1951
Party name (in Norwegian)	Number of representatives
Labour Party (Arbeiderpartiet)	21
Conservative Party (Høyre)	19
Communist Party (Kommunistiske Parti)	5
Christian Democratic Party (Kristelig Folkeparti)	5
Liberal Party (Venstre)	2
Total number of members:	52

Tønsberg bystyre 1945–1947
Party name (in Norwegian)	Number of representatives
Labour Party (Arbeiderpartiet)	19
Conservative Party (Høyre)	16
Communist Party (Kommunistiske Parti)	7
Christian Democratic Party (Kristelig Folkeparti)	7
Liberal Party (Venstre)	1
Local List(s) (Lokale lister)	2
Total number of members:	52

Tønsberg bystyre 1937–1940*
Party name (in Norwegian)	Number of representatives
Labour Party (Arbeiderpartiet)	22
Temperance Party (Avholdspartiet)	3
Conservative Party (Høyre)	25
Liberal Party (Venstre)	2
Total number of members:	52
Note: Due to the German occupation of Norway during World War II, no elections were held for new municipal councils until after the war ended in 1945.

Tønsberg bystyre 1934–1937
Party name (in Norwegian)	Number of representatives
Labour Party (Arbeiderpartiet)	20
Temperance Party (Avholdspartiet)	4
Conservative Party (Høyre)	24
Communist Party (Kommunistiske Parti)	1
Liberal Party (Venstre)	3
Total number of members:	52

Tønsberg bystyre 1931–1934
Party name (in Norwegian)	Number of representatives
Labour Party (Arbeiderpartiet)	17
Temperance Party (Avholdspartiet)	5
Conservative Party (Høyre)	27
Liberal Party (Venstre)	3
Total number of members:	52

Tønsberg bystyre 1928–1931
Party name (in Norwegian)	Number of representatives
Labour Party (Arbeiderpartiet)	17
Temperance Party (Avholdspartiet)	6
Conservative Party (Høyre)	27
Communist Party (Kommunistiske Parti)	1
Liberal Party (Venstre)	1
Total number of members:	52

Tønsberg bystyre 1925–1928
Party name (in Norwegian)	Number of representatives
Labour Party (Arbeiderpartiet)	3
Temperance Party (Avholdspartiet)	7
Conservative Party (Høyre)	28
Communist Party (Kommunistiske Parti)	2
Social Democratic Labour Party (Socialdemokratiske Arbeiderparti)	11
Liberal Party (Venstre)	1
Total number of members:	52

Tønsberg bystyre 1922–1925
Party name (in Norwegian)	Number of representatives
Labour Party (Arbeiderpartiet)	11
Temperance Party (Avholdspartiet)	4
Conservative Party (Høyre)	28
Social Democratic Labour Party (Socialdemokratiske Arbeiderparti)	7
Liberal Party (Venstre)	2
Total number of members:	52

Tønsberg bystyre 1920–1922
Party name (in Norwegian)	Number of representatives
Labour Party (Arbeiderpartiet)	16
Temperance Party (Avholdspartiet)	5
Liberal Party (Venstre)	2
Joint list of the Conservative Party (Høyre) and the Free-minded Liberal Party (Frisinnede Venstre)	21
Total number of members:	44

=== Mayors ===
The mayor (Norwegian: ordfører) of Tønsberg Municipality is the political leader of the municipality and the chairperson of the municipal council. The following people have held this position:

- 1838–1839: Jacob Jacobsen
- 1840–1840: Peter Ambrosius Bruun
- 1841–1841: Jacob Jacobsen
- 1842–1842: Thomas Hvistendahl
- 1843–1843: Nicolai Bruun
- 1844–1844: Hans Falkenberg Hovbrender
- 1845–1845: Georg Daniel Barth Abel
- 1846–1846: Fredrik Severin Lorentzen
- 1847–1847: Samuel Foyn
- 1848–1848: Hans Hansen
- 1849–1849: Wilhelm Christian Lied
- 1850–1850: Henrich Holst
- 1851–1851: Johan Henrik Dietrichs
- 1852–1852: Brede Thurmann
- 1853–1853: Lauritz Bodin
- 1854–1854: Ole Christophersen Berrum
- 1855–1855: Christian Fredrik Røsch
- 1856–1866: Nils Magnus Bugge
- 1867–1877: Riulf Erlandsen
- 1878–1878: Jens Bernhard Rode
- 1879–1883: Johannes Winding Harbitz (H)
- 1884–1884: Georg Johan Knap (H)
- 1885–1887: Johannes Winding Harbitz (H)
- 1888–1888: Georg Johan Knap (H)
- 1889–1893: Johannes Winding Harbitz (H)
- 1894–1894: Wilhelm Wilhelmsen (H)
- 1895–1904: Anders Larsen (H)
- 1905–1905: Christopher Knudsen (H)
- 1905–1907: Peder Thoresen (H)
- 1908–1910: Anders Larsen (H)
- 1911–1913: John Søyland (H)
- 1914–1916: Peder Thoresen (H)
- 1917–1919: Anders Rørholt
- 1920–1922: Johan Henrik Christiansen (H)
- 1923–1928: Odd Nerdrum
- 1929–1933: Haagen Cappelen (H)
- 1933–1934: Sylfest Muldal
- 1935–1936: Arne Aas (H)
- 1936–1937: Trygve Sverdrup (H)
- 1937v1937: Gunnar Eliassen (H)
- 1938–1940: Leif Helberg (H)
- 1941–1942: Eivind Bjerk (NS)
- 1945–1945: Knut D. Christiansen
- 1945–1945: Leif Helberg (H)
- 1946–1952: Georg Martinsen (Ap)
- 1953–1953: Emil Stang Lund (H)
- 1954–1955: Georg Martinsen (Ap)
- 1956–1963: Thorvald B. Olsen (Ap)
- 1963–1975: Kolbjørn Hogsnes (Ap)
- 1976–1993: Erik Carlsen (H)
- 1993–1995: Jørn Olav Hagen (KrF)
- 1995–2001: Hans Kristian Hogsnes (H)
- 2001–2003: Harald Haug Andersen (Ap)
- 2003–2009: Per Arne Olsen (FrP)
- 2009–2019: Petter Berg (H)
- 2019–2023: Anne Rygh Pedersen (Ap)
- 2023–present: Frank Pedersen (H)

== Geography ==
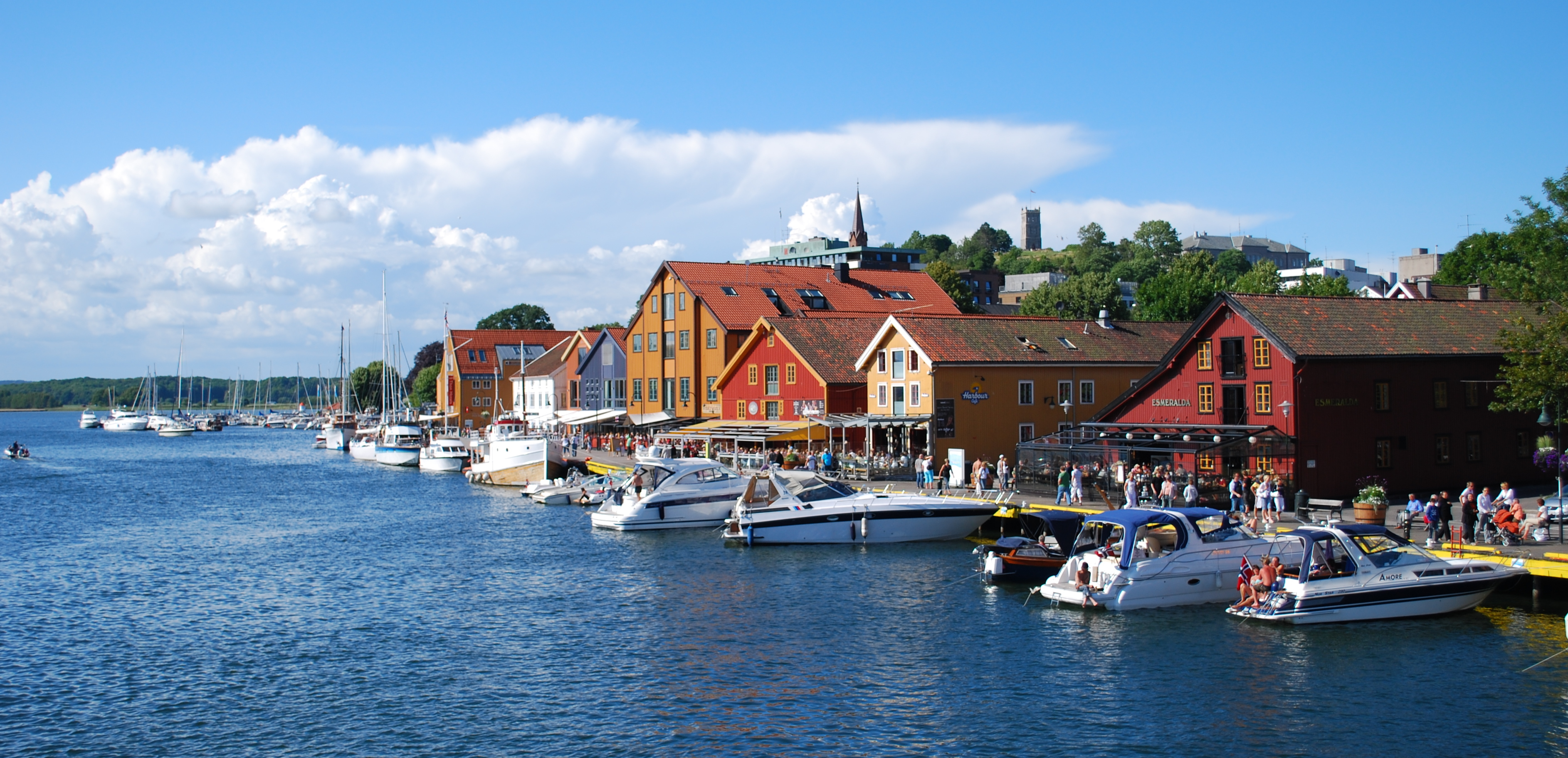
Tønsberg Wharf in city centre

Tønsberg is a municipality in Vestfold County, on the western shore of the Oslofjord. Tønsberg lies north of Færder Municipality, west and south of Horten Municipality, and east of Sandefjord Municipality. Most of the municipality lies on the mainland plus a small area on the north end of the island of Nøtterøy. Just south of Tønsberg are the islands of Nøtterøy and Tjøme (both in Færder Municipality), which are tourist destinations. The highest point in the municipality is the 399.97-metre (1,312.2 ft) tall mountain Snippane, located just east of the border with Larvik Municipality.

The bedrock in the municipality consists entirely of igneous rocks. The landscape is characterized by slightly hilly, elongated and wooded hills with crevasse valleys running north–south and with heights in the western part of the municipality reaching as high as the 400-metre (1,300 ft) tall Snippane, just west of Vivestad. Streams and rivers follow the north–south running valleys. The Storelva river, which flows centrally through the municipality from north to south, and the Merkedamselva river in the west unite and become the river Aulielva which then flows into the Tønsbergfjorden.

=== Climate ===
Climate data for Tønsberg – Kilen 1999–2020 (3 m)
Month	Jan	Feb	Mar	Apr	May	Jun	Jul	Aug	Sep	Oct	Nov	Dec	Year
Daily mean °C (°F)	−1.4 (29.5)	−1.2 (29.8)	1.7 (35.1)	6.2 (43.2)	11.1 (52.0)	15.0 (59.0)	17.2 (63.0)	16.8 (62.2)	12.6 (54.7)	7.3 (45.1)	3.1 (37.6)	−0.7 (30.7)	7.3 (45.2)
Average precipitation mm (inches)	73 (2.9)	54 (2.1)	48 (1.9)	51 (2.0)	71 (2.8)	71 (2.8)	72 (2.8)	93 (3.7)	86 (3.4)	106 (4.2)	95 (3.7)	86 (3.4)	906 (35.7)
Source: yr.no (mean, precipitation)

== Twin towns – sister cities ==
Tønsberg has sister city agreements with the following places:

- Covarrubias, Spain
- Évora, Portugal
- Ísafjörður, Iceland
- Joensuu, Finland
- Lamia, Greece
- Linköping, Sweden
- Ravenna, Italy
- (Republic of Ireland) Waterford, Ireland
