= Solvang Church (Vestfold) =

Church in Vestfold, Norway

- Solvang kirke
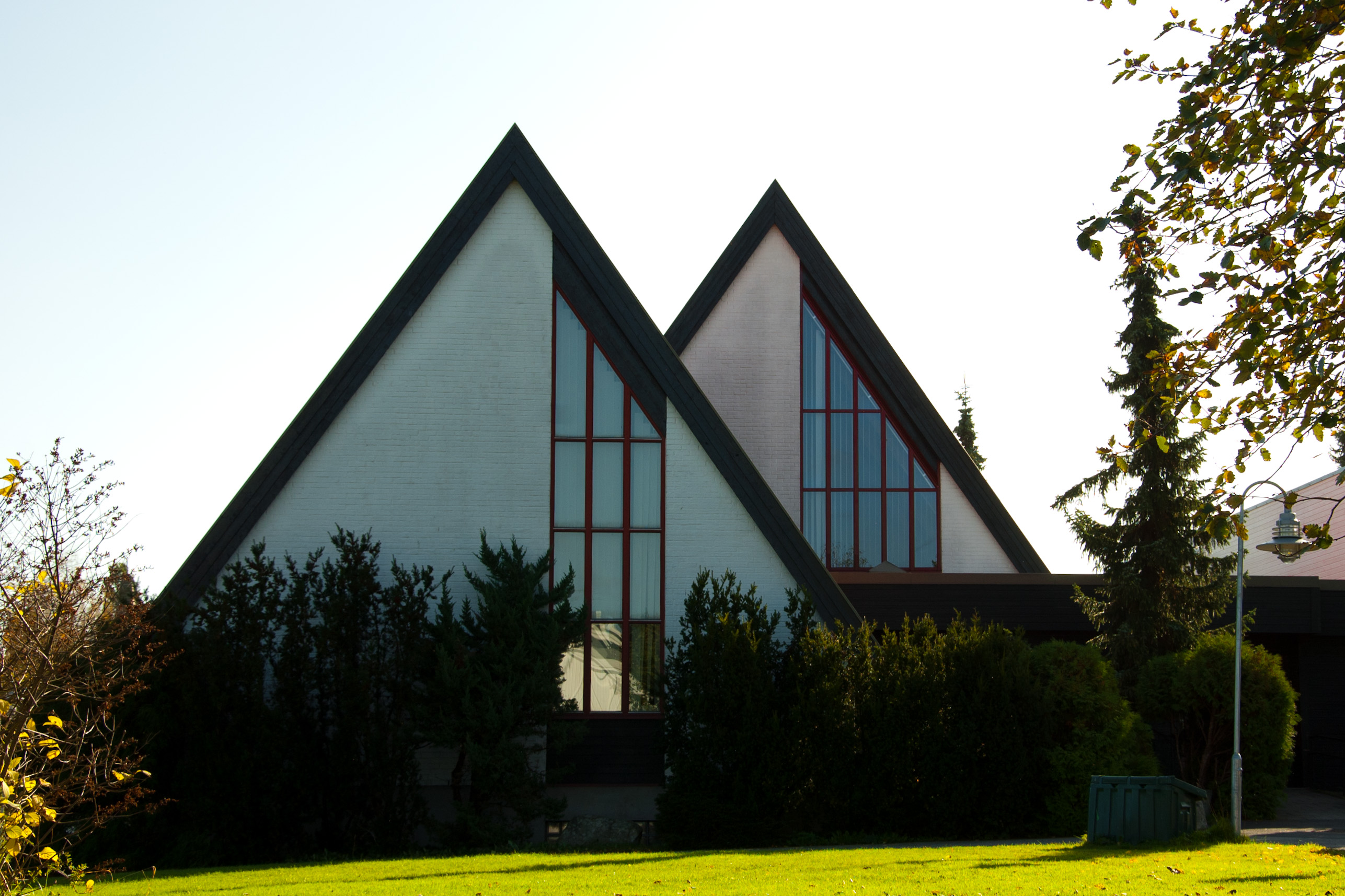
- View of the church
- Solvang Church
- 59°16′31″N 10°25′09″E
- Location: Tønsberg Municipality, Vestfold
- Country: Norway
- Denomination: Church of Norway
- Churchmanship: Evangelical Lutheran

History
- Status: Parish church
- Founded: 1969
- Consecrated: 9 March 1969

Architecture
- Functional status: Active
- Architect: Elisabet Fidjestøl
- Architectural type: Long church
- Completed: 1969 (57 years ago)

Specifications
- Capacity: 300
- Materials: Brick

Administration
- Diocese: Tunsberg
- Deanery: Tønsberg domprosti
- Parish: Tønsberg domkirke
- Norwegian Cultural Heritage Site
- Type: Church
- Status: Not protected
- ID: 85524

Solvang Church (Norwegian: Solvang kirke) is a parish church of the Church of Norway in Tønsberg Municipality in Vestfold county, Norway. It is located in the city of Tønsberg. It is one of the churches for the "Tønsberg domkirke" parish which is part of the Tønsberg domprosti (deanery) in the Diocese of Tunsberg. The white, brick church was built in a long church design in 1969 using plans drawn up by the architect Elisabet Fidjestøl. The church seats about 300 people.

== History ==
During the late 1950s, residents of Tønsberg started asking for another church in the growing city. In 1955, the local provost advocated for the construction of a modern church and the local bishop did the same in 1959. In 1961, the architect Elisabet Fidjestøl was hired to design the new church. The process took a few years. The site selection was changed along the way, and the draft was reworked. Construction began in the autumn of 1967 and the new church was consecrated on 9 March 1969. In 1988, an addition of a new congregational hall was built next the main building. In 2004, the nave was refurbished.

== See also ==
- List of churches in Tunsberg
