= Husøy Church (Tønsberg) =

Church in Vestfold, Norway

- Husøy kirke
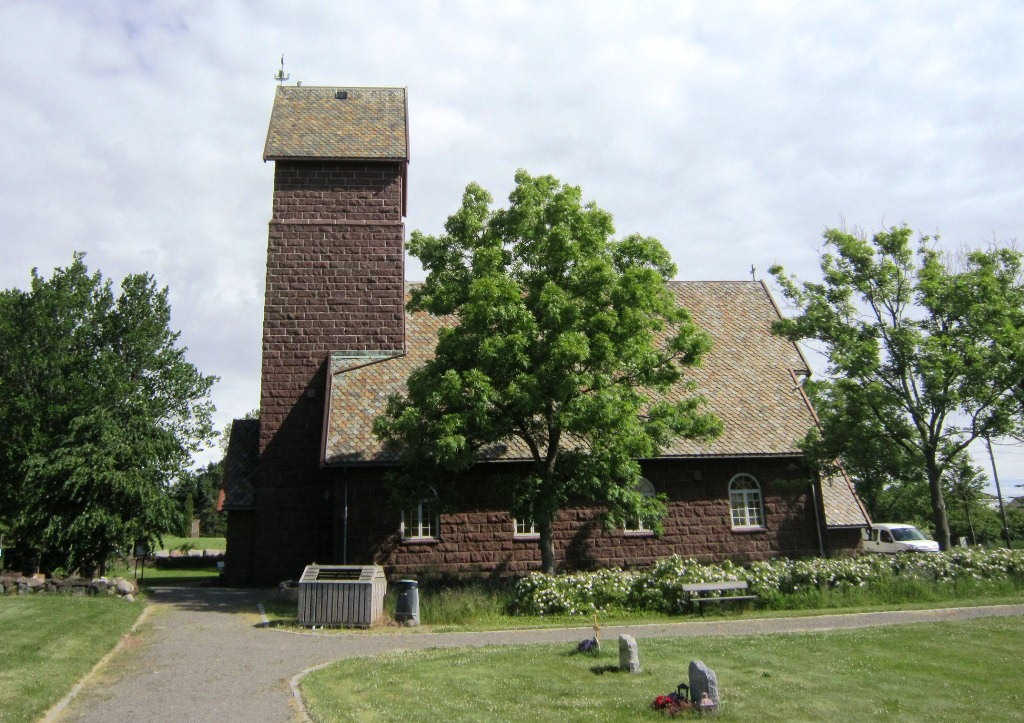
- View of the church
- Husøy Church
- 59°14′13″N 10°27′49″E
- Location: Tønsberg Municipality, Vestfold
- Country: Norway
- Denomination: Church of Norway
- Churchmanship: Evangelical Lutheran

History
- Former name: Husøy kapell
- Status: Parish church
- Founded: 1933
- Consecrated: 8 Sept 1933

Architecture
- Functional status: Active
- Architect: Eirik Eikrann
- Architectural type: Long church
- Completed: 1933 (93 years ago)

Specifications
- Capacity: 183
- Materials: Stone

Administration
- Diocese: Tunsberg
- Deanery: Tønsberg domprosti
- Parish: Søndre Slagen
- Norwegian Cultural Heritage Site
- Type: Church
- Status: Listed
- ID: 84675

Husøy Church (Norwegian: Husøy kirke) is a parish church of the Church of Norway in Tønsberg Municipality in Vestfold county, Norway. It is located in the village of Husøy. It is one of the churches for the Søndre Slagen parish which is part of the Tønsberg domprosti (deanery) in the Diocese of Tunsberg. The reddish-brown, stone church was built in a long church design in 1933 using plans drawn up by the architect Eirik Eikrann. The church seats about 183 people.

== History ==
Historically, the island had belonged to other parishes, but by the 20th century, the island residents wanted their own church. In 1925, a cemetery on Husøy was consecrated. Soon after, work began towards getting a chapel built. In 1932–1933, a chapel was built at the cemetery and it was consecrated on 8 September 1933. It was originally known as Husøy Chapel (in the 21st century, the name was changed to Husøy Church). The building was designed by Eirik Eikrann. The building material is a local syenite which has a rough, brick-like look. There is a steep gable roof on both the nave/choir and bell tower. The choir is flanked by vestries that fill up to the same width as the nave and have exit doors in the east. The proportions are such that the building seems quite wide in relation to its length, and the roof is quite dominant. The church is inspired by the county's medieval churches, but also has features of classicism and functionalism. The windows and doors are all arched.

== See also ==
- List of churches in Tunsberg
