= Eik, Vestfold =

Village in Tønsberg Municipality, Norway

Eik
- Village
- Interactive map of Eik
- Coordinates: 59.29402°N 10.42032°E
- Country: Norway
- Region: Eastern Norway
- County: Vestfold
- Municipality: Tønsberg Municipality
- Elevation: 52 m (171 ft)
- Time zone: UTC+01:00 (CET)
  - Summer (DST): UTC+02:00 (CEST)
- Post Code: 3122 Tønsberg

Eik is a village/neighborhood in Tønsberg Municipality in Vestfold county, Norway. The village is located at the northern edge of the city of Tønsberg. The village area lies about 3 kilometres (1.9 mi) to the southeast of the village of Barkåker. The Slagen Church lies on the northeastern edge of Eik.

The village is the home of the football club Eik-Tønsberg.
