= Slagen Church =

Church in Vestfold, Norway

- Slagen kirke
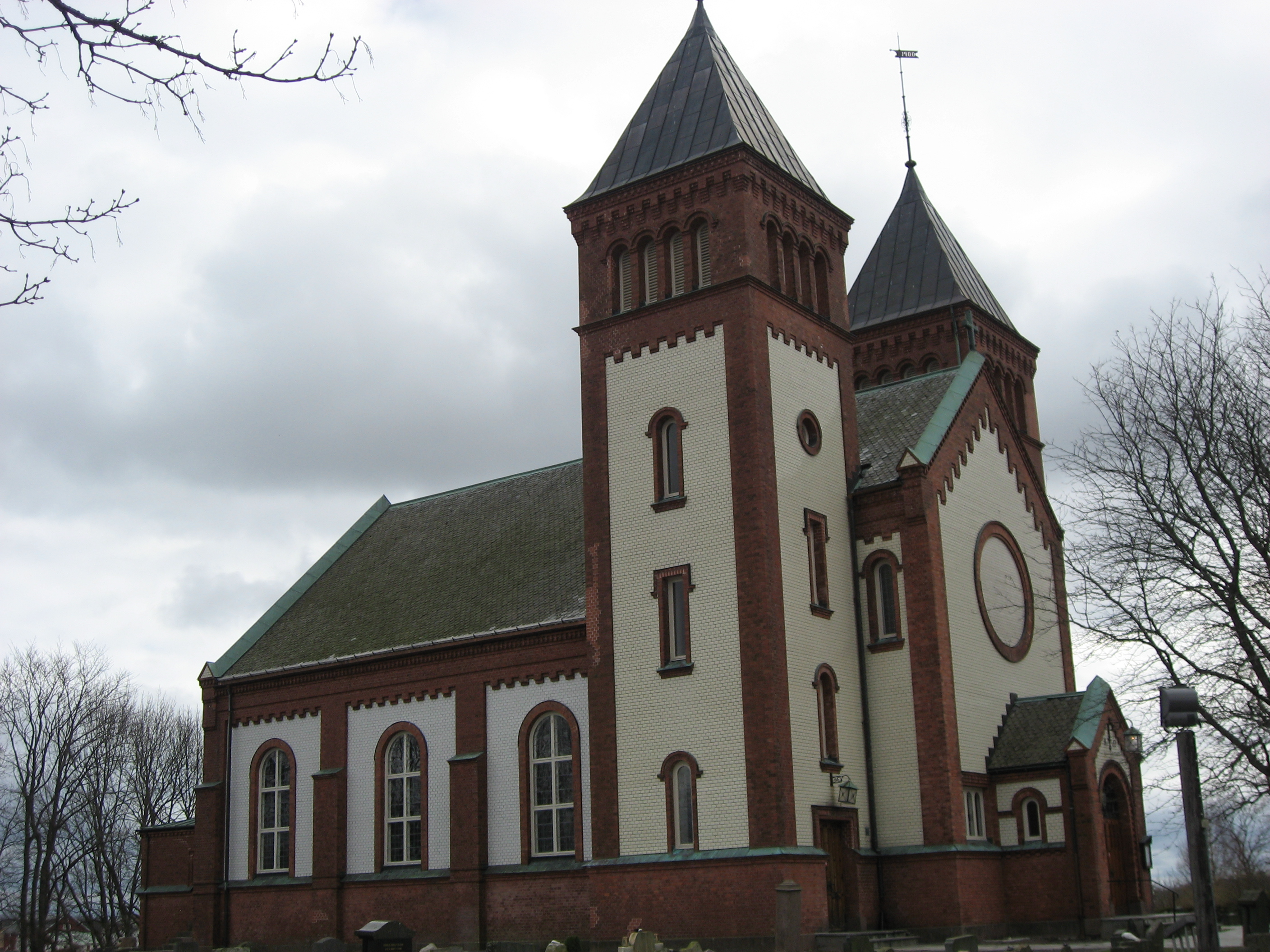
- View of the church
- Slagen Church
- 59°18′11″N 10°26′32″E
- Location: Tønsberg Municipality, Vestfold
- Country: Norway
- Denomination: Church of Norway
- Previous denomination: Catholic Church
- Churchmanship: Evangelical Lutheran

History
- Status: Parish church
- Founded: 12th century
- Consecrated: 29 March 1901

Architecture
- Functional status: Active
- Architect: Halfdan Berle
- Architectural type: Long church
- Completed: 1901 (125 years ago)

Specifications
- Capacity: 332
- Materials: Brick

Administration
- Diocese: Tunsberg
- Deanery: Tønsberg domprosti
- Parish: Slagen
- Norwegian Cultural Heritage Site
- Type: Church
- Status: Listed
- ID: 85495

Slagen Church (Norwegian: Slagen kirke) is a parish church of the Church of Norway in Tønsberg Municipality in Vestfold county, Norway. It is located in the village of Slagen which is just east of the village of Eik. It is the church for the Slagen parish which is part of the Tønsberg domprosti (deanery) in the Diocese of Tunsberg. The white, stone church was built in a long church design in 1901 using plans drawn up by the architect Halfdan Berle. The church seats about 332 people.

== History ==
The earliest existing historical records of the church date back to the year 1315, but the church was not built that year. The first church in Slagen was a Romanesque stone church that was likely built around the year 1150, although it probably took many years to complete. The nave was built first and the chancel and western bell-tower were added later. The County of Jarlsberg took ownership of the church during the 1700s, and by 1823, the building was said to be in very poor condition. In 1830, the Count had the western tower replaced with a new tower. By 1847, the church was still in need of lots of repairs. In 1857, there was a major renovation of the building. New windows were installed, the chancel was enlarged and many of the interior furnishings were changed out. On Sunday, 11 September 1898, a fire started on the neighboring property and it spread to the church. The altarpiece, baptismal font, silver furnishings on the altar, and some other furnishings were rescued, but the church building were significantly damaged in the fire.

After the fire, there was some discussion about whether the church should be rebuilt in the same place or in another, more central place in the municipality. At first it seemed that the latter would happen, but it ended up being rebuilt on the same plot. Land and remains of the church were also transferred from the county to the parish after the fire. The new church was designed by Halfdan Berle and after it was completed, it was consecrated on 29 March 1901. The new church is a brick long church (with some whitewashed surfaces). The church has twin towers on either side of the entrance in the west, and the chancel in the east is surrounded by two small vestries. The style is obviously medieval-inspired with round-arched door and window openings. The church was extensively restored in 1955–1956 according to plans by the architect Arnstein Arneberg and with Henrik Sørensen as artistic consultant.

== Media gallery ==
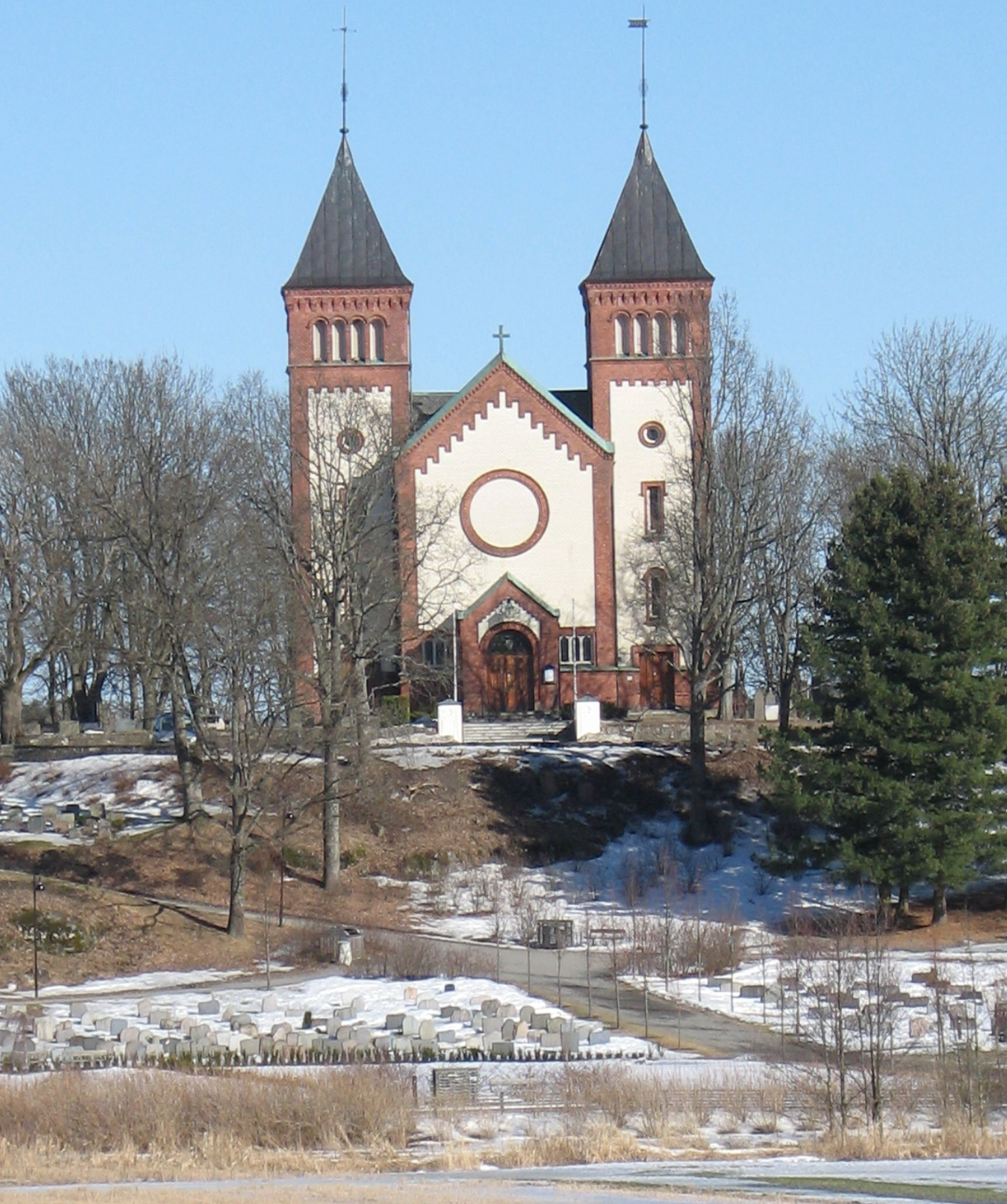

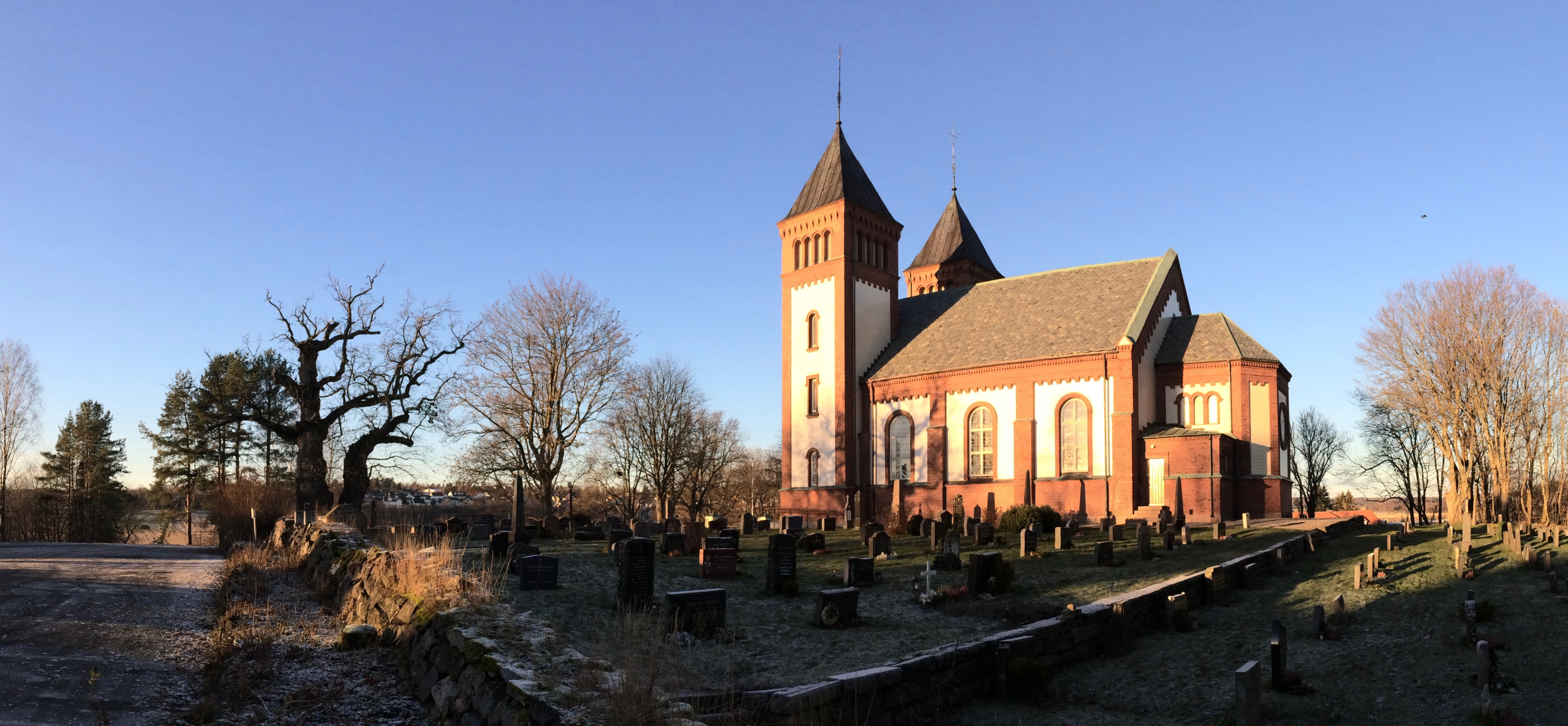

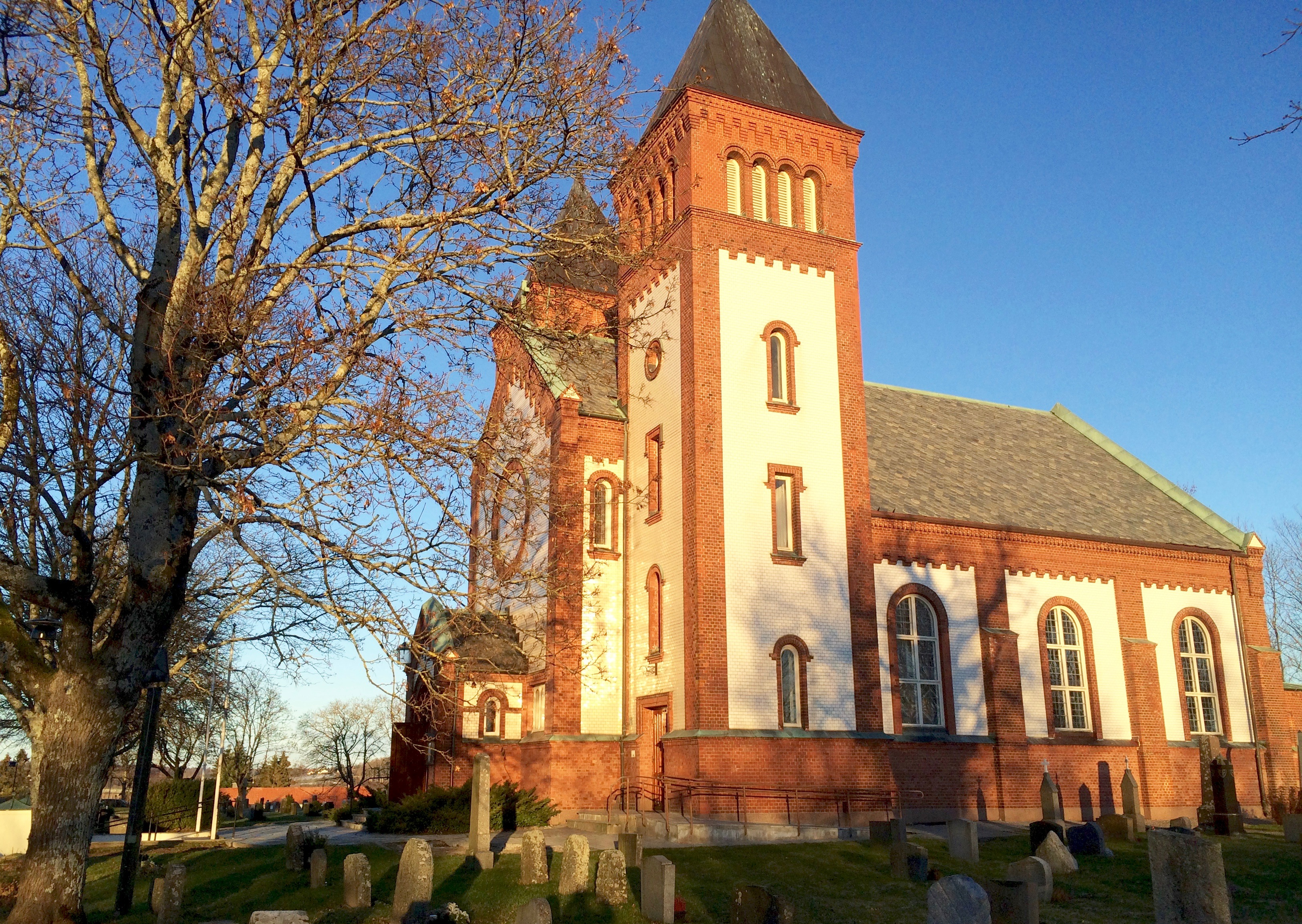

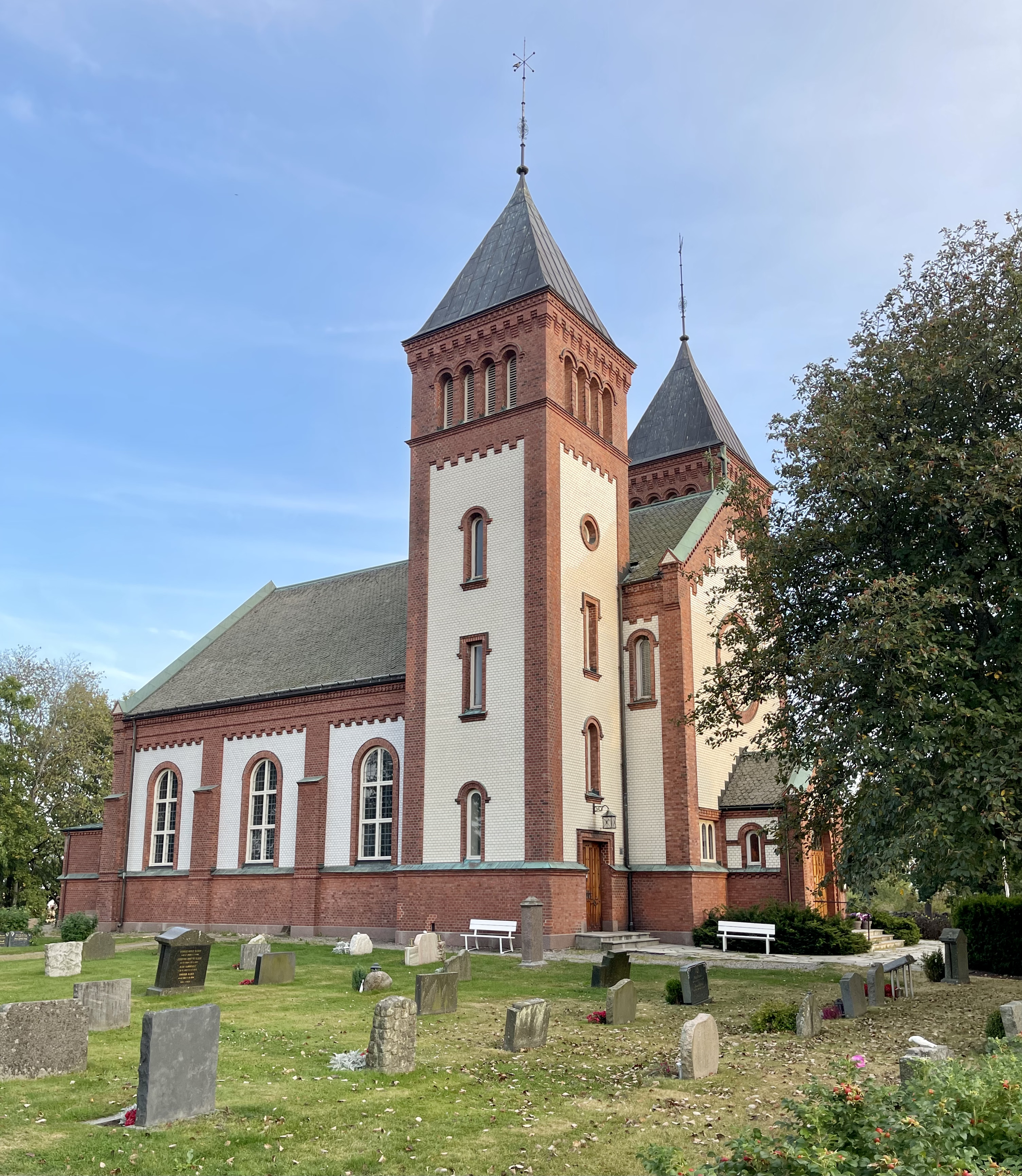

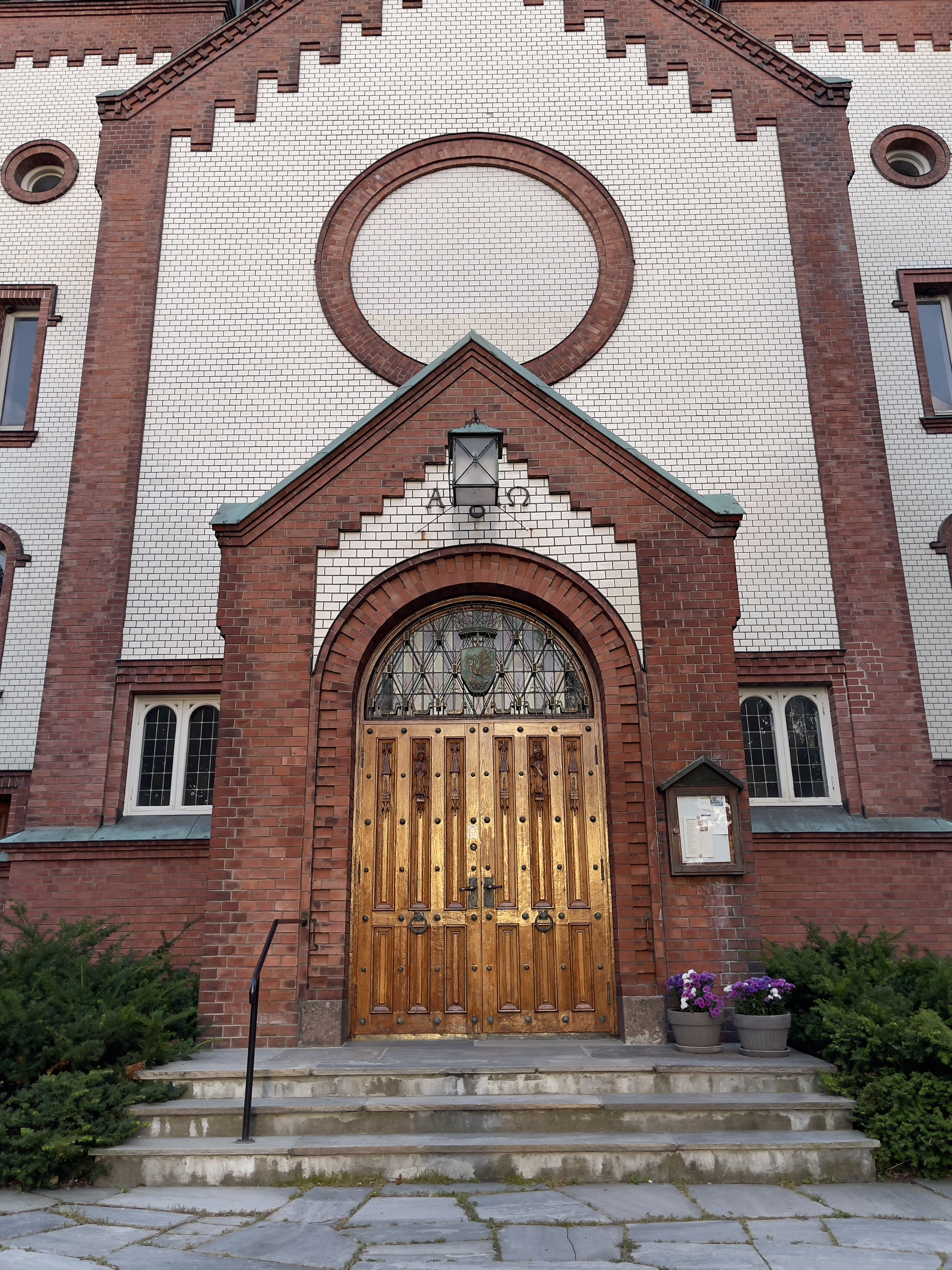

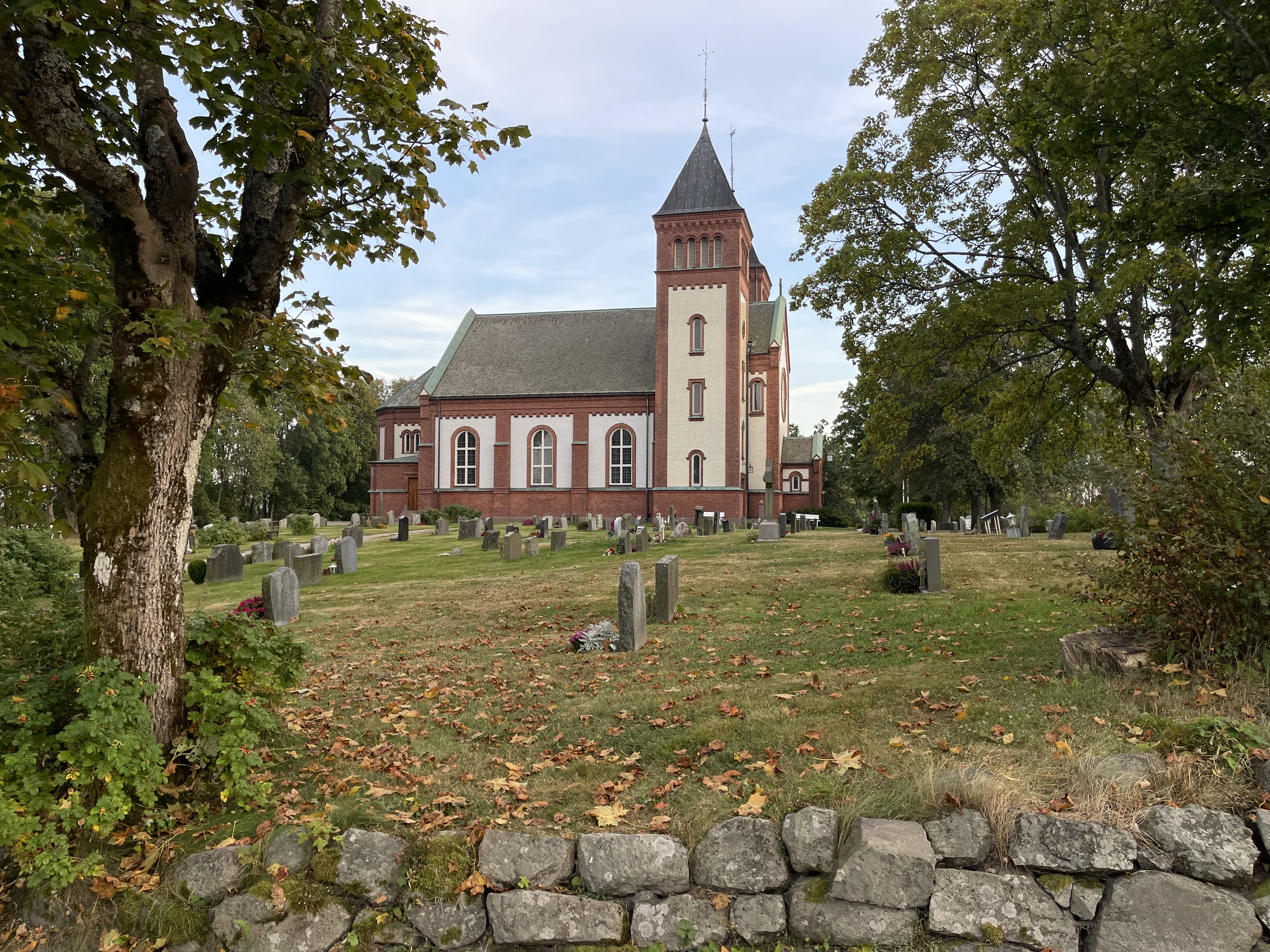

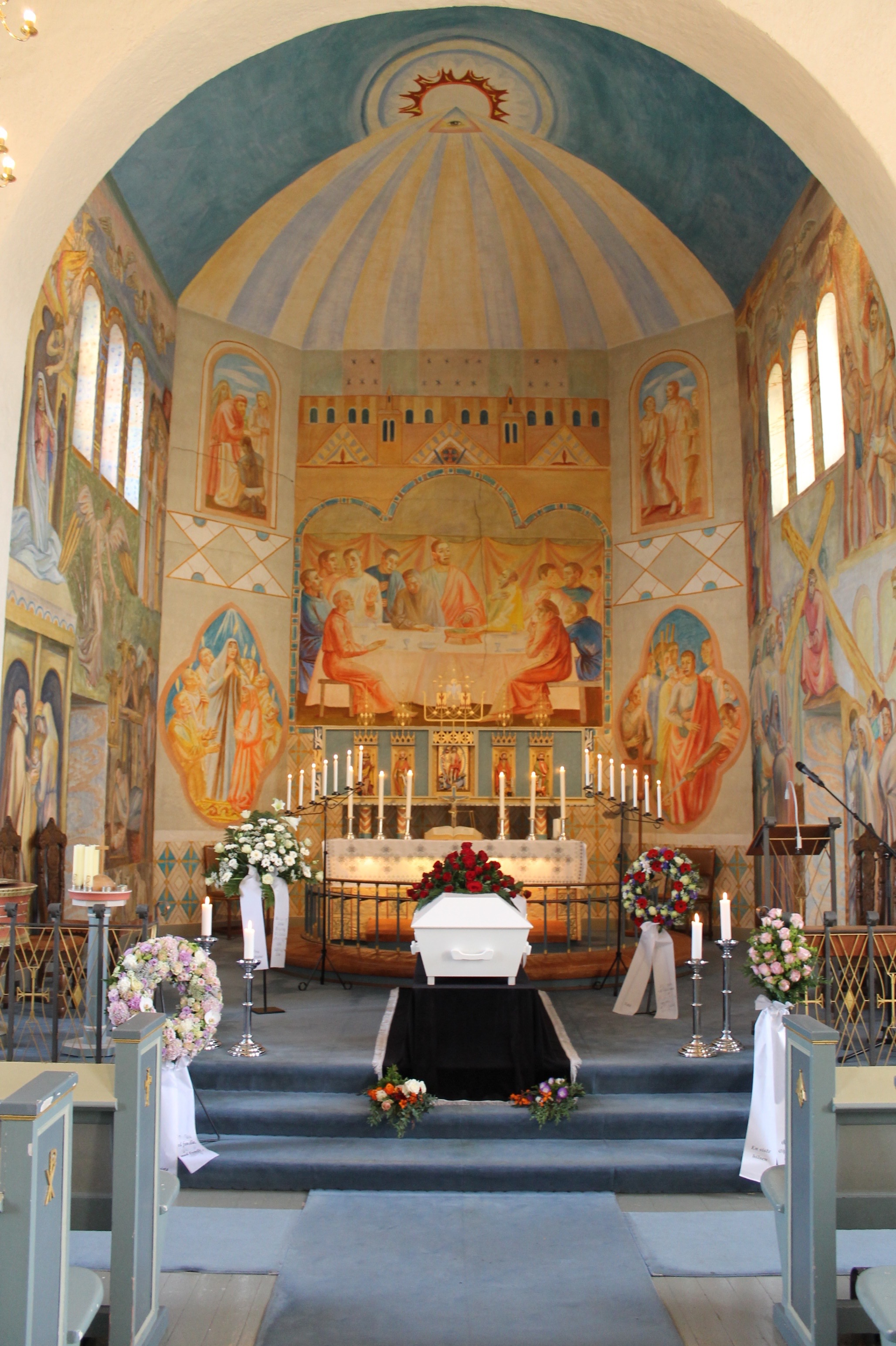

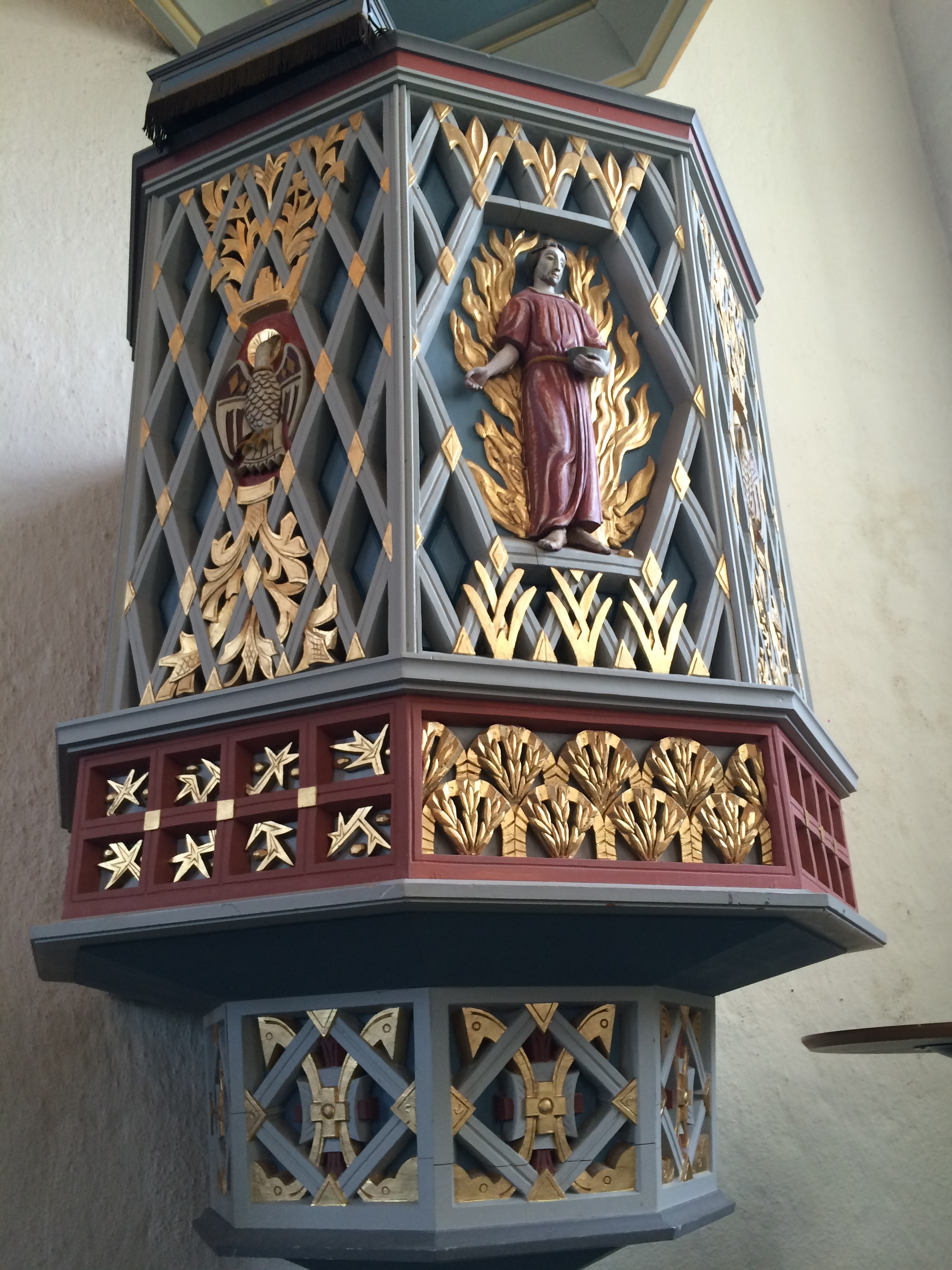

== See also ==
- List of churches in Tunsberg
