= Husøy, Tønsberg =

Island in Vestfold, Norway

Husøy
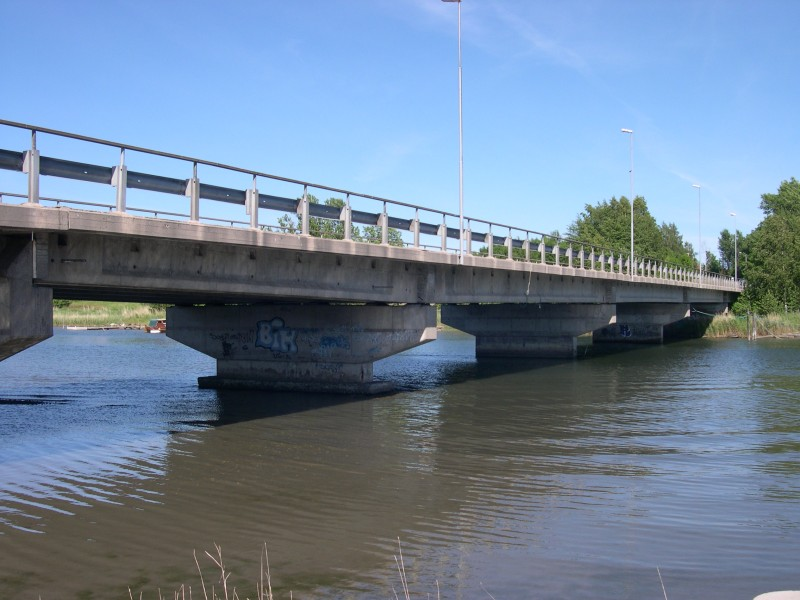
- The Føynland bridge, connecting Føynland to Nøtterøy.
- Interactive map of the island

Geography
- Location: Vestfold, Norway
- Coordinates: 59.23849°N 10.46079°E
- Area: 0.9 km^{2} (0.35 sq mi)
- Length: 1.5 km (0.93 mi)
- Width: 0.7 km (0.43 mi)

Administration
- Norway
- County: Vestfold
- Municipality: Tønsberg Municipality

Husøy is a populated island in Tønsberg Municipality in Vestfold county, Norway. The 0.9-square-kilometre (220-acre) island is part of the city of Tønsberg, located just off-shore, but it is not connected to Tønsberg by road. The island is a densely populated residential neighborhood that is also known as Husøy.

The only bridge connection is to the village of Føynland in neighboring Færder Municipality. In the summer, there is a ferry connection from Husøy to Tønsberg.

== See also ==
- List of islands of Norway
