= Sørkedalen Church =

- Sørkedalen kirke
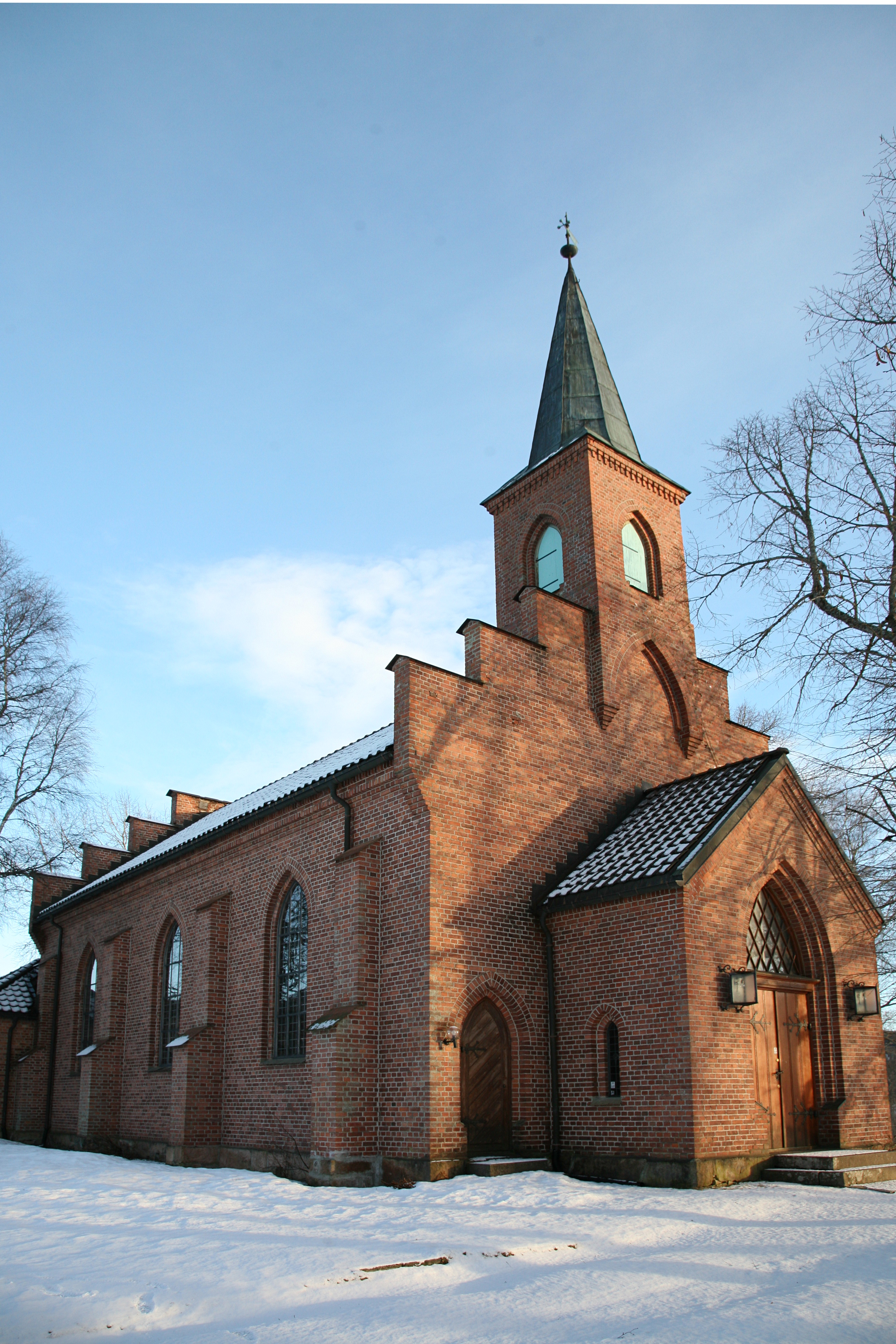
- Sørkedalen Church
- 60°0′56″N 10°36′59″E
- Location: Sørkedalen; Oslo,
- Country: Norway
- Denomination: Church of Norway
- Churchmanship: Evangelical Lutheran
- Website: kirken.no/sorkedalen

History
- Status: Parish church
- Consecrated: 1865

Architecture
- Functional status: Active
- Architect(s): Christian Heinrich Grosch, Georg Greve
- Architectural type: Neo Gothic

Specifications
- Capacity: 250
- Materials: Brick

Administration
- Diocese: Diocese of Oslo
- Deanery: Vestre Aker
- Parish: Røa og Sørkedalen

Sørkedalen Church is a church in Sørkedalen in Oslo, Norway. The edifice is made of brick and has 250 seats. The church is in the Gothic Revival style. Adjacent to the church is a cemetery. Christian Heinrich Grosch had been tasked to prepare plans and drawings for the church and it was consecrated on September 15, 1865 by Bishop Jens Lauritz Arup. The surrounding cemetery was also consecrated at the same time.

In 1865 the church had two church bells, an organ and a simple wooden cross at the altar.

In the 1930s the interior was changed after plans by architect Georg Greve. Today's altarpiece, made of wood is created by Dagfin Werenskiold and is a replica of the altarpiece of his in Hornindal Church. The stained glass windows in the church are created by Bernhard Greve.

The former organ was replaced in 1976 by a 15 voices pipe organ from Ott Organ Factory in Göttingen.

Sørkedalen church is listed by the Norwegian Directorate for Cultural Heritage.
