= Christen Collin =

Norwegian literary historian

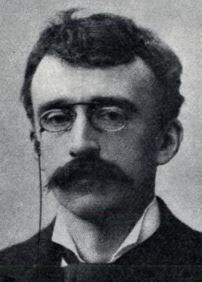
Christen Christian Collin

Christen Christian Dreyer Collin (21 November 1857 – 1 April 1926) was a Norwegian literary historian.

He was born in Trondhjem as a son of Georg Fredrik Collin (died 1867) and Marie Fredrikke Dreyer (1833–1901). When his father died at the age of ten, Christen Collin was raised by his maternal grandfather in Tromsøe. He took the cand.philol. degree at the Royal Frederick University in 1887, and studied abroad while writing for Verdens Gang before returning home and founding the periodical Nyt Tidsskrift.

He started teaching at the Royal Frederick University in 1892, and was promoted to docent in the history of European literature in 1895. He was a member of the Norwegian Academy of Science and Letters from 1897. He was a professor from 1914 to his death, and is best known for his research on English literature and Bjørnstjerne Bjørnson. He biographed the early Bjørnson in the 1907 book Bjørnstjerne Bjørnson. Hans barndom og ungdom. A collection of letter correspondence between Bjørnson and Collin was released in 1937. A William Shakespeare biography was planned but never finished, but Collin wrote articles on Shakespeare, reissued The Merchant of Venice and translated English poetry.

Collin was not uncontroversial in his time. He criticized Naturalism, especially in the 1894 book Kunsten og moralen, and received rebuttals from people like Gunnar Heiberg, Nils Kjær, Arne Garborg and Georg Brandes. He, especially in his later career, wrote several books where he diagnosed the European culture of the time with "cultural diseases" or "cultural problems". In them, he fused his cultural knowledge with sociology, natural sciences and medicine. Such books include Leo Tolstoi og nutidens kulturkrise (1910), Brorskapets religion og den nye livsvidenskap (1912), Det geniale menneske (1914), Vintersolhverv (1916), Verdenskrigen og det store tidsskifte (1917), Livskunst (1917), Den hvite mands sidste chanse (1921) and Ved en ny tids frembrud (1922). From 1918 to 1925 he edited his own periodical, Atlantis. He was branded as a socialist by some, but shunned by the socialists after supporting the existence of a military. During the First World War he strongly supported the Triple Entente.

In July 1894 he married Astrid Greve (1874–1947), a daughter of Mathias Sigwardt Greve and sister of Ulrikke Greve and Bredo Greve. He died in April 1926 in Oslo.
