= Mathias Sigwardt =

Norwegian bishop (1770–1840)

Right Reverend Mathias Sigwardt
- Bishop of Christianssand
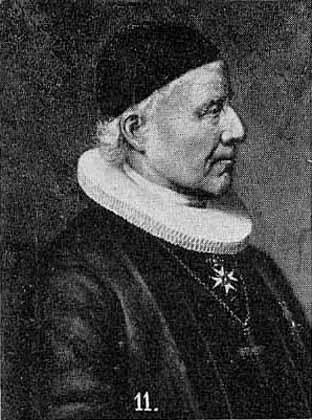
- Church: Church of Norway
- Diocese: Diocese of Christianssand
- Appointed: 1832
- In office: 1832–1840
- Predecessor: Johan Storm Munch
- Successor: Jacob von der Lippe

Personal details
- Born: 20 October 1770 Borre, Norway
- Died: 8 October 1840 (aged 69) Christianssand, Norway
- Denomination: Christian
- Parents: Søren Sigwardt and Ulrikke Leonore Weinwich
- Occupation: Priest

Mathias Sigwardt (20 October 1770–8 October 1840) was priest and Bishop of the Church of Norway.

Sigwardt was born in Borre in Vestfold county, Norway. He was the son of vicar Søren Sigwardt (1729–1792) and his first wife Ulrikke Leonore, née Weinwich. He took his primary and secondary education under the tutoring of his father until he was 18 when he went to a school in Christiania where Herman Amberg taught him. Sigwardt enrolled as a student in 1791, and graduated with the cand.theol. degree in 1795.

== Career ==
In 1796, Sigwardt became a curate in Vaale in Vestfold working under the parish priest Frants Philip Hopstock (whose daughter he married in 1798). In 1799, he became a chaplain and inspector at the teacher's seminary in Tønsberg in Vestfold county. In 1804, he moved to Christiania to become the vicar for the Christiania Hospital and the Christiania Tugthus (prison). In 1816, he became the parish priest for Tune in Østfold county. In 1820, he was promoted to be the Dean for the Diocese of Christiania. Starting in 1825 he was working for the Court of the Royal Family. In 1832, he was appointed as the Bishop of the Diocese of Christianssand. He got sick during a trip to Mandal in 1839, and he died in Christianssand on 8 October 1840.

== Personal life ==
In 1798, he married Louise Juliane Catharine Hopstock, a daughter of the priest Frants Philip Hopstock. She died in November 1815, and in 1822 Sigwardt married the widow of Nicolai Lumholtz, Karine Lumholtz. Through his daughter Ulrike Eleonore, Mathias Sigwardt was a grandfather of physician Mathias Sigwardt Greve and great-grandfather of the architect Bredo Greve and the weaver Ulrikke Greve.

Religious titles
Preceded by Johan Storm Munch	Bishop of Christianssand; 1832–1840	Succeeded by Jacob von der Lippe
