= Anita Greve =

Norwegian painter

- Born: Anita Ruth Greve; August 5, 1905; Kristiania, Norway
- Died: September 19, 1972 (aged 67)
- Parents: Bredo Greve (father); Esther Hougberg (mother)
- Relatives: Ulrikke Greve (uncle)

Anita Ruth Greve (5 August 1905 – 19 September 1972) was a Norwegian painter.

She was born in Kristiania as a daughter of Bredo Greve (1871–1931) and Finnish citizen Esther Hougberg (1878–1939). She was a niece of Ulrikke Greve.

She studied at the Norwegian National Academy of Fine Arts from 1935 to 1936 and 1938 to 1940, and her solo debut exhibition came at Kunstnerforbundet in 1946. She also took part in Høstutstillingen twenty-five times, and was represented in collective exhibitions in other Nordic countries.

During the occupation of Norway by Nazi Germany, Greve was imprisoned in Grini concentration camp from June 1942 to the war's end in May 1945.
