= Røa Church =

Coordinates: 59°56′59″N 10°38′36″E

- Røa kirke
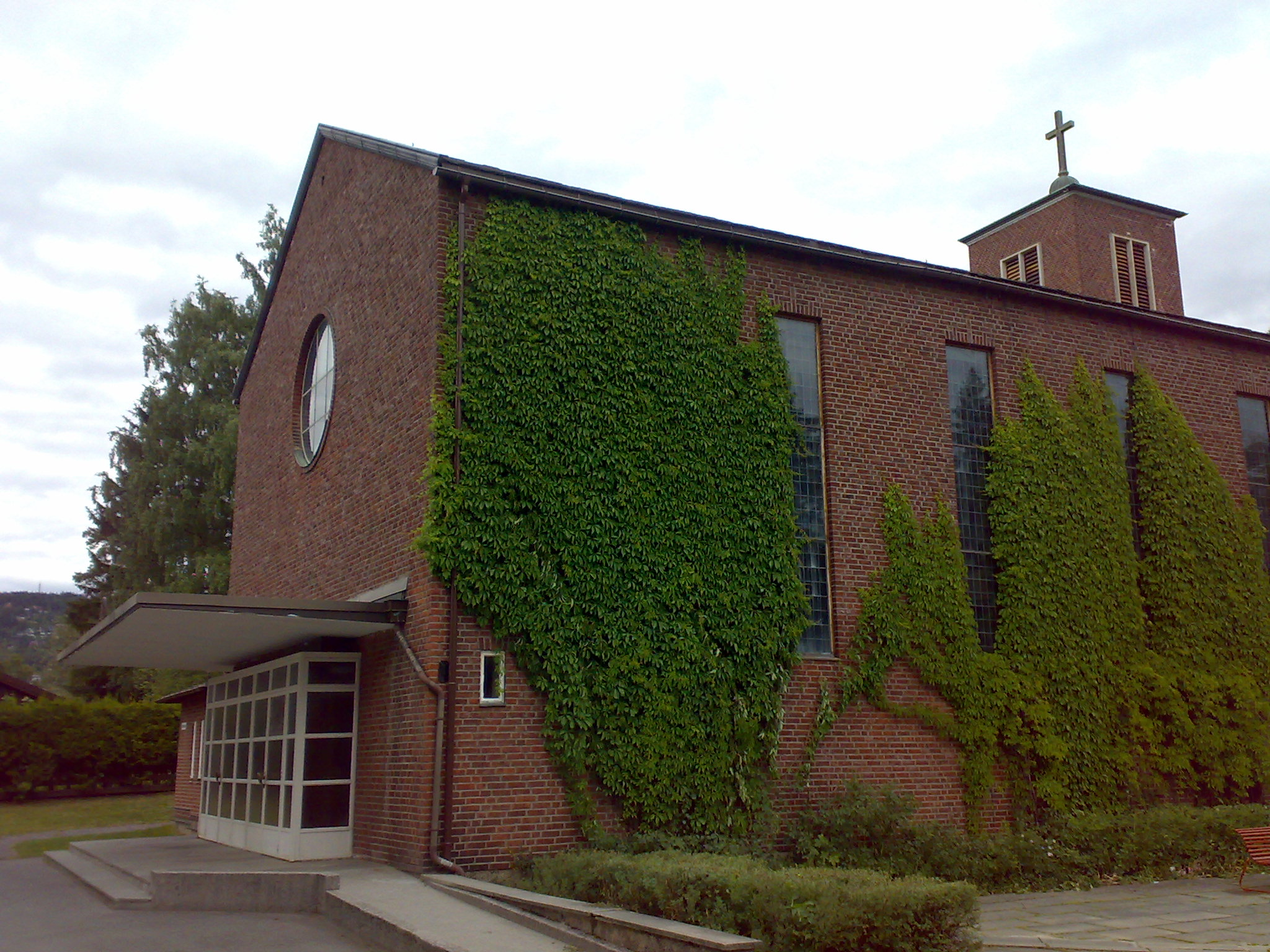

- Location in Oslo Røa Church (Norway)
- Location: Nordengveien 9, Oslo
- Country: Norway
- Denomination: Church of Norway
- Churchmanship: Evangelical Lutheran

History
- Status: Parish church

Architecture
- Functional status: Active
- Architect: Georg Greve
- Completed: 1939

Specifications
- Materials: Brick

Administration
- Diocese: Diocese of Oslo
- Deanery: Vestre Aker deanery
- Parish: Røa

Røa Church (Norwegian: Røa kirke) is a church center in Oslo, Norway. The church room has 300 seats, but this can be increased to 500 by opening the sliding doors to the parish hall. The church building also includes offices, a wing of verger housing and daycare. There is an almost separate bell tower (a campanile).

The pulpit and the baptismal font are as old as the church, like Bernhard Greve's stained glass choir window. It replaces an altarpiece and bears the title "Christ After the Resurrection". In the window west of the organ is a round stained glass window showing the Annunciation to the Blessed Virgin Mary. Finn Krafft was commissioned to paint the focal wall around the stained glass. His blue painted wall decoration with a Greek cross was uncovered in October 1964. There are otherwise a tapestry, created by Kristin Sommerfelt from 1984 and two paintings by Lagertha Munthe.

The church organ has 27 voices. The three church bells from 1939 are created by Olsen Nauen Bell Foundry.

Røa Church is listed by the Norwegian Directorate for Cultural Heritage.
