= Fon, Norway =

Village in Tønsberg Municipality, Norway

Fon
- Village
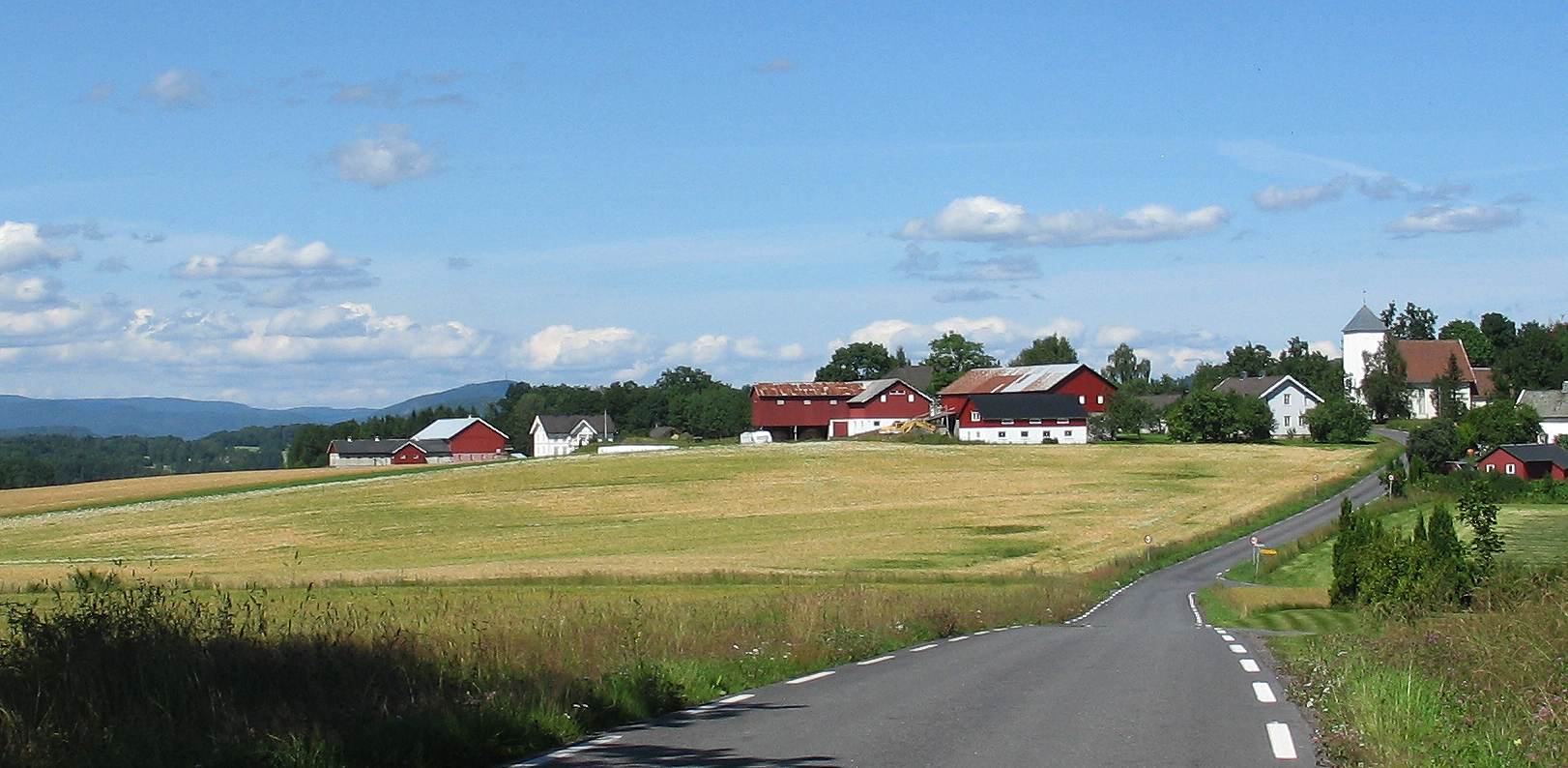
- View of the village
- Interactive map of Fon
- Coordinates: 59.41209°N 10.20628°E
- Country: Norway
- Region: Eastern Norway
- County: Vestfold
- Municipality: Tønsberg Municipality
- Elevation: 102 m (335 ft)
- Time zone: UTC+01:00 (CET)
  - Summer (DST): UTC+02:00 (CEST)
- Post Code: 3164 Revetal

Fon is a village in Tønsberg Municipality in Vestfold county, Norway. The village is located about 3 kilometres (1.9 mi) to the west of the village of Svinevoll, about 6 kilometres (3.7 mi) to the northwest of the village of Revetal, and about 20 kilometres (12 mi) to the northwest of the city of Tønsberg.

The area is a fairly rural, agricultural area. Fon hosts a small music festival called Revårock, held here since 2002. Fon Church is located in the village.

== School ==
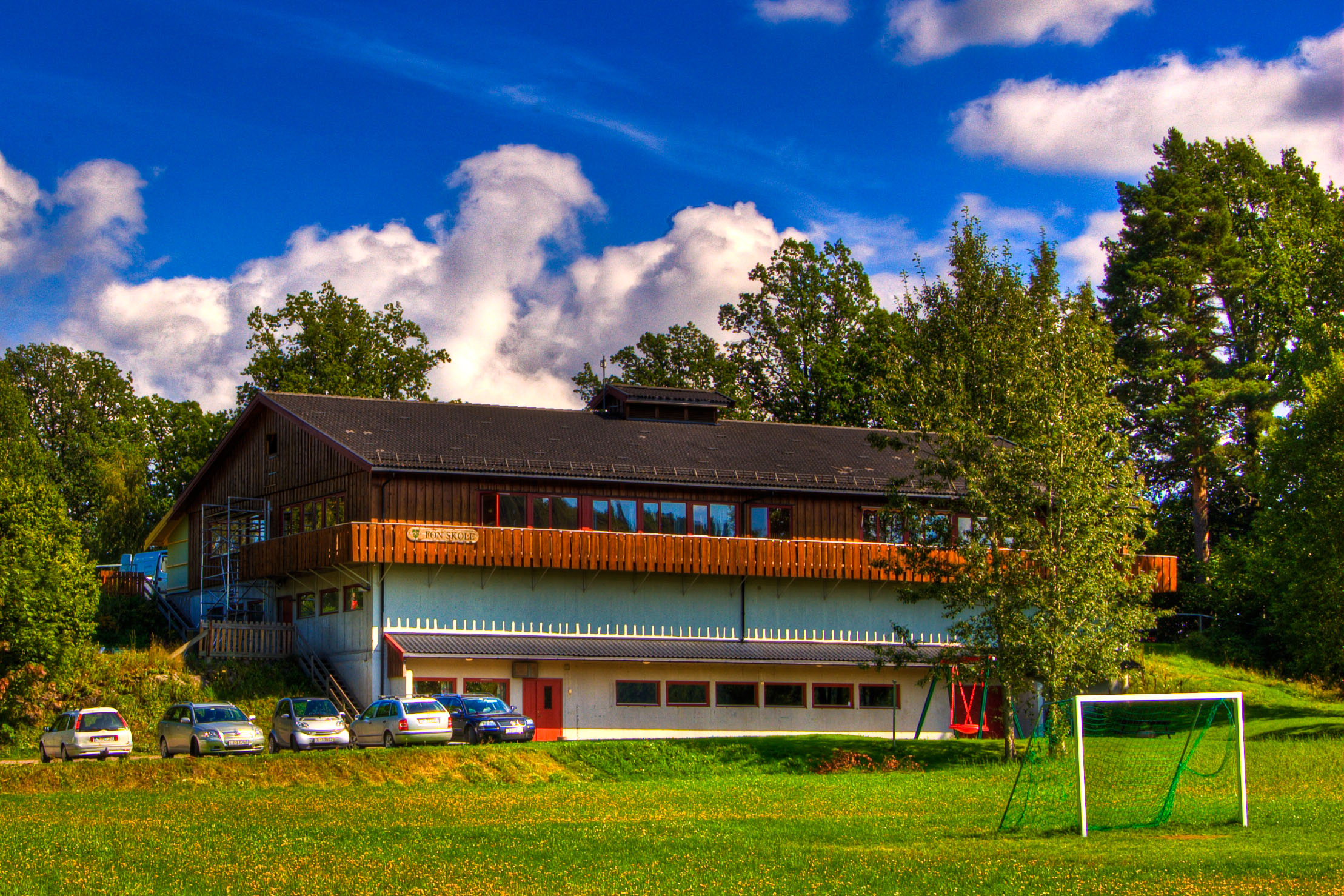
Fon Primary School, August 2009

The Fon Primary School operated in Fon from 1987 until the summer of 2009. It served children from first to fourth grade, and it was part of the Fon Early Development Center and Primary School (Norwegian: Fon oppvekstsenter), along with the Vivestad and Fon preschools. Since 2009, the area's children have attended the Kirkevoll Primary School in Brekkeåsen.
