= Våle Church =

Church in Vestfold, Norway

- Våle kirke
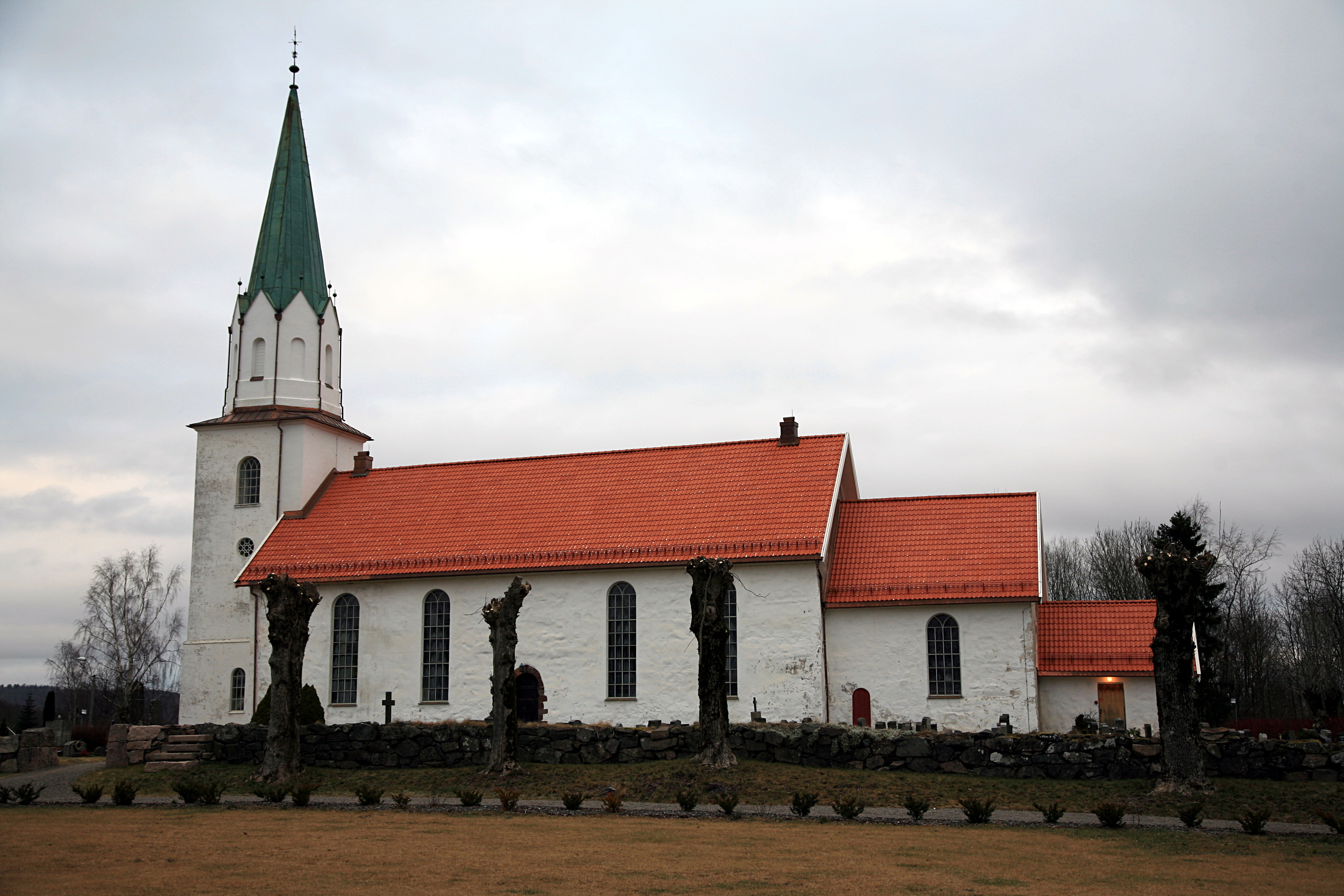
- View of the church
- Våle Church
- 59°25′11″N 10°16′36″E
- Location: Tønsberg Municipality, Vestfold
- Country: Norway
- Denomination: Church of Norway
- Previous denomination: Catholic Church
- Churchmanship: Evangelical Lutheran

History
- Status: Parish church
- Founded: c. 11th century
- Consecrated: c. 1190

Architecture
- Functional status: Active
- Architectural type: Long church
- Style: Romanesque
- Completed: c. 1190 (836 years ago)

Specifications
- Capacity: 244
- Materials: Stone

Administration
- Diocese: Tunsberg
- Deanery: Tønsberg domprosti
- Parish: Våle
- Norwegian Cultural Heritage Site
- Type: Church
- Status: Automatically protected
- ID: 85883

Våle Church (Norwegian: Våle kirke) is a parish church of the Church of Norway in Tønsberg Municipality in Vestfold county, Norway. It is located in the village of Kirkevoll. It is the church for the Våle parish which is part of the Tønsberg domprosti (deanery) in the Diocese of Tunsberg. The white, stone church was built in a long church design around the year 1190 using plans drawn up by an unknown architect. The church seats about 244 people.

== History ==
The earliest existing historical records of the church date back to the year 1346, but the church was not built that year. The first church in Våle was likely a wooden church that was probably built during the 11th century. The area of Våle was Christianized by Olaf Tryggvason during the 900s, and the first church was likely built after that time. The Våle area has many pre-Christian burial mounds, so the area must have been an important site before Christian times.

Around the year 1190, the old wooden church was torn down and replaced with the present Romanesque stone church. The church is said to have been built by Danish and German craftsmen. Originally, the church was far simpler than today. It was likely just the nave and chancel (no sacristy, church porch, or bell tower). The original church may have had a small clock tower on the roof. The nave and chancel were both built in a rectangular shape, but the inside of the chancel had a curved apse. The church was dedicated to Saint Olav on Saint Sunniva's Day (July 8).

In 1673, the Count of Jarlsberg took over ownership of the church from the King of Denmark-Norway. Soon after, the Count decided to renovate the church. The church underwent a big renovation. Then again in 1747, the church underwent another large renovation and expansion. The old chancel was torn down and the nave was extended 8 metres (26 ft) to the east and a new chancel was constructed. Also, a new sacristy was built on the east end of the new chancel. The interior furnishings were also replaced during this period.

Due to financial difficulties, Count Gustav Wilhelm Wedel had to sell the county's churches. He sold Våle Church in 1770 to the merchant Hegaard in Holmestrand, for 1,200 rigsdaler. Hegaard also had financial difficulties, and eventually declared bankruptcy. The church was then handed over to his son-in-law, the auditor general Jens Flor from Haugeboe in Asker as collateral. Flor sold the church in 1804 to shipowner and merchant Rasmus Alsing from Holmestrand. In 1808, he died and his son inherited the church. The son, Rasmus Alsing, died in 1858, and in 1859 the parish bought the church. In 1871, a new church porch and bell tower were added to the west end of the nave. The interior was changed on the same occasion, including new ceilings and windows. This also included getting rid of the medieval pulpit and limestone baptismal font and replacing them with new ones. The tower was unstable and had to be reinforced several times, most recently in 1951. In 1956–1957, the church interior was renovated and updated. The interior was extensively restored in 2004–2006 and then in 2010 the interior was returned to its 1870 look.

== Media gallery ==
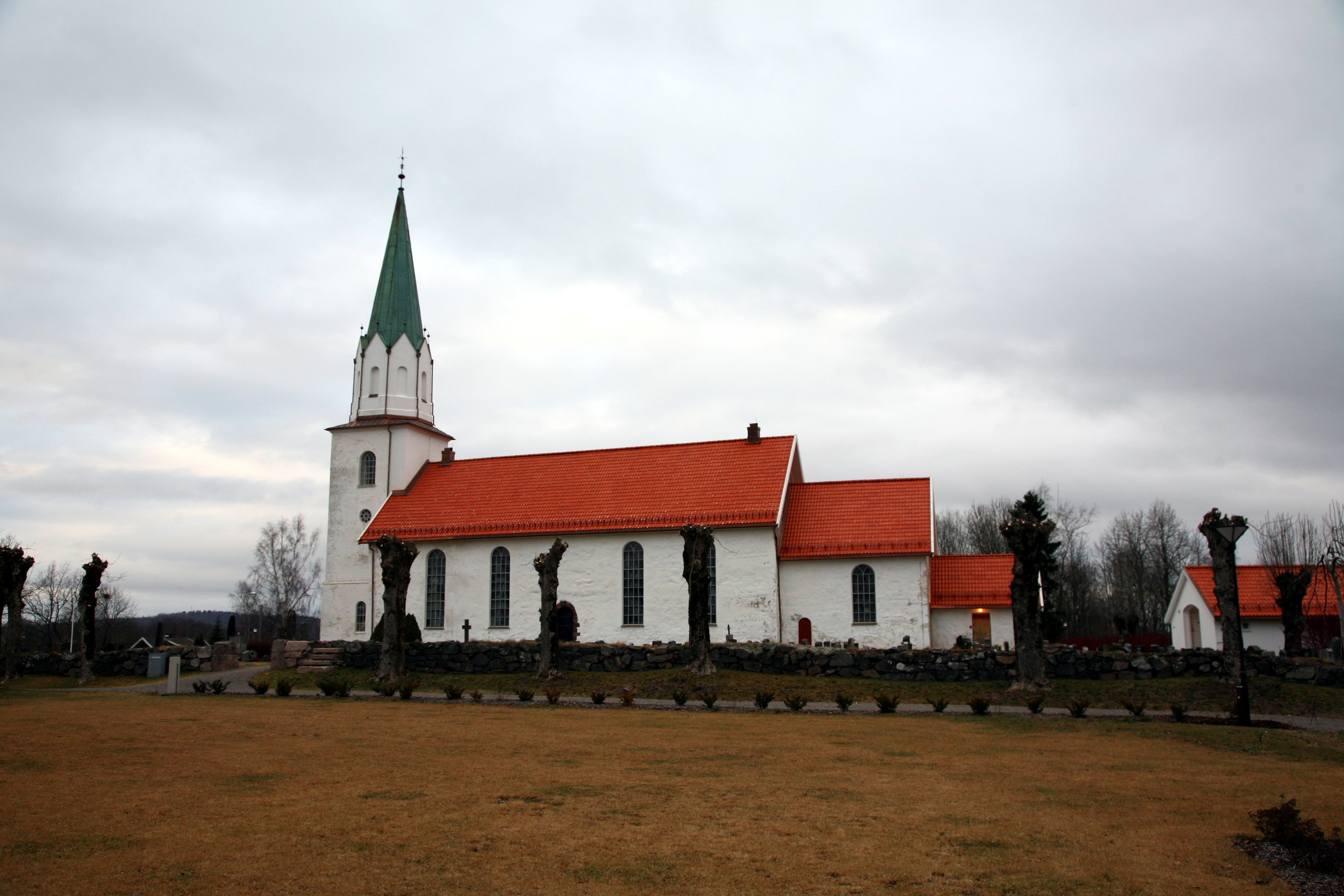

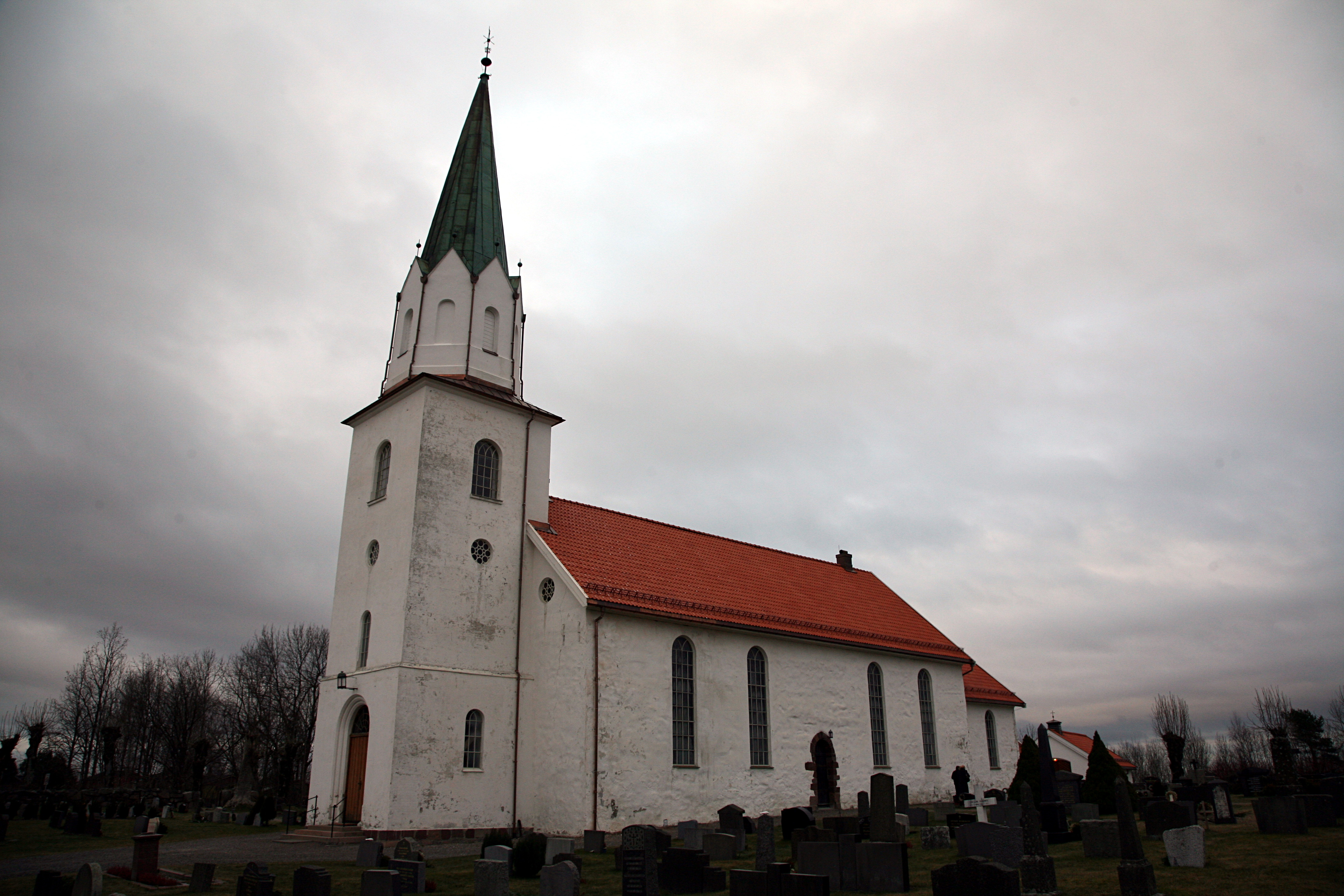

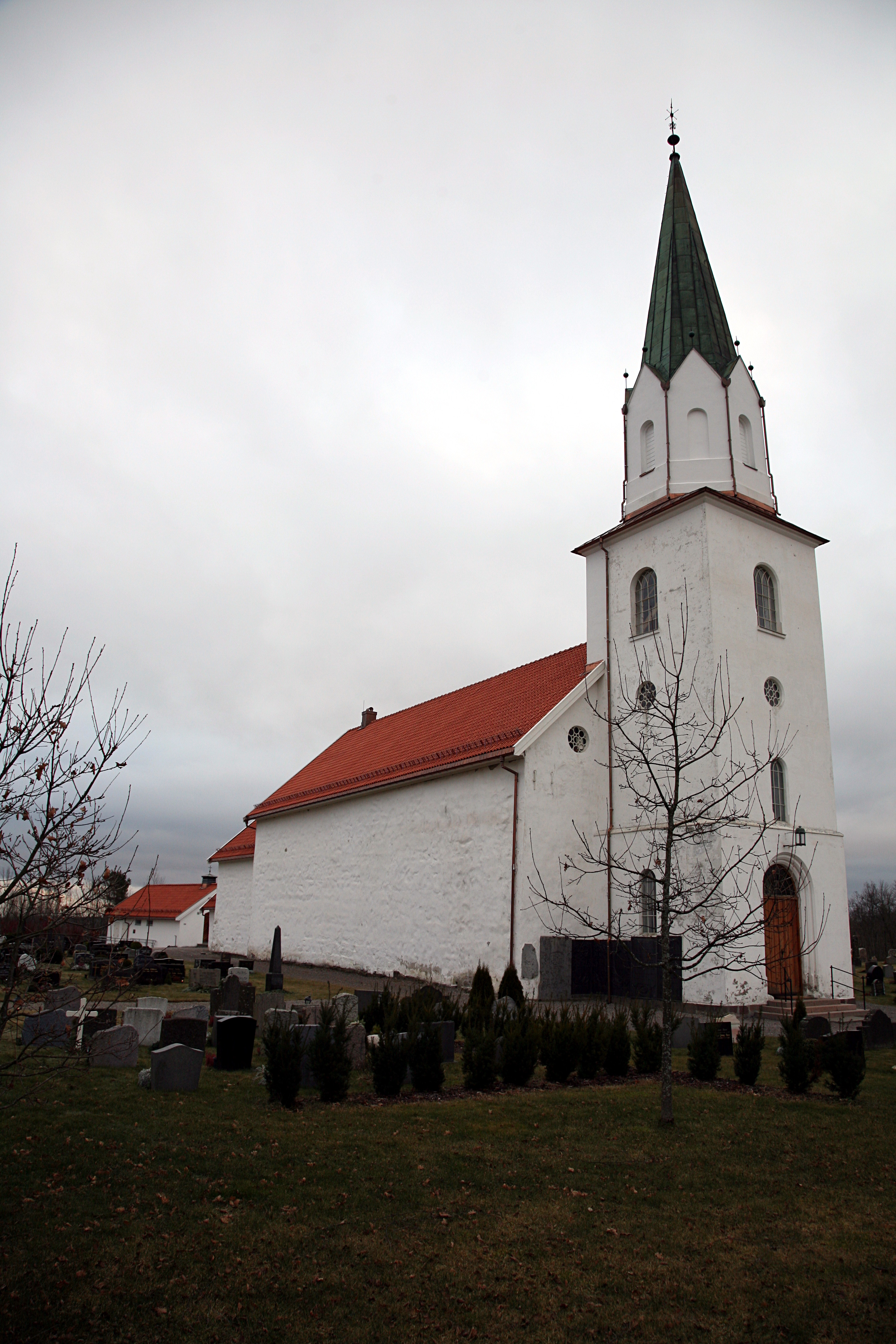

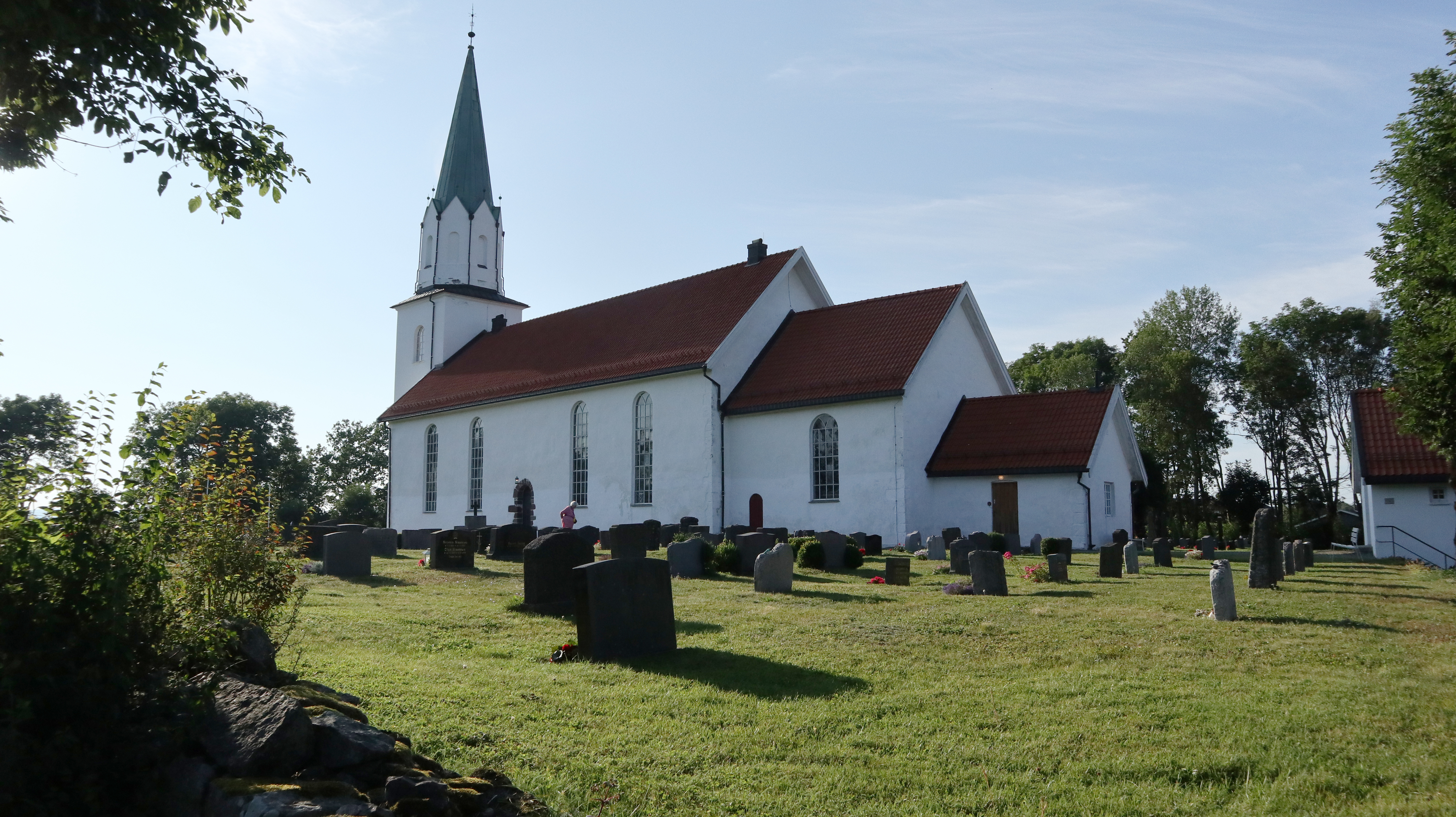

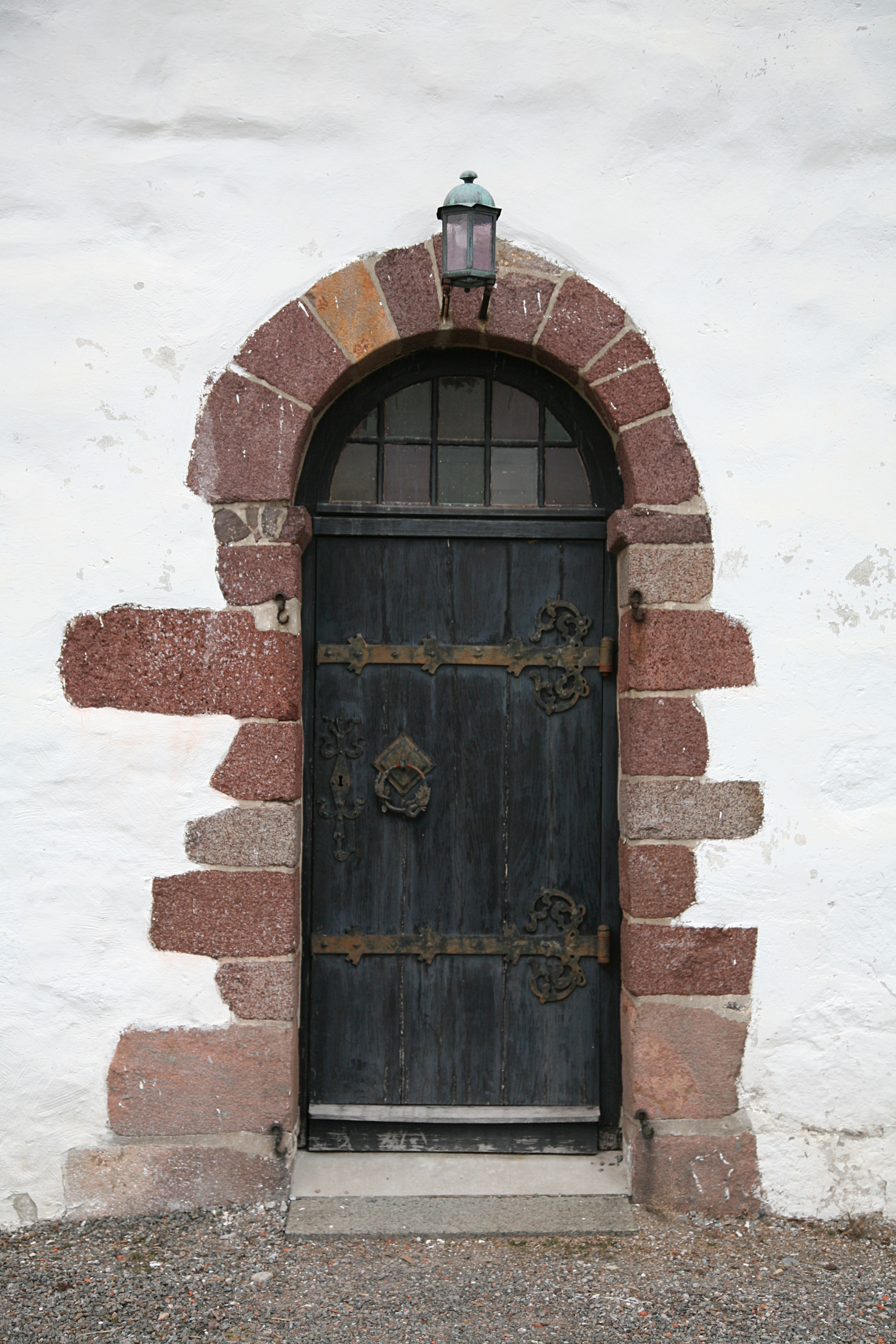

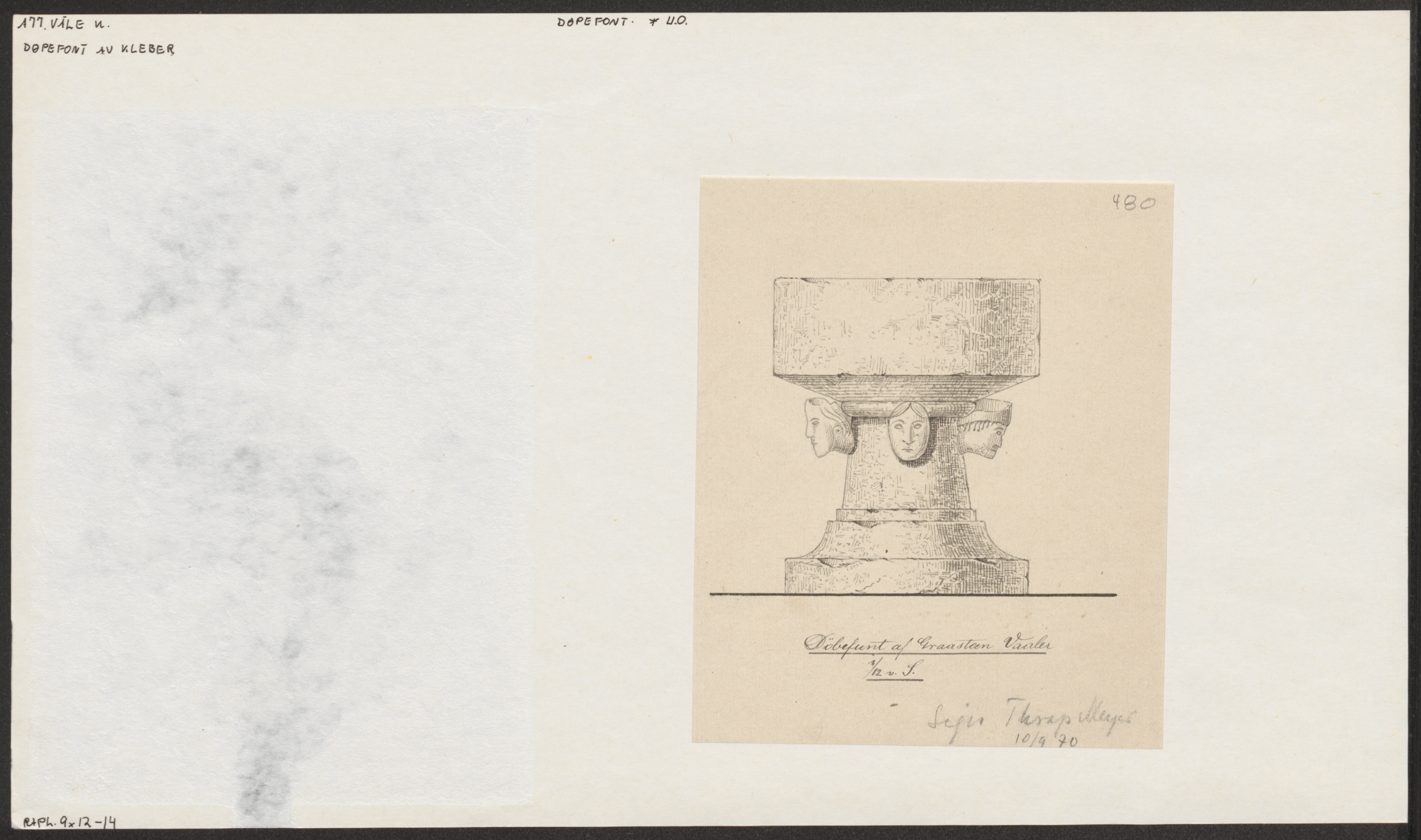

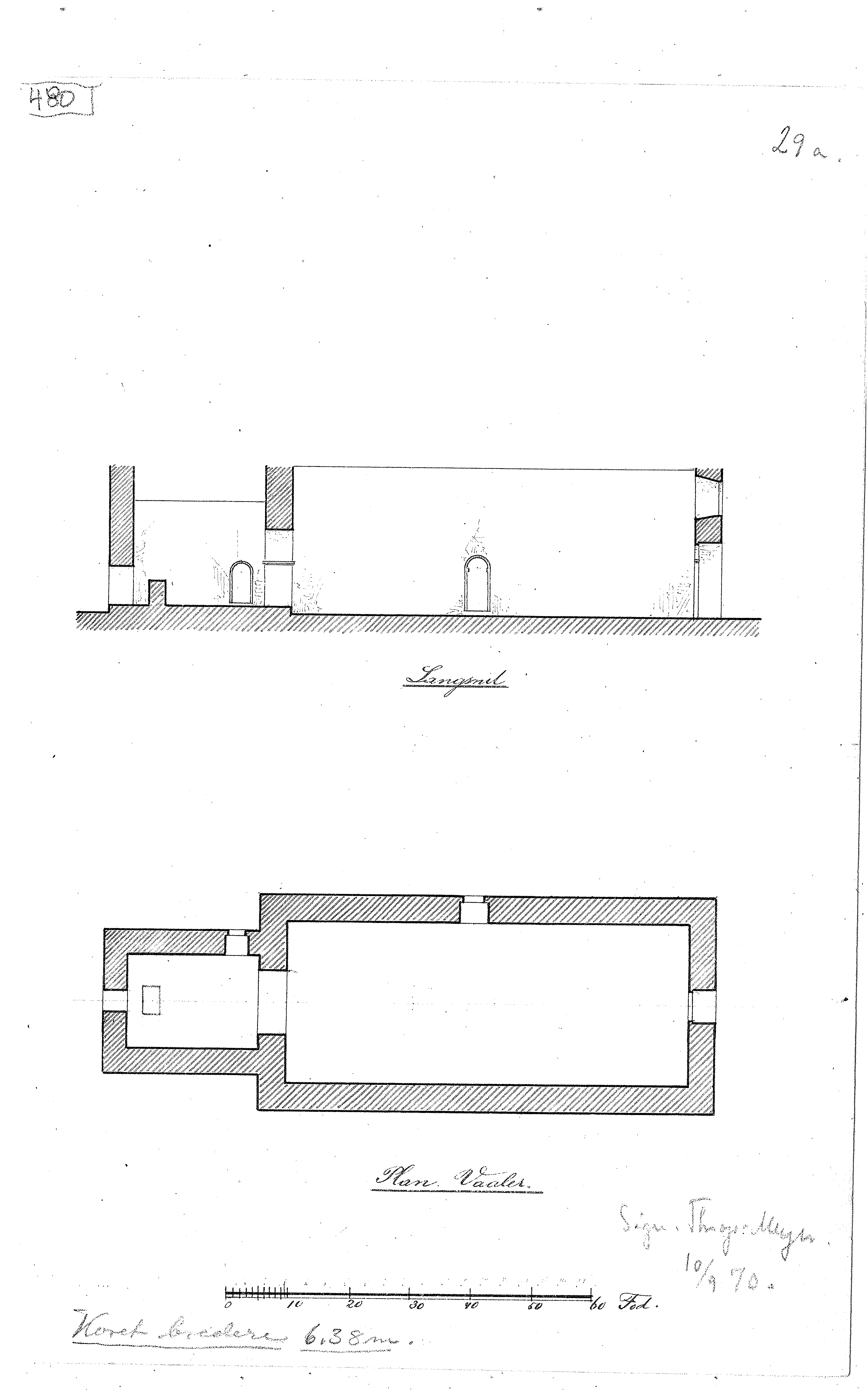

== See also ==
- List of churches in Tunsberg
