= Fon Church =

Church in Vestfold, Norway

- Fon kirke
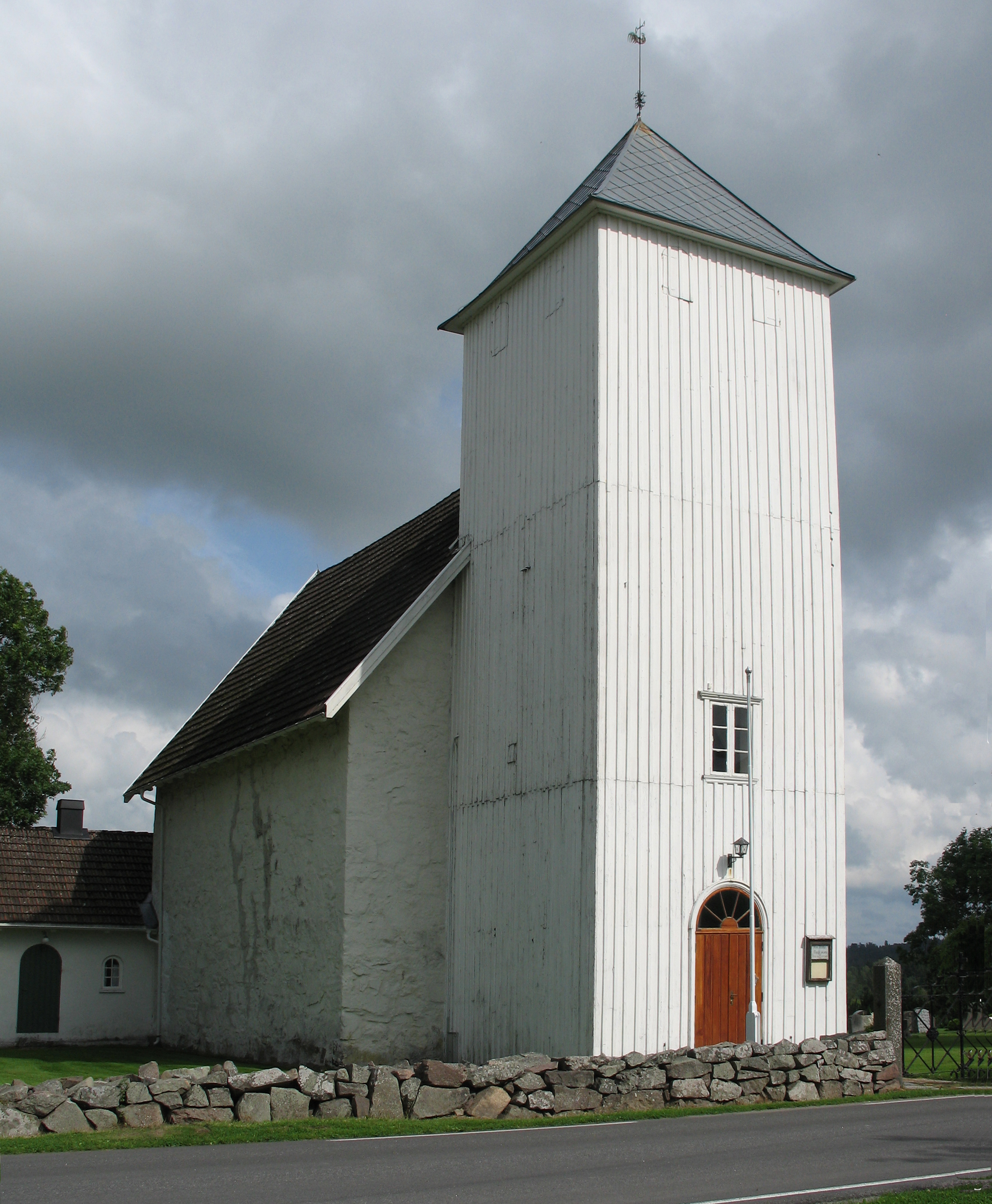
- View of the church
- Fon Church
- 59°24′44″N 10°12′23″E
- Location: Tønsberg Municipality, Vestfold
- Country: Norway
- Denomination: Church of Norway
- Previous denomination: Catholic Church
- Churchmanship: Evangelical Lutheran

History
- Status: Parish church
- Founded: c. 1100
- Consecrated: c. 1100

Architecture
- Functional status: Active
- Architectural type: Long church
- Completed: c. 1100 (926 years ago)

Specifications
- Capacity: 106
- Materials: Stone

Administration
- Diocese: Tunsberg
- Deanery: Tønsberg domprosti
- Parish: Fon
- Norwegian Cultural Heritage Site
- Type: Church
- Status: Automatically protected
- ID: 84179

Fon Church (Norwegian: Fon kirke) is a parish church of the Church of Norway in Tønsberg Municipality in Vestfold county, Norway. It is located in the village of Fon. It is the church for the Fon parish which is part of the Tønsberg domprosti (deanery) in the Diocese of Tunsberg. The white, stone church was built in a long church design around the year 1100, using plans drawn up by an unknown architect. The church seats about 106 people.

== History ==
The earliest existing historical records of the church date back to the year 1359, but the church was not built that year. The old Romanesque stone long church was built in the early 12th century. The original church consisted of the present rectangular stone nave and a smaller, rectangular choir which were built with the typical medieval core-and-veneer walls. Originally, there were portals located on the south wall of the nave and the choir which served as the main entrances to the church.

The church has a pulpit dating from 1603 and an altarpiece from 1633. There are two church bells at Fon Church; both of them were cast at the Olsen Nauen Bell Foundry in Sem. The church's oldest bell is on display at the Olsen Nauen Bell Museum. In 1673, the Count of Jarlsberg took over the ownership of the church from the King. Soon after, the church was described as being in very poor condition. Over the centuries, the church building has been renovated and modified. At some point the south portals were bricked up and closed and a new entrance and bell tower on the west end of the nave was constructed. In 1688, a major renovation of the church took place. The baptismal font was gifted to the church in 1714. In 1768, the indebted Count sold the church to the farmers in the area. A number of repairs were needed in the 19th century. In 1839, the bell tower was removed and a large new wooden tower was built on the west end of the nave. In 1872-1873, Gulbrand Johnsen led a major renovation of the building including a complete overhaul of the interior furnishings. After this, the only thing preserved from the Middle Ages is the soapstone baptismal font. In 1903, the owners of the church gifted the church to the parish. In 1916, a sacristy addition was built to the north of the chancel.

== Media gallery ==
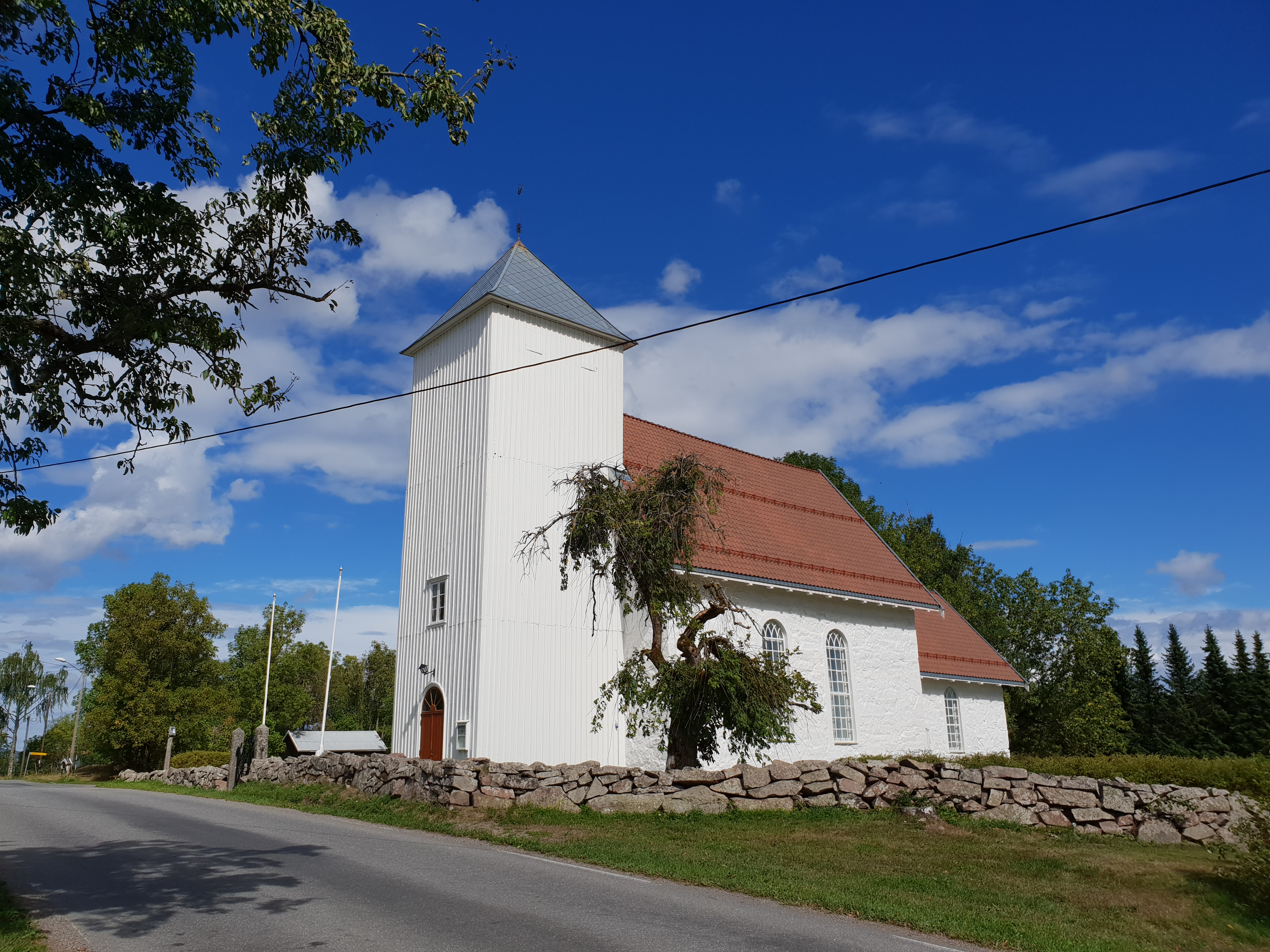

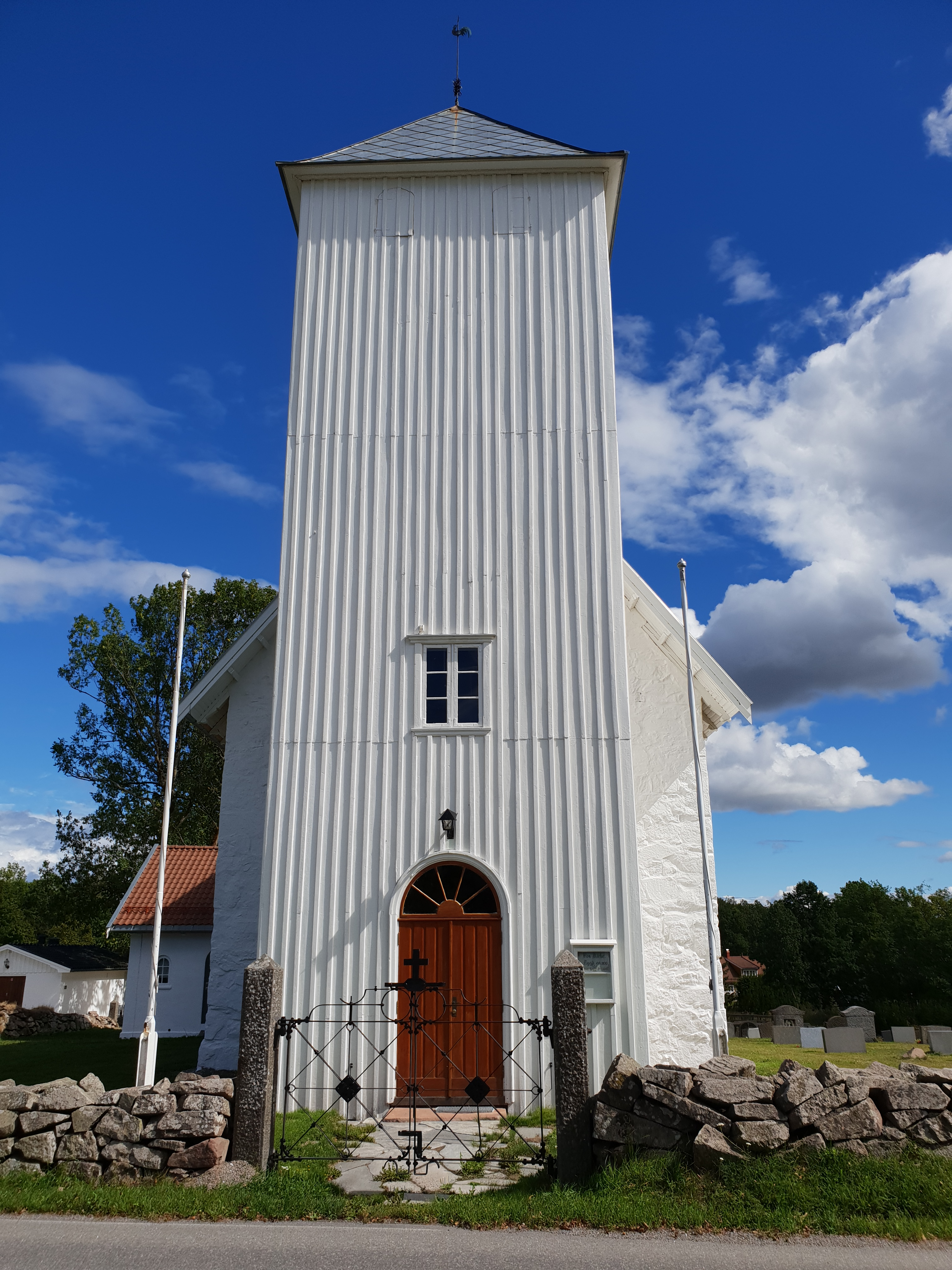

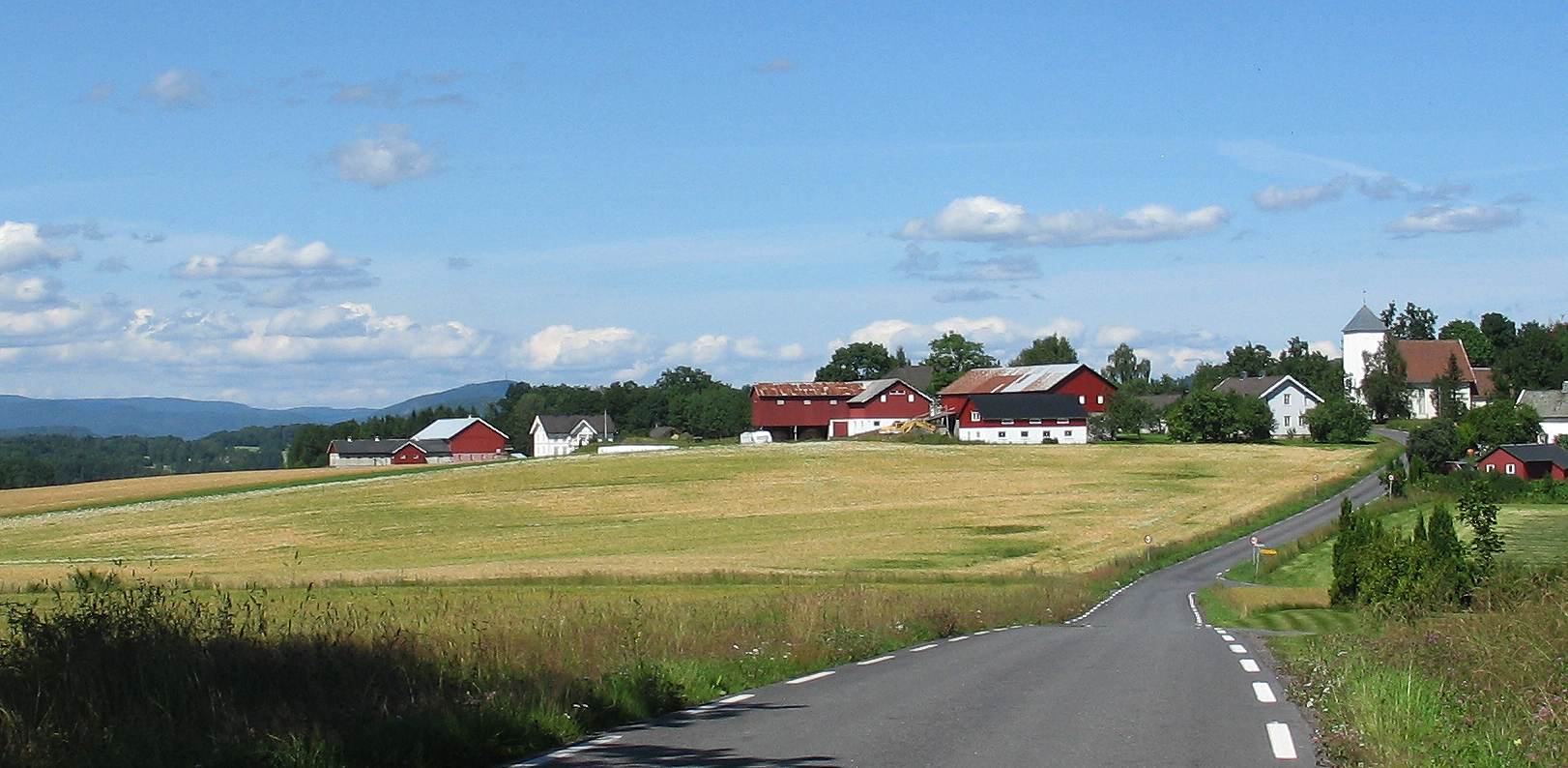

== See also ==
- List of churches in Tunsberg
