= Svinevoll =

Village in Tønsberg, Norway

- Village
- Interactive map of Svinevoll
- Coordinates: 59.41548°N 10.23866°E
- Country: Norway
- Region: Eastern Norway
- County: Vestfold
- Municipality: Tønsberg Municipality
- Elevation: 44 m (144 ft)
- Time zone: UTC+01:00 (CET)
  - Summer (DST): UTC+02:00 (CEST)
- Post Code: 3178 Våle

Svinevoll is a village in Tønsberg Municipality in Vestfold county, Norway. The village is located about 2 kilometres (1.2 mi) to the west of the village of Brekkeåsen, about 2 kilometres (1.2 mi) east of the village of Fon, and about 5 kilometres (3.1 mi) to the north of the village of Revetal.

Historically, Svinevoll was a transportation hub for materials like timber and farm produce such as milk and corn, since there was a railroad that linked Svinevoll to larger cities. Timber production continues to play a part in the Svinevoll economy.
