= Frants Philip Hopstock =

Norwegian priest (1746–1824)

Frants Philip Hopstock (15 November 1746 – 8 October 1824) was a Norwegian priest.

== Biography ==
He was born in Kongsberg as a son of forester Andreas Christian Hopstock (1695–1751) and his wife Maren, née Hofmann Krogh. Both of his parents died when he was still young. He was raised by Frederik Arentz (1702–1779) who was bishop of the Diocese of Bjørgvin. He graduated at Bergen Cathedral School in 1764 and began studying at the University of Copenhagen enrolling as a student in 1764 and graduated with the cand.theol. degree in 1772.

He was a vicar in Skovger and Vaale before becoming dean in Vaale in 1790. In 1797 he became inspector at the newly established teacher's seminary in Tønsberg. Frants Philip Hopstock was also a personal acquaintance of Crown Prince Frederick of Denmark and Norway, who visited him at Vaale in 1798. The Crown Prince was instrumental in appointing Hopstock as vicar in Toten. From 1798 he was vicar in Tønsberg, but the teacher's seminary was disestablished in 1802. He was vicar in Toten from 1808 until his death in October 1840.

In September 1772 he married Anna Elisabeth Lorentzen (1744–1826) from Holmestrand. His daughter Louise Juliane Catharine Hopstock was married to later bishop Mathias Sigwardt from 1792 until her death in November 1815. Sigwardt worked as both curate and seminary inspector under Frants Philip Hopstock.
