= Rånerudåsen =

Village in Tønsberg, Norway

- Village
- Interactive map of Rånerudåsen
- Coordinates: 59.42835°N 10.28799°E
- Country: Norway
- Region: Eastern Norway
- County: Vestfold
- Municipality: Tønsberg Municipality

Area
  - Total: 0.17 km^{2} (0.066 sq mi)
- Elevation: 117 m (384 ft)

Population (2011)
  - Total: 202
  - Density: 1,200/km^{2} (3,100/sq mi)
- Time zone: UTC+01:00 (CET)
  - Summer (DST): UTC+02:00 (CEST)
- Post Code: 3178 Våle

Rånerudåsen is a village in Tønsberg Municipality in Vestfold county, Norway. The village is located about 20 kilometres (12 mi) to the north of the city of Tønsberg, about 2 kilometres (1.2 mi) to the northeast of the village of Brekkeåsen, and about 6 kilometres (3.7 mi) to the west of the village of Nykirke in neighboring Horten Municipality.

The 0.17-square-kilometre (42-acre) village had a population (2011) of 211 and a population density of 1,241 inhabitants per square kilometre (3,210/sq mi). Since 2000, the population and area data for this village area has not been separately tracked by Statistics Norway.
