= Ole Christian Olsen Nauen =

Norwegian bell caster (born 1939)

Ole Christian Olsen Nauen (born 1939) is a Norwegian bell caster.

He is the former owner of the Olsen Nauen Bell Foundry in Tønsberg, a family business that he took over in 1963. Under his leadership, the company further developed and new technology was introduced. Although retired, he continues to work at the company, which is now headed by Morten Olsen-Nauen.

In 2007, Olsen Nauen was awarded the King's Medal of Merit in gold for his work as a bell caster.
