= Mathias Sigwardt Greve =

Norwegian physician (1832–1912)

Mathias Sigwardt Greve (17 September 1832 – 27 December 1912) was a Norwegian physician, best known as the director of Rikshospitalet from 1883 to 1911.

== Personal life ==
He was born in Bergen as a son of curate Arent Wittendorph Greve and Ulrike Eleonore Sigwardt. He was a great-grandson of goldsmith Arent Greve and a grandson of bishop Mathias Sigwardt. In May 1858 in Bergen he married Blanca Olivia Juell (1836–1918). They had two notable children, architect Adolf Bredo Stabell Greve and weaver Ulrikke Eleonore Sigwardt Greve. His daughter Astrid married literary historian Christen Collin.

== Career ==
He enrolled as a student in 1852 and graduated with the cand.med. degree in 1857. He worked as a physician in Kinn from 1857 to April 1858, in May 1858 he was hired at Nordre Trondhjems Amt Hospital in Namdalen. From 1863 to 1864 he studied in Edinburgh, and he later studied in Copenhagen (1864), Germany (1869) and Stockholm (1879). He worked as a physician in Kongsvinger from 1864 to 1865, Vang until 1868 and in Hamar until 1882. From October 1883 to the summer of 1911, he was the director of Rikshospitalet.

Greve released many articles and books, both academic and popular. Important releases in the latter category include Lægebok for norske hjem (1904). He edited the magazine Sundhetsbladet from 1891 to 1894 and 1895 to 1896, and co-edited Sundhetstidende in its sole volume in 1897. In Hamar he was behind the foundation of a handicraft school in 1875. He founded the sanatorium in Gausdal in 1878, was its manager until 1883 and chaired the association Den norske kurstedforening. When living in Kristiania he spoke out against the prostitution there, and was also deputy chairman of Kristiania sedelighetsforening and board member of De norske sedelighetsforeninger. He died in December 1912 in Kristiania.
