= Brekkeåsen =

Village in Tønsberg Municipality, Norway

- Village
- Interactive map of Brekkeåsen
- Coordinates: 59.413031°N 10.28031°E
- Country: Norway
- Region: Eastern Norway
- County: Vestfold
- Municipality: Tønsberg Municipality

Area
  - Total: 0.6 km^{2} (0.23 sq mi)
- Elevation: 122 m (400 ft)

Population (2026)
  - Total: 1,001
  - Density: 1,668/km^{2} (4,320/sq mi)
- Time zone: UTC+01:00 (CET)
  - Summer (DST): UTC+02:00 (CEST)
- Post Code: 3178 Våle

Brekkeåsen or Kirkevoll is a village in Tønsberg Municipality in Vestfold county, Norway. The village is located about 20 kilometres (12 mi) to the north of the city of Tønsberg. The village of Revetal lies about 5 kilometres (3.1 mi) to the south, the village of Svinevoll lies about 1.5 kilometres (0.93 mi) to the west, and the village of Rånerudåsen lies about 1.5 kilometres (0.93 mi) to the northeast.

The mediaeval Våle Church is located in the northern part of the village (which is why that part of the present village is known as Kirkevoll, which literally translates to "church meadow").

The old villages of Kirkevoll and Brekkeåsen grew together over time due to conurbation. Now, Statistics Norway considers them to be one village. The 0.6-square-kilometre (150-acre) village has a population (2026) of 1,001 and a population density of 1,668 inhabitants per square kilometre (4,320/sq mi).
