= Georg Greve (architect) =

Norwegian architect

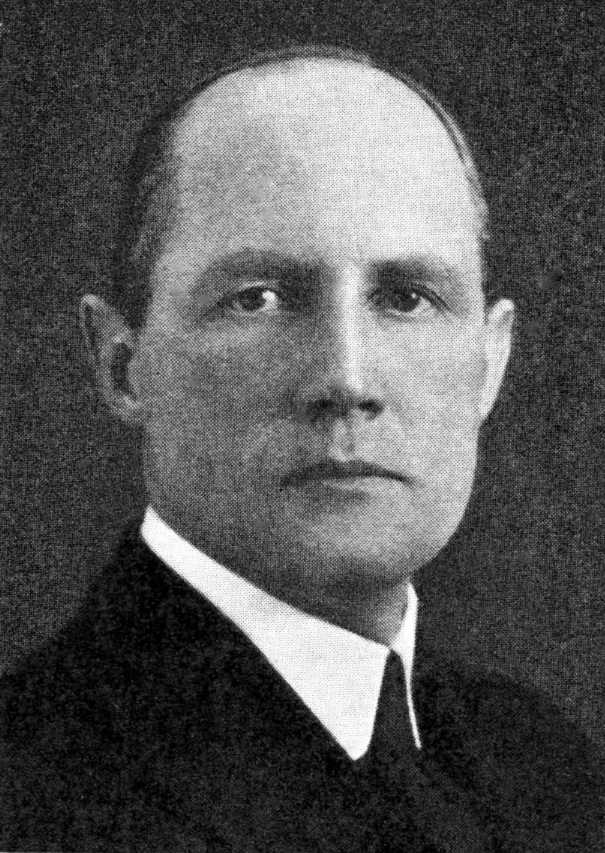
- Born: July 28, 1884; Bergen, Norway
- Died: January 5, 1973 (aged 88); Oslo, Norway
- Occupation: Architect

Georg Jens Greve (July 28, 1884 – January 4, 1973) was a Norwegian architect.

== Biography ==
Greve was born in Bergen. He was the brother of the artist Bernhard Greve (1886–1962), and was the cousin of the architect Bredo Greve (1871–1931) and the weaving and tapestry expert Ulrikke Greve (1868–1951). He is best known for preparing the zoning plan for Bergen together with Albert Lilienberg after the Bergen fire of 1916. Greve is also the single person that had the greatest influence on shaping the modern center of Bergen built between 1920 and 1940.

After taking his university qualifying exams in 1904 and graduating from the first class at the Military Academy in 1905, Greve went to Trondheim, where he was admitted to the Trondheim Technical School (Norwegian: Trondhjems Tekniske Læreanstalt), which he graduated from in 1909. After this he worked with the architects Egill Reimers and Jens Zetlitz Monrad Kielland in Bergen until 1911, and he then headed the Stavanger Cement Factor Architects Office until 1914. He then moved to Stockholm, where he worked with the architect Ragnar Östberg until 1916 and was involved in construction of Stockholm City Hall.

Greve established his own bureau in Bergen in 1916, where he won second prize in the competition for the zoning plan after the fire that same year. In 1923 he was appointed the municipal architect for Aker; he held the position until 1948, when he then became the city architect of Oslo. In 1950 he established his own office in Oslo, and in 1954 he founded the company Greve and Grung Architects (Norwegian: Arkitektene Greve og Grung) together with Geir Grung.

He died in Oslo.

== Selected works ==
- Høybråten Church, 1932
- Nedre Bekkelaget School, 1938
- Sinsen School, 1938
- Røa Church, 1939
- Grefsen Church, 1940
- Tonsen Church, 1961
- Årvoll School, 1961
- Høyenhall School, 1972

== Gallery ==
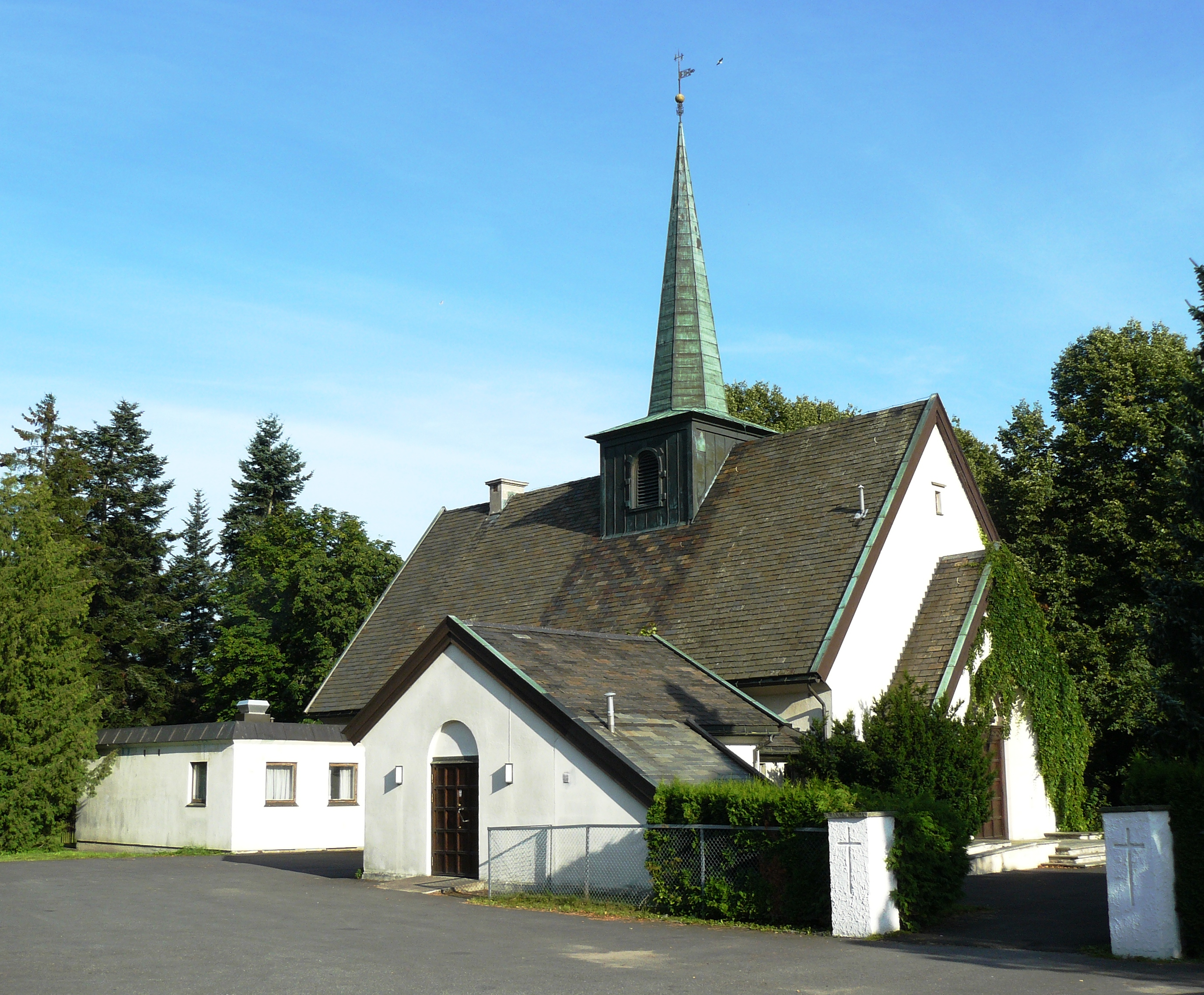
Høybråten Church, 1932

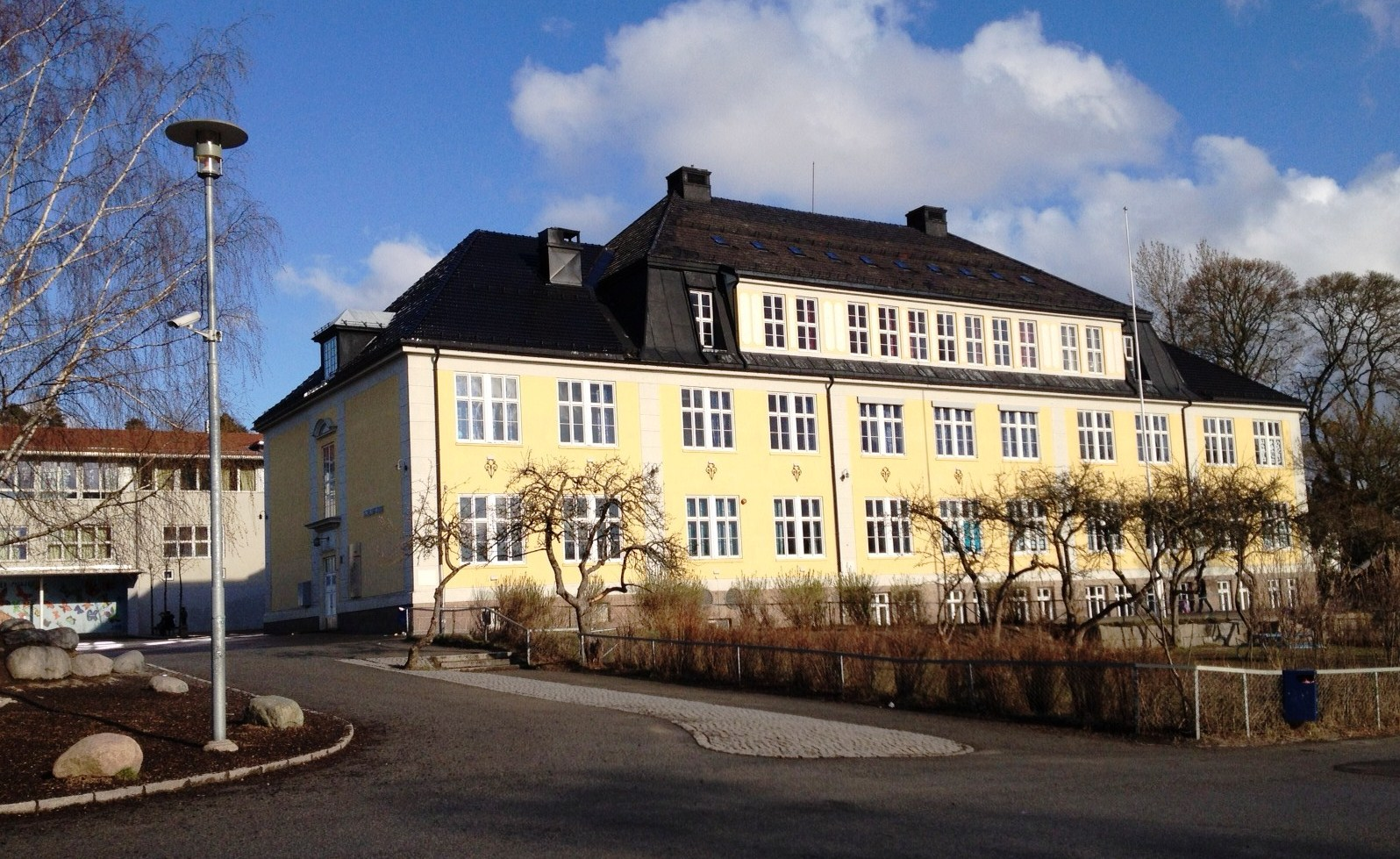
Bekkelaget School, 1938

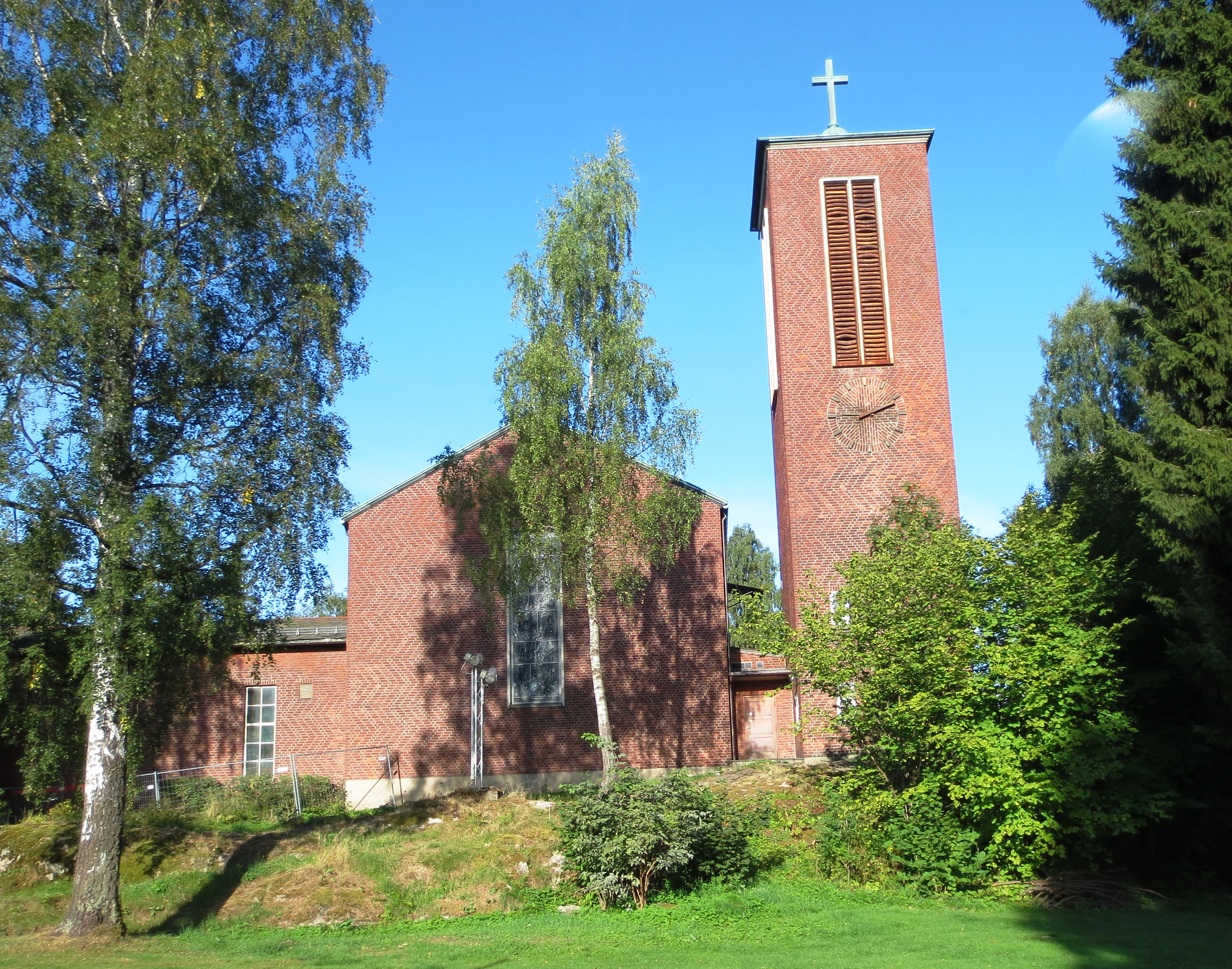
Røa Church,1939

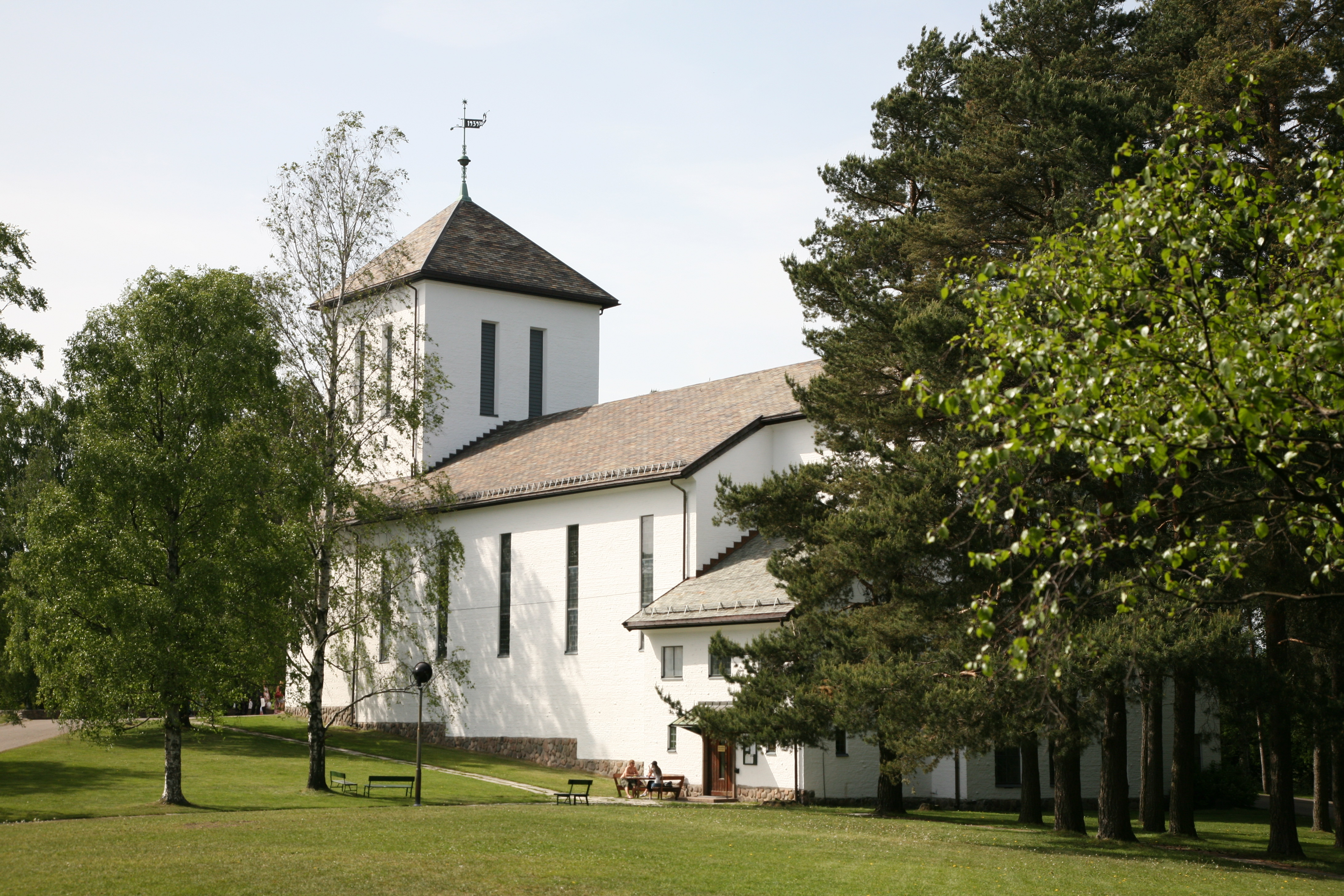
Grefsen Church, 1940

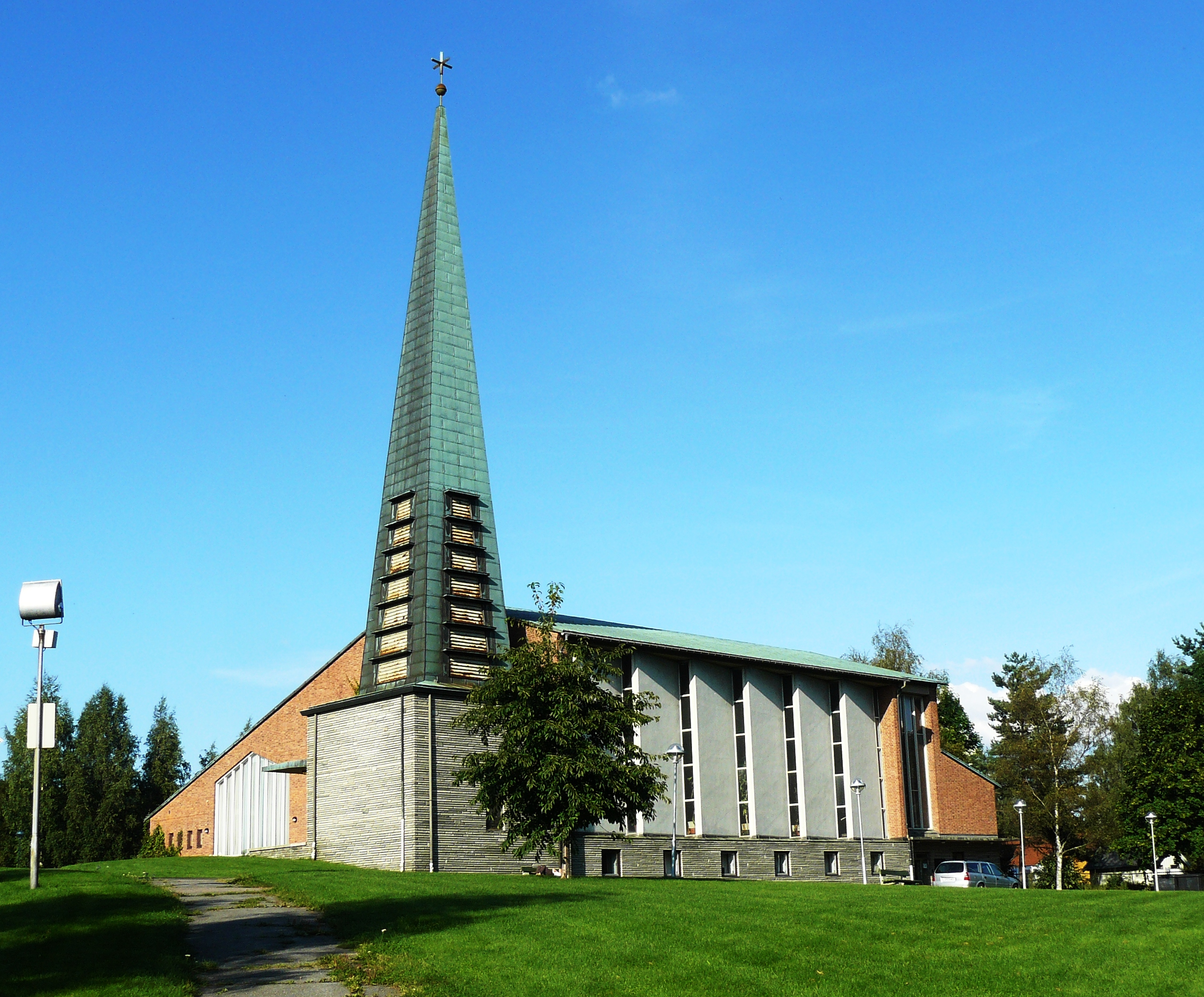
Tonsen Church, 1961
