= Olsen Nauen Bell Foundry =

Bell foundry in Tønsberg, Norway

Coordinates: 59°18′35.770″N 10°21′42.257″E

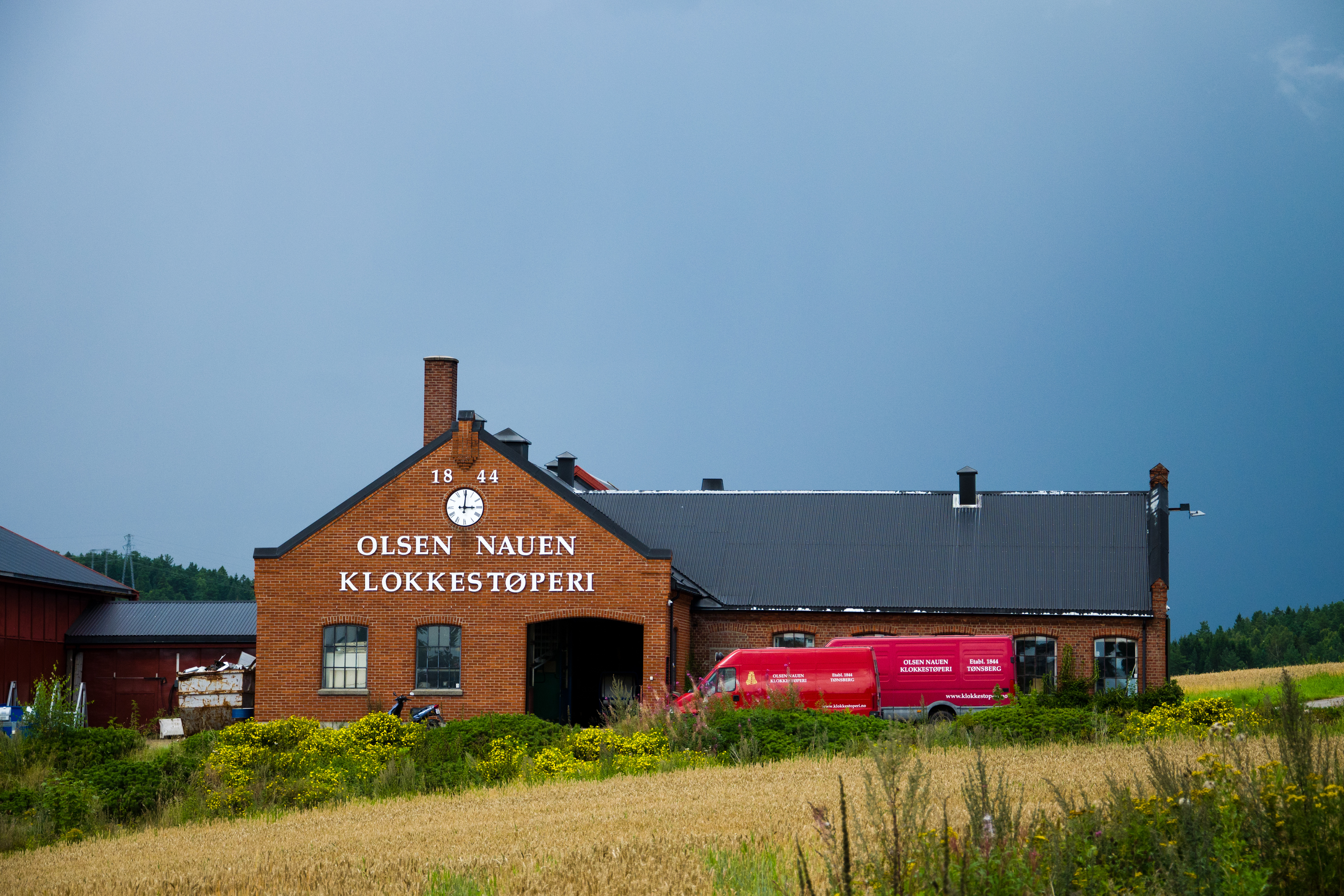
The Olsen Nauen Bell Foundry in Sem, Norway

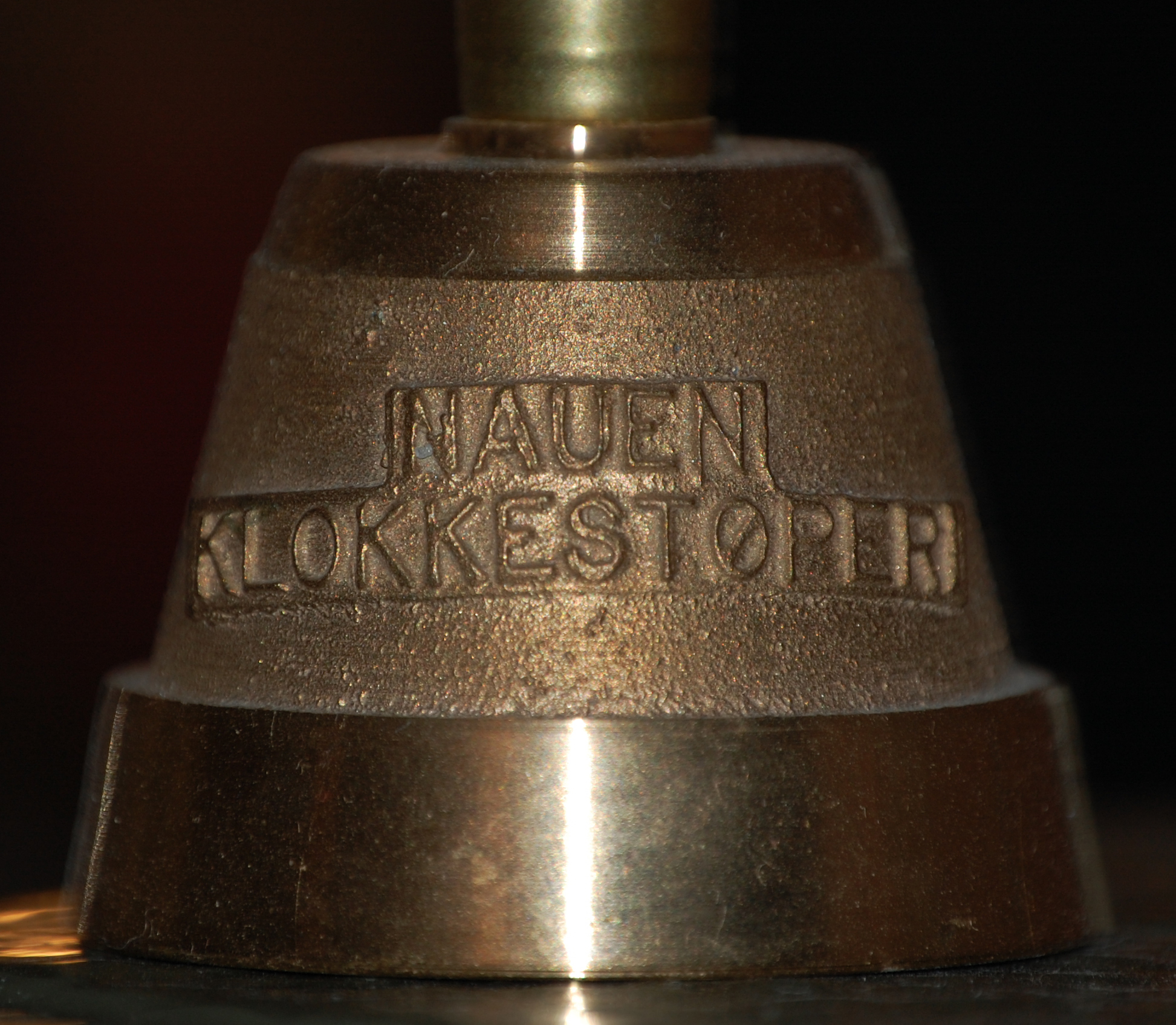
A bell from the Olsen Nauen Bell Foundry

The Olsen Nauen Bell Foundry (Norwegian: Olsen Nauen Klokkestøperi) is a Norwegian bell foundry located in Tønsberg Municipality. The foundry was established in 1844 by Ole Olsen, and it is headed today by the sixth generation of the Olsen Nauen family. The company is based at the Nauen farm in Sem and is Norway's only bell foundry.

The Olsen Nauen Bell Foundry produces glockenspiels, church bells, ship's bells, farm bells, and other products from bell metal, which is a specific alloy of copper and tin. The company has supplied bells to most Norwegian churches. Part of its production is exported, some to mission churches and also to other clients. Examples of carillons cast by Olsen Nauen include the ones in Oslo City Hall, Oslo Cathedral, Sem Town Hall in Tønsberg, and Trinity Church in Arendal. The company has also produced a 52-bell travelling carillon, which is the world's largest.

The Nauen farm also has a small museum with a display of old and new bells. Among other items, it includes the old bell from Fon Church.

The current head of the company is Morten Olsen-Nauen. In 2007, his father Ole Christian Olsen Nauen was awarded the King's Medal of Merit in gold for his activity.
