= Bredo Greve =

Norwegian architect (1871–1931)

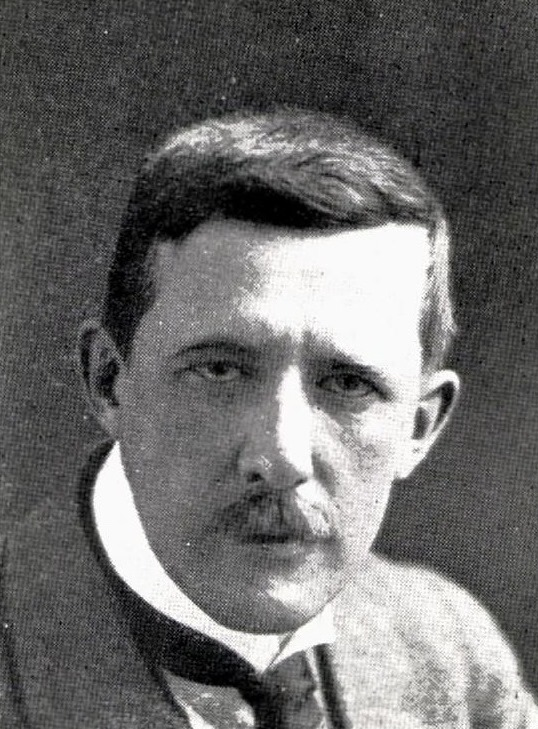
- Born: 28 June 1871; Hamar, Hedmark, Norway
- Died: 30 March 1931 (aged 59)
- Education: Technische Universität Berlin (1893–1895)
- Occupations: Architech; Engineer
- Spouse: Esther Hougberg
- Children: Anita Greve
- Parents: Mathias Sigwardt Greve (father); Blanca Olivia Juell (mother)
- Relatives: Ulrikke Greve (sister); Georg Greve (cousin)

Adolf Bredo Stabell Greve (28 June 1871 – 30 March 1931) was a Norwegian architect.

== Biography ==
Greve was born at Hamar in Hedmark, Norway. He was a son of Mathias Sigwardt Greve (1832–1912) and Blanca Olivia Juell (1836–1918). He was a brother of Ulrikke Greve (1868–1951) and cousin of architect, Georg Greve.

Greve was educated at the Technische Hochschule in Berlin-Charlottenburg which he attended from 1893 to 1895. He was trained a both an architect and engineer. After that he worked as an assistant to professor and architect Bruno Schmitz in Berlin until 1897, went he started his own practice in Oslo.

In 1901, Greve won third prize in the competition for the main building of the newly established Norwegian Technical College at Trondheim which was completed in 1910. In 1921, he won the competition for building at the Norwegian School of Business at Bergen. He also designed the Norwegian Veterinary College in Oslo (1912-1925) and the main building of the Norwegian Institute of Public Health (1930).

In 1902, he married Esther Hougberg (1878–1939), daughter of the Finnish Senator Sven Wilhelm Hougberg. Their daughter Anita Greve was a painter. Greve was appointed Knight of the 1st Class in the Order of St. Olav in 1910. He was also chairman of Norwegian Architects National Association (NAL) in the period 1916 to 1920.

== Selected works ==
- Norges Brannkasse (1897 with Heinrich Jürgensen, and demolished 1977)
- Norwegian Museum of Decorative Arts and Design (1904 with Ingvar Hjorth)
- Norwegian Institute of Technology (1914)
- Norwegian Veterinary College (1912-1925)
- Bergen Business School (1921)
- Norwegian Institute of Public Health in Oslo (1929)

== Gallery ==
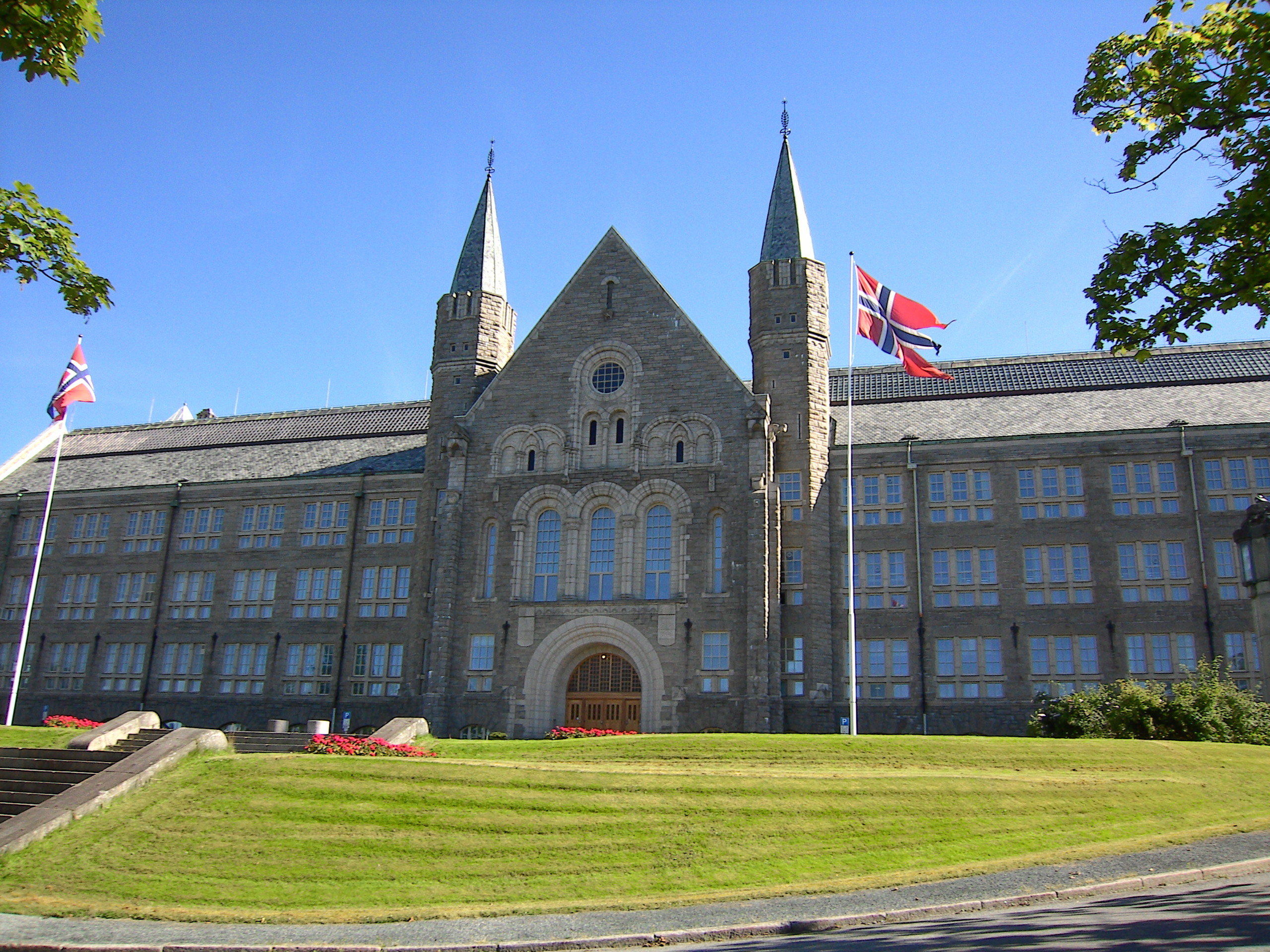
Hovedbygningen, main building at NTNU Gløshaugen, Trondheim (1910–1915)

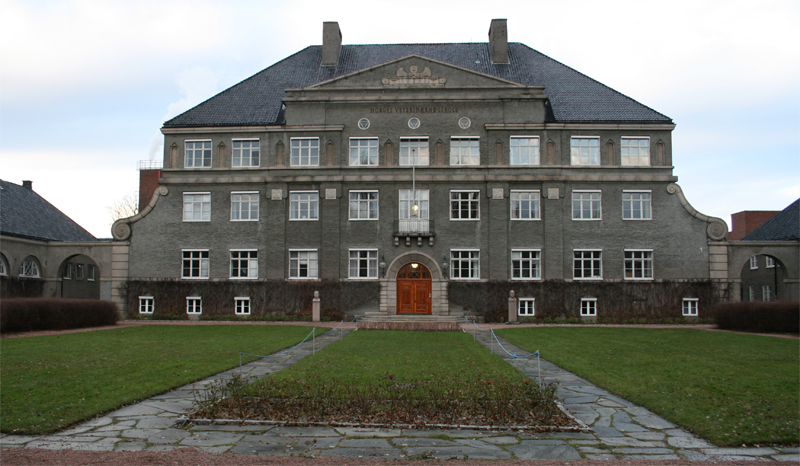
Norwegian Veterinary College (1912-1925)

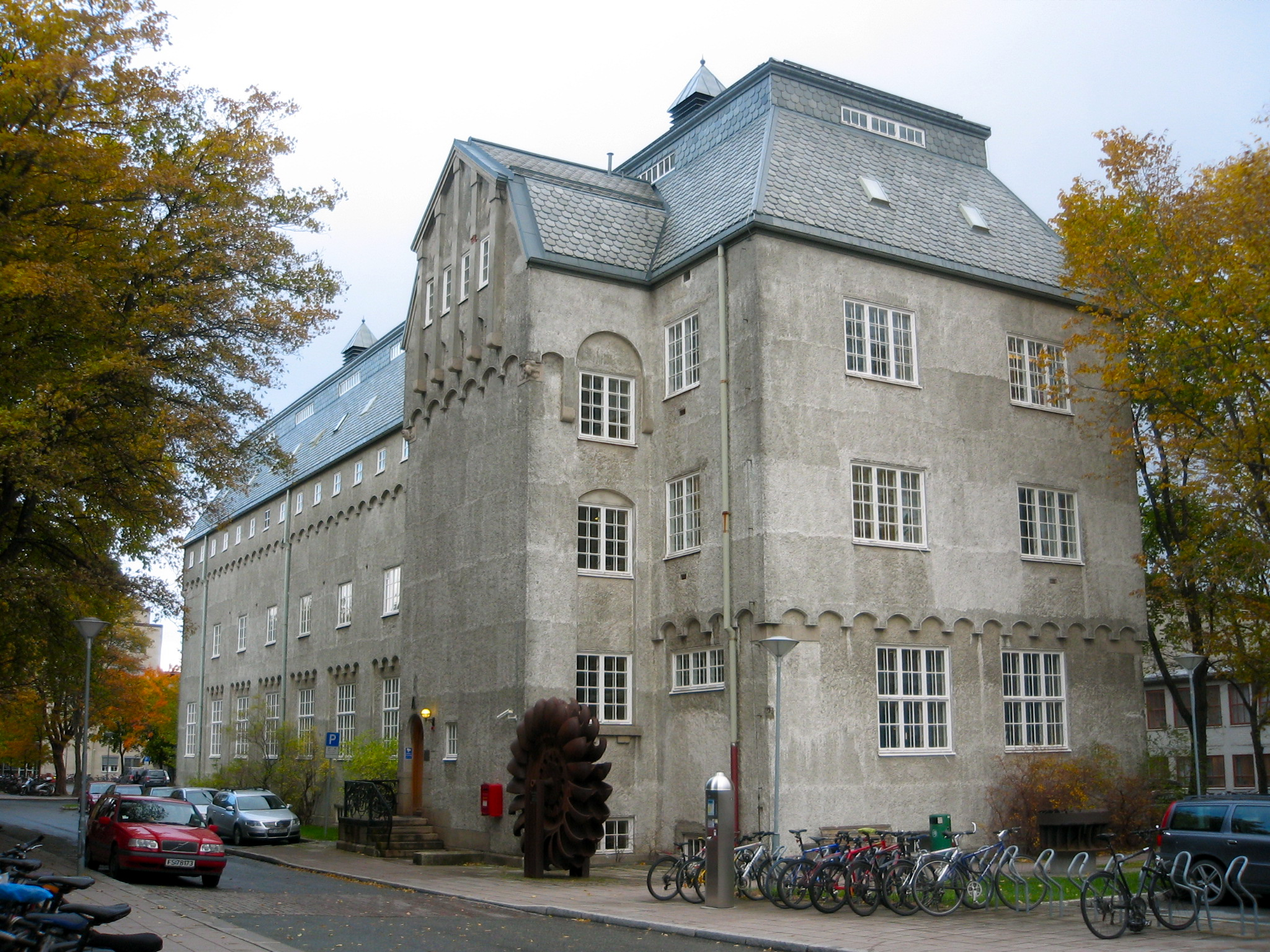
Hydropower Laboratory at NTNU Gløshaugen, Trondheim (1917)

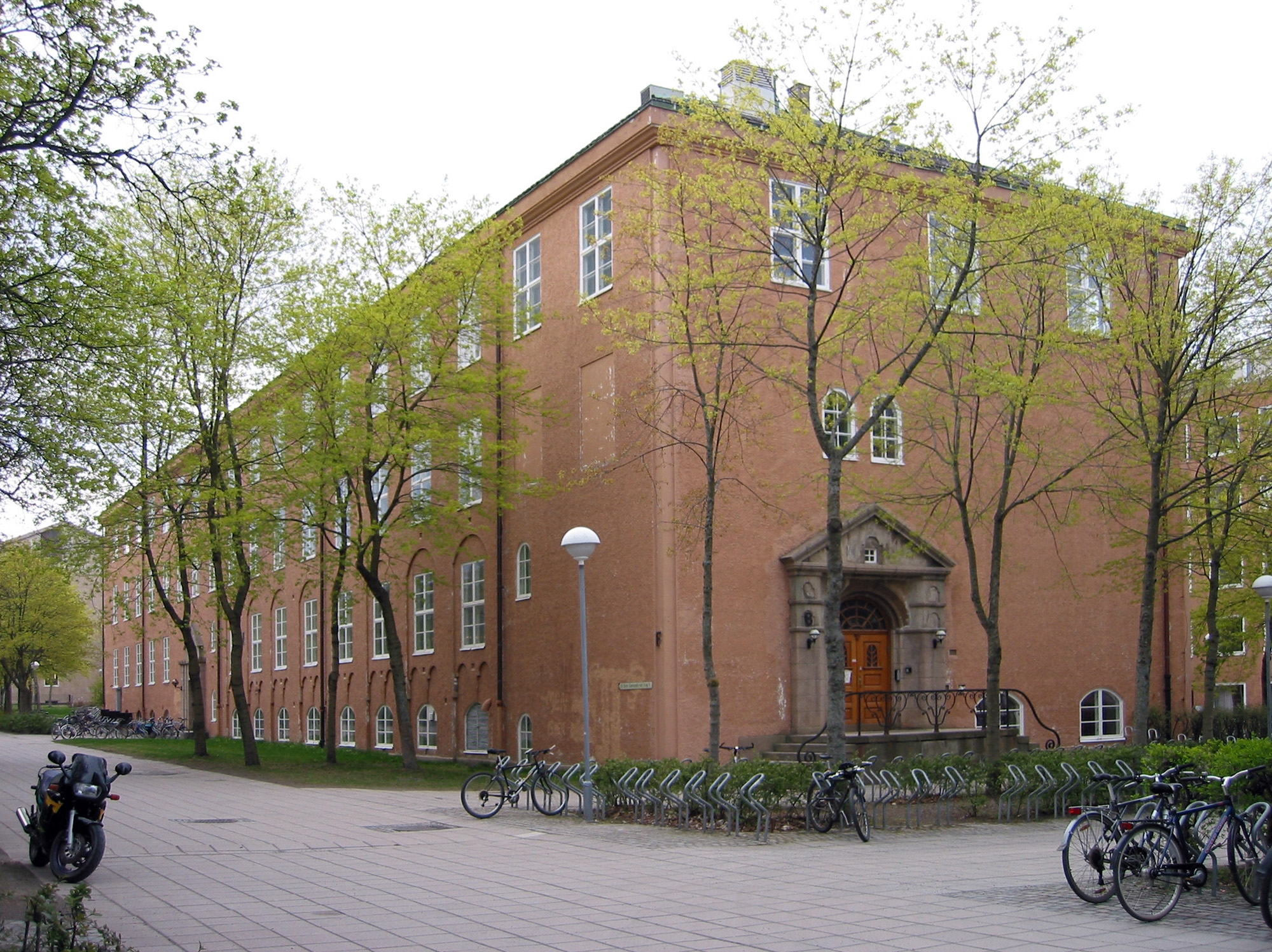
Old Physics Building at NTNU Gløshaugen, Trondheim (1924)
