= Ulrikke Greve =

Norwegian artist (1868–1951)

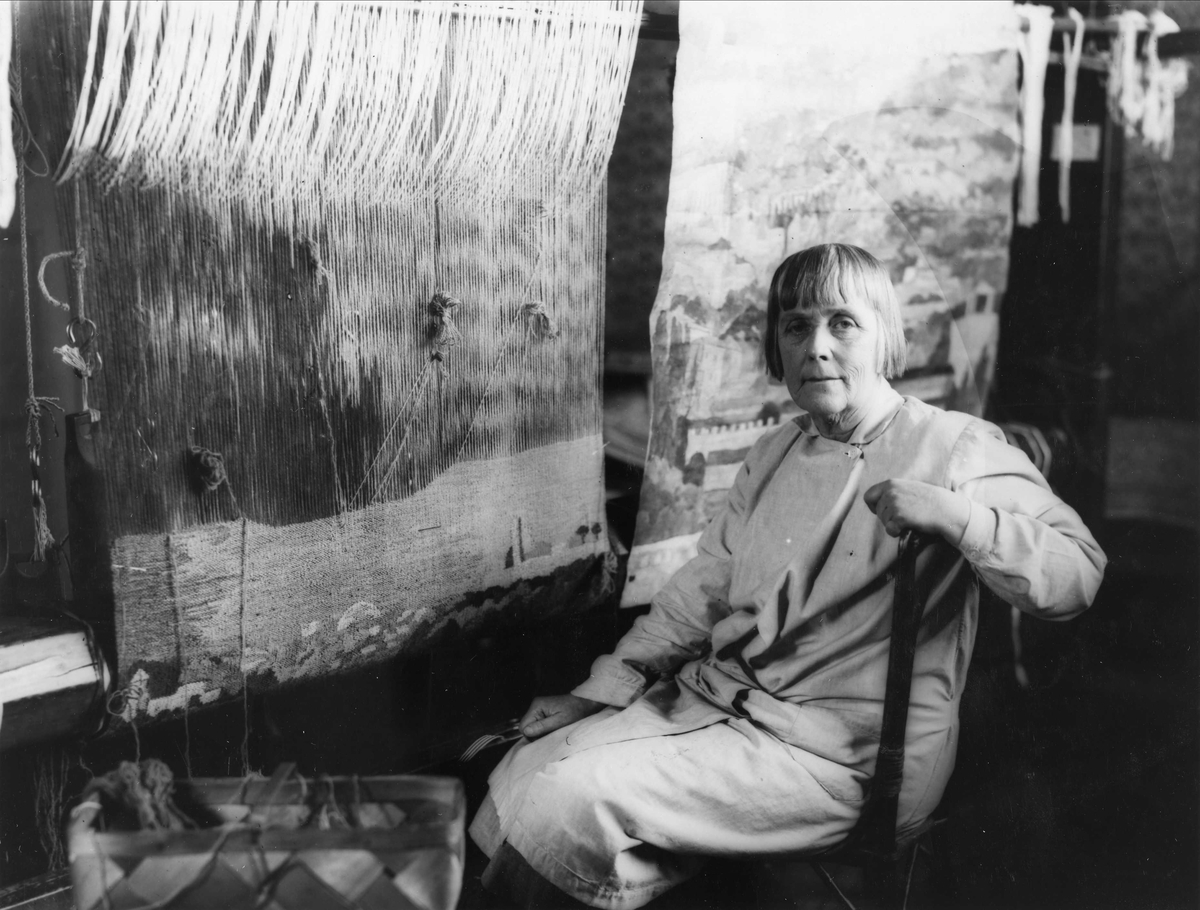
Ulrikke Greve in her studio (c. 1935)

Ulrikke Eleonore Sigwardt Greve (1868–1951) was a leading Norwegian textile artist in the early 20th-century, excelling in tapestry work. In 1900, she was appointed director of the weaving school at the National Museum of Decorative Arts (Nordenfjeldske Kunstindustrimuseum) in Trondheim. From 1905, she taught and produced rugs in the establishment she opened in Oslo. Some were her own creations, others were from designs by artists including Gerhard Munthe and Arne Kavli. Her works can be seen in Oslo City Hall (the Harald Hardråde tapestry) and in museums including the National Museum of Norway.

== Biography ==
Born on 26 May 1868 in Vang Municipality in Hedmark county, Ulrikke Eleonore Sigwardt Greve was the daughter of the hospital director Mathias Sigwardt Greve (1832–1912) and Blanca Olivia Juell (1836–1918). She was the sister of the architect Bredo Greve and the writer Signe Greve Dal. In 1895, she married the pharmacist Carl Mathias Ulstrup Dahle but the marriage was dissolved in 1902.

Ulrikke Greve was raised in a well-to-do culturally-oriented home. Her father, a medical doctor who later headed the National Hospital, had founded Norway's first handicraft school in Hamar in 1875. She graduated as a pharmacist in 1892 but turned to decorative weaving, receiving instruction from Augusta Christensen. Soon one of the country's best weavers, she taught in rural Nordfjord until she was invited in 1900 to head the weaving school at the Arts and Crafts Museum in Trondheim. After undergoing further training in Copenhagen, she led the school to prominence in 1904 when 17 tapestries were produced. They won gold medals at the world's fairs in St. Louis (1904) and Liège (1905).

In 1905, she moved to Christiania where she founded her own school, Norsk Kunstvæv, which proved very popular. She developed her own manufacturing facilities, producing rugs designed by famous artists in addition to those she designed herself. She gained a reputation as an outstanding proponent of weaver-artist collaboration, thanks to her expertise in regard to yarn, colours and technique. Her most important work Blaa skog was the result of her collaboration with Arne Kavli which bordered on Impressionism, transforming Norway's traditional weaving designs into the world of contemporary art.

Her last major work was the creation of tapestries for the Oslo City Hall, in particular her Harald Hardråde tapestry (1937) based on a small drawing she had discovered. Further work in collaboration with Axel Revold proved increasingly unnerving as she found it difficult to comply with his wishes. On completion of this assignment, she withdrew from weaving. Ulrikke Greve died in Oslo on 2 April 1951.
