= Jacob Liv Borch Sverdrup =

Norwegian educator and farmer

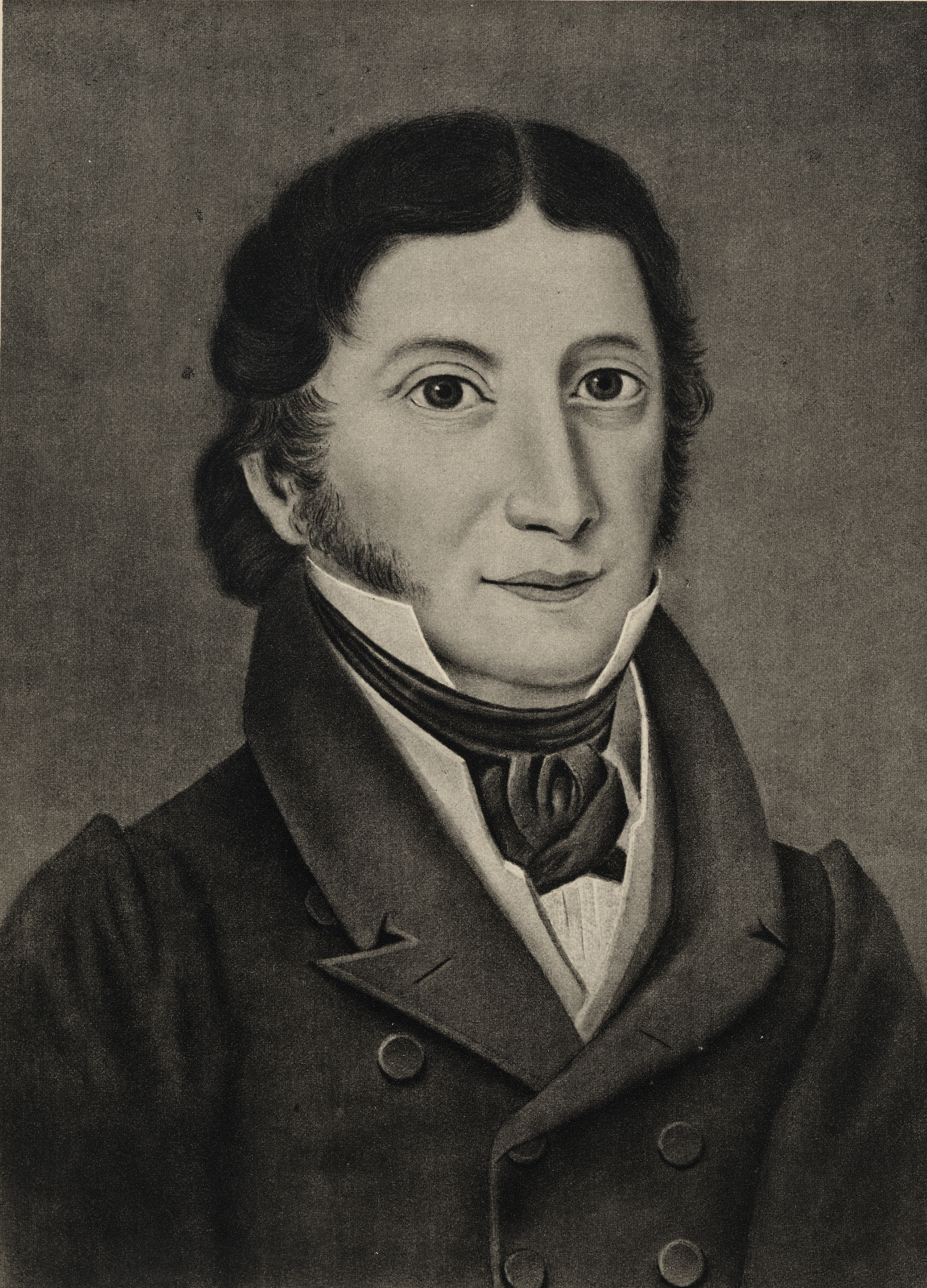
Jacob Liv Borch Sverdrup

Jacob Liv Borch Sverdrup (8 February 1775 – 15 May 1841) was a Norwegian educator and farmer, known for establishing the first agricultural school in Scandinavia.

== Personal life ==
Sverdrup was born at Laugen manor in the prestegjeld of Nærøy as a son of landowner Peter Jacob Sverdrup (1728–1795) and his wife Hilleborg Margrethe Schultz (1743–1828). He was the brother of Georg Sverdrup. He was also a nephew of Jørgen Jørgensen Sverdrup.

He was married twice. From August 1801 he was married to Gundelle Birgitte Jean, who died in December 1820). In March 1826 he married Nicoline Schjelderup (1789–1840). From the first marriage he had the sons Harald Ulrik Sverdrup and Johan Sverdrup. The latter served as Prime Minister of Norway from 1884 to 1889. Through Harald Ulrik Sverdrup he was the grandfather of Jakob Sverdrup, Harald Ulrik Sverdrup, Jr, Georg Sverdrup and Edvard Sverdrup. Through his daughter Livia Sverdrup he was a grandfather of Jonas Smitt, Jakob Sverdrup Smitt and Livius Smitt. He was also a great-grandfather of Jakob Sverdrup, Georg Johan Sverdrup, Harald Sverdrup and Leif Sverdrup.

== Career ==
The son of landowners, Sverdrup embarked on an academic career. After attending school in Throndhjem from 1792, he enrolled at the University of Copenhagen in 1794. He mainly studied botany, but also language and history. He worked as a private tutor and teacher in Denmark after studying, but returned to Norway in 1807, the same year as the Gunboat War broke out. While working as headmaster in Kongsberg, he practiced horticulture on the school property. Herman Wedel-Jarlsberg, who was County Governor, hired him as manager Jarlsberg Manor in 1812. In addition to horticultural and agricultural improvements at Jarlsberg, Sverdrup set dairy farming. In 1815 a cheese factory was established. The name Jarlsberg was later used for Jarlsberg cheese, which was first developed by Anders Larsen Bakke in the second half of the eighteenth century, and got its current design in 1956.

In 1825 Sverdrup left Jarlsberg, and bought the farm Nedre Semb in Borre. In the same year he established an agricultural school at this farm, which is recognized as the first of its kind in Scandinavia. A blacksmith and a tool shed were raised as well. The school was not attended chiefly by sons of proprietors, rather by sons of farmers. The theoretical aspect of the education was downplayed in favor of the practical. Nonetheless, Sverdrup also monitored European academic discussions in his field, especially the writings of Albrecht Thaer. Sverdrup published several books, contributed to newspapers and edited the magazines Magazin for Landmanden from 1828 to 1832 and Den erfarne Landmand from 1837 to 1839.

From 1835 to 1840 he was employed by Georg Sverdrup's brother-in-law as manager of Fritzøe Works. His son Peter Jacob continued his work, but the funding for Sem Agricultural School was cut by the Norwegian Parliament in 1836. However, other agricultural schools soon appeared, including schools in Sweden (1834) and Denmark (1837). The Norwegian College of Agriculture followed in 1854. Sverdrup died in May 1841 in Larvik Municipality. A bust of Jacob Liv Borch Sverdrup was raised at the Norwegian College of Agriculture in 1925.
