= Sem Municipality =

Former municipality in Norway

Sem Municipality Sem kommune
- Former municipality
- Sem herred (historic name)
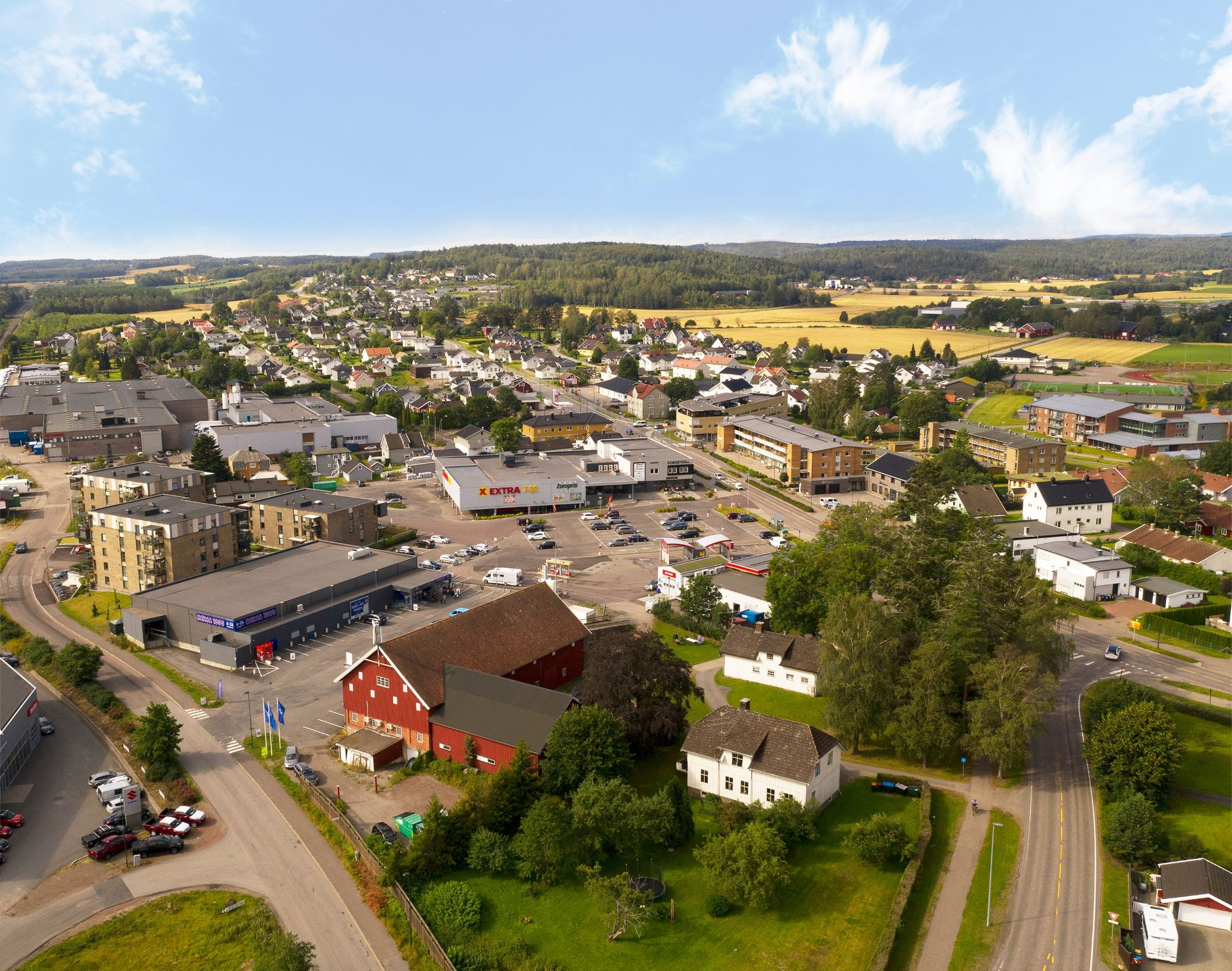
- View of Semsbyen

- Vestfold within Norway

- Sem within Vestfold
- Coordinates: 59°16′56″N 10°19′48″E
- Country: Norway
- County: Vestfold
- District: Jarlsberg
- Established: 1 Jan 1838
  - Created as: Formannskapsdistrikt
- Disestablished: 1 Jan 1988
  - Succeeded by: Tønsberg Municipality
- Administrative centre: Semsbyen

Government
  - Mayor (1975–1988): Jacob Kirsebom (H)

Area (upon dissolution)
  - Total: 102.3 km^{2} (39.5 sq mi)
  - Rank: #387 in Norway
- Highest elevation (Undrumsåsen): 145 m (476 ft)

Population (1987)
  - Total: 21,948
  - Rank: #29 in Norway
  - Density: 214.5/km^{2} (556/sq mi)
  - Change (10 years): ▲ +4.7%
- Demonym: Semsokning

Official language
  - Norwegian form: Bokmål
- Time zone: UTC+01:00 (CET)
  - Summer (DST): UTC+02:00 (CEST)
- ISO 3166 code: NO-0721

Sem (Norwegian pronunciation: [ˈsɛm]; locally [ˈsæm]) is a former municipality in Vestfold county, Norway. The 102.3-square-kilometre (39.5 sq mi) municipality existed from 1838 until its dissolution in 1988. The area is now part of Tønsberg Municipality in the traditional district of Jarlsberg. The administrative centre was the village of Semsbyen. Other villages in Sem Municipality included Barkåker, Eik, Husvik, Husøy, Ringshaug, and Tolvsrød.

Prior to its dissolution in 1988, the 102.3-square-kilometre (39.5 sq mi) municipality was the 387th largest by area out of the 454 municipalities in Norway. Sem Municipality was the 29th most populous municipality in Norway with a population of about 21,948. The municipality's population density was 214.5 inhabitants per square kilometre (556/sq mi) and its population had increased by 4.7% over the previous 10-year period.

== General information ==
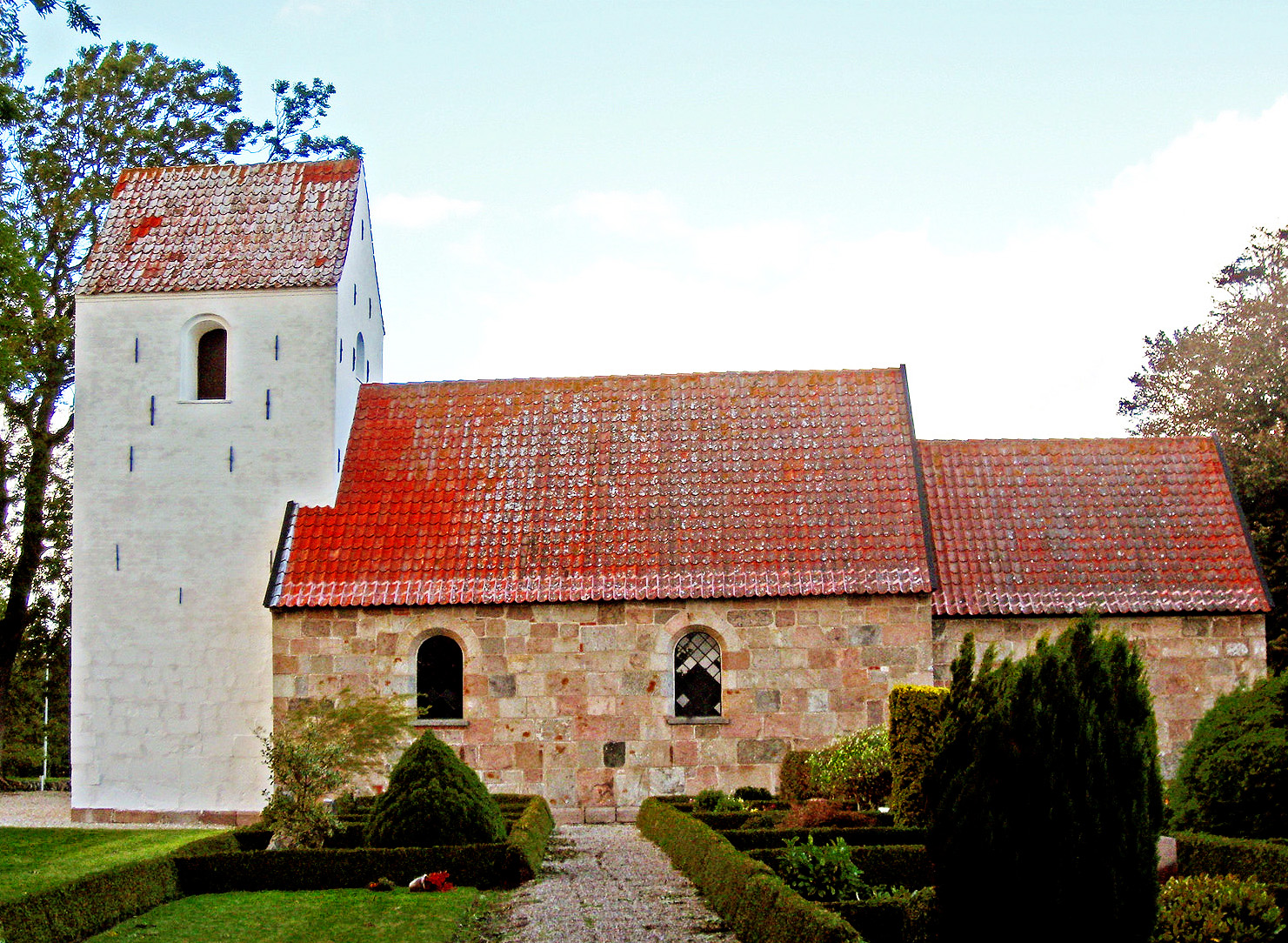
View of the local Sem Church

=== Administrative history ===
The formannskapsdistrikt law of 1837 created a system of local government in Norway by establishing each town (ladested or kjøpstad) and each Church of Norway prestegjeld as a civil municipality. On 1 January 1838, Sem prestegjeld was established as Sem Municipality. On 1 January 1877, a small area of Sem Municipality (population: 61) was transferred into Tønsberg Municipality. On 1 July 1915, an area of Nøtterøy Municipality (population: 12) was transferred to Sem Municipality.

During the 1960s, there were many municipal mergers across Norway due to the work of the Schei Committee. On 1 January 1965, the Stang area of northeastern Sem Municipality (population: 126) was transferred to the neighboring Borre Municipality. On 1 January 1967, a minor boundary adjustment was made: an area of Stokke Municipality (population: 5) was transferred to Sem Municipality and a nearby area of Sem Municipality (population: 2) was transferred to Stokke Municipality.

On 1 January 1988, Sem Municipality (population: 21,948) was dissolved and merged with Tønsberg Municipality (population: 8,896) to form an enlarged Tønsberg Municipality.

=== Name ===
The municipality is named after the old Sem prestegjeld. The prestegjeld was named after the old Sem farm (Old Norse: Sæmr, a compressed form of Sæheimr) since the first Sem Church was built there. The first element is sær which means "sea" or "ocean", likely referring to the local Tønsbergfjorden. The last element is heimr which means "home" or "abode".

=== Churches ===
The Church of Norway had three parishes (sokn) within Sem Municipality. At the time of the municipal dissolution, the municipality was divided between the Sem prestegjeld and the Søndre Slagen prestegjeld which were both located within the Tønsberg domprosti (arch-deanery) in the Diocese of Tunsberg.

Churches in Sem Municipality
Prestegjeld	Parish (sokn)	Church name	Location of the church	Year built
Sem	Sem	Sem Church	Jarlsberg farm	c. 1100
Sem	Slagen	Slagen Church	Slagen, east of Eik	1901
Søndre Slagen	Søndre Slagen	Husøy Church	Husøy	1933
Søndre Slagen	Søndre Slagen	Søndre Slagen Church	Tønsberg	1972
Søndre Slagen	Søndre Slagen	Vallø Church	Vallø	1782

== Geography ==
The highest point in the municipality was the 145-metre (476 ft) tall mountain Undrumsåsen. The municipality almost completely encircled the city of Tønsberg. Borre Municipality was located to the north, Åsgårdstrand Municipality was located to the northeast, the Oslofjorden was located to the east, Tønsberg Municipality and Nøtterøy Municipality were located to the south, Stokke Municipality was located to the southwest, Ramnes Municipality was located to the west, and Våle Municipality was located to the northwest.

== History ==
Originally, the old Sem prestegjeld was named after the historic Sem Manor (Sem hovedgård). During the Middle Ages, Sem Manor was the residence of a royal and feudal overlord at the site where Jarlsberg Manor is located today. King Harald Fairhair chose to install his son Bjorn Farmann as the master of the estate. It was here that Bjorn Farmann was killed by Eric Bloodaxe in 927. In 1673, Peder Schumacher Griffenfeld took over the property which until then had belonged to the King of Denmark. Griffenfeldt named the farm Griffenfeldgård, but three years later it was renamed Jarlsberg Manor (Jarlsberg Hovedgård). In 1682, the buildings on Jarlsberg burned and new buildings of stone were built by the new owner, the Danish-Norwegian Field Marshal Wilhelm Gustav Wedel.

== Government ==
While it existed, Sem Municipality was responsible for primary education (through 10th grade), outpatient health services, senior citizen services, welfare and other social services, zoning, economic development, and municipal roads and utilities. The municipality was governed by a municipal council of directly elected representatives. The mayor was indirectly elected by a vote of the municipal council. The municipality was under the jurisdiction of the Tønsberg District Court and the Agder Court of Appeal.

=== Municipal council ===
The municipal council (Kommunestyre) of Sem Municipality was made up of 41 representatives that were elected to four-year terms. The tables below show the historical composition of the council by political party.

Sem kommunestyre 1983–1987
Party name (in Norwegian)	Number of representatives
Labour Party (Arbeiderpartiet)	13
Progress Party (Fremskrittspartiet)	4
Conservative Party (Høyre)	18
Christian Democratic Party (Kristelig Folkeparti)	3
Centre Party (Senterpartiet)	1
Socialist Left Party (Sosialistisk Venstreparti)	1
Liberal Party (Venstre)	1
Total number of members:	41
Note: On 1 January 1988, Sem Municipality became part of Tønsberg Municipality.

Sem kommunestyre 1979–1983
Party name (in Norwegian)	Number of representatives
Labour Party (Arbeiderpartiet)	13
Progress Party (Fremskrittspartiet)	1
Conservative Party (Høyre)	19
Christian Democratic Party (Kristelig Folkeparti)	4
Centre Party (Senterpartiet)	2
Socialist Left Party (Sosialistisk Venstreparti)	1
Liberal Party (Venstre)	1
Total number of members:	41

Sem kommunestyre 1975–1979
Party name (in Norwegian)	Number of representatives
Labour Party (Arbeiderpartiet)	14
Anders Lange's Party (Anders Langes parti)	1
Conservative Party (Høyre)	15
Christian Democratic Party (Kristelig Folkeparti)	5
New People's Party (Nye Folkepartiet)	1
Centre Party (Senterpartiet)	3
Socialist Left Party (Sosialistisk Venstreparti)	1
Liberal Party (Venstre)	1
Total number of members:	41

Sem kommunestyre 1971–1975
Party name (in Norwegian)	Number of representatives
Labour Party (Arbeiderpartiet)	17
Conservative Party (Høyre)	14
Christian Democratic Party (Kristelig Folkeparti)	3
Centre Party (Senterpartiet)	3
Socialist People's Party (Sosialistisk Folkeparti)	2
Liberal Party (Venstre)	2
Total number of members:	41

Sem kommunestyre 1967–1971
Party name (in Norwegian)	Number of representatives
Labour Party (Arbeiderpartiet)	18
Conservative Party (Høyre)	15
Christian Democratic Party (Kristelig Folkeparti)	2
Centre Party (Senterpartiet)	2
Socialist People's Party (Sosialistisk Folkeparti)	2
Liberal Party (Venstre)	2
Total number of members:	41

Sem kommunestyre 1963–1967
Party name (in Norwegian)	Number of representatives
Labour Party (Arbeiderpartiet)	19
Conservative Party (Høyre)	15
Christian Democratic Party (Kristelig Folkeparti)	2
Centre Party (Senterpartiet)	2
Socialist People's Party (Sosialistisk Folkeparti)	1
Liberal Party (Venstre)	2
Total number of members:	41

Sem herredsstyre 1959–1963
Party name (in Norwegian)	Number of representatives
Labour Party (Arbeiderpartiet)	20
Conservative Party (Høyre)	15
Christian Democratic Party (Kristelig Folkeparti)	3
Centre Party (Senterpartiet)	2
Liberal Party (Venstre)	1
Total number of members:	41

Sem herredsstyre 1955–1959
Party name (in Norwegian)	Number of representatives
Labour Party (Arbeiderpartiet)	18
Conservative Party (Høyre)	17
Christian Democratic Party (Kristelig Folkeparti)	3
Farmers' Party (Bondepartiet)	2
Liberal Party (Venstre)	1
Total number of members:	41

Sem herredsstyre 1951–1955
Party name (in Norwegian)	Number of representatives
Labour Party (Arbeiderpartiet)	13
Conservative Party (Høyre)	13
Christian Democratic Party (Kristelig Folkeparti)	3
Farmers' Party (Bondepartiet)	2
Liberal Party (Venstre)	1
Total number of members:	32

Sem herredsstyre 1947–1951
Party name (in Norwegian)	Number of representatives
Labour Party (Arbeiderpartiet)	11
Communist Party (Kommunistiske Parti)	1
Christian Democratic Party (Kristelig Folkeparti)	3
Joint List(s) of Non-Socialist Parties (Borgerlige Felleslister)	17
Total number of members:	32

Sem herredsstyre 1945–1947
Party name (in Norwegian)	Number of representatives
Labour Party (Arbeiderpartiet)	13
Communist Party (Kommunistiske Parti)	1
Christian Democratic Party (Kristelig Folkeparti)	4
Joint List(s) of Non-Socialist Parties (Borgerlige Felleslister)	14
Total number of members:	32

Sem herredsstyre 1937–1941*
Party name (in Norwegian)	Number of representatives
Labour Party (Arbeiderpartiet)	10
Conservative Party (Høyre)	20
Farmers' Party (Bondepartiet)	2
Total number of members:	32
Note: Due to the German occupation of Norway during World War II, no elections were held for new municipal councils until after the war ended in 1945.

=== Mayors ===
The mayor (Norwegian: ordfører) of Sem Municipality was the political leader of the municipality and the chairperson of the municipal council. The following people have held this position:

- 1838–1840: H.P. Holmboe
- 1840–1843: Peter Sverdrup
- 1843–1844: Jens Mørch
- 1844–1850: Jacob Jacobsen
- 1850–1852: Ole Helgesen Sande
- 1852–1854: Mathias Askehaug
- 1854–1858: O. von Munthe af Morgenstierne
- 1858–1860: Hans Olsen Røraas
- 1862–1866: H.C.P. Bakkeskaug
- 1866–1868: Carl Askeløf
- 1868–1870: J.L. Thams
- 1870–1874: P.A.O. Røsland
- 1876–1888: Nils Christian Larsen Ullenrød
- 1888–1899: H.C. Horgen
- 1899–1908: Kr. Løken
- 1908–1910: J. Haagenrud
- 1910–1911: A. Holth
- 1911–1914: Kr. Løken
- 1910–1911: A. Holth
- 1914–1917: Tank Frydenberg
- 1917–1920: Ole Olsen Nauen (H)
- 1920–1923: A. Monrad Rom
- 1923–1931: Chr. Auli
- 1932–1935: Th. Bostrøm Hansen
- 1935–1939: E. O. Bjønness
- 1938–1940: Nils Røraas
- 1945–1945: Harald Norheim
- 1946–1948: Morten Ilebrekke (H)
- 1948–1951: O. Olsen Nauen (H)
- 1952–1955: Asbjørn Døvle (H)
- 1956–1967: Alf Berg (Ap)
- 1967–1975: Gert Bjerløv (KrF)
- 1975–1988: Jacob Kirsebom (H)

== See also ==
- List of former municipalities of Norway
