= Harald Ulrik Sverdrup (engineer) =

Norwegian engineer (1846–1916)

- Born: 1846; Sem, Norway
- Died: 1916 (aged 69)
- Occupation: Engineer
- Children: Trygve Sverdrup
- Relatives: Jacob Liv Borch Sverdrup (grandfather)

Harald Ulrik Sverdrup (16 or 17 December 1846 – 1 April 1916) was a Norwegian engineer.

== Personal life ==
Sverdrup was born at the farm Rise in Sem as a son of Peter Jacob Sverdrup and Aaselle Thurmann. He was a grandson of former owner of Rise farm Jacob Liv Borch Sverdrup, grandnephew of professor Georg Sverdrup, nephew of politician Harald Ulrik Sverdrup and Prime Minister Johan Sverdrup, first cousin once removed of professors Jakob Sverdrup and Georg Sverdrup, and a first cousin of bishop Jakob Sverdrup, professor Edvard Sverdrup, bishop Jakob Sverdrup Smitt, politician Livius Smitt and agriculturalist Jonas Smitt. He was the father of naval officer and politician Trygve Sverdrup.

== Career ==
Sverdrup got his first education at the agricultural school run at his family farm until 1861. From 1867 to 1869 he attended the Norwegian College of Agriculture at Aas. In 1874 a position engineer of agriculture became vacant, left behind by Jonas Smitt—his first cousin. Sverdrup was given the position, provided that he conducted a year of studies to be prepared. He spent the time from October 1874 to October 1875 in Sweden and Denmark. As engineer of agriculture from 1875, he was responsible for agriculture in the Diocese of Kristiania and the Diocese of Hamar. From 1913 this was changed to Akershus Amt, Hedemarkens Amt and Kristians Amt. He was also a member of the board of the Royal Norwegian Society for Development from 1893. He retired as engineer in June 1915, and died in April 1916 in Kristiania.
