= Jacob Sverdrup Smitt =

Norwegian politician

- Bishop
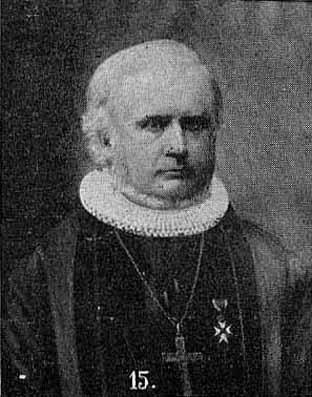
- Church: Church of Norway
- Diocese: Diocese of Tromsø (1876–1885); Diocese of Kristiansand (1885–1889)
- Other posts: MP, 1874-1882; President of the Lagting

Personal details
- Born: 6 January 1835 Land, Norway
- Died: 6 June 1889 (aged 54) Holla, Norway
- Denomination: Christian
- Parents: Anton Elias Smitt; Livia Sverdrup
- Spouse: Letta Nicolaysen
- Occupation: Priest
- Education: Cand.theol. (1860)
- Alma mater: Royal Frederick University

Jacob Sverdrup Smitt (6 January 1835 – 6 June 1889) was a Norwegian bishop and politician.

== Career ==
Smitt was born in Land (present-day Nordre Land Municipality), Norway. He was the son of the dean Anton Elias Smitt (1805–1875) and Livia Sverdrup (1808–1840), and brother of Jonas and Livius Smitt. His father was a curate in Land from 1835 until 1840, when he became vicar in Vinje Church. Jakob Sverdrup Smitt was home schooled, except for one year of school in Kristiania from 1852 to 1853. He took his examen artium in 1853, enrolled in theology studies and graduated with a Candidatus theologiæ degree in 1860.

In June 1862 Smitt became a curate, working under his father in Voss Church. In April 1865 in Bergen he married Letta Nicolaysen (1843–1923). In January 1865 he moved to Hammerfest to become a catechist and school teacher. He was promoted to vicar in July 1867, then dean in November 1870. In 1876 he succeeded Fredrik Waldemar Hvoslef as bishop in the Diocese of Tromsø. He first showed some willingness to adapt to the "religious peculiarity" of "certain congregations" in the high north, and tolerated Laestadianism. However, he came to follow the official assimilation policy of the state, especially pertaining to language and culture of the Sami and Kven people.

Smitt was a member of the city council of Hammerfest Municipality from 1867 to 1876. In 1874 he was elected to the Parliament of Norway, representing the constituency of Tromsø, Hammerfest, Vadsø og Vardø. He was re-elected in 1877 and 1880. For his last term he served as President of the Lagting. However, in the ensuing struggle between liberal and conservative politicians, where the liberals tried to gain control of the Lagting and henceforth the High Court of the Realm, Smitt was perceived as not radical enough. He believed that the King (the executive branch of government) should have an absolute veto in constitutional cases. He was "swept" out of politics, notes the Norsk biografisk leksikon.

In 1885 Smitt applied for the post as Bishop of the Diocese of Kristiansand. He was appointed in June 1885, by Minister of Education and Church Affairs Elias Blix. Only two months later, Blix was replaced by Jakob Sverdrup in a highly controversial move. Jacob Smitt Sverdrup was a first cousin of Jakob Sverdrup—and Harald Ulrik Sverdrup, Jr, Georg Sverdrup and Edvard Sverdrup, as well as a maternal grandson of Jacob Liv Borch Sverdrup and nephew of Prime Minister Johan Sverdrup, who conducted the replacement of Elias Blix.

He was also an uncle of Anton Elias Smitt, Jr. through his half-brother. He died in June 1889 in Holla Municipality in Telemark.

Church of Norway titles
Preceded by Fredrik Waldemar Hvoslef	Bishop of Tromsø; 1876–1885	Succeeded by Johannes Nilssøn Skaar
Preceded by Jørgen Johan Tandberg	Bishop of Kristiansand; 1885–1889	Succeeded by Johan Christian Heuch
