= Harald Sverdrup =

Harald Sverdrup may refer to:

- Harald Sverdrup (oceanographer) (Harald Ulrik Sverdrup, 1888–1957), Norwegian oceanographer and meteorologist
- Harald Ulrik Sverdrup (engineer) (1846–1916), Norwegian engineer
- Harald Sverdrup (writer) (Harald Ulrik Sverdrup, 1923–1992), Norwegian poet and children's writer
- Harald Ulrik Sverdrup (politician) (1813–1891), Norwegian priest and politician
