= Anton Elias Smitt =

Norwegian forester

Anton Elias Smitt (7 May 1883 – 1970) was a Norwegian forester.

He was born in Bergen as a son of shipbuilder and works owner Georg Christian Smitt and Marie Cathrine Wolff. His father was a half-brother (different mother) of Jonas, Livius and Jakob Sverdrup Smitt. Smitt graduated from the Norwegian College of Agriculture in 1909. He worked as the county forester of Rogaland from 1914 to 1923, and at the research institution Vestlandets forstlige forsøksstasjon from 1923 to 1928. From 1 January 1928 to 31 December 1956 he served as its general director. As general director of the institute, Smitt was influential on the practice of large-scale forest planting in Western Norway, Central Norway and Northern Norway. He travelled extensively abroad, to study methods and ways to plant forest in the somewhat rough climate in these parts of Norway. Among others he found the North American species Picea sitchensis to be suitable for Norway, during a study trip in 1916 and 1917. The biographical dictionary Norsk biografisk leksikon referred to this forest planting as a "national task on the highest level".

Anton Elias Smitt died in 1970. Vestlandets forstlige forsøksstasjon became a part of Skogforsk through a 1972 merger, which in turn became the Norwegian Forest and Landscape Institute through a 2006 merger.
