= Sem, Norway =

Village in Tønsberg, Norway

Sem Semsbyen
- Village
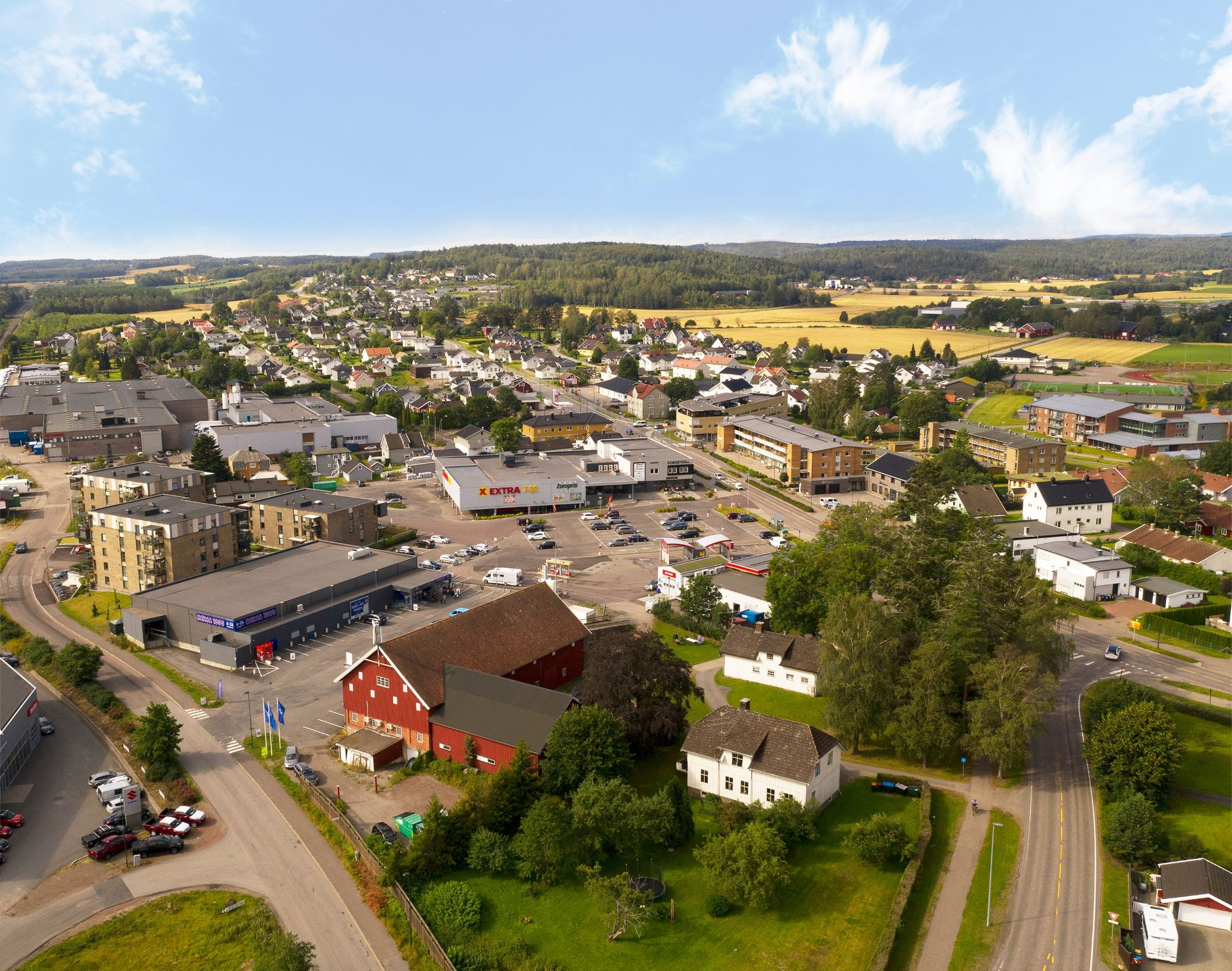
- View of the village
- Interactive map of Sem
- Coordinates: 59.2823°N 10.33004°E
- Country: Norway
- Region: Eastern Norway
- County: Vestfold
- District: Jarlsberg
- Municipality: Tønsberg Municipality

Area
  - Total: 2.17 km^{2} (0.84 sq mi)
- Elevation: 18 m (59 ft)

Population (2026)
  - Total: 2,776
  - Density: 1,279/km^{2} (3,310/sq mi)
- Time zone: UTC+01:00 (CET)
  - Summer (DST): UTC+02:00 (CEST)
- Post Code: 3170 Sem

Sem or Semsbyen is a village in Tønsberg Municipality in Vestfold county, Norway. The village is located about 5 kilometres (3.1 mi) to the west of the city of Tønsberg. The village of Vear lies about 3 kilometres (1.9 mi) to the southeast of Sem, along the shore of the Tønsbergfjorden. The historic Sem Church is located just northeast of the village.

The village lies along the border with Sandefjord Municipality to the southwest (in fact, a small portion of the urban area of Sem crosses over the border and has about 50 residents in the neighboring municipality). The 2.17-square-kilometre (540-acre) village has a population (2026) of 2,776 and a population density of 1,279 inhabitants per square kilometre (3,310/sq mi).

== History ==
The historic Sem Manor (Sem hovedgård) is located just outside the present-day village. During the Middle Ages, Sem Manor was the residence of a royal and feudal overlord at the site where Jarlsberg Manor is located today. King Harald Fairhair chose to install his son Bjorn Farmann as the master of the estate. It was here that Bjorn Farmann was killed by Eric Bloodaxe in 927. In 1673, Peder Schumacher Griffenfeld took over the property which until then had belonged to the King of Denmark. Griffenfeldt named the farm Griffenfeldgård, but three years later it was renamed Jarlsberg Manor (Jarlsberg Hovedgård). In 1682, the buildings on Jarlsberg burned and new buildings of stone were built by the new owner, the Danish-Norwegian Field Marshal Wilhelm Gustav Wedel.

The village of Sem was the administrative centre of the old Sem Municipality which existed from 1838 until 1988 when it became part of Tønsberg Municipality.

=== Name ===
The village (and the old Sem prestegjeld) is named after the old Sem farm (Old Norse: Sæmr, a compressed form of Sæheimr) since the first Sem Church was built there. The first element is sær which means "sea" or "ocean", likely referring to the local Tønsbergfjorden. The last element is heimr which means "home" or "abode".

== Media gallery ==
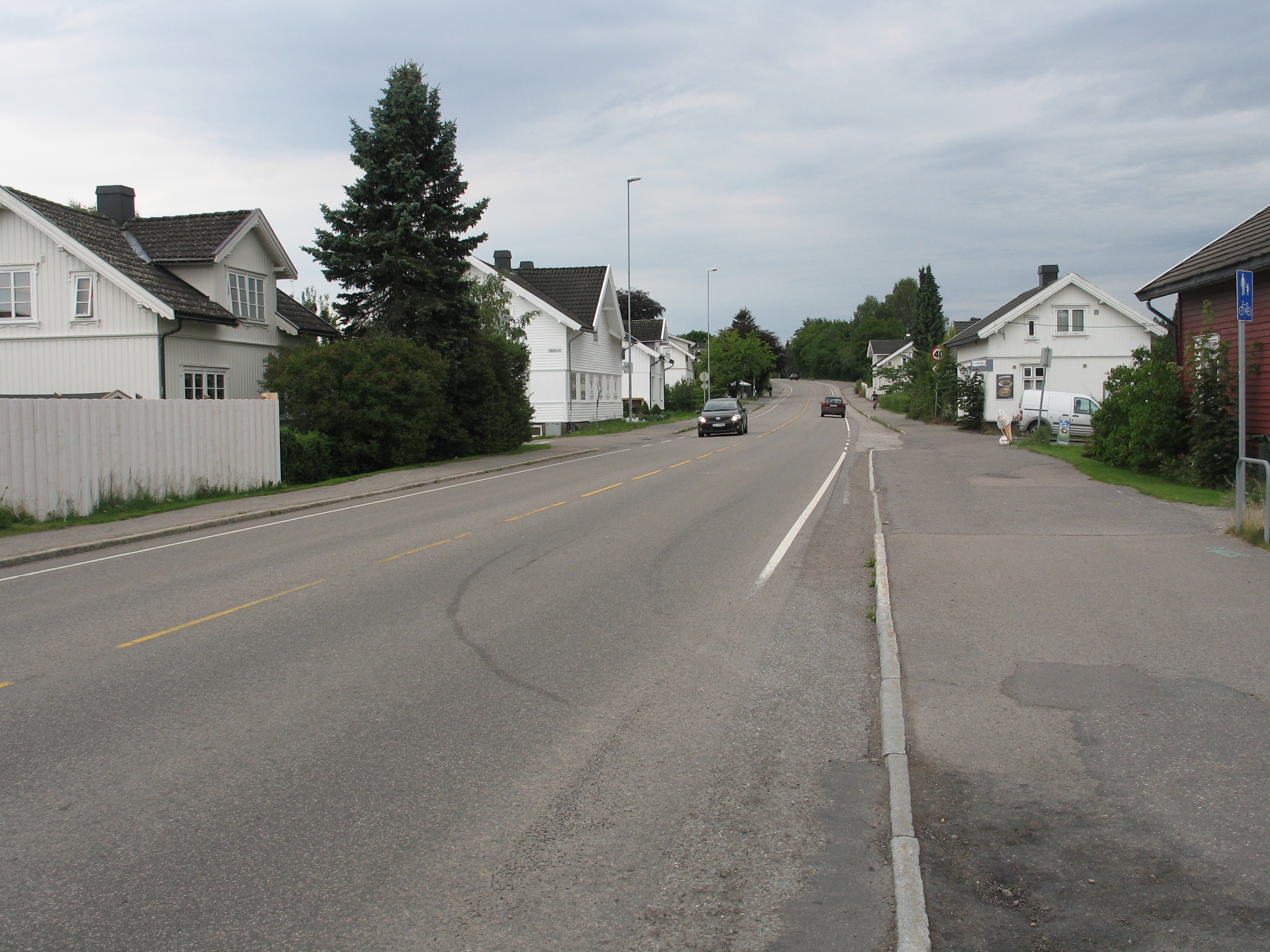

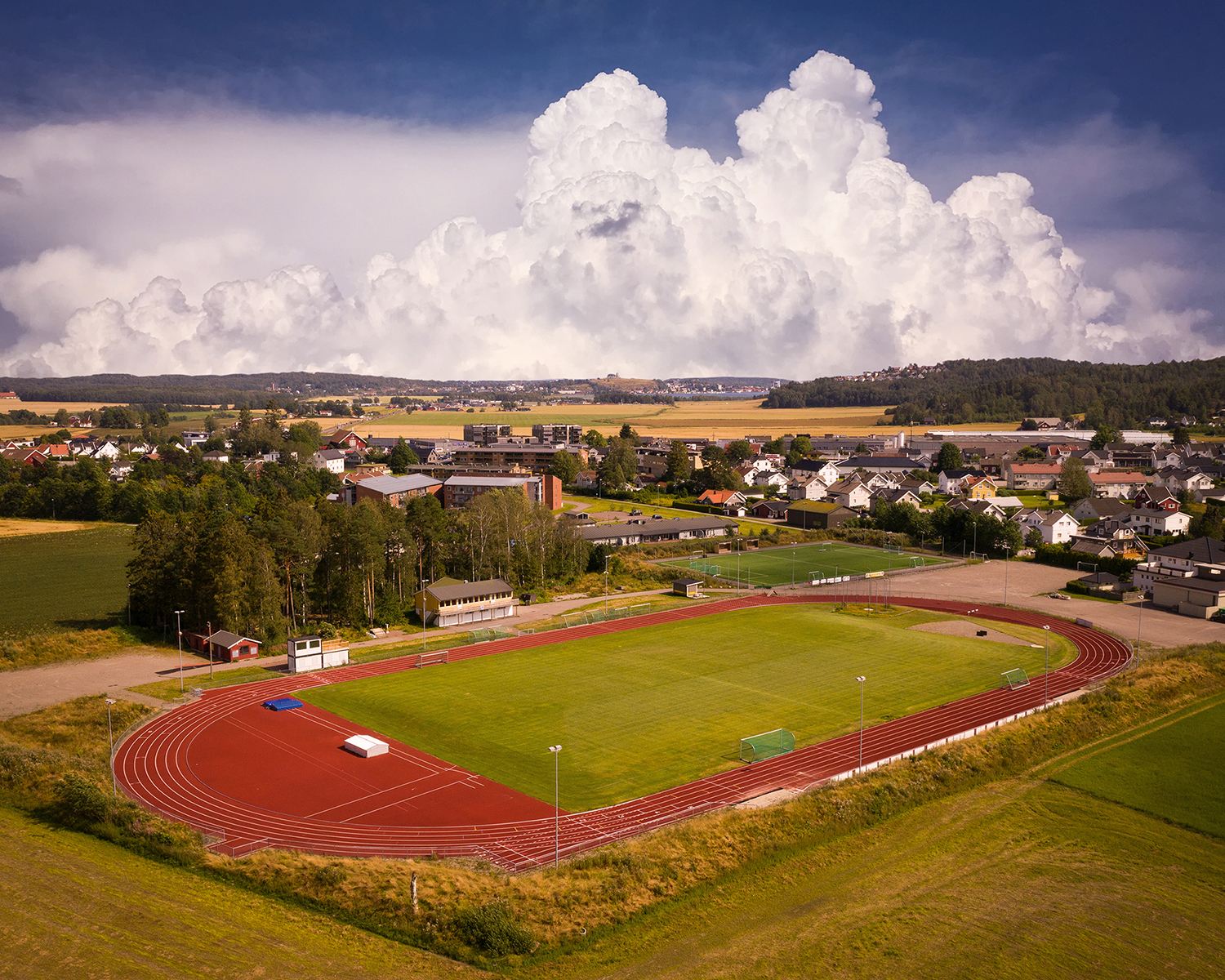

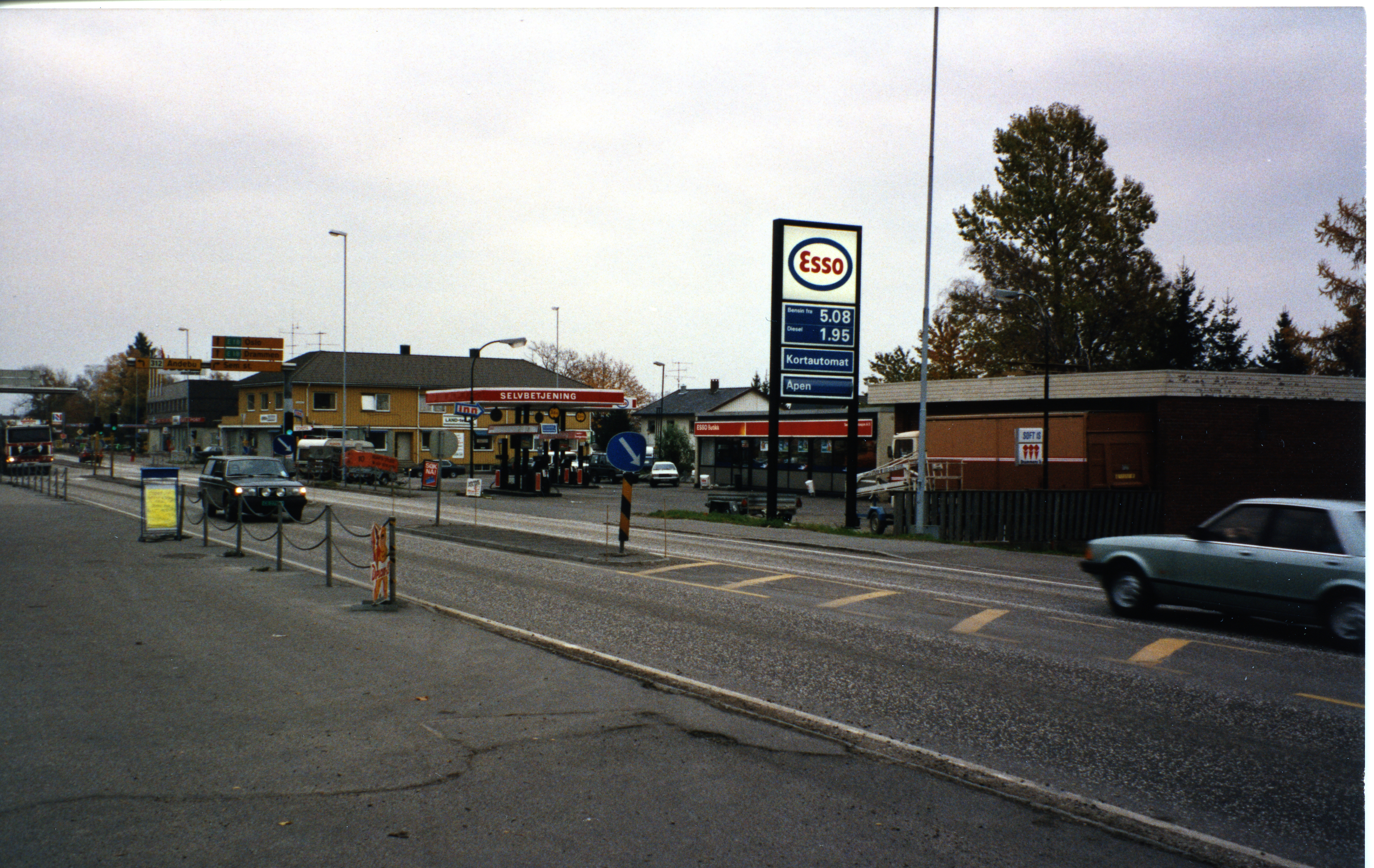

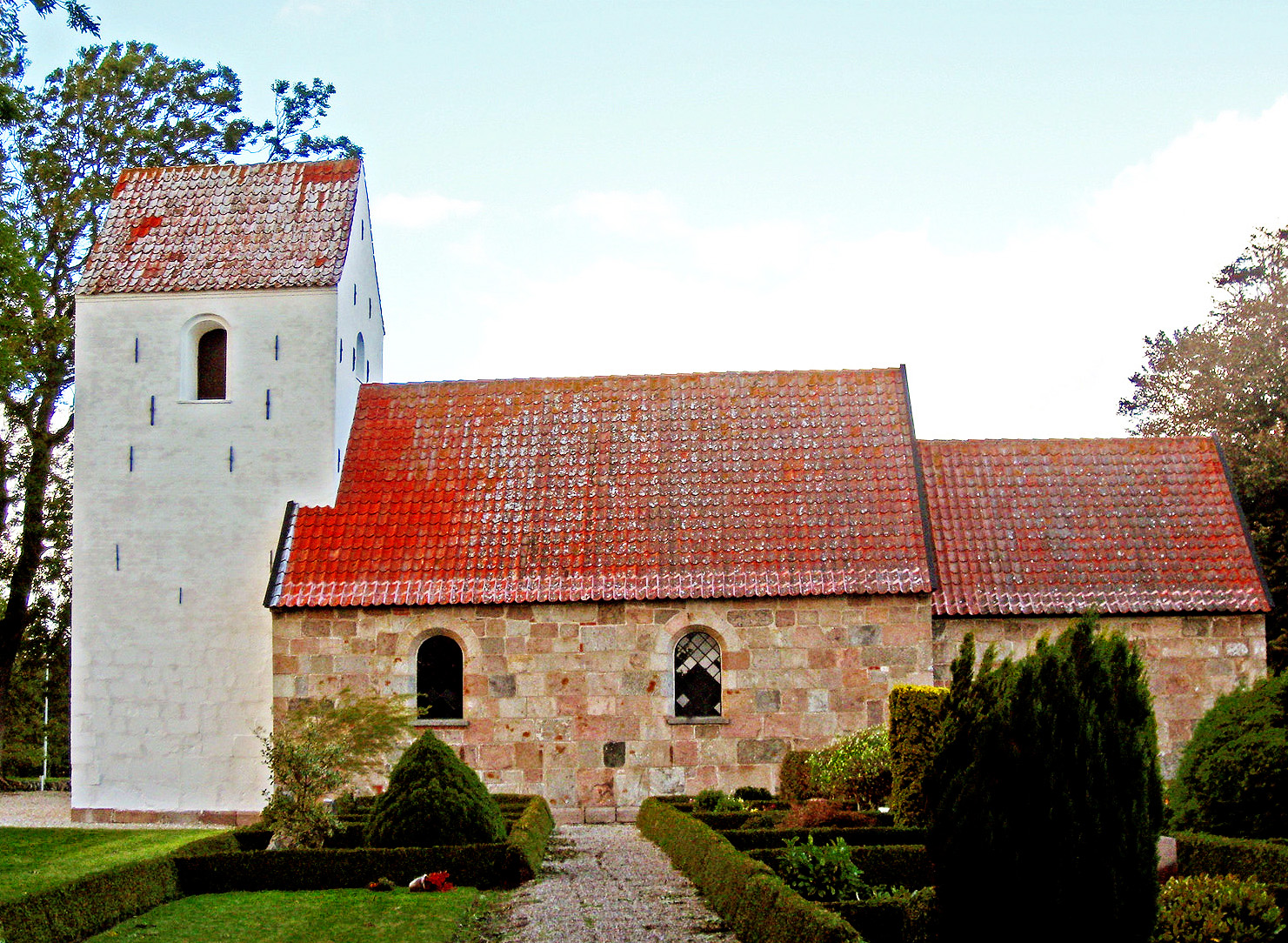

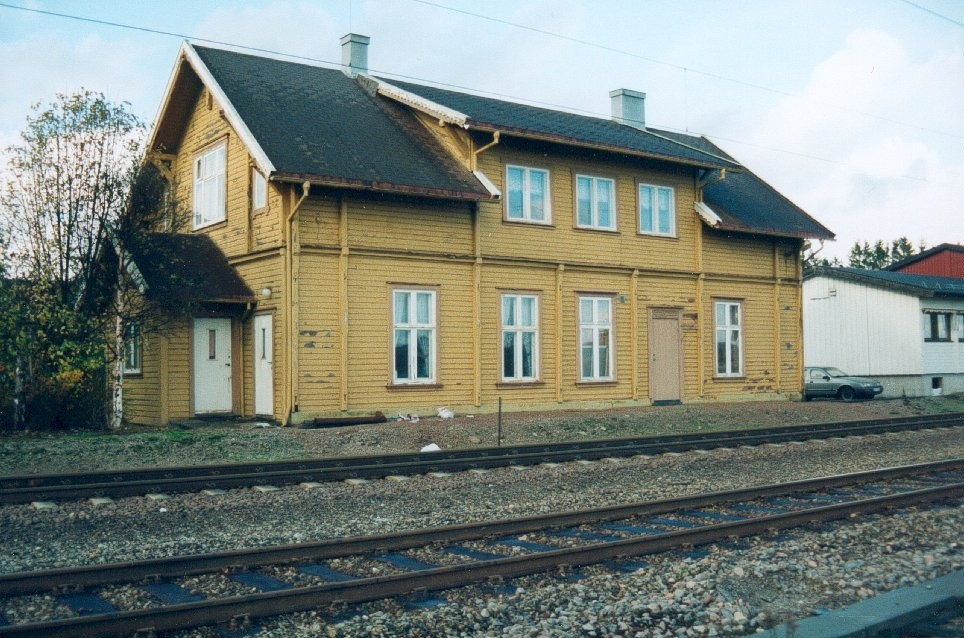

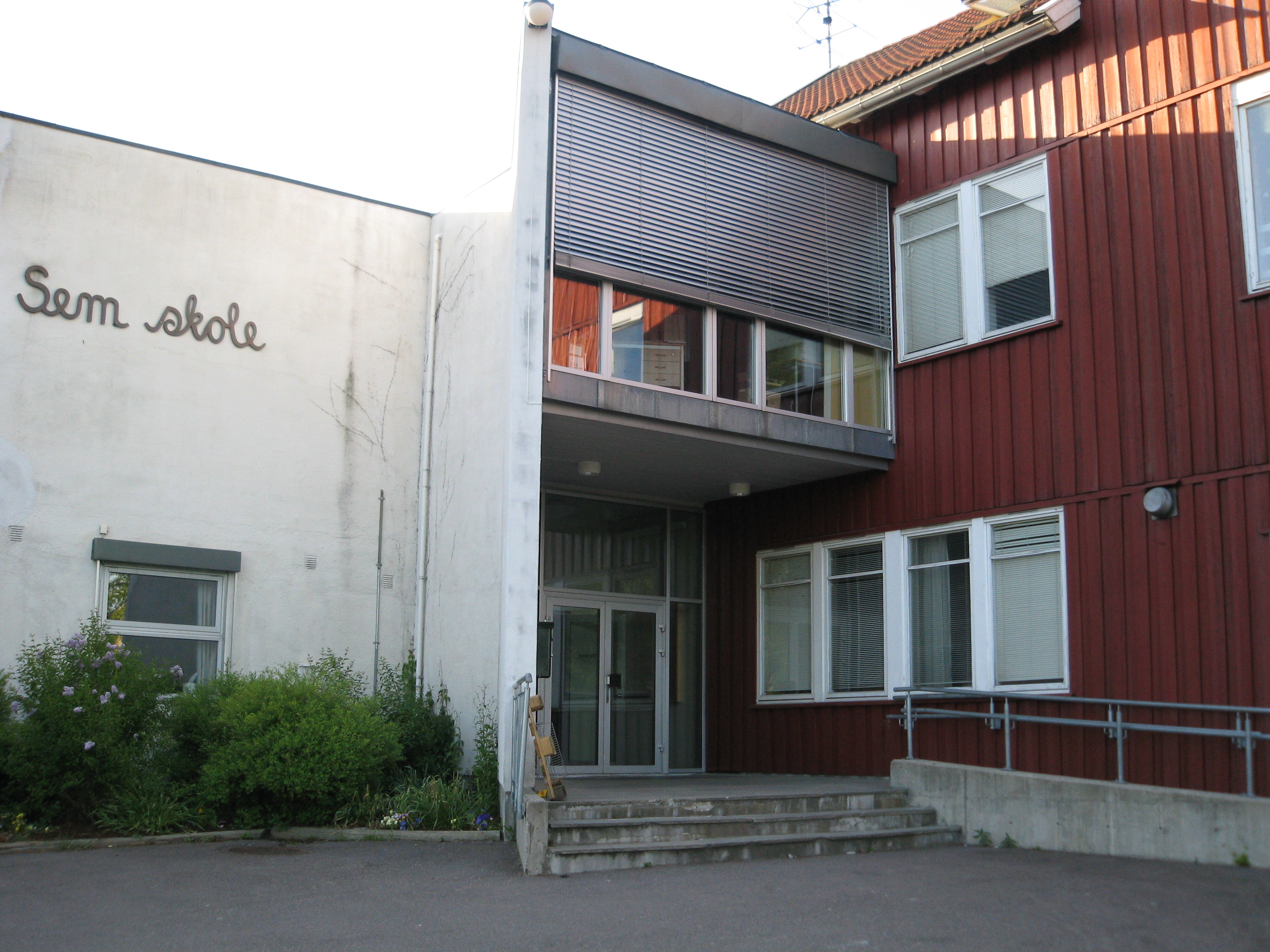
