= Korni – Vestfold Flatbrødfabrikk =

Former Norwegian flatbread factory

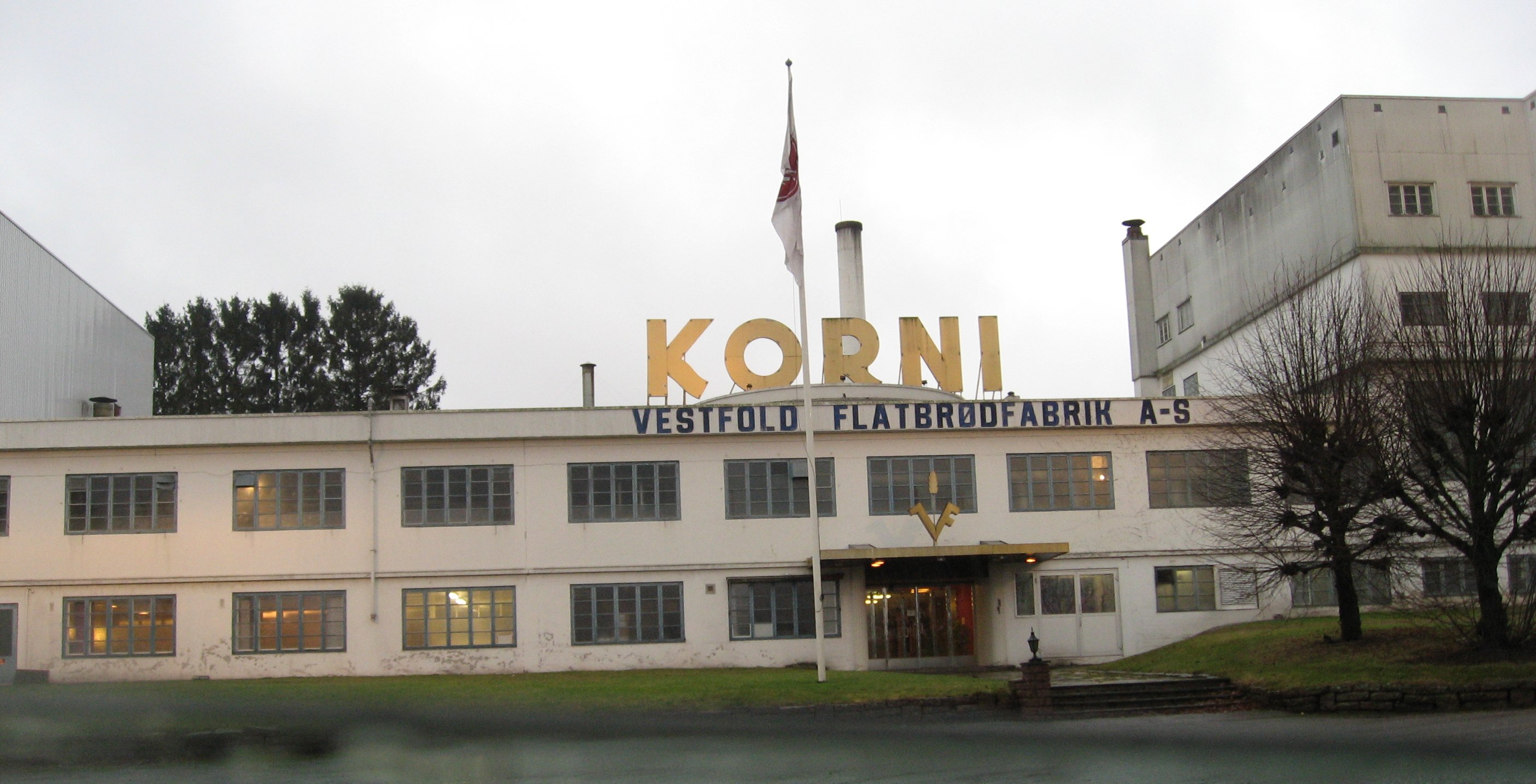
- Formerly: Vestfold Flatbrødfabrikk
- Company type: Aksjeselskap
- Industry: Food
- Founded: 1919
- Founder: Nils Halvorsen
- Defunct: 2013
- Fate: Production moved to Germany
- Headquarters: Barkåker, Vestfold, Norway
- Key people: Nils Halvorsen; Harald and Olaf Norheim
- Products: Flatbread, crispbread
- Owner: Kavli (from 1984)

Korni – Vestfold Flatbrødfabrikk was a Norwegian flatbread factory at Barkåker in Vestfold, founded in 1919 by Nils Halvorsen. Its main product, the Korni flatbread, became a well-known national brand, and the factory's large yellow KORNI roof sign was a landmark along the E18 near Tønsberg.

The company was originally named Vestfold Flatbrødfabrikk and took the name Korni in 1948. The Bergen firm O. Kavli took over ownership in 1984. After several years of losses, Kavli announced the closure in September 2012, and production at Barkåker ended in 2013, after which Korni flatbread was made in Germany.
