= Sem Church =

Church in Vestfold, Norway

- Sem kirke
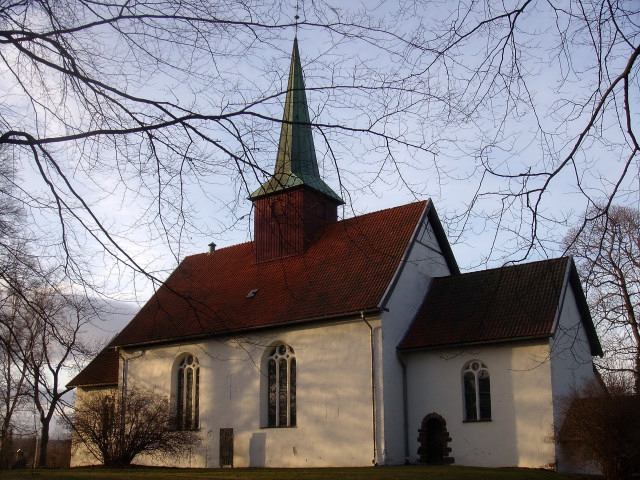
- View of the church
- Sem Church
- 59°17′30″N 10°23′11″E
- Location: Tønsberg Municipality, Vestfold
- Country: Norway
- Denomination: Church of Norway
- Previous denomination: Catholic Church
- Churchmanship: Evangelical Lutheran

History
- Status: Parish church
- Founded: 11th century
- Consecrated: c. 1100

Architecture
- Functional status: Active
- Architectural type: Long church
- Completed: c. 1100 (926 years ago)

Specifications
- Capacity: 211
- Materials: Stone

Administration
- Diocese: Tunsberg
- Deanery: Tønsberg domprosti
- Parish: Sem
- Norwegian Cultural Heritage Site
- Type: Church
- Status: Automatically protected
- ID: 85421

Sem Church (Norwegian: Sem kirke) is a parish church of the Church of Norway in Tønsberg Municipality in Vestfold county, Norway. It is located in the village of Sem. It is one of the churches for the Sem parish which is part of the Tønsberg domprosti (deanery) in the Diocese of Tunsberg. The white, stone church was built in a long church design around the year 1100 using plans drawn up by an unknown architect. The church seats about 211 people.

== History ==
The earliest existing historical records of the church date back to the early 1000s when the Borgarting's Law was written, but the exact year of the church's founding is unknown. The first church in Sem was a wooden post church. The church is located on the old Sem Manor, which later became known as the Jarlsberg Manor since the County of Jarlsberg was based there. The church was one of the prominent "county churches" in Vestfold during the early Christian period in Norway.

Just after the year 1100, the old wooden church was torn down and replaced with the present Romanesque stone building. The church was dedicated to Saint Olav and was consecrated on 18 July, but the year of the consecration is not known. The church originally consisted of just a nave and a chancel (the chancel was built a short time before the nave). The nave originally had round-arched portals on the west end (later removed when the church was enlarged), on the south wall (surrounded by two windows), and in the chancel to the south. The chancel portal is quite special, surrounded as it is by reliefs of signs from the zodiac as a sort of calendar as well as a scene from Aesop's Fables.

A well-known incident in 1129 from the Magnussønnenes saga (chapter 26 of the Heimskringla) is said to have taken place here, where Harald Gille walked over a red-hot plow iron (a trial by fire) accompanied by two bishops to prove that he was the son of Magnus Berrføtt (and thus the brother of Sigurd Jorsalfare). The historian Peter Andreas Munch also believed that it was in Sem church that the Bagler king Erling Steinvegg participated in a trial by fire for his royal right in 1204.

In the 1670s, the church came into the ownership of the Count of Jarlsberg, and there was a major rebuilding from 1690 to 1693 (as evidenced by a preserved memorial plaque). During this project, a vestry was built off the south wall of the choir and a brick church porch was built on the west end of the nave.

In 1814, this church served as an election church (Norwegian: valgkirke). Together with more than 300 other parish churches across Norway, it was a polling station for elections to the 1814 Norwegian Constituent Assembly which wrote the Constitution of Norway. This was Norway's first national elections. Each church parish was a constituency that elected people called "electors" who later met together in each county to elect the representatives for the assembly that was to meet in Eidsvoll later that year.

In 1834, the vestry was torn down and removed and the portal on the south side of the choir was bricked up and covered over. On the east end of the chancel, a special burial chapel for the Wedel family was built. In 1899, the ownership of the church was transferred to the parish. In 1902, two new vestries were built on either side of the choir and the Wedel burial chapel was enlarged as well. In 1902, the south portal of the choir and the decorative reliefs were rediscovered in the wall and they were reopened. There were significant restorations in 1924–25 (by Carl Berner) and 1955–56 (by Finn Bryn). In 1925, the north vestry was replaced with a wooden addition. The church has its present appearance after a renovation leading up to the jubilee celebrations in 1999, where previously improperly treated plaster was removed and the church received new plaster from scratch. The church was closed for restoration from January to May 2012.

== Media gallery ==
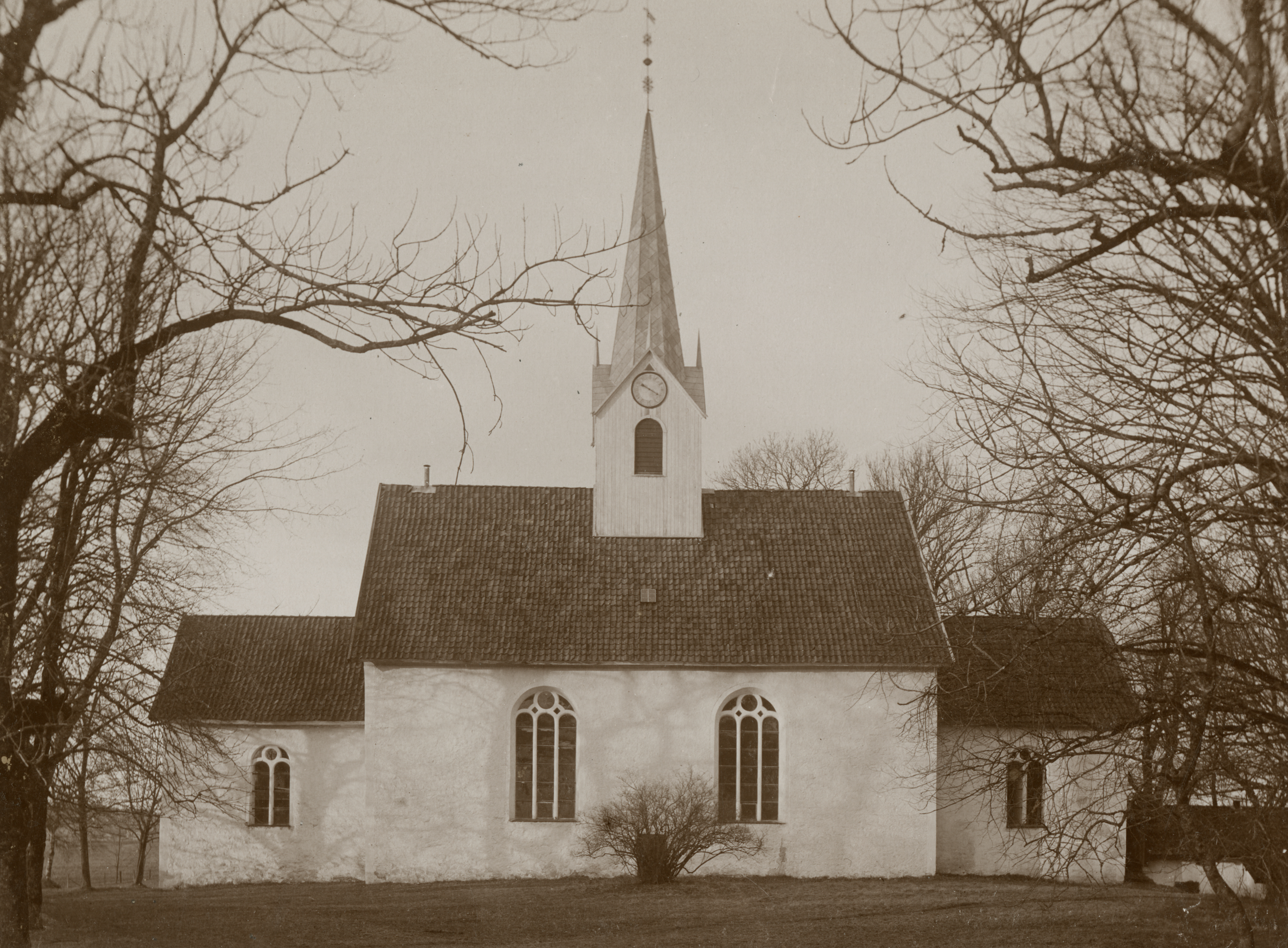

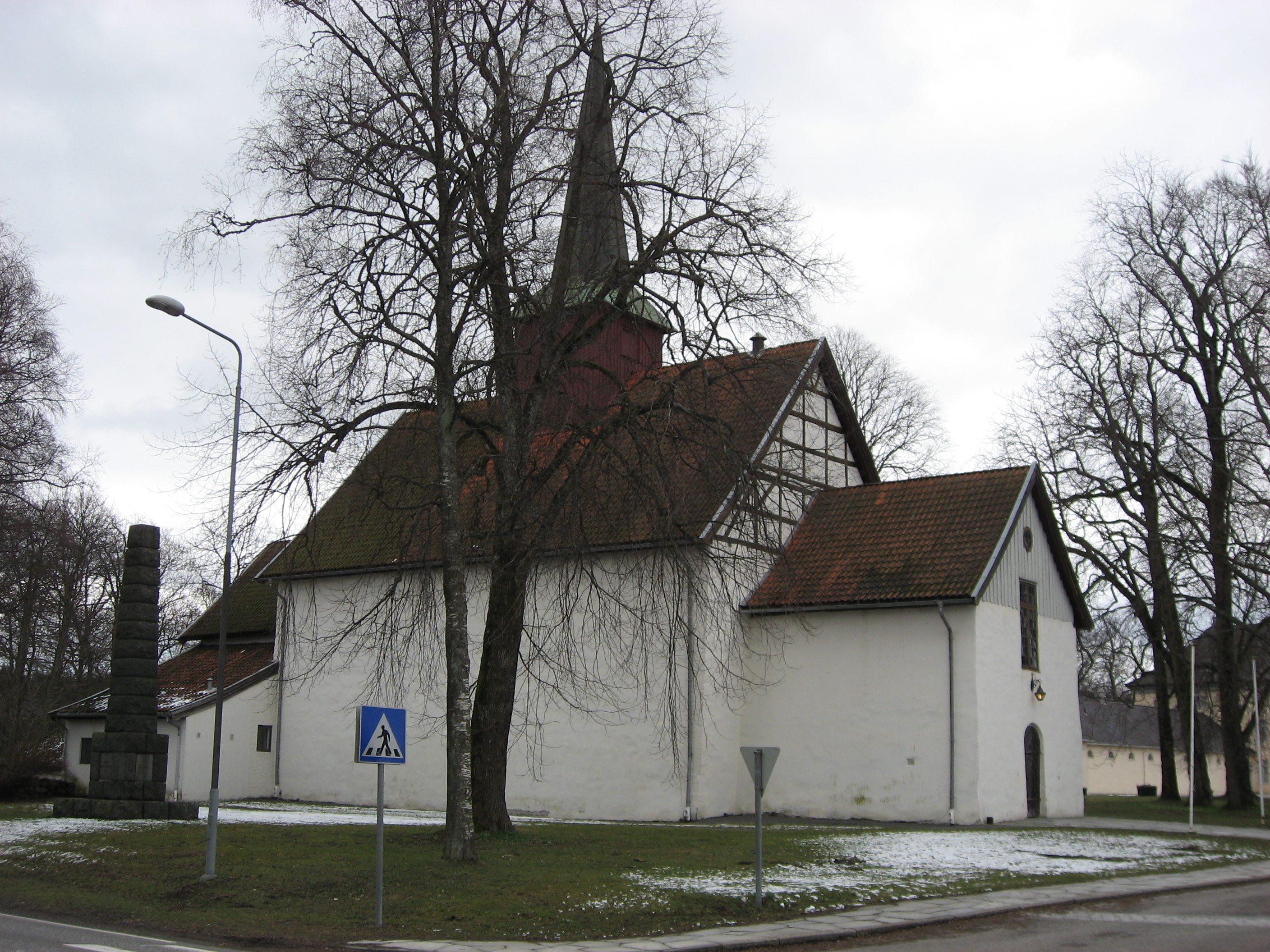

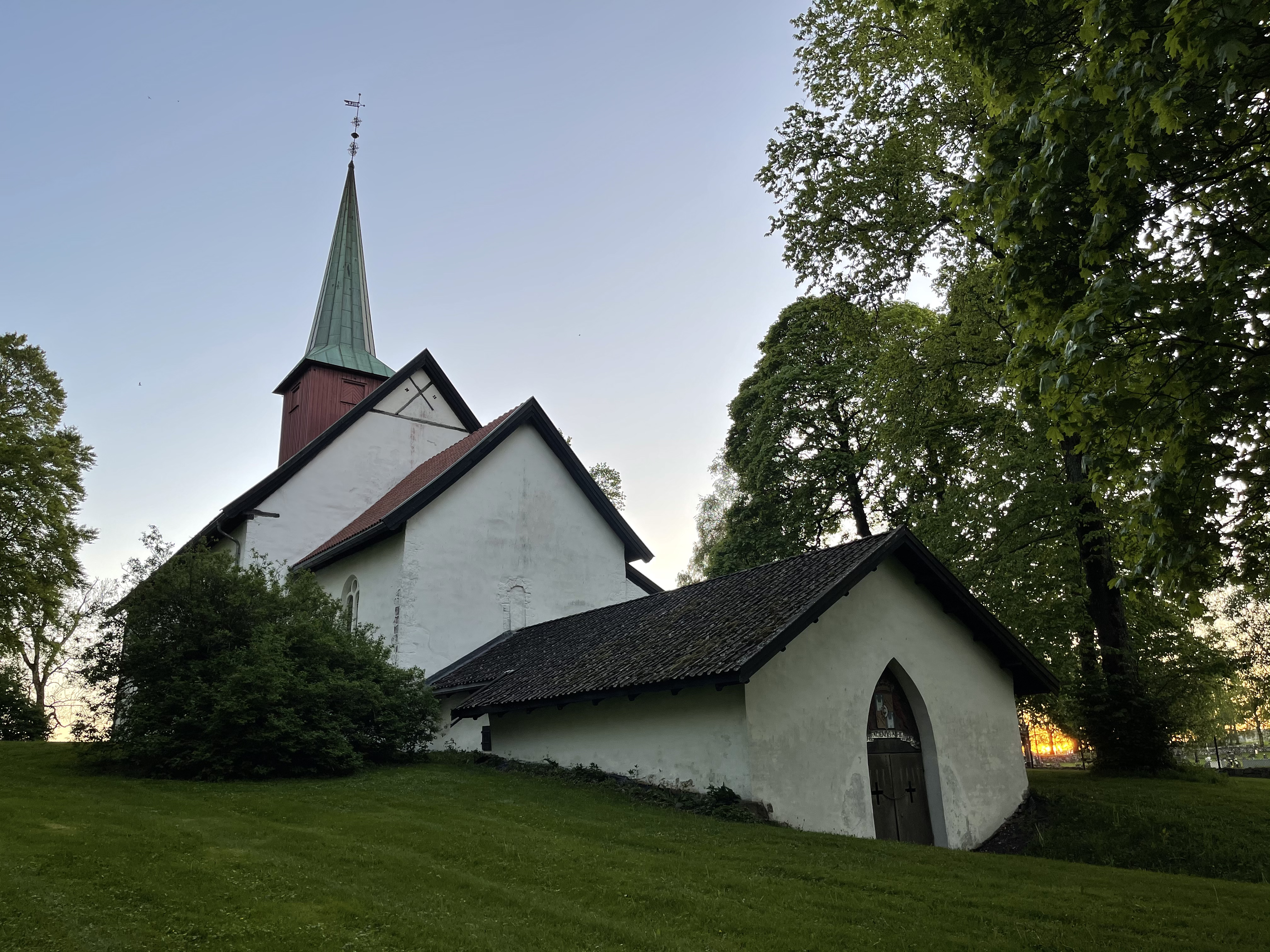

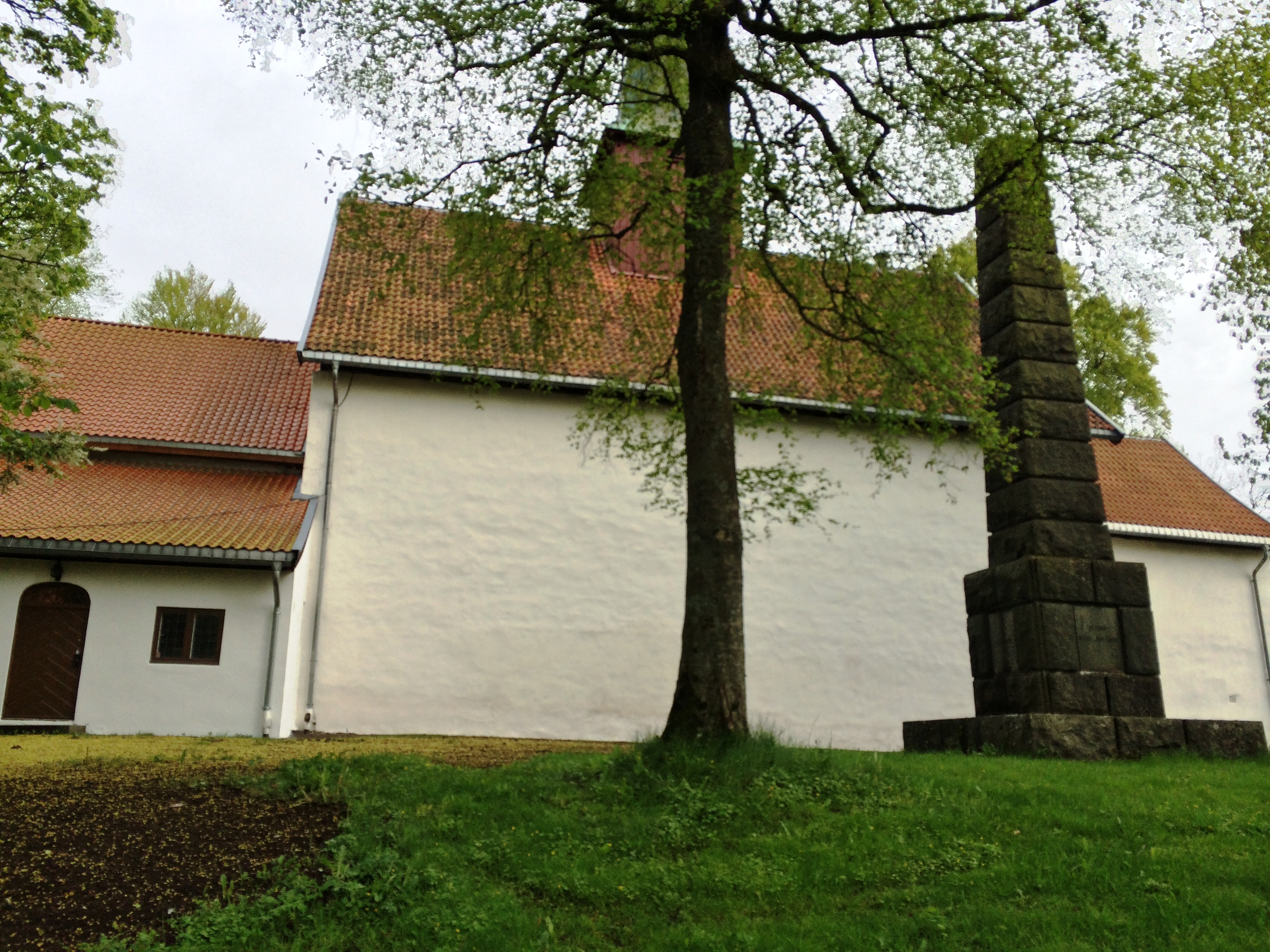

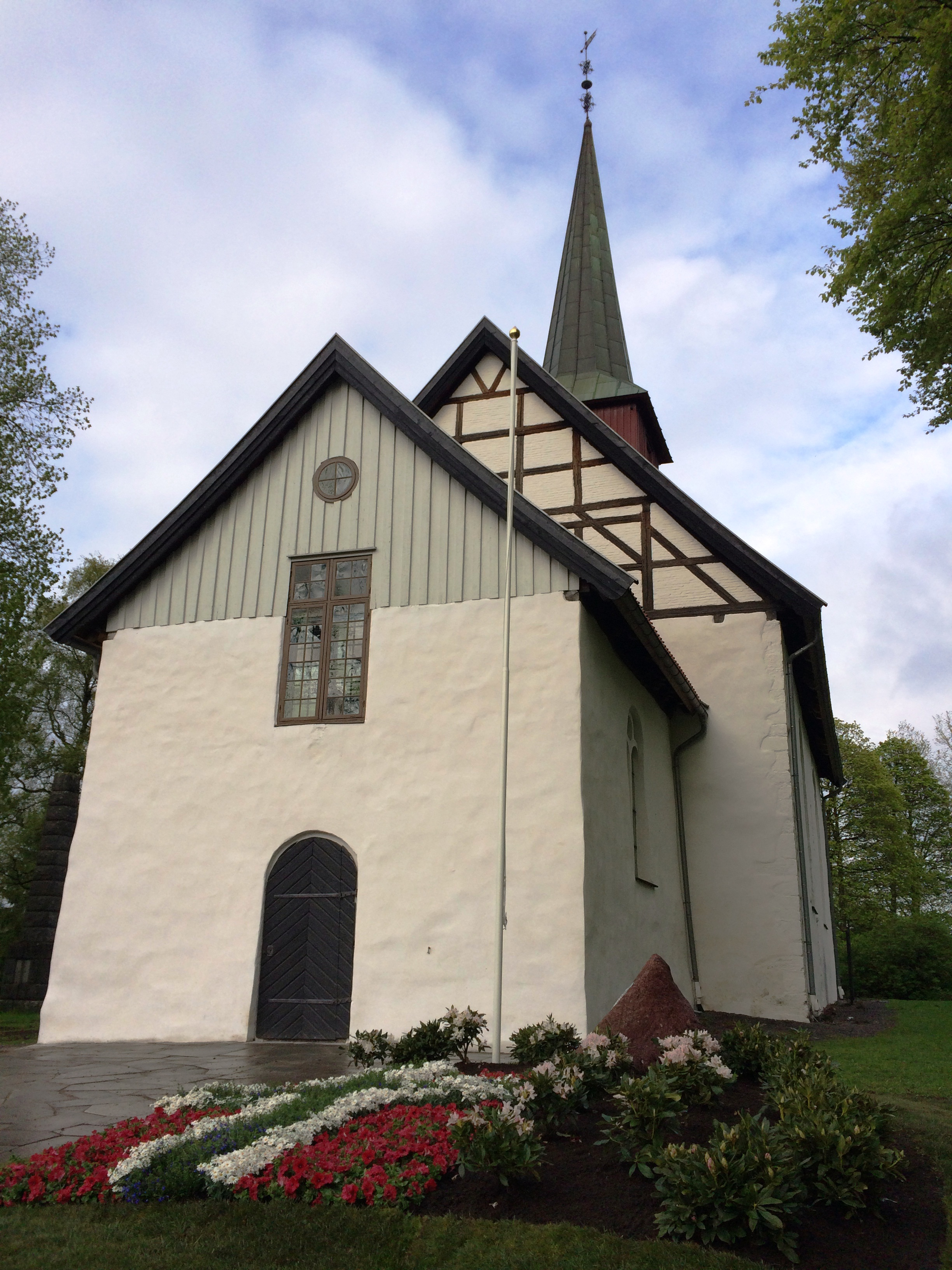

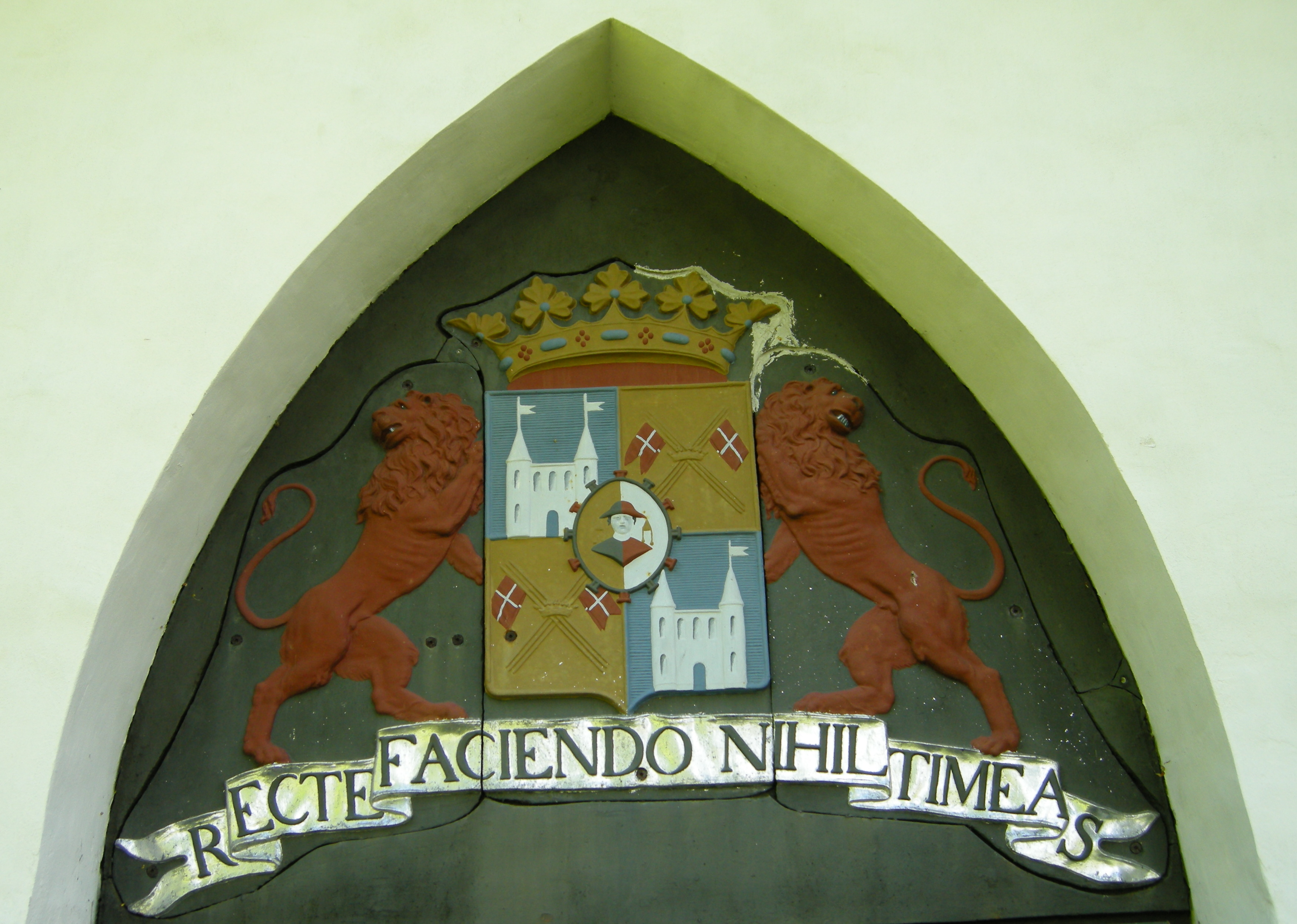

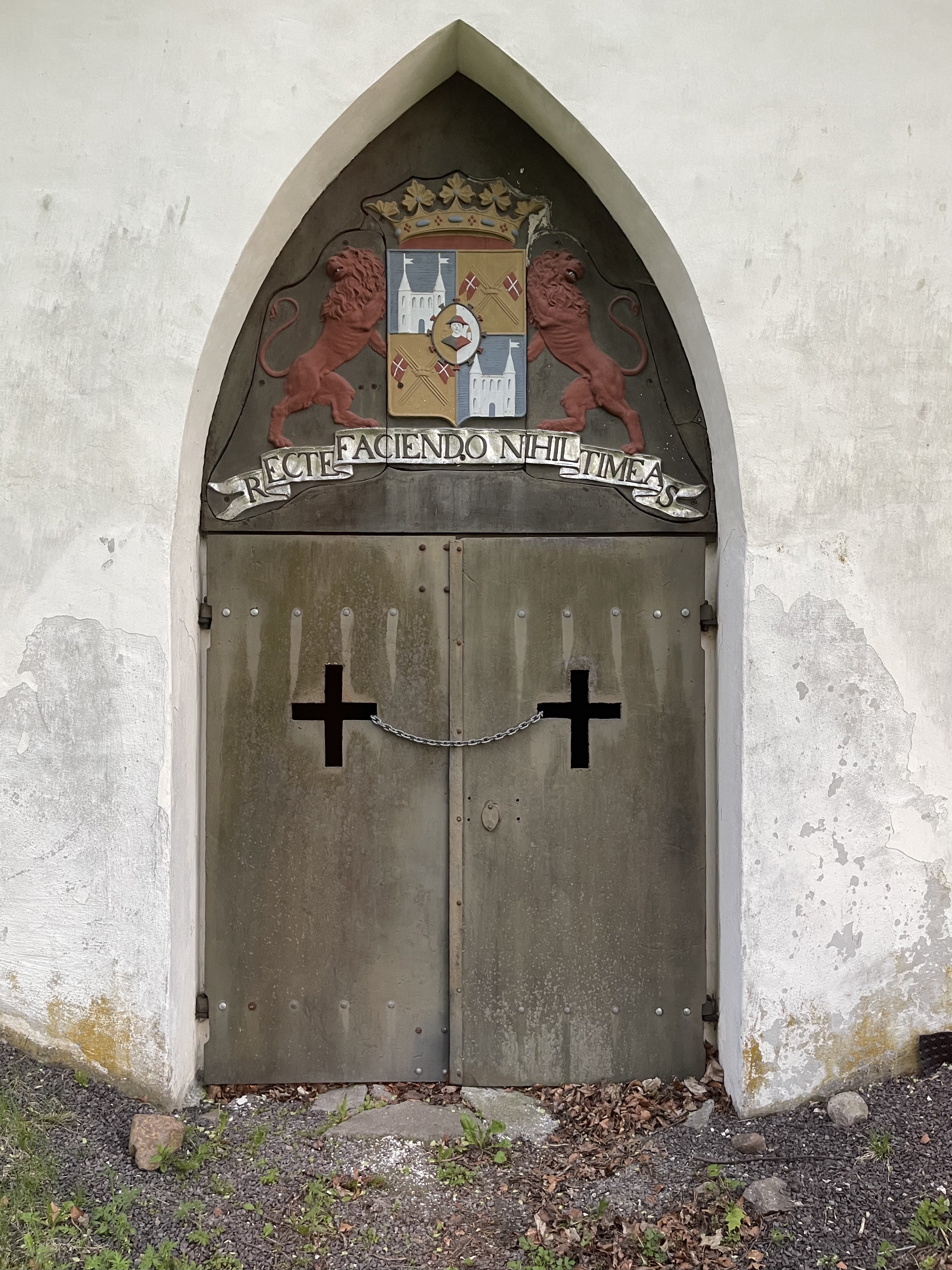

== See also ==
- List of churches in Tunsberg
