= Trygve Sverdrup =

Norwegian politician

- Born: 22 July 1886; Christiania, Norway
- Died: 24 January 1964; Tønsberg, Norway
- Occupations: Naval officer Politician
- Parent: Harald Ulrik Sverdrup

Trygve Sverdrup (22 July 1886 – 24 January 1964) was a Norwegian naval officer and politician.

He was born in Christiania to engineer Harald Ulrik Sverdrup and Ragna Valborg Dahl, and graduated as naval officer in 1908. He was elected representative to the Storting for the periods 1934–1936 and 1937–1945, for the Conservative Party. He was member of the municipal council of Tønsberg from 1923, and served as mayor 1936–1937. He was decorated Knight of the Order of the White Rose of Finland.
