= Lauga, Norway =

Village in Nærøysund Municipality, Norway

Lauga
- Village
- Interactive map of Lauga
- Location within Trøndelag Location within Norway
- Coordinates: 64.7981°N 11.4347°E
- Country: Norway
- Region: Central Norway
- County: Trøndelag
- District: Namdalen
- Municipality: Nærøysund Municipality
- Elevation: 10 m (33 ft)
- Time zone: UTC+01:00 (CET)
  - Summer (DST): UTC+02:00 (CEST)
- Post Code: 7970 Kolvereid

Lauga is a fishing village in Nærøysund Municipality in Trøndelag county, Norway. The village lies about 8 kilometres (5.0 mi) northeast of the village of Steine and about 15 kilometres (9.3 mi) southwest of the town of Kolvereid.

== Notable people ==
- Georg Sverdrup, a Norwegian statesman who was born in Lauga
