= Barkåker =

Village in Tønsberg Municipality, Norway

- Village
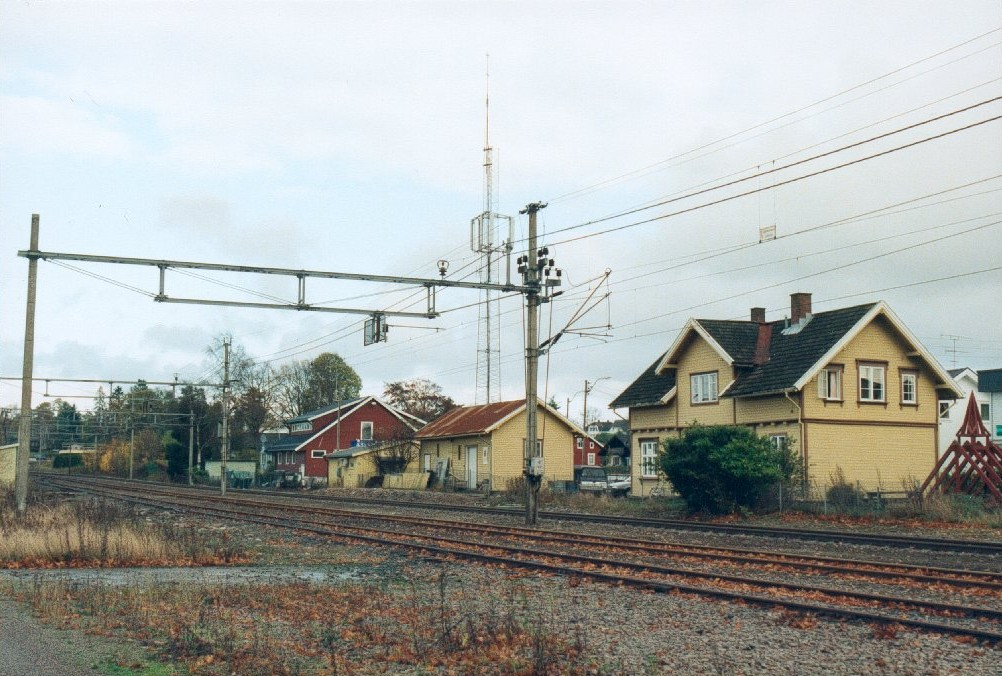
- View of the village railway station
- Interactive map of Barkåker
- Coordinates: 59.31856°N 10.3897°E
- Country: Norway
- Region: Eastern Norway
- County: Vestfold
- Municipality: Tønsberg Municipality

Area
  - Total: 1.13 km^{2} (0.44 sq mi)
- Elevation: 49 m (161 ft)

Population (2026)
  - Total: 1,850
  - Density: 1,637/km^{2} (4,240/sq mi)
- Time zone: UTC+01:00 (CET)
  - Summer (DST): UTC+02:00 (CEST)
- Post Code: 3157 Barkåker

Barkåker is a village in Tønsberg Municipality in Vestfold county, Norway. It is located along the European route E18, about 5 kilometres (3.1 mi) to the northwest of the city of Tønsberg. The mediaeval Sem Church lies about 2 kilometres (1.2 mi) to the south of the village.

The 1.13-square-kilometre (280-acre) village has a population (2026) of 1,850 and a population density of 1,637 inhabitants per square kilometre (4,240/sq mi).
