= Georg Sverdrup =

Norwegian politician (1770–1850)

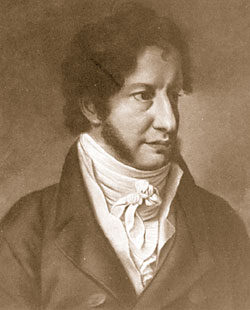
- Portrait by Christian Horneman, 1813

Member of the Storting
- In office 1818–1820
- Constituency: Christiania
- In office 1824–1826
- Constituency: Christiania

Personal details
- Born: Jørgen Sverdrup; 25 April 1770 Laugen, Trøndelag, Denmark–Norway
- Died: 8 December 1850 (aged 80) Oslo, Norway, Sweden–Norway
- Education: University of Copenhagen
- Occupation: Philologist, educator, librarian

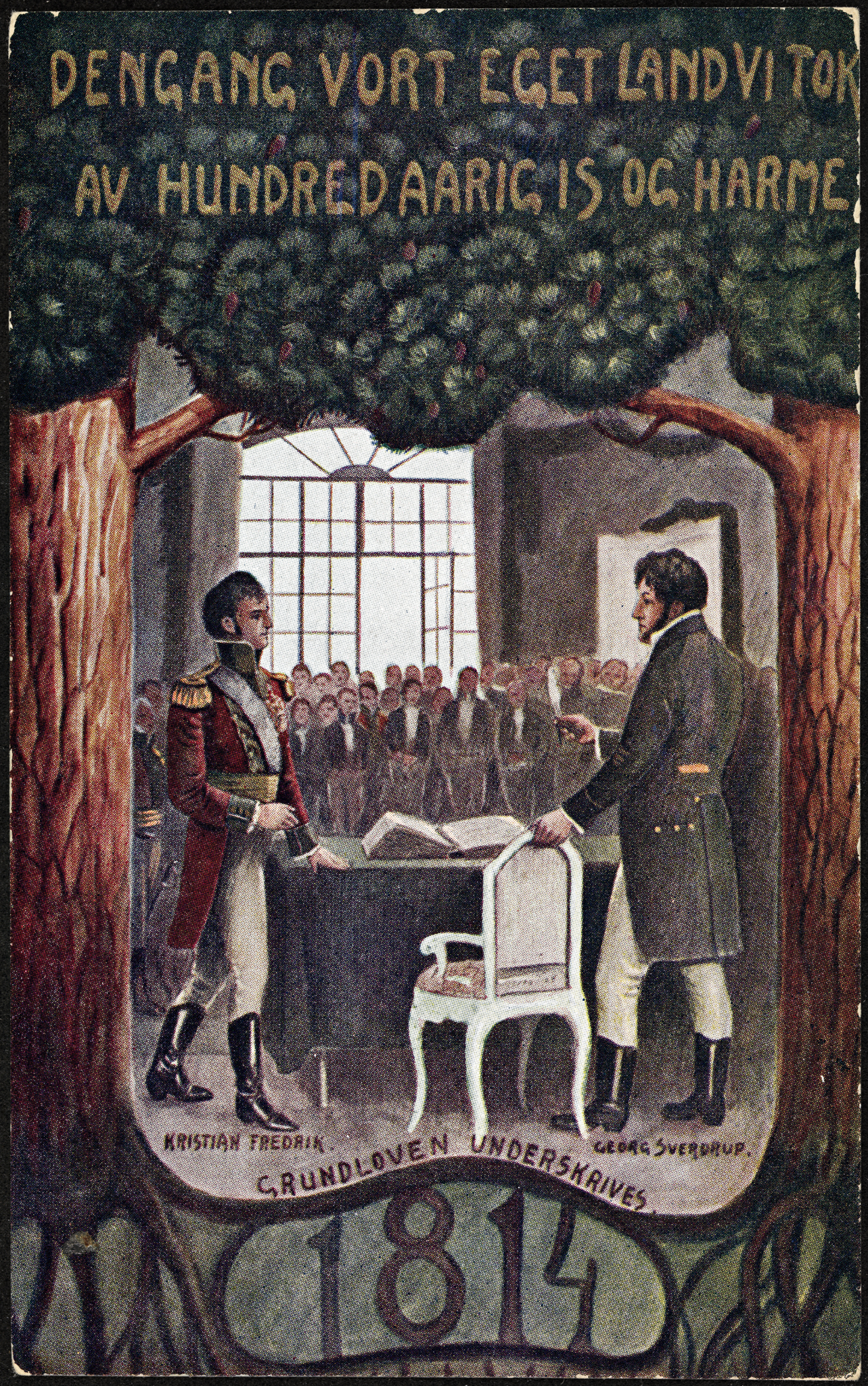
100th anniversary of the signing of the Norwegian Constitution (National Library of Norway. 1918)

Georg Sverdrup (born Jørgen Sverdrup; 25 April 1770 – 8 December 1850) was a Norwegian statesman, best known as one of the presidents of the Norwegian Constituent Assembly at Eidsvoll Manor in 1814. He was a member of the Norwegian Parliament and was also responsible for the development of the first Norwegian university library.

== Biography ==
Georg Sverdrup was born in the fishing village of Laugen in the prestegjeld of Nærøy in Nord-Trøndelag county, Norway. He was the uncle of brothers Harald Ulrik Sverdrup, who served as a member of Norwegian Parliament, and Johan Sverdrup, who was the Prime Minister of Norway. Georg Sverdrup, the Norwegian-American Lutheran theologian, was his great-nephew.

Georg Sverdrup entered the University of Copenhagen during 1794 and graduated with a degree in philology in 1798. During the period 1798–1799, he studied at the University of Göttingen.

He represented Christiania at the Norwegian Constitutional Assembly during 1814 at Eidsvoll Manor. He was the last president of the Assembly, chosen the second last day, 16 May. He led the election of the king and gave the closing speech. During the drafting of the Norwegian constitution, Sverdrup was one of the principle authors of the Jew clause, which prohibited Jews from entering Norway. He was later elected to the Norwegian Parliament in 1817 and 1823.

Sverdrup became professor of Greek at the University of Copenhagen in 1805. Sverdrup was librarian of the university library from 1813 to 1845. The University of Oslo was established in 1811 under the name Royal Frederick University, but due to the Napoleonic War it was not until 1815 that Sverdrup could receive the 50,000 volumes, then in Copenhagen, intended for the new university library. It took another year for the government to provide adequate localities for the collection, and not until 1828 was the library finally completed, with a total of 90,000 volumes.

Georg Sverdrup is buried at Vår Frelsers gravlund. Sverdrups gate in the district of Grünerløkka in Oslo was named in his honor. The new university library at Blindern (Georg Sverdrups hus – Universitetsbibliotekets), finished in 1999, is named after Georg Sverdrup. It houses more than 2,000,000 books.

== See also ==
- Norway in 1814
