= Jarlsberg (countship) =

Vestfold county in Norway

- Vestfold county, with the former Jarlsberg in blue.
- Interactive map of Jarlsberg
- Coordinates: 59°22′41″N 10°18′38″E

Jarlsberg was a countship in Norway that became part of Vestfold county. The name translates as "Earl's Hill".

The former countships of Jarlsberg and Larvik were merged into a county in 1821, and that county (Jarlsberg og Larviks amt) was renamed Vestfold in 1919.

Created in 1673 as Griffenfeldt Countship (Griffenfeld grevskap), it was after a few years known as Tønsberg Countship (Tønsberg grevskap) until 1684, when the name became Jarlsberg. From 1681, the countship was associated with members of a Dano-Norwegian noble family called Wedel-Jarlsberg. The countship was abolished in 1893 in accordance with Norway's nobility law, but the family still owns the manor.

== House of Griffenfeld ==
Jarlsberg was originally created as a countship in 1673 for Peder Schumacher Griffenfeld, a Danish statesman and Chancellor of Denmark during the reign of King Christian V of Denmark. Schumacher received in 1671 an armorial grant with the name Griffenfeld. The creation involved that Count Griffenfeld, in addition to owning 14 percent of the countship's land, received large tax revenues and also the right to appoint all civil and ecclesiastical officials, including officers and judges, who would serve within the countship.

- 1673–1676 Count Peder Schumacher Griffenfeld

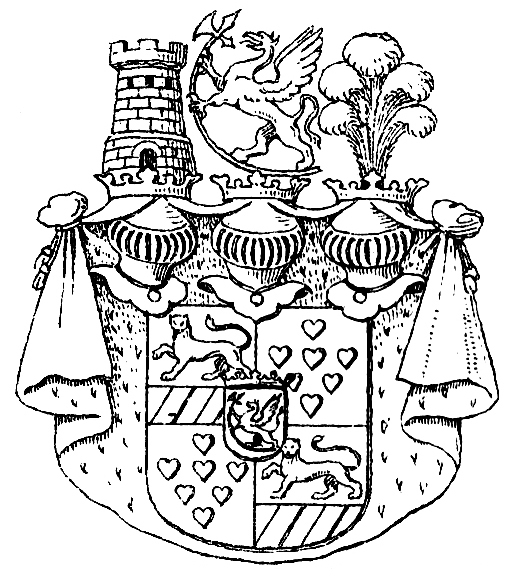
Coat of arms Griffenfeld.

== House of Gyldenløve ==
After Griffenfeld's arrest in 1676 in the aftermath of the Scanian War, his properties and countship were renamed Tønsberg Countship and were transferred by King Christian V to Ulrik Fredrik Gyldenløve, the Count of Larvik. Gyldenløve, an illegitimate son of King Frederick III of Denmark, was the Viceroy (Statholder) of Norway.

- 1676–1684 Count Ulrik Fredrik Gyldenløve

== House of Wedel-Jarlsberg ==
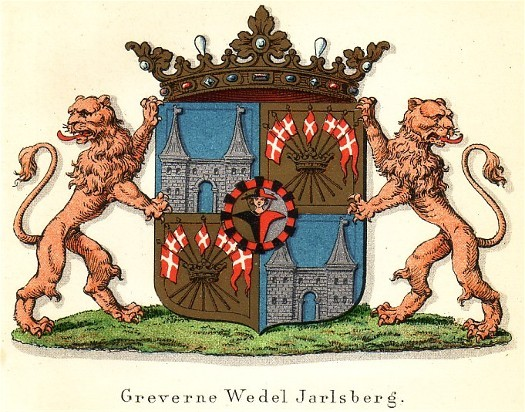
Coat of arms of the counts of Wedel Jarlsberg

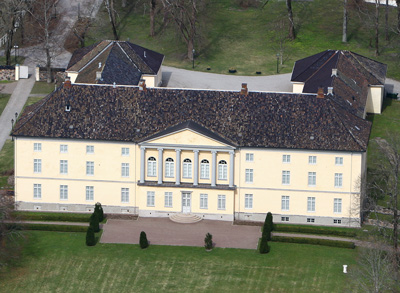
Jarlsberg manor

In 1683, Ulrik Fredrik Gyldenløve sold Tønsberg countship to Gustav Frederik Wilhelm Wedel. Wedel was from an ancient noble family of Holstein, and received naturalization patent in 1681 as Friherre von Wedel by king Christian V. Field Marshal Wedel, who had become the commanding general in Norway in 1681, received the title Lensgreve patent with the name Wedel af Jarlsberg in 1684 and introduced the name Jarlsberg, which translates as "Earl's Hill".

- 1684–1718 Count Gustav Wilhelm von Wedel-Jarlsberg
- 1718–1738 Count Frederik Anton Wedel Jarlsberg
- 1738–1776 Count Frederik Christian Otto Wedel Jarlsberg
- 1776–1811 Count Frederik Anton II Wedel Jarlsberg
- 1811–1840 Count Johan Caspar Herman Wedel Jarlsberg
- 1840–1893 Peder Anker Wedel Jarlsberg

== See also ==
- Jarlsberg cheese – a type of cheese that originates from the region
- Countship of Larvik – the other countship in Norway
