= Livius Smitt =

Norwegian jurist and politician

Livius Smitt (8 October 1840 – 4 March 1890) was a Norwegian jurist and politician, joining the Conservative Party in 1884.

Born in Vinje Municipality, he moved to Førde Municipality where he served as a barrister from 1867 until 1881, and as major from 1874 to 1881. He was one of the founders of the newspaper Nordre Bergenhus Amtstidende in 1872 and Florø Træplantningsselskab. There is a street named for him in the town. He sat as a deputy member of the Parliament of Norway from 1877 to 1879 and then as a regular representative from 1880 to 1882. He then moved to Brevik where he also was elected as a parliamentarian. He turned down a seat in Stang's Cabinet. During the late 1880s, Smitt was one of the main proponents of the Brevik Line, but died before Parliament passed the line in 1892.
