= Jarlsberg Manor =

Manor house in Tønsberg Municipality, Norway

Coordinates: 59°17′27″N 10°23′12″E

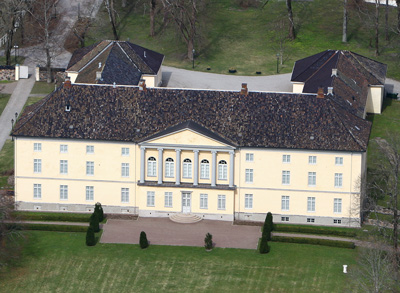
Jarlsberg Hovedgård

Jarlsberg Manor (Norwegian: Jarlsberg Hovedgård) is a manor located about 3 kilometres (1.9 mi) northwest of the centre of the town of Tønsberg in Tønsberg Municipality, Vestfold county, Norway. It has traditionally been the residence of members of the Wedel-Jarlsberg family and the Count and Countess of Jarlsberg who led the County of Jarlsberg.

== History ==
In September 1683, Ulrik Fredrik Gyldenløve, the illegitimate son of the King, sold the manor to Danish officer Gustav Wilhelm Wedel Jarlsberg (1641–1717), who was made Commanding General in Norway in 1681. Field Marshal von Wedel received the name Wedel af Jarlsberg in 1684, at which time he was created a feudal count by letters patent.

After a fire in 1699, the manor house was rebuilt. In 1812, Feudal Count Johan Caspar Herman Wedel-Jarlsberg again rebuilt the manor, in the Empire style. Around the manor house, large but simple garden and park areas were arranged.

The manor house is mainly from 1812, but with various improvements. The first floor of the main building is the column hall that has been used for concerts. Knight's hall, on the second floor, is used for private companies. There are other public trails over the property along the shoreline and through woodland, which is also a private cemetery. Jarlsberg Estate is today one of Norway's largest farms, with about 750 acres (3.0 km^{2}) cultivated land.

== Viking ship archaeological site discovery ==
In June 2024, archaeologists announced the discovery of the remains a Viking ship on the grounds of the manor with numerous rivets and two horse crampons, discovered using ground-penetrating radar.
