= Fjell Church (Buskerud) =

Church in Buskerud, Norway

- Fjell kirke
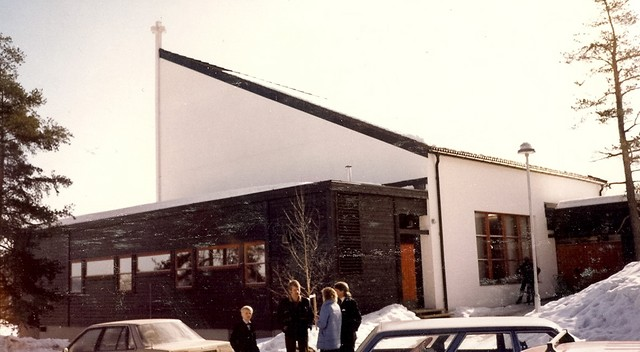
- View of the church
- Fjell Church
- 59°43′01″N 10°13′13″E
- Location: Drammen Municipality, Buskerud
- Country: Norway
- Denomination: Church of Norway
- Churchmanship: Evangelical Lutheran

History
- Status: Parish church
- Founded: 1984
- Consecrated: 26 Aug 1984

Architecture
- Functional status: Active
- Architect: Elisabet Fidjestøl
- Architectural type: Fan-shaped
- Completed: 1984 (42 years ago)

Specifications
- Capacity: 425
- Materials: Concrete

Administration
- Diocese: Tunsberg bispedømme
- Deanery: Drammen og Lier prosti
- Parish: Austad Fjell

Fjell Church (Norwegian: Fjell kirke) is a parish church of the Church of Norway in Drammen Municipality in Buskerud county, Norway. It is located in the village of Fjell. It is the church for the Austad Fjell parish which is part of the Drammen og Lier prosti (deanery) in the Diocese of Tunsberg. The white, concrete church was built in a long church design in 1984 using plans drawn up by the architect Elisabet Fidjestøl. The church seats about 425 people.

== History ==
Planning for a new church in the southeast part of the city of Drammen began in the 1960s. In 1973, the first draft drawings were submitted by the architect, Elisabet Fidjestøl. These were approved, but it was not until 1983 before construction work began. The new church was consecrated on 26 August 1984. The church has a concrete exterior that is faced with bricks on the inside. On the main floor there is a sanctuary, a congregational hall, and an office area. The lower floor contains a youth hall and various smaller meeting rooms as well as a kitchen, bathrooms, and a coat room.

== See also ==
- List of churches in Tunsberg
