= Nanset Church =

Church in Vestfold, Norway

- Nanset kirke
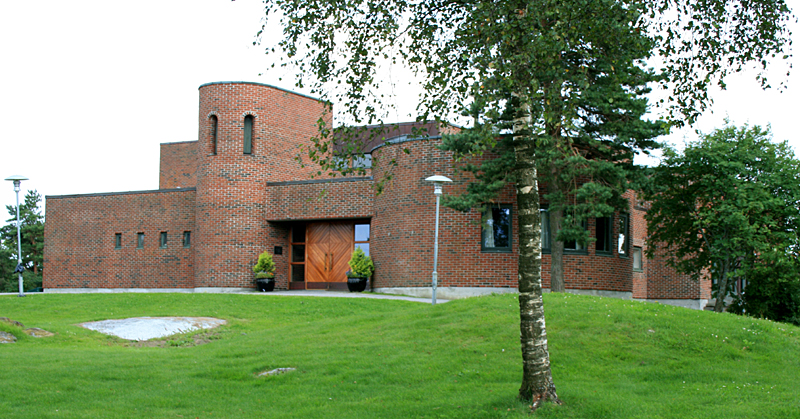
- View of the church
- Nanset Church
- 59°04′00″N 10°03′22″E
- Location: Larvik Municipality, Vestfold
- Country: Norway
- Denomination: Church of Norway
- Churchmanship: Evangelical Lutheran

History
- Status: Parish church
- Founded: 1974
- Consecrated: 31 March 1974

Architecture
- Functional status: Active
- Architect: Elisabeth Breen Fidjestøl
- Architectural type: Rectangular
- Style: Modern
- Completed: 1974 (52 years ago)

Specifications
- Capacity: 550
- Materials: Brick

Administration
- Diocese: Tunsberg
- Deanery: Larvik prosti
- Parish: Nanset
- Norwegian Cultural Heritage Site
- Type: Church
- Status: Not protected
- ID: 85092

Nanset Church (Norwegian: Nanset kirke) is a parish church of the Church of Norway in Larvik Municipality in Vestfold county, Norway. It is located in the town of Larvik. It is the church for the Nanset parish which is part of the Larvik prosti (deanery) in the Diocese of Tunsberg. The red brick church was built in a rectangular design in 1974 using plans drawn up by the architect Elisabeth Breen Fidjestøl. The church seats about 550 people.

== History ==
In 1970, plans were made to build a new church in the northern part of the town of Larvik. Elisabet Fidjestøl won an architectural competition to design the new church with her plans which she called "Living stones". Construction began in 1973 and the new church was consecrated on 31 March 1974. The church was renovated in 2000.

== See also ==
- List of churches in Tunsberg
