= Sentrum Church =

Church in Vestfold, Norway

- Sentrumkirken
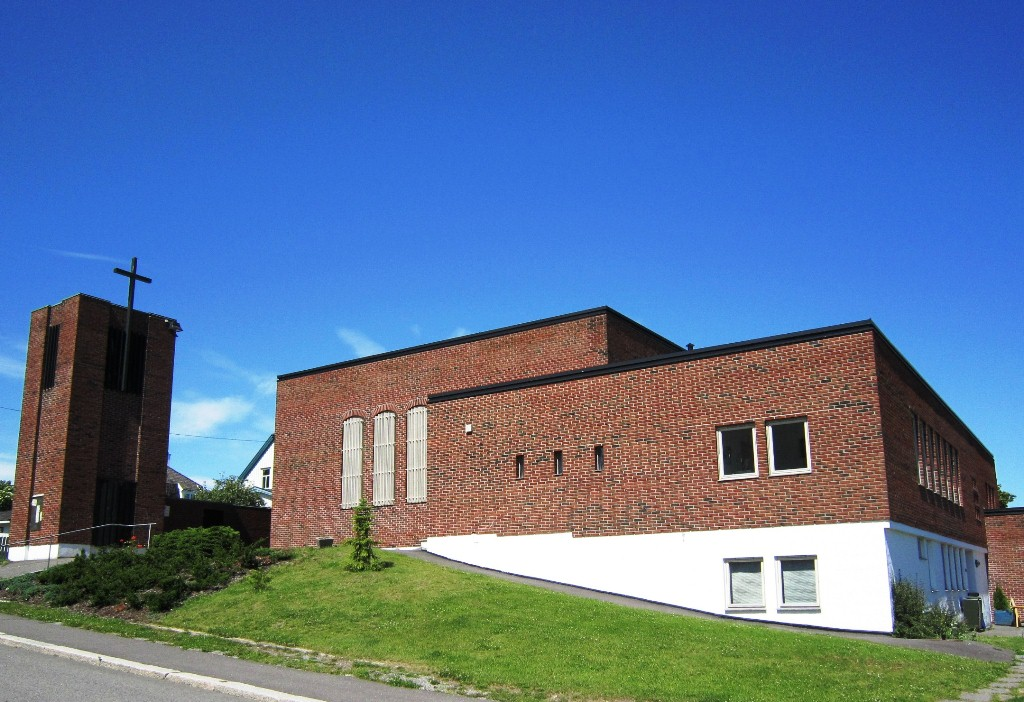
- View of the church
- Sentrum Church
- 59°24′42″N 10°28′38″E
- Location: Horten Municipality, Vestfold
- Country: Norway
- Denomination: Church of Norway
- Churchmanship: Evangelical Lutheran

History
- Status: Parish church
- Founded: 1972
- Consecrated: 1972

Architecture
- Functional status: Active
- Architect: Elisabet Fidjestøl
- Architectural type: Long church
- Completed: 1972 (54 years ago)

Specifications
- Capacity: 300
- Materials: Brick

Administration
- Diocese: Tunsberg
- Deanery: Nord-Jarlsberg prosti
- Parish: Horten

Sentrum Church (Norwegian: Sentrumskirken) is a parish church of the Church of Norway in Horten Municipality in Vestfold county, Norway. It is located in the town of Horten. It is one of the churches for the Horten parish which is part of the Nord-Jarlsberg prosti (deanery) in the Diocese of Tunsberg. The red brick church was built in a long church design in 1972 using plans drawn up by the architect Elisabet Fidjestøl. The church seats up to 300 people.

== History ==
In 1855, the large Horten Church was built to serve the growing town of Horten. In the 1920s, discussions began about building another church for the town. In 1971, the foundation stone was laid for the new church in the central part of the town (hence the name "sentrum" for central). The church was built during 1972 and put into use the same year. It was designed by Elisabet Fidjestøl. This brick church has around 200 seats in the nave and room for an additional 100 in the congregation hall, which is separated from the nave by folding doors. The church is owned by Stiftelsen Sentrumskirken and is run by a board. The building also includes a number of other areas including offices for administration of the Horten parish and Nord-Jarlsberg prosti. A nursery is run on the lower floor (with its own entrance). The facility's main entrance is on the main floor. There is no cemetery at the site of this church.

== See also ==
- List of churches in Tunsberg
