= Tunhovd Church =

Church in Buskerud, Norway

- Tunhovd kirke
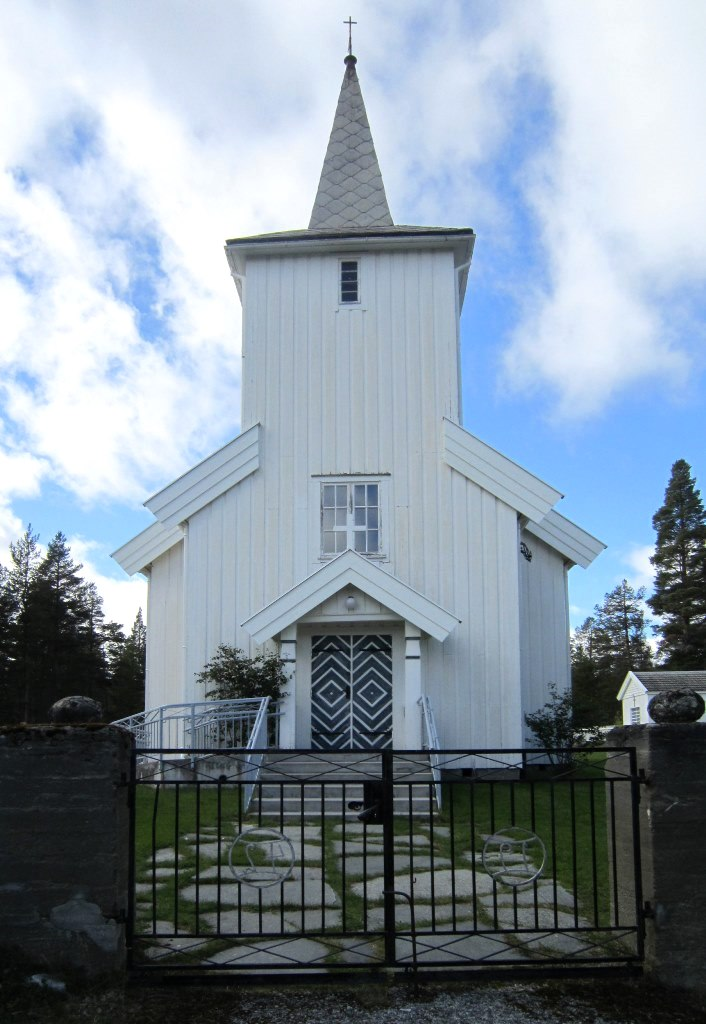
- View of the church
- Tunhovd Church
- 60°27′27″N 8°44′47″E
- Location: Nore og Uvdal, Buskerud
- Country: Norway
- Denomination: Church of Norway
- Churchmanship: Evangelical Lutheran

History
- Status: Parish church
- Founded: 1942
- Consecrated: 30 Sept 1945

Architecture
- Functional status: Active
- Architect: Arne Rustberggard
- Architectural type: Long church
- Completed: 1942 (84 years ago)

Specifications
- Capacity: 150
- Materials: Wood

Administration
- Diocese: Tunsberg
- Deanery: Kongsberg prosti
- Parish: Tunhovd
- Norwegian Cultural Heritage Site
- Type: Church
- Status: Not protected
- ID: 85687

Tunhovd Church (Norwegian: Tunhovd kirke) is a parish church of the Church of Norway in Nore og Uvdal Municipality in Buskerud county, Norway. It is located in the village of Tunhovd. It is the church for the Tunhovd parish which is part of the Kongsberg prosti (deanery) in the Diocese of Tunsberg. The white, wooden church was built in a long church design in 1942 using plans drawn up by the architect Arne Rustberggard. The church seats about 150 people.

== History ==
The Tunhovd Women's Association started pushing for a cemetery to be built in Tunhovd in 1918, but it took some time before the cemetery was built. The new cemetery was consecrated on 28 September 1935. Soon after, there was also fundraising for a church building at the same site. Once approval was granted, the new church was designed by Arne Rustberggard and built in 1941–1942. The new church was consecrated by Bishop Eivind Berggrav on 30 September 1945, after the war ended. Initially, it wwas called Tunhovd Chapel, but today the building is called a church. Tunhovd Church is a traditionally designed long church with a tower at the entrance, a rectangular nave and a narrower choir in the extension. The choir is apsidal and surrounded by sacristies (priest sacristy and baptismal waiting room on each side, so that the body of the building has an even width).

== See also ==
- List of churches in Tunsberg
