= Skurdalen Church =

Church in Buskerud, Norway

- Skurdalskyrkja
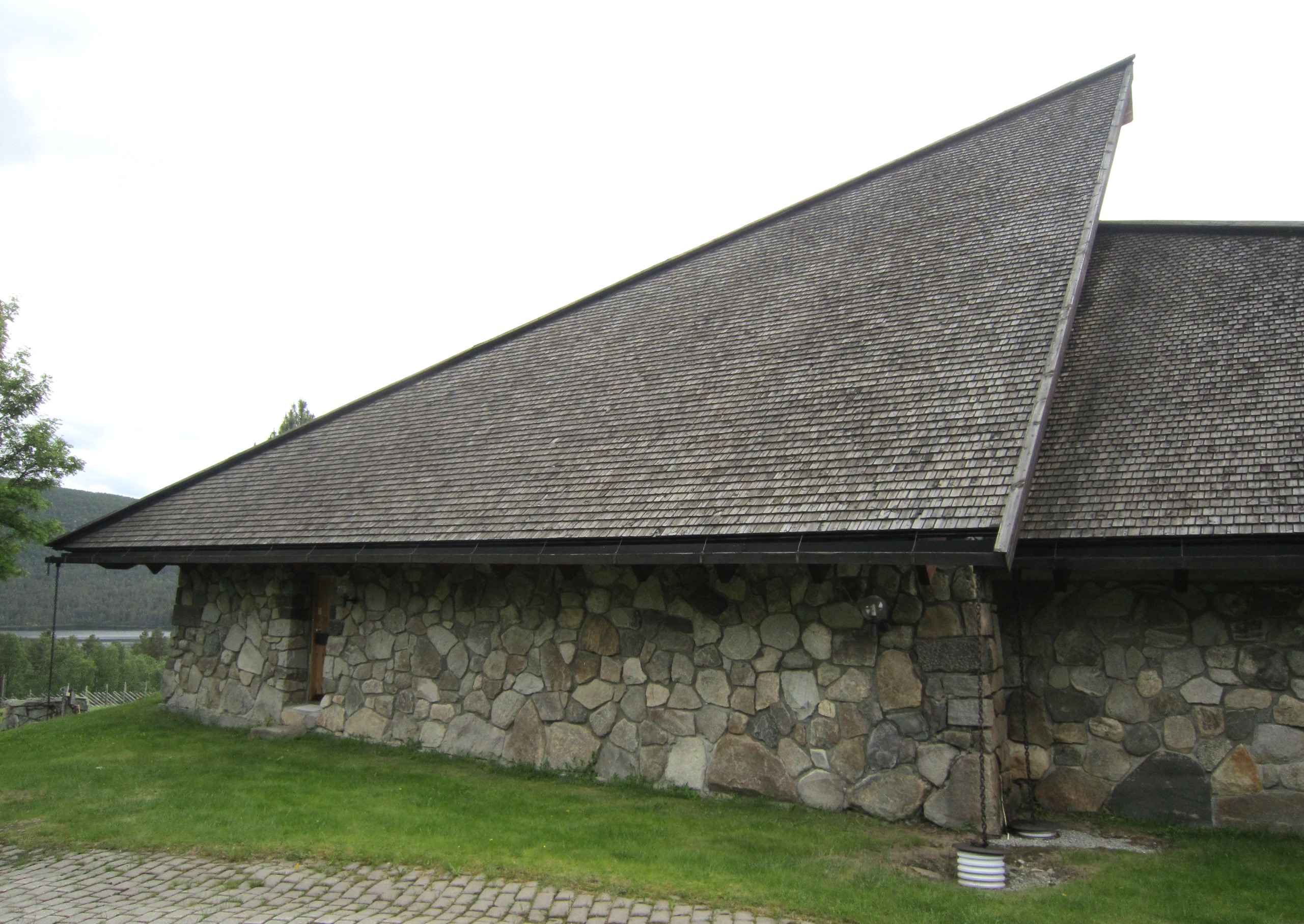
- View of the church
- Skurdalen Church
- 60°28′35″N 8°18′03″E
- Location: Hol, Buskerud
- Country: Norway
- Denomination: Church of Norway
- Churchmanship: Evangelical Lutheran

History
- Status: Parish church
- Founded: 1969
- Consecrated: 7 Sept 1969

Architecture
- Functional status: Active
- Architect(s): Skoug & Skoug
- Architectural type: Fan-shaped
- Completed: 1969 (57 years ago)

Specifications
- Capacity: 150
- Materials: Stone

Administration
- Diocese: Tunsberg
- Deanery: Hallingdal prosti
- Parish: Dagali og Skurdalen
- Norwegian Cultural Heritage Site
- Type: Church
- Status: Not protected
- ID: 85484

Skurdalen Church (Norwegian: Skurdalskyrkja) is a parish church of the Church of Norway in Hol Municipality in Buskerud county, Norway. It is located in the village of Flatåker. It is one of the churches for the Dagali og Skurdalen parish which is part of the Hallingdal prosti (deanery) in the Diocese of Tunsberg. The gray, stone church was built in a fan-shaped design in 1969 using plans drawn up by the architectural firm Skoug & Skoug. The church seats about 150 people.

== History ==
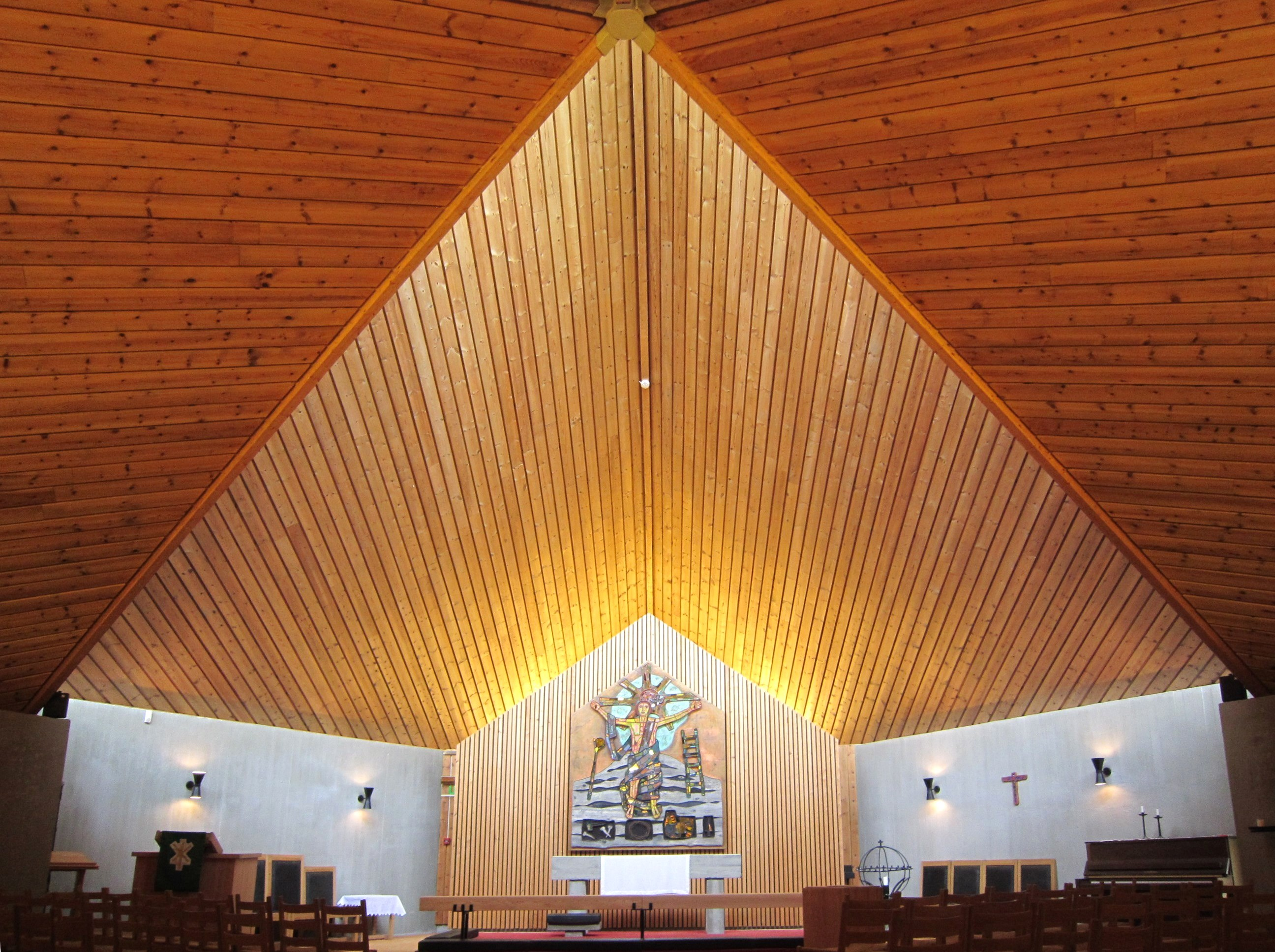
View of the interior

A cemetery on the present church site was consecrated on 2 October 1938. In the 1960s plans for the construction of a church on the cemetery site began to move forward. The architects Skoug & Skoug (father and son Helge) submitted drawings, and a building permit was granted in the autumn of 1967. The church was built in 1968-1969 by builder Bjarne Kristiansen. The new building was consecrated by the bishop on 7 September 1969. The building was originally called Skurdalen Chapel, but now it is called Skurdalen Church. The church is built of concrete and faced with natural stone on the outside. The base is triangular, and the roof structure is reminiscent of pyramids. The roof is thatched.

== See also ==
- List of churches in Tunsberg
