= Styrvoll Church =

Church in Vestfold, Norway

- Styrvoll kirke
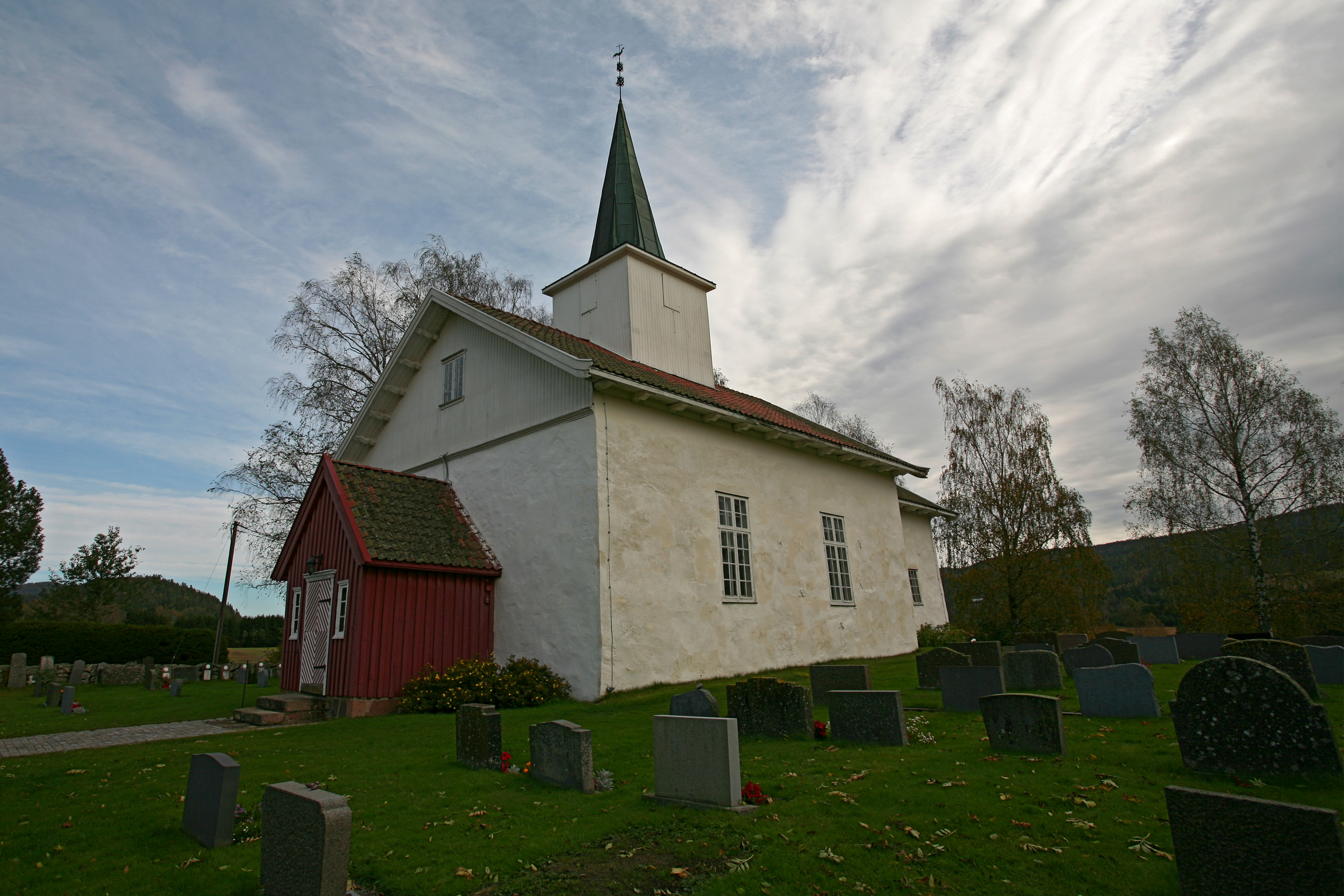
- View of the church
- Styrvoll Church
- 59°20′16″N 9°53′45″E
- Location: Larvik Municipality, Vestfold
- Country: Norway
- Denomination: Church of Norway
- Previous denomination: Catholic Church
- Churchmanship: Evangelical Lutheran

History
- Status: Parish church
- Founded: c. 1150

Architecture
- Functional status: Active
- Architectural type: Long church
- Completed: c. 1150 (876 years ago)

Specifications
- Capacity: 100
- Materials: Stone

Administration
- Diocese: Tunsberg
- Deanery: Larvik prosti
- Parish: Lardal
- Norwegian Cultural Heritage Site
- Type: Church
- Status: Automatically protected
- ID: 84991

Styrvoll Church (Norwegian: Styrvoll kirke) is a parish church of the Church of Norway in Larvik Municipality in Vestfold county, Norway. It is located in the village of Styrvoll. It is one of the churches for the Lardal parish which is part of the Larvik prosti (deanery) in the Diocese of Tunsberg. The white, stone church was built in a long church design around the year 1150 using plans drawn up by an unknown architect. The church seats about 100 people.

== History ==
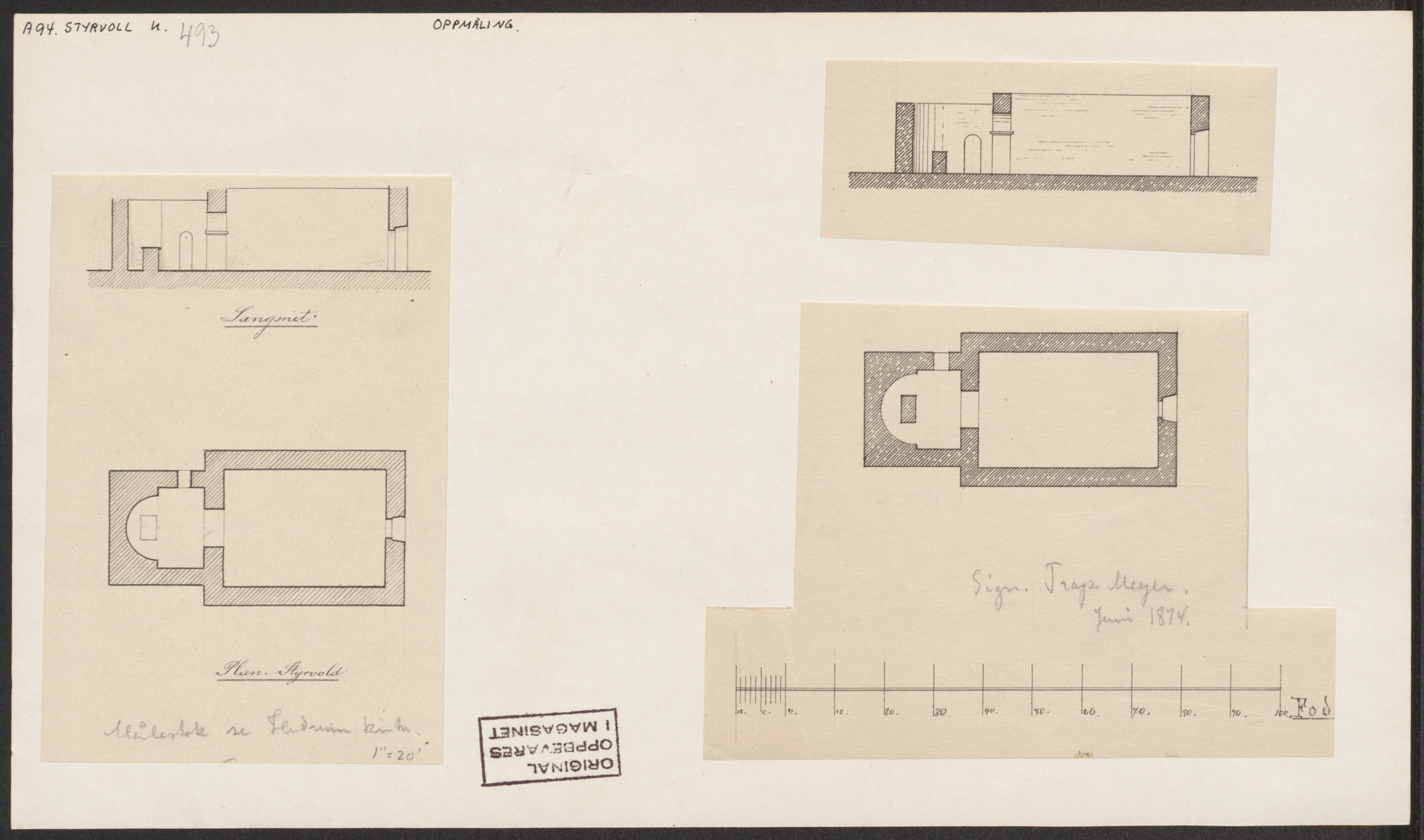
Floorplans of the church

The earliest existing historical records of the church date back to the year 1385, but the church was not built that year. The small stone church was likely built in the middle of the 12th century. The building was originally dedicated to Saint Laurentius. The building is a long church with a rectangular nave and a choir that is almost square. For many years the church was owned by the Count of Larvik. In 1766, the church was sold to local farmers. The municipality took over ownership of the church in 1867. In the 1870s, the church was repaired. The roof structure was rebuilt and the tower on the roof was built at that time.

== See also ==
- List of churches in Tunsberg
