= List of churches in Tunsberg =

Map of the deaneries within the Diocese of Tunsberg

This list of churches in Tunsberg is a list of the Church of Norway churches in the Diocese of Tunsberg in Norway. It includes all of the parishes in Buskerud and Vestfold counties. The diocese is based at the Tønsberg Cathedral in the city of Tønsberg in Tønsberg Municipality, Vestfold county. The diocese was formally established in 1948 when it was separated from the large Diocese of Oslo, although the occupation government during World War II also temporarily established the diocese of Tunsberg from 1942 to 1945, but that was not recognized by the King or the government-in-exile during the war.

The list is divided into several sections, one for each deanery (prosti; headed by a provost) in the diocese. Administratively within each deanery, the churches within each municipality elects their own church council (fellesråd). Each municipality may have one or more parishes (sokn) within the municipality. Each parish elects their own councils (soknerådet). Each parish has one or more local church. The number and size of the deaneries and parishes has changed over time.

== Tønsberg domprosti ==
This arch-deanery (Norwegian: domprosti) covers all the churches within Tønsberg Municipality and Færder Municipality in Vestfold county. The arch-deanery is headquartered at the Tønsberg Cathedral in the city of Tønsberg in Tønsberg Municipality.

Historically, this area was part of the old Jarlsberg prosti, which historically included the whole Jarlsberg county. In 1848, the old Jarlsberg prosti was divided into two: Nordre Jarlsberg prosti and Søndre Jarlsberg prosti. A royal resolution on 19 May 1922, the deanery name was changed from "Søndre Jarlsberg prosti" to "Sør-Jarlsberg prosti". In 1948, the Diocese of Tunsberg was established and the old Sør-Jarlsberg prosti was renamed as Tønsberg domprosti, the seat of the new diocese. On 1 June 2007, the parish of Andebu was transferred from Tønsberg domprosti to Sandefjord prosti.

Municipality	Parish (sokn)	Church	Location	Year built	Photo
Tønsberg	Tønsberg domkirke	Tønsberg Cathedral	Tønsberg	1858	
Tønsberg	Tønsberg domkirke	Solvang Church	Tønsberg	1969	
Tønsberg	Fon	Fon Church	Fon	c. 1100	
Tønsberg	Ramnes	Ramnes Church	Ramnes	c. 1100	
Tønsberg	Sem	Sem Church	Jarlsberg farm	c. 1100	
Tønsberg	Sem	Vear Church	Vear	1993	
Tønsberg	Slagen	Slagen Church	Slagen, east of Eik	1901	
Tønsberg	Søndre Slagen	Husøy Church	Husøy	1933	
Tønsberg	Søndre Slagen	Søndre Slagen Church	Tønsberg	1972	
Tønsberg	Søndre Slagen	Vallø Church	Vallø	1782	
Tønsberg	Undrumsdal	Undrumsdal Church	Undrumsdal	1882	
Tønsberg	Vivestad	Vivestad Church	Vivestad	1914	
Tønsberg	Våle	Våle Church	Bergsåsen	c. 1100	
Færder	Hvasser	Hvasser Church	Hvasser	1903	
Færder	Nøtterøy	Nøtterøy Church	Borgheim	c. 1100	
Færder	Nøtterøy	Veierland Church	Veierland	1905	
Færder	Teie	Teie Church	Teie	1977	
Færder	Tjøme	Tjøme Church	Tjøme	1866	
Færder	Torød	Torød Church	Torød	1915	

== Drammen og Lier prosti ==
This deanery (Norwegian: prosti) covers the southeastern part of Buskerud county. It includes all the churches within Drammen Municipality and Lier Municipality. The deanery is headquartered at the Bragernes Church in the town of Drammen in Drammen Municipality.

In 1537, after the Reformation in Norway, Bragernes prosti was established as part of the Diocese of Christiania. It originally included the parishes of Aker, Asker, Bærum, Røyken, Hurum, Lier, Eiker, Modum, Sigdal, Flesberg, Rollag, Nore, Kongsberg, Sandsvær, Røyken, Hurum, Lier, and Bragernes–quite a large area. On 18 December 1739, the northwestern areas of the parish were separated to become the new Kongsberg prosti. This left the parishes of Aker, Asker, Bærum, Røyken, Hurum, Lier, and Bragernes in the Bragernes prosti. On 4 May 1819, the parish of Aker was moved to the Kristiania stiftprosti and the Bragernes prosti was renamed as Drammen prosti. In 1868, the parishes of Eiker, Modum, and Sigdal were transferred from Kongsberg prosti to Drammen prosti, and the parishes of Asker, Bærum, Lier, Røyken, and Hurum were transferred from Drammen prosti to Asker prosti. In 1941, the parishes of Lier, Røyken, and Hurum were transferred back to the Drammen prosti from Asker prosti. In 1971, the parishes of Nedre Eiker, Øvre Eiker, Modum, and Sigdal were transferred out of the Drammen prosti and moved to the new Eiker prosti. In 1999, the parishes of Lier, Røyken, and Hurum were transferred from Drammen prosti into the new Lier prosti. On 1 January 2020, Lier prosti was dissolved and the parishes of Lier Municipality were moved to Drammen prosti (the rest of Lier prosti was moved to Asker prosti which is part of the Diocese of Oslo). On 1 January 2022, the parishes of Strømsø and Tangen were merged to form Tangen og Strømsø parish. On 1 January 2023, the deanery was renamed Drammen og Lier prosti.

Municipality	Parish (sokn)	Church	Location	Year built	Photo
Drammen	Austad Fjell	Fjell Church	Fjell	1984	
Drammen	Bragernes	Bragernes Church	Bragernes	1871	
Drammen	Konnerud	Konnerud Church	Konnerud	1996	
Drammen	Konnerud	Old Konnerud Church	Konnerud	1858	
Drammen	Mjøndalen	Mjøndalen Church	Mjøndalen	1983	
Drammen	Nedre Eiker	Nedre Eiker Church	Krokstadelva	1860	
Drammen	Skoger	Skoger Church	Skoger	1886	
Drammen	Skoger	Old Skoger Church	Skoger	c. 1200	
Drammen	Strømsgodset	Strømsgodset Church	Strømsgodset	1843	
Drammen	Svelvik	Berger Church	Berger	1895	
Drammen	Svelvik	Svelvik Church	Svelvik	1859	
Drammen	Tangen og Strømsø	Strømsø Church	Strømsø	1667	
Drammen	Tangen og Strømsø	Tangen Church	Tangen	1854	
Drammen	Åssiden	Åssiden Church	Åssiden	1967	
Lier	Frogner	Frogner Church	Lierbyen	1694	
Lier	Frogner	Gullaug Church	Linnesstranda	1905	
Lier	Sjåstad	Sjåstad Church	Sjåstad	1896	
Lier	Sylling	Sylling Church	Sylling	1852	
Lier	Tranby og Lierskogen	Lierskogen Church	Lierskogen	1937	
Lier	Tranby og Lierskogen	Tranby Church	Tranby	1855	

== Eiker prosti ==
This deanery (Norwegian: prosti) covers the east-central part of Buskerud county. It includes all the churches within the municipalities of Krødsherad, Modum, Sigdal and Øvre Eiker. The deanery is headquartered at the Haug Church in the town of Hokksund in Øvre Eiker Municipality.

Eiker prosti was established in 1971 when it was separated from Drammen prosti. Initially, the new deanery included the parishes in Nedre Eiker, Øvre Eiker, Modum, Sigdal and Krødsherad. On 1 January 2020, Nedre Eiker became part of Drammen Municipality, so it was transferred into Drammen prosti.

Municipality	Parish (sokn)	Church	Location	Year built	Photo
Krødsherad	Krødsherad	Glesne Chapel	Krøderen	1908	
Krødsherad	Krødsherad	Olberg Church	Noresund	1859	
Krødsherad	Krødsherad	Veikåker Chapel	Veikåker	1934	
Modum	Modum	Gulsrud Church	Gulsrud	1931	
Modum	Modum	Heggen Church	Vikersund	c. 1200	
Modum	Modum	Nykirke Church	Nyhus	1847	
Modum	Modum	Rud Church	Drolsum	1917	
Modum	Modum	Snarum Church	Snarum	1869	
Modum	Modum	Vestre Spone Church	Vestre Spone	1880	
Modum	Modum	Åmot Church	Åmot	1996	
Sigdal	Eggedal	Eggedal Church	Eggedal	1878	
Sigdal	Sigdal	Holmen Church	Prestfoss	1853	
Sigdal	Sigdal	Solumsmoen Chapel	Solumsmoen	1893	
Sigdal	Sigdal	Vatnås Church	Vatnås	c. 1660	
Øvre Eiker	Bakke	Bakke Church	Skotselv	1883	
Øvre Eiker	Bakke	Bingen Chapel	Bingen	1924	
Øvre Eiker	Fiskum	Fiskum Church	Darbu	1866	
Øvre Eiker	Fiskum	Old Fiskum Church	Darbu	c. 1250	
Øvre Eiker	Haug	Haug Church	Hokksund	c. 1152	
Øvre Eiker	Vestfossen	Vestfossen Church	Vestfossen	2010	

== Hallingdal prosti ==
This deanery (Norwegian: prosti) covers the northern part of Buskerud county. It includes all the churches within the municipalities of Flå, Gol, Hemsedal, Hol, Nesbyen, and Ål. The deanery is headquartered at the Ål Church in the village of Ål in Ål Municipality.

Hallingdal prosti was established in 1914 when the old Ringerike og Hallingdal prosti was divided into Hallingdal prosti (to the northwest) and Ringerike prosti (to the southeast). On 1 January 2020, the parishes of Gol and Herad were merged to form the new Gol og Herad parish.

Municipality	Parish (sokn)	Church	Location	Year built	Photo
Flå	Flå	Flå Church	Flå	1858	
Gol	Gol og Herad	Gol Church	Gol	1882	
Gol	Gol og Herad	Herad Church	Herad	1882	
Hemsedal	Hemsedal	Hemsedal Church	Hemsedal	1882	
Hemsedal	Hemsedal	Lykkja Chapel	Lykkja	1961	
Hol	Dagali og Skurdalen	Dagali Church	Dagali	1850	
Hol	Dagali og Skurdalen	Skurdalen Church	Flatåker	1969	
Hol	Geilo	Geilo Culture Church	Geilo	2010	
Hol	Geilo	Ustedalen Chapel	Geilo	1890	
Hol	Hol og Hovet	Hol Church	Hol	1924	
Hol	Hol og Hovet	Old Hol Church	Hol	c. 1200	
Hol	Hol og Hovet	Hovet Church	Hovet	1910	
Nesbyen	Nesbyen	Nesbyen Church	Nesbyen	1862	
Ål	Leveld	Leveld Church	Leveld	1880	
Ål	Torpo	Torpo Church	Torpo	1880	
Ål	Torpo	Torpo Stave Church	Torpo	c. 1160	
Ål	Ål	Ål Church	Ål	1880	

== Kongsberg prosti ==
This deanery (Norwegian: prosti) covers the southwestern part of Buskerud county. It includes all the churches within the municipalities of Flesberg, Kongsberg, Rollag, and Nore og Uvdal. The deanery is headquartered at the Kongsberg Church in the town of Kongsberg in Kongsberg Municipality.

Kongsberg prosti was established on 18 December 1739 when the old Bragernes prosti was divided into two, with western parts of the deanery becoming the new Kongsberg prosti. Initially, the deanery included the parishes of Eiker, Modum, Sigdal, Sandsvær, Flesberg, Rollag, Nore og Uvdal, and Kongsberg. In 1867, Eiker, Modum, and Sigdal were transferred to the neighboring Bragernes prosti.

Municipality	Parish (sokn)	Church	Location	Year built	Photo
Flesberg	Flesberg	Flesberg Stave Church	Flesberg	c. 1100	
Flesberg	Lyngdal	Lyngdal Church	Lyngdal i Numedal	1701	
Flesberg	Svene	Svene Church	Svene	1738	
Kongsberg	Efteløt	Efteløt Church	Efteløt	c. 1184	
Kongsberg	Hedenstad	Hedenstad Church	Heistadmoen	c. 1100	
Kongsberg	Komnes	Komnes Church	Komnes	1881	
Kongsberg	Kongsberg og Jondalen	Kongsberg Church	Kongsberg	1761	
Kongsberg	Kongsberg og Jondalen	Jondalen Church	Jondalen	1882	
Kongsberg	Tuft	Tuft Church	Hvittingfoss	1880	
Rollag	Rollag	Rollag Stave Church	Rollag	c. 1200	
Rollag	Veggli	Veggli Church	Veggli	1859	
Nore og Uvdal	Nore	Nore Church	Nore	1880	
Nore og Uvdal	Nore	Nore Stave Church	Nore	c. 1100	
Nore og Uvdal	Nore	Skjønne Church	Rødberg	1879	
Nore og Uvdal	Tunhovd	Tunhovd Church	Tunhovd	1945	
Nore og Uvdal	Uvdal	Uvdal Church	Uvdal	1893	
Nore og Uvdal	Uvdal	Uvdal Stave Church	Uvdal	c. 1100	

== Larvik prosti ==
This deanery (Norwegian: prosti) covers the southwestern part of Vestfold county. It includes all the churches within Larvik Municipality. The deanery is headquartered at the Larvik Church in the town of Larvik in Larvik Municipality.

The deanery was established in 1671 and it included parishes in Larvik, Lardal, and Sandefjord. In 1999, the eastern areas of Sandefjord were separated to form the new Sandar prosti (later renamed Sandefjord prosti). In 2019, the three parishes of Svarstad, Styrvoll, and Hem were merged into one parish named Lardal. On 1 January 2024, the parishes of Kvelde and Hvarnes were merged into Kvelde og Hvarnes parish.

Municipality	Parish (sokn)	Church	Location	Year built	Photo
Larvik	Berg	Berg Arbeidskirke	Helgeroa	2007	
Larvik	Berg	Berg Church	Berg	1878	
Larvik	Berg	Old Berg Church	Berg	c. 1100	
Larvik	Hedrum	Hedrum Church	Hedrum	c. 1100	
Larvik	Kjose	Kjose Church	Kjose	1850	
Larvik	Kvelde og Hvarnes	Hvarnes Church	Hvarnes	1705	
Larvik	Kvelde og Hvarnes	Kvelde Church	Kvelde	1871	
Larvik	Lardal	Hem Church	Hem	c. 1100	
Larvik	Lardal	Styrvoll Church	Styrvoll	c. 1150	
Larvik	Lardal	Svarstad Church	Svarstad	1657	
Larvik	Larvik	Larvik Church	Larvik	1677	
Larvik	Larvik	Langestrand Church	Larvik	1818	
Larvik	Nanset	Nanset Church	Larvik	1974	
Larvik	Stavern	Fredriksvern Church	Stavern	1756	
Larvik	Tanum	Tanum Church	Tanum	c. 1100	
Larvik	Tjølling	Tjølling Church	Tjøllingvollen	c. 1100	
Larvik	Østre Halsen	Østre Halsen Church	Halsen in Larvik	1983	

== Nord-Jarlsberg prosti ==
This deanery (Norwegian: prosti) covers the northern part of Vestfold county. It includes all the churches within Holmestrand Municipality and Horten Municipality. The deanery is headquartered at the Horten Church in the town of Horten in Horten Municipality.

The deanery was established in 1848 when the old Jarlsberg prosti was divided into Nordre Jarlsberg prosti and Søndre Jarlsberg prosti. A royal resolution on 19 May 1922, the deanery name was changed from "Nordre Jarlsberg prosti" to "Nord-Jarlsberg prosti". On 1 January 2018, the three parishes of Botne, Hillestad, and Holmestrand were merged to form the new Botne parish.

Municipality	Parish (sokn)	Church	Location	Year built	Photo
Holmestrand	Botne	Botne Church	Botne	c. 1200	
Holmestrand	Botne	Hillestad Church	Hillestad	1724	
Holmestrand	Botne	Holmestrand Church	Holmestrand	1675	
Holmestrand	Hof, Vassås og Eidsfoss	Eidsfoss Church	Eidsfoss	1904	
Holmestrand	Hof, Vassås og Eidsfoss	Hof Church	Hof	c. 1150	
Holmestrand	Hof, Vassås og Eidsfoss	Vassås Church	Vassås	c. 1200	
Holmestrand	Sande	Sande Church	Sande i Vestfold	1093	
Horten	Borre	Borre Church	Borre	c. 1100	
Horten	Borre	Skoppum Church	Skoppum	1989	
Horten	Horten	Horten Church	Horten	1855	
Horten	Horten	Løvøy Chapel	Løvøya	c. 1200	
Horten	Horten	Sentrum Church	Horten	1972	
Horten	Nykirke	Nykirke Church	Nykirke	c. 1100	
Horten	Åsgårdstrand	Åsgårdstrand Church	Åsgårdstrand	1969	

== Ringerike prosti ==
This deanery (Norwegian: prosti) covers the northeastern part of Buskerud county and the far northwestern part of Akershus county. It includes all the churches within the municipalities of Hole and Ringerike in Buskerud county and Jevnaker Municipality in Akershus county. The deanery is headquartered at the Hønefoss Church in the town of Hønefoss in Ringerike Municipality.

Ringerike prosti was established in 1914 when the old Ringerike og Hallingdal prosti was divided into Hallingdal prosti (to the northwest) and Ringerike prosti (to the southeast). Originally, the deanery was headquartered at Norderhov Church, but in 1990 it was moved to Hønefoss Church. On 1 January 2022, the parish of Jevnaker was moved from the Diocese of Hamar to the Diocese of Tunsberg and it became part of Ringerike prosti (since Jevnaker was moved from Oppland county to Viken county.

Municipality	Parish (sokn)	Church	Location	Year built	Photo
Hole	Hole	Bønsnes Church	Bønsnes	c. 1100	
Hole	Hole	Hole Church	Helgelandsmoen	c. 1200	
Hole	Hole	Sollihøgda Chapel	Sollihøgda	1911	
Jevnaker	Jevnaker	Jevnaker Church	Prestmoen	1834	
Jevnaker	Jevnaker	Randsfjord Church	Jevnaker	1916	
Ringerike	Haug	Haug Church	Haugsbygd	c. 1200	
Ringerike	Hval	Hval Church	Hallingby	1862	
Ringerike	Hønefoss	Hønefoss Church	Hønefoss	2017	
Ringerike	Lunder	Lunder Church	Sokna	1761	
Ringerike	Lunder	Strømsoddbygda Chapel	Strømsoddbygda	1953	
Ringerike	Nes	Nes Church	Nes	1858	
Ringerike	Norderhov og Ask	Norderhov Church	Norderhov	c. 1170	
Ringerike	Norderhov og Ask	Ask Chapel	Ask	1936	
Ringerike	Tyristrand	Tyristrand Church	Tyristrand	1857	
Ringerike	Ullerål	Ullerål Church	Hønefoss	2004	
Ringerike	Veme	Veme Church	Veme	1893	
Ringerike	Viker	Viker Church	Viker	1697	

== Sandefjord prosti ==
This deanery (Norwegian: prosti) covers the southeastern part of Vestfold county. It includes all the churches within Sandefjord Municipality. The deanery is headquartered at the Sandefjord Church in the town of Sandefjord in Sandefjord Municipality.

The deanery was established on 1 March 1999 as Sandar prosti when it was separated from Larvik prosti. It originally included the parishes of Sandar and Sandefjord. On 1 July 2006, the name of the deanery was changed from "Sandar prosti" to "Sandefjord prosti". On 1 January 2007, the parish of Andebu was transferred from Tønsberg domprosti to Sandefjord prosti. On 1 January 2017, the parish of Stokke was transferred from Tønsberg domprosti to Sandefjord prosti.

Municipality	Parish (sokn)	Church	Location	Year built	Photo
Sandefjord	Andebu	Andebu Church	Andebu	c. 1100	
Sandefjord	Arnadal	Arnadal Church	Fossnes	1882	
Sandefjord	Bugården	Bugården Church	Sandefjord	1980	
Sandefjord	Høyjord	Høyjord Stave Church	Høyjord	c. 1100	
Sandefjord	Kodal	Kodal Church	Kodal	c. 1100	
Sandefjord	Sandar	Sandar Church	Sandefjord	1792	
Sandefjord	Sandefjord	Sandefjord Church	Sandefjord	1903	
Sandefjord	Skjee	Skjee Church	Skjee	c. 1100	
Sandefjord	Stokke	Stokke Church	Stokke	1886	
Sandefjord	Vesterøy	Vesterøy Church	Vesterøya	1967	
