= Østre Halsen Church =

Church in Vestfold, Norway

- Østre Halsen kirke
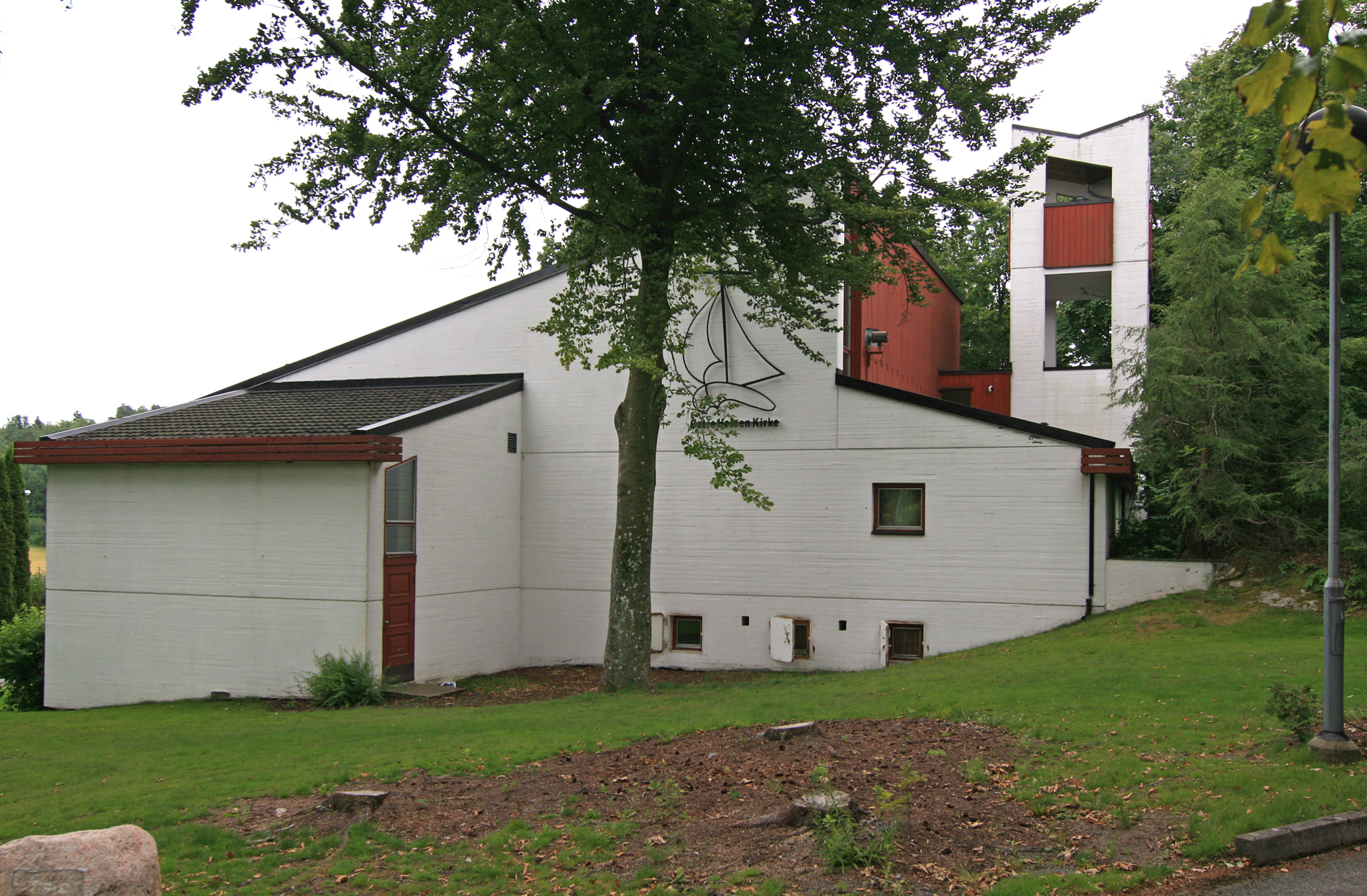
- View of the church
- Østre Halsen Church
- 59°02′14″N 10°04′13″E
- Location: Larvik Municipality, Vestfold
- Country: Norway
- Denomination: Church of Norway
- Churchmanship: Evangelical Lutheran

History
- Status: Parish church
- Founded: 1878
- Consecrated: 20 March 1983

Architecture
- Functional status: Active
- Architect: Roar Tollnes
- Architectural type: Rectangular
- Completed: 1983 (43 years ago)

Specifications
- Capacity: 330
- Materials: Concrete

Administration
- Diocese: Tunsberg
- Deanery: Larvik prosti
- Parish: Østre Halsen

Østre Halsen Church (Norwegian: Østre Halsen kirke) is a parish church of the Church of Norway in Larvik Municipality in Vestfold county, Norway. It is located in the eastern Halsen area of the town of Larvik. It is the church for the Østre Halsen parish which is part of the Larvik prosti (deanery) in the Diocese of Tunsberg. The white and red concrete church was built in a rectangular design in 1983 using plans drawn up by the architect Roar Tollnes. The church seats about Roar Tollnespeople.

== History ==
A prayer house at Halsen was first opened in 1878. In 1899, the prayer house was consecrated as an interim church until a proper church could be funded and built. In 1975, plans were finally made for the construction of a new church. The new building was designed by Roar Tollnes. It was decided to build the basic parts of the building and to consecrate that as an annex chapel first. This stage was completed on 20 March 1983. In 1987, Østre Halsen became its own parish and thus the chapel became a full parish church. In 1993, the second stage of construction took place, enlarging the building to make it a complete church. The building now has room for a number of other activities besides just church services.

== See also ==
- List of churches in Tunsberg
