= Gulsrud Church =

Church in Buskerud, Norway

- Gulsrud kirke
- View of the church
- Gulsrud Church
- 60°00′53″N 10°07′31″E
- Location: Modum, Buskerud
- Country: Norway
- Denomination: Church of Norway
- Churchmanship: Evangelical Lutheran

History
- Status: Parish church
- Founded: 1907
- Consecrated: 25 Nov 1931

Architecture
- Functional status: Active
- Architect: Sverre Poulsen
- Architectural type: Long church
- Completed: 1931 (95 years ago)

Specifications
- Capacity: 150
- Materials: Wood

Administration
- Diocese: Tunsberg
- Deanery: Eiker prosti
- Parish: Modum
- Norwegian Cultural Heritage Site
- Type: Church
- Status: Not protected
- ID: 84449

Gulsrud Church (Norwegian: Gulsrud kirke) is a parish church of the Church of Norway in Modum Municipality in Buskerud county, Norway. It is located in the village of Gulsrud. It is one of the churches for the Modum parish which is part of the Eiker prosti (deanery) in the Diocese of Tunsberg. The white, wooden church was built in a long church design in 18 using plans drawn up by the architect Sverre Poulsen. The church seats about 150 people.

== History ==
A prayer chapel based on drawings by Hans Horn was built for the Gulsrud Women's Association in 1907. It was consecrated on 18 September 1907. This chapel burned down in 1930. Soon afterwards, a new church building was designed by Sverre Poulsen. The new wooden long church had approximately the same floor area as the old chapel and it was consecrated on 25 November 1931. The building was previously titled "Gulsrud Chapel", but is now called Gulsrud Church.

== Media gallery ==
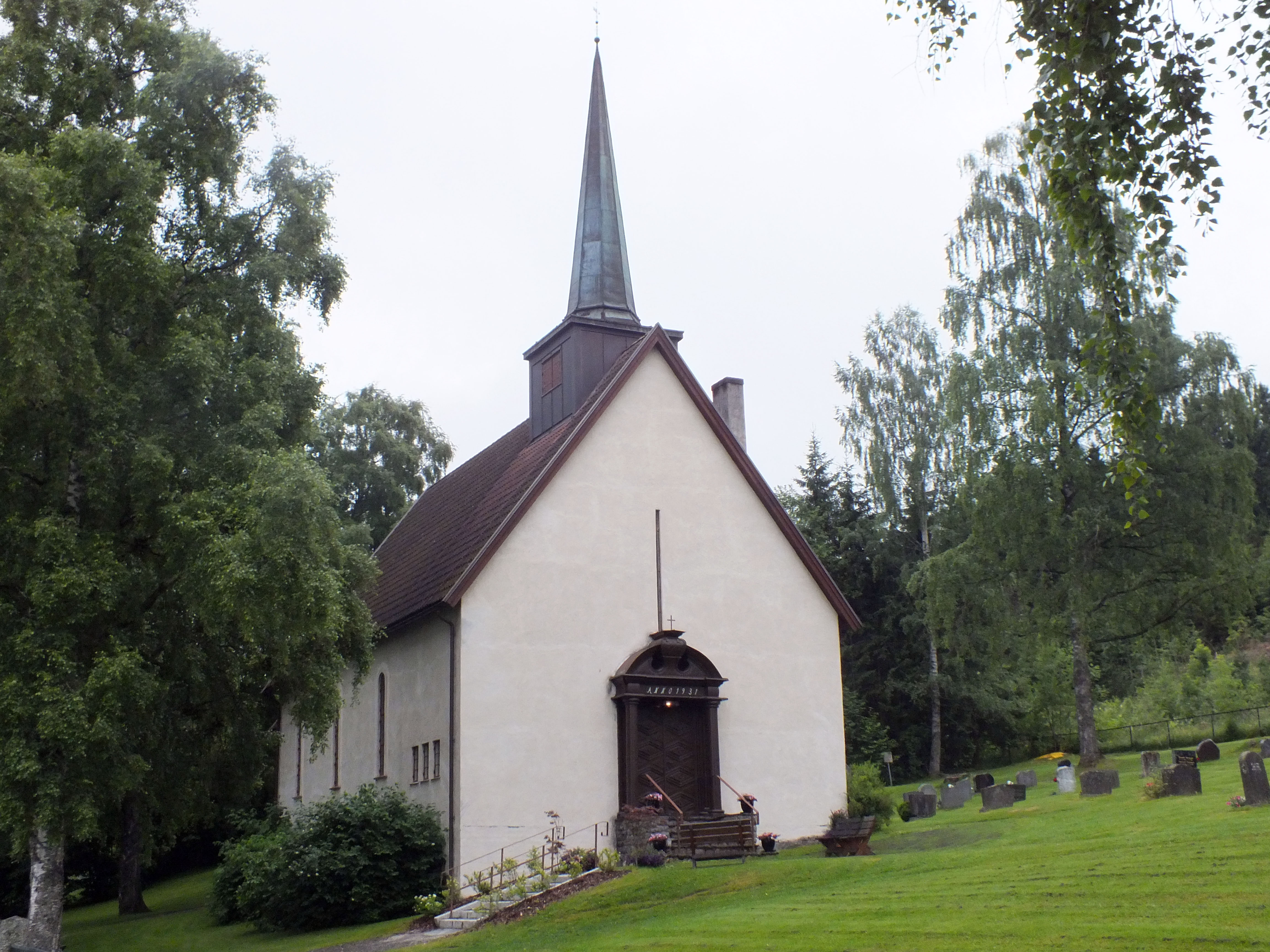

== See also ==
- List of churches in Tunsberg
