= Solumsmoen Chapel =

Church in Buskerud, Norway

- Solumsmoen kapell
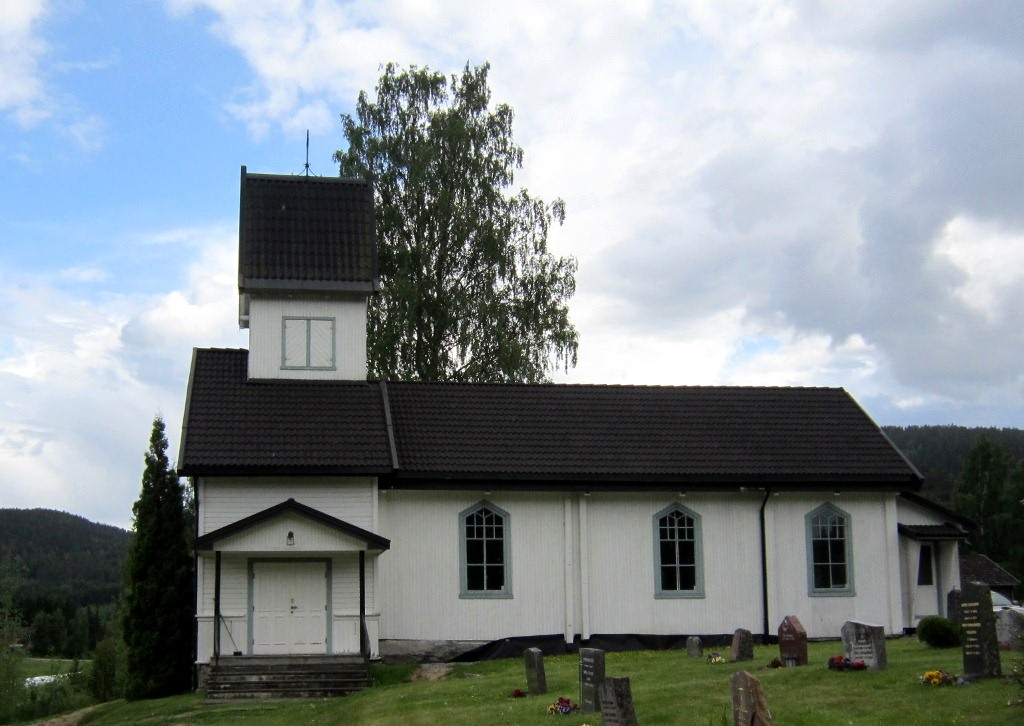
- View of the church
- Solumsmoen Chapel
- 59°57′48″N 9°46′14″E
- Location: Sigdal, Buskerud
- Country: Norway
- Denomination: Church of Norway
- Churchmanship: Evangelical Lutheran

History
- Status: Parish church
- Founded: 1906
- Consecrated: 3 Aug 1906

Architecture
- Functional status: Active
- Architect: Hans Horn
- Architectural type: Long church
- Completed: 1906 (120 years ago)

Specifications
- Capacity: 90
- Materials: Wood

Administration
- Diocese: Tunsberg
- Deanery: Eiker prosti
- Parish: Sigdal

Solumsmoen Chapel (Norwegian: Solumsmoen kapell) is a parish church of the Church of Norway in Sigdal Municipality in Buskerud county, Norway. It is located in the village of Solumsmoen. It is one of the churches for the Sigdal parish which is part of the Eiker prosti (deanery) in the Diocese of Tunsberg. The white, wooden church was built in a long church design in 1906 using plans drawn up by the architect Hans Horn. The church seats about 90 people.

== History ==
The building that makes up present-day Solumsmoen Chapel was originally built in 1893. It is said that it was first a general store with a bakery in the basement, before it became a house of prayer. In 1906, the building was rebuilt according to drawings by Hans Horn to become a chapel. At the same time the building was enlarged by adding a choir and sacristy plus a bell-tower on the roof. The newly rebuilt chapel was consecrated on 3 August 1906. The building was renovated in 1973–1974.

== See also ==
- List of churches in Tunsberg
