= Bingen Chapel =

Church in Buskerud, Norway

- Bingen kapell
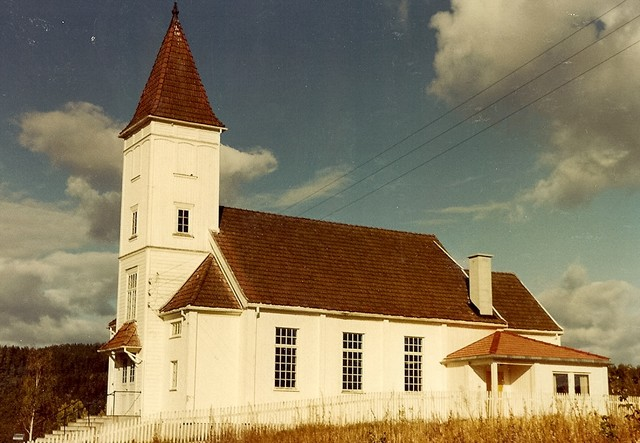
- View of the church
- Bingen Chapel
- 59°53′20″N 9°46′08″E
- Location: Øvre Eiker, Buskerud
- Country: Norway
- Denomination: Church of Norway
- Churchmanship: Evangelical Lutheran

History
- Status: Parish church
- Founded: 1924
- Consecrated: 22 Oct 1924

Architecture
- Functional status: Active
- Architect: Alfred Christian Dahl
- Architectural type: Long church
- Completed: 1924 (102 years ago)

Specifications
- Capacity: 100
- Materials: Wood

Administration
- Diocese: Tunsberg
- Deanery: Eiker prosti
- Parish: Bakke
- Norwegian Cultural Heritage Site
- Type: Church
- Status: Not protected
- ID: 83886

Bingen Chapel (Norwegian: Bingen kapell) is a parish church of the Church of Norway in Øvre Eiker Municipality in Buskerud county, Norway. It is located in the village of Bingen. It is one of the churches for the Bakke parish which is part of the Eiker prosti (deanery) in the Diocese of Tunsberg. The white, wooden church was built in a long church design in 1924 using plans drawn up by the architect Alfred Christian Dahl. The church seats about 100 people.

== History ==
View of the chapel

The chapel was consecrated on 22 October 1924. The wooden long church was designed by Alfred Christian Dahl. Most of the church was log construction, but the west tower is timber-framed. The nave and choir are rectangular and the choir is surrounded by sacristies.

== See also ==
- List of churches in Tunsberg
