= Lykkja Chapel =

Church in Buskerud, Norway

- Lykkja kapell
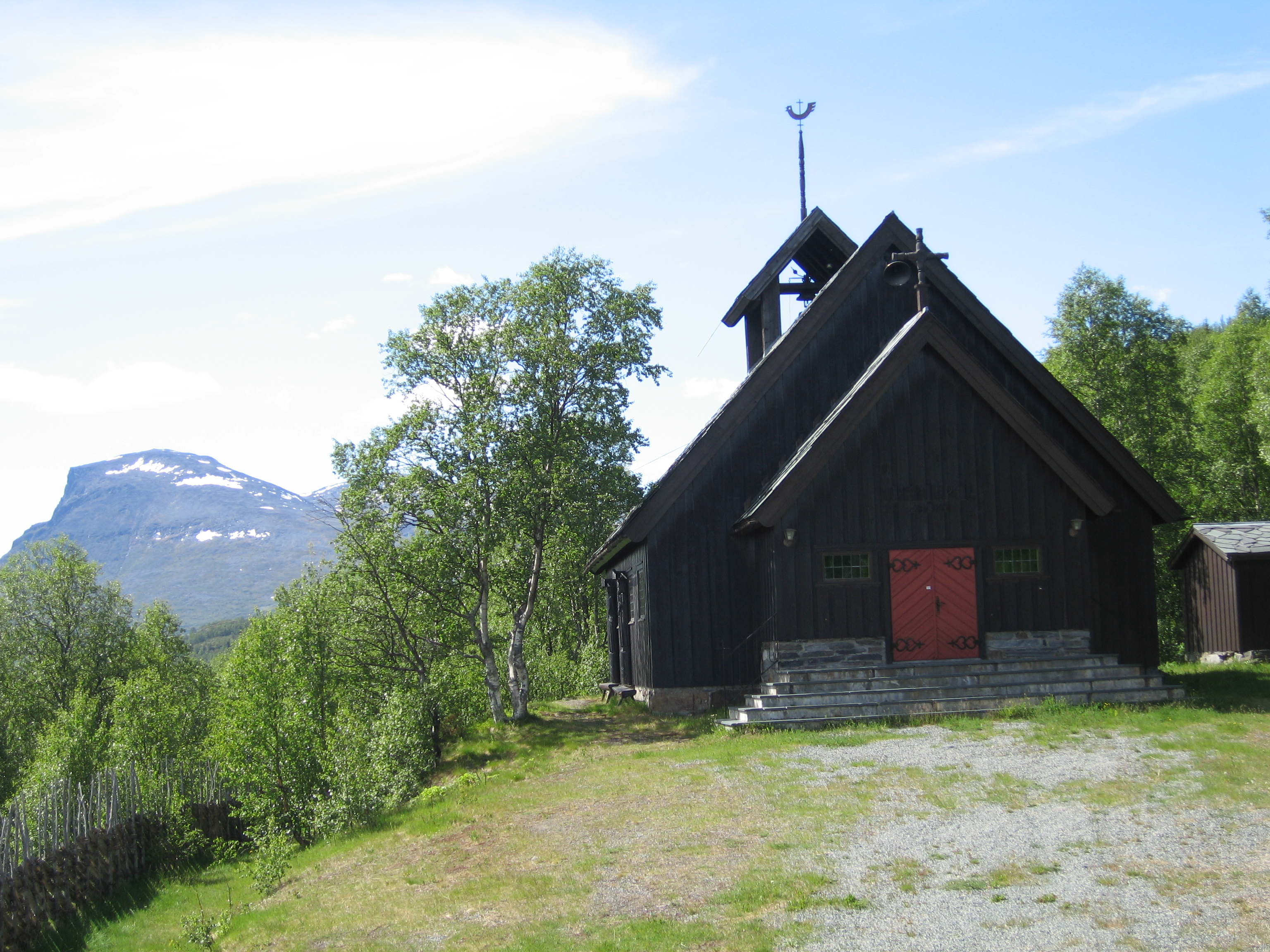
- View of the church
- Lykkja Chapel
- 60°53′01″N 8°50′27″E
- Location: Hemsedal, Buskerud
- Country: Norway
- Denomination: Church of Norway
- Churchmanship: Evangelical Lutheran

History
- Status: Parish church
- Founded: 1961
- Consecrated: 20 Aug 1961

Architecture
- Functional status: Active
- Architect: Trygve M. Davidsen
- Architectural type: Long church
- Completed: 1961 (65 years ago)

Specifications
- Capacity: 150
- Materials: Wood

Administration
- Diocese: Tunsberg
- Deanery: Hallingdal prosti
- Parish: Hemsedal
- Norwegian Cultural Heritage Site
- Type: Church
- Status: Not protected
- ID: 84347

Lykkja Chapel (Norwegian: Lykkja kapell) is a parish church of the Church of Norway in Hemsedal Municipality in Buskerud county, Norway. It is located in the village of Lykkja. It is one of the churches for the Hemsedal parish which is part of the Hallingdal prosti (deanery) in the Diocese of Tunsberg. The brown, wooden church was built in a long church design in 1961 using plans drawn up by the architect Trygve M. Davidsen. The church seats about 150 people.

== History ==
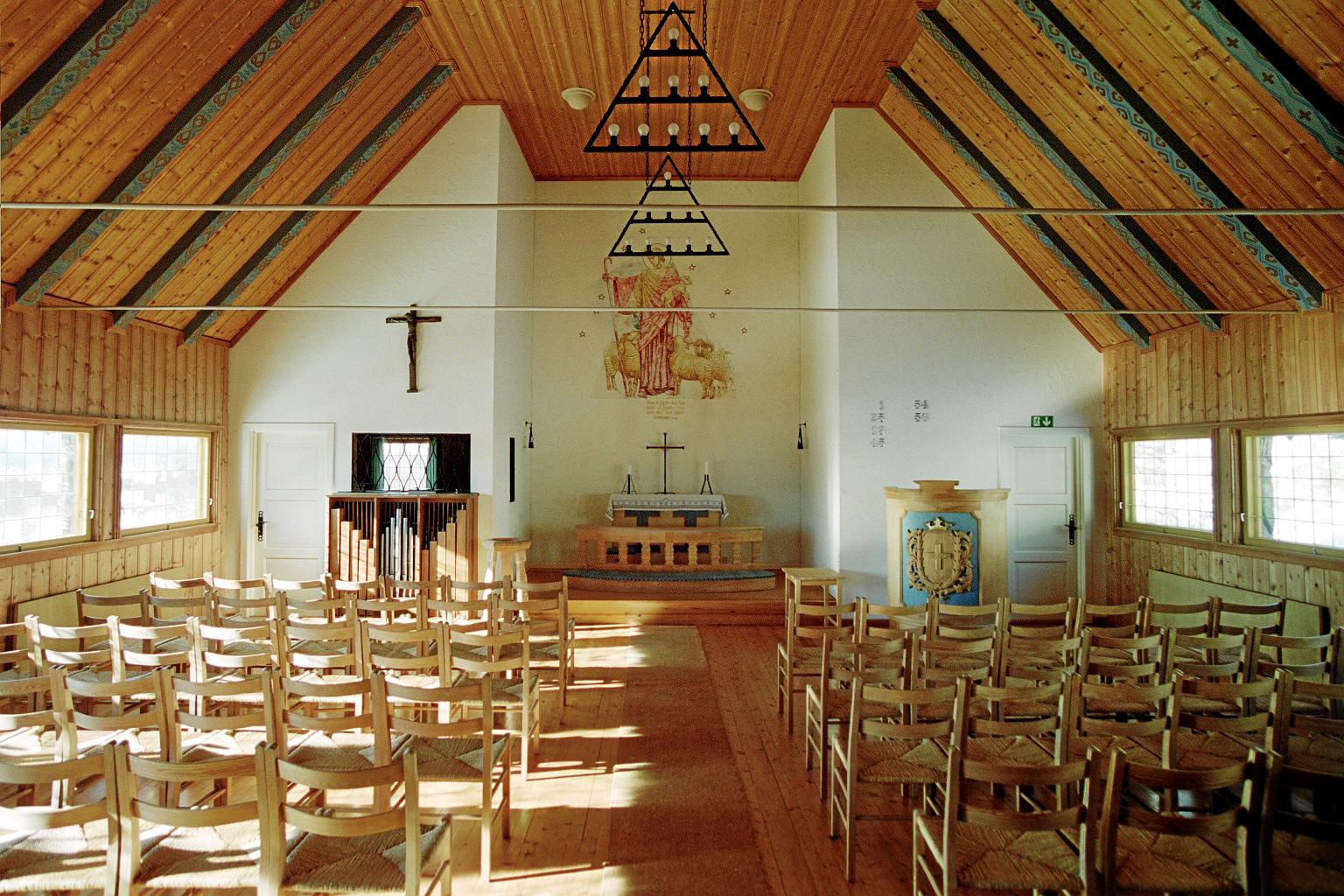
Interior view of the church

Lykkja Chapel is located on the north side of Tisleifjorden at an altitude of around 900 metres (3,000 ft). The chapel was designed by Trygve M. Davidsen and it was built in 1960–1961. It has a long church design and it was consecrated on 20 August 1961.

== See also ==
- List of churches in Tunsberg
