= Veikåker Chapel =

Church in Buskerud, Norway

- Veikåker kapell
- View of the church
- Veikåker Chapel
- 60°15′20″N 9°39′05″E
- Location: Krødsherad, Buskerud
- Country: Norway
- Denomination: Church of Norway
- Churchmanship: Evangelical Lutheran

History
- Status: Parish church
- Founded: 1934
- Consecrated: 28 Sept 1934

Architecture
- Functional status: Active
- Architect: Sigurd Trøim
- Architectural type: Long church
- Completed: 1934 (92 years ago)

Specifications
- Capacity: 150
- Materials: Wood

Administration
- Diocese: Tunsberg
- Deanery: Eiker prosti
- Parish: Krødsherad
- Norwegian Cultural Heritage Site
- Type: Church
- Status: Not protected
- ID: 85796

Veikåker Chapel (Norwegian: Veikåker kapell) is a parish church of the Church of Norway in Krødsherad Municipality in Buskerud county, Norway. It is located in the village of Veikåker. It is one of the churches for the Krødsherad parish which is part of the Eiker prosti (deanery) in the Diocese of Tunsberg. The red, wooden church was built in a long church design in 1934 using plans drawn up by the architect Sigurd Trøim. The church seats about 150 people.

== History ==
There had been plans to build a chapel in the northern part of Krødsherad Municipality for some time when farmer Thor Wegager donated land for the chapel at Stavenesodden in 1919. A cemetery was inaugurated here in 1928, and finally in 1933 governmental permission was given to build a chapel on the site. The new building was designed by Sigurd Trøim and consecrated on 28 September 1934. The chapel is a timber-framed long church. The chapel has a choir that is the full width of the nave. There is also a small sacristy on the eastern side of the choir.

== Media gallery ==
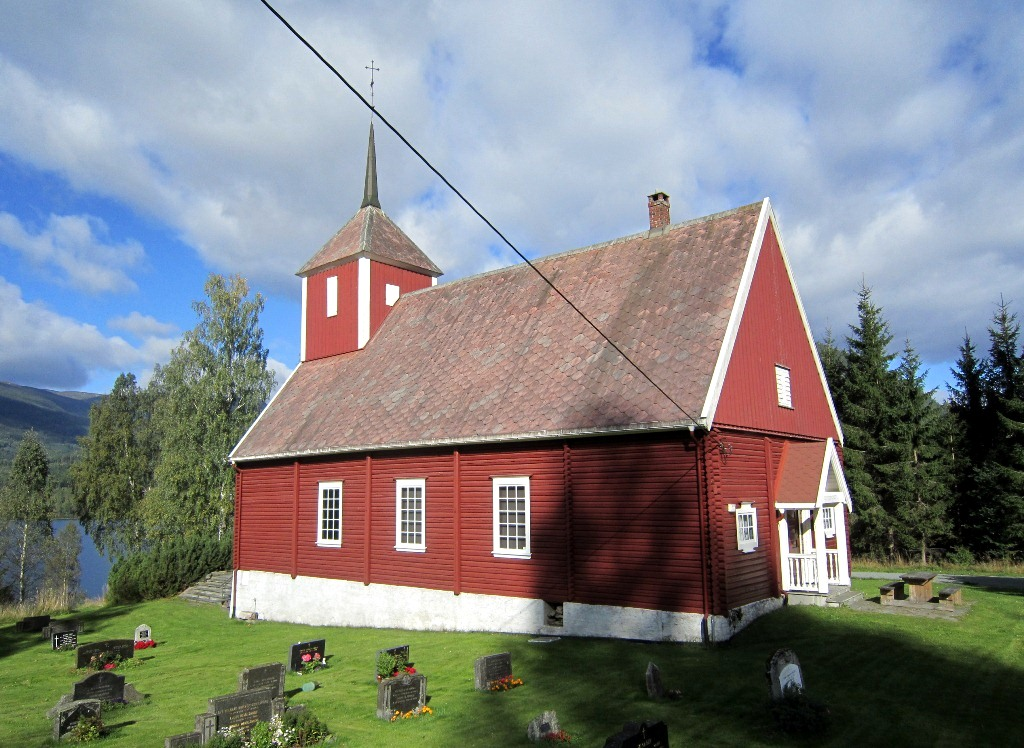

== See also ==
- List of churches in Tunsberg
