= Haug Church (Ringerike) =

Church in Buskerud, Norway

- Haug kirke
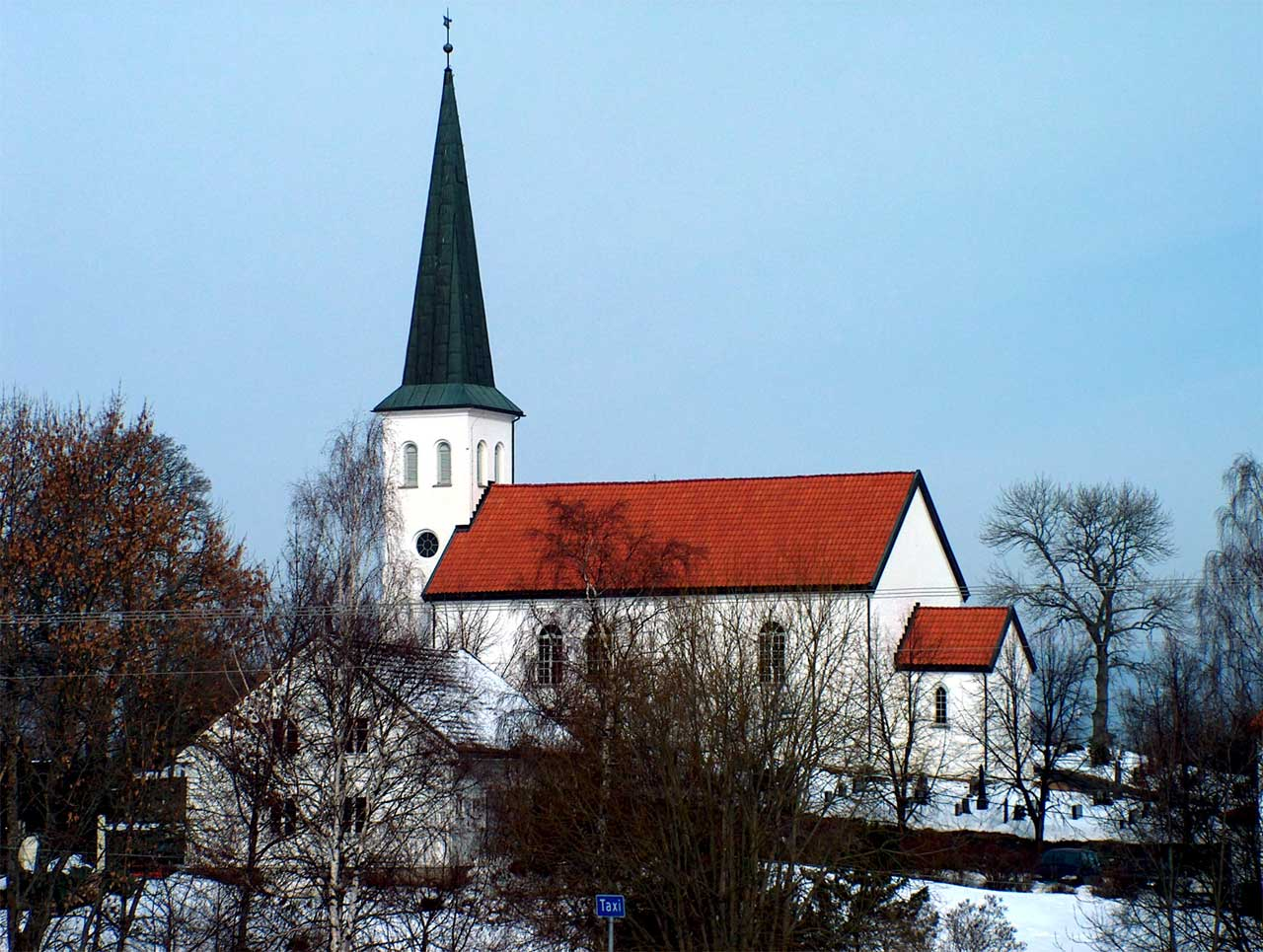
- View of the church
- Haug Church
- 60°10′27″N 10°19′12″E
- Location: Ringerike, Buskerud
- Country: Norway
- Denomination: Church of Norway
- Previous denomination: Catholic Church
- Churchmanship: Evangelical Lutheran

History
- Status: Parish church
- Founded: c. 1200
- Consecrated: c. 1200

Architecture
- Functional status: Active
- Architectural type: Long church
- Completed: c. 1200 (826 years ago)

Specifications
- Capacity: 250
- Materials: Stone

Administration
- Diocese: Tunsberg
- Deanery: Ringerike prosti
- Parish: Haug
- Norwegian Cultural Heritage Site
- Type: Church
- Status: Automatically protected
- ID: 84496

Haug Church (Norwegian: Haug kirke) is a parish church of the Church of Norway in Ringerike Municipality in Buskerud county, Norway. It is located in the village of Haugsbygd. It is the church for the Haug parish which is part of the Ringerike prosti (deanery) in the Diocese of Tunsberg. The white, stone church was built in a long church design around the year 1200. The church seats about 250 people.

== History ==
The earliest existing historical records of the church date back to the year 1358, but the church was not built that year. The stone long church was likely built in the first half of the 13th century and it was originally smaller. In the 17th century it was described as dilapidated and full of cracks. In 1712 the church was renovated and rebuilt. The nave walls were repaired and the old choir was demolished. The church was enlarged to the east and a new choir the same width as the nave was built on the east end of the nave. In 1878 there was another major reconstruction. Large parts of the medieval nave in the western part of the church were demolished. New walls were erected on the remains of the old long walls, the church was given a new west tower, and the chancel was extended further east. It was given a sacristy addition on the same occasion. In 1962–63 there was an extensive restoration by Bjarne Hvoslef.

== See also ==
- List of churches in Tunsberg
