= Bønsnes Church =

Church in Buskerud, Norway

- Bønsnes kirke
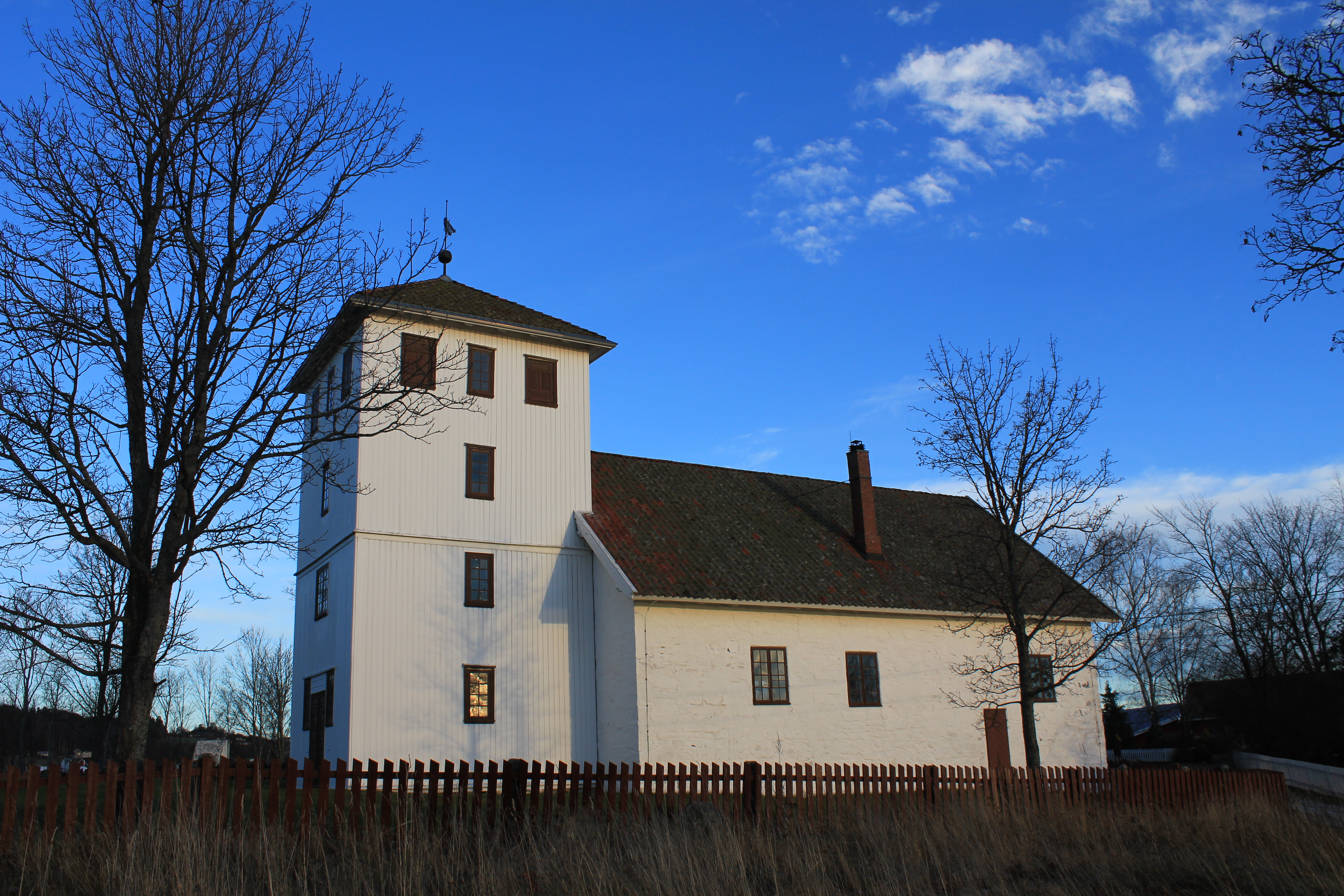
- View of the church
- Bønsnes Church
- 60°03′37″N 10°11′45″E
- Location: Hole, Buskerud
- Country: Norway
- Denomination: Church of Norway
- Previous denomination: Catholic Church
- Churchmanship: Evangelical Lutheran

History
- Status: Parish church
- Founded: c. 12th century
- Consecrated: c. 12th century

Architecture
- Functional status: Active
- Architectural type: Long church
- Completed: c. 1100 (926 years ago)

Specifications
- Capacity: 80
- Materials: Stone

Administration
- Diocese: Tunsberg
- Deanery: Ringerike prosti
- Parish: Hole
- Norwegian Cultural Heritage Site
- Type: Church
- Status: Automatically protected
- ID: 83999

Bønsnes Church (Norwegian: Bønsnes kirke) is a parish church of the Church of Norway in Hole Municipality in Buskerud county, Norway. It is located in the village of Bønsnes. It is one of the churches for the Hole parish which is part of the Ringerike prosti (deanery) in the Diocese of Tunsberg. The white, stone church was built in a long church design during the 12th century. The church seats about 80 people.

== History ==
The church was probably built during the 12th century. King Olav Haraldsson, who was canonized after his death in 1030, grew up on Bønsnes. Legend says that the church was built on his initiative, but historians do not agree on the exact date of the church's construction with dates ranging from the 11th century until after the year 1300. The stone long church has a rectangular nave and chancel in the same room. The plastered walls are around 130 centimetres (51 in) thick and consist predominantly of various types of sandstone.

The medieval church is said to have been in very poor condition by the 16th century (it may have burned down after being struck by lightning). In any case, it fell into disrepair and it was taken out of use. The church stood abandoned for most of the 1500s and 1600s. Around the years 1676–1680, the church began to be restored so that services could once again be held in the church. Most churches in Norway were sold into private ownership during the Norwegian church sale in 1723 to help the King pay off war debts, but unusually, this church was not part of the sale. It is said that the tenants of the neighboring farms considered it their property, so it was not included in the sale in addition to the fact that the church had not been used for a long time. By around 1727, the church had been repaired and was brought back into use. The current west tower, which is not the first, is believed to have been built in connection with repair work in the 1850s and 1860s.

== See also ==
- List of churches in Tunsberg
