= Herad Church (Buskerud) =

Church in Buskerud, Norway

- Herad kyrkje
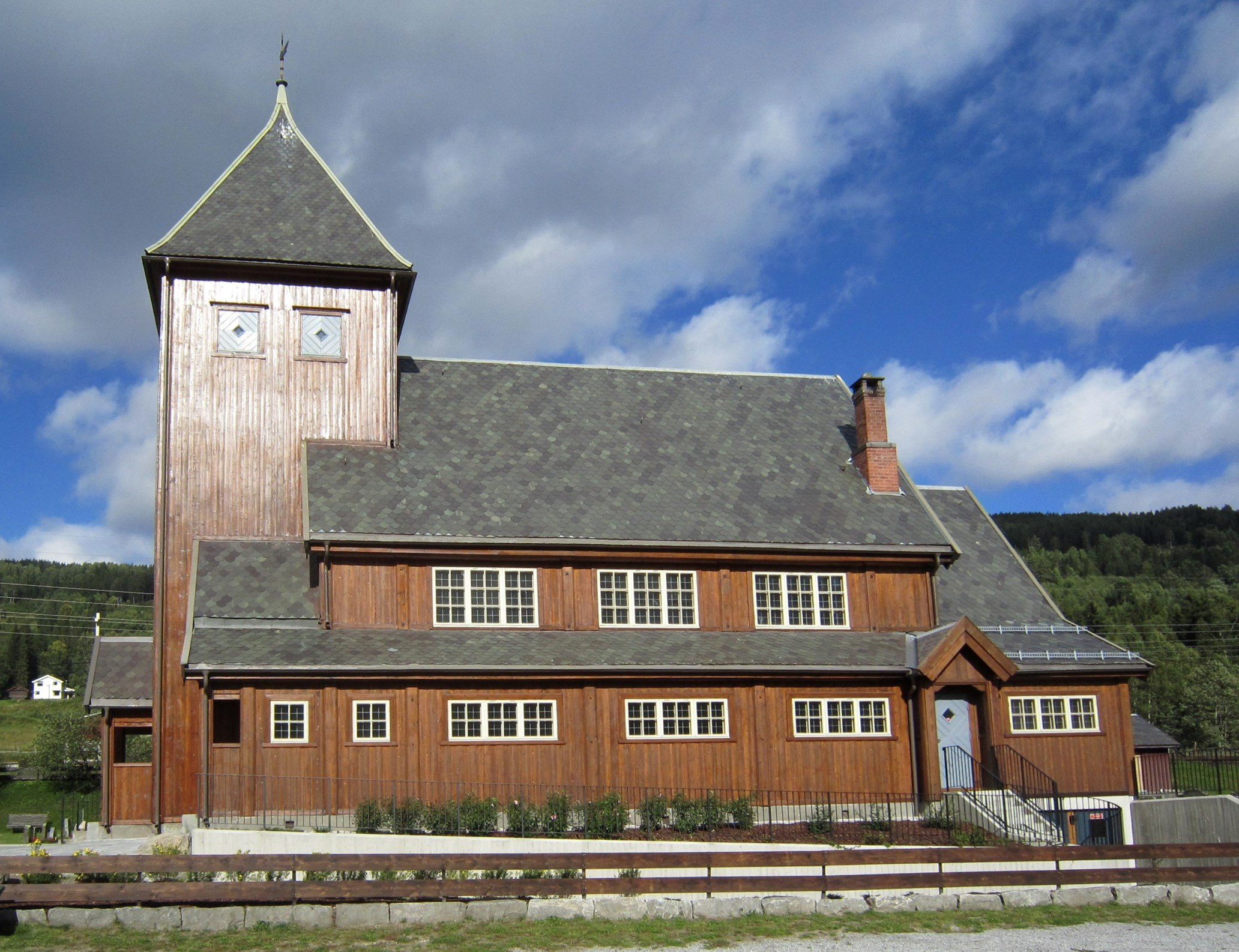
- View of the church
- Herad Church
- 60°41′59″N 9°00′38″E
- Location: Gol Municipality, Buskerud
- Country: Norway
- Denomination: Church of Norway
- Churchmanship: Evangelical Lutheran

History
- Status: Parish church
- Founded: 1934
- Consecrated: 30 Sept 1934

Architecture
- Functional status: Active
- Architect: Ola Steen
- Architectural type: Long church
- Completed: 1934 (92 years ago)

Specifications
- Capacity: 200
- Materials: Wood

Administration
- Diocese: Tunsberg
- Deanery: Hallingdal prosti
- Parish: Gol og Herad
- Norwegian Cultural Heritage Site
- Type: Church
- Status: Not protected
- ID: 84554

Herad Church (Nynorsk: Herad kyrkje) is a parish church of the Church of Norway in Gol Municipality in Buskerud county, Norway. It is located in the village of Herad. It is one of the churches for the Gol og Herad parish which is part of the Hallingdal prosti (deanery) in the Diocese of Tunsberg. The brown, wooden church was built in a long church design in 1934 using plans drawn up by the architect Ola Steen. The church seats about 200 people.

== History ==
Hopes for a church in Herad began in the 1870s. In 1912, the architect Ole Steen made plans for the church, but it was not until 1932 before work began on the new church. The builder was Johan Jensen who built it on land from the Hoftun farm. The new church and surrounding cemetery was consecrated on 30 September 1934. It is a timber-framed long church. The exterior of the church is inspired by the designs of the historic stave churches. The church was renovated and stained externally in 2008–2009.

== See also ==
- List of churches in Tunsberg
