= Snarum Church =

Church in Buskerud, Norway

- Snarum kirke
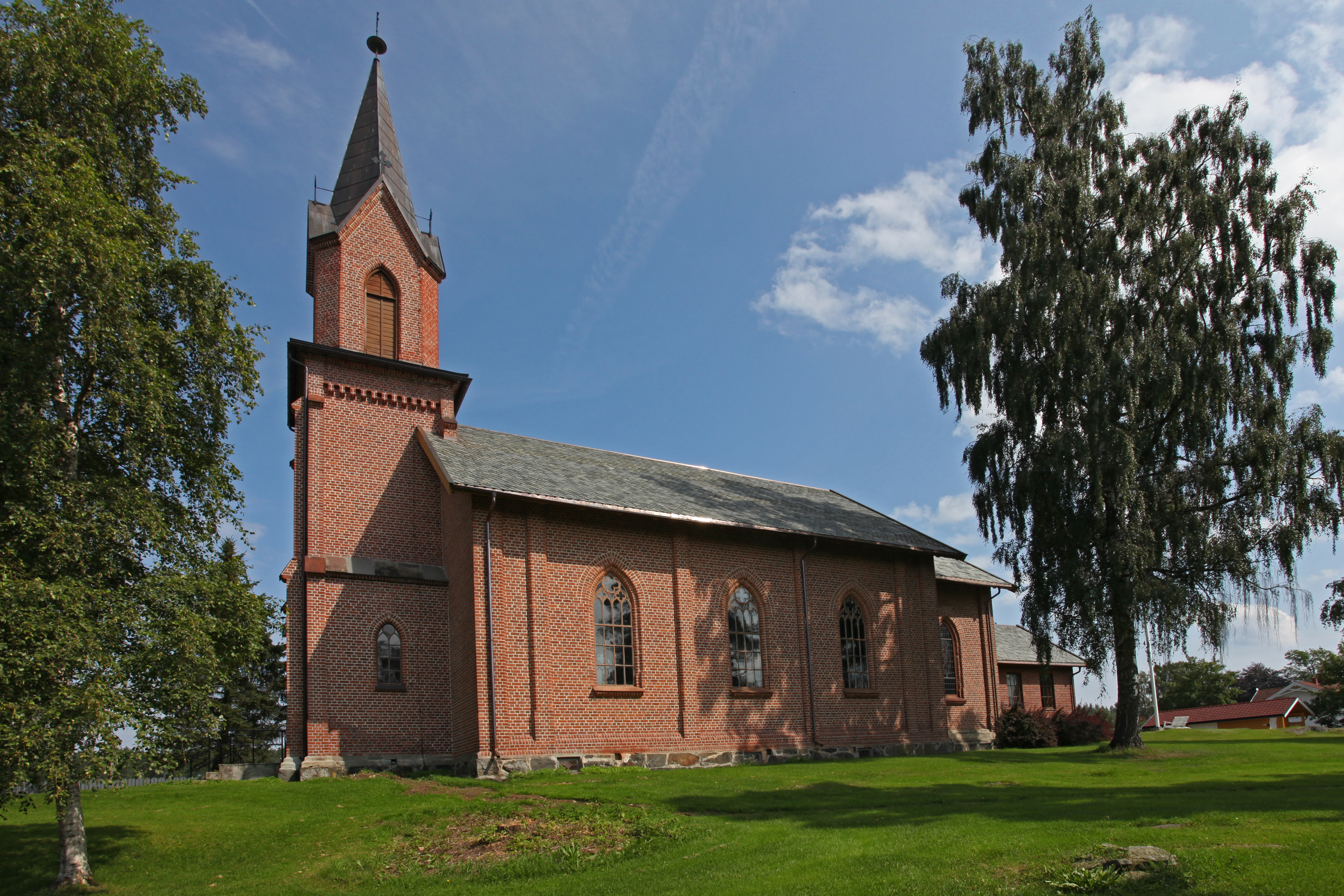
- View of the church
- Snarum Church
- 60°01′31″N 9°52′06″E
- Location: Modum Municipality, Buskerud
- Country: Norway
- Denomination: Church of Norway
- Previous denomination: Catholic Church
- Churchmanship: Evangelical Lutheran

History
- Status: Parish church
- Founded: c. 13th century
- Consecrated: 21 Oct 1869

Architecture
- Functional status: Active
- Architect: Georg Andreas Bull
- Architectural type: Long church
- Completed: 1869 (157 years ago)

Specifications
- Capacity: 228
- Materials: Brick

Administration
- Diocese: Tunsberg
- Deanery: Eiker prosti
- Parish: Modum
- Norwegian Cultural Heritage Site
- Type: Church
- Status: Listed
- ID: 85503

Snarum Church (Norwegian: Snarum kirke) is a parish church of the Church of Norway in Modum Municipality in Buskerud county, Norway. It is located in the village of Snarum. It is one of the churches for the Modum parish which is part of the Eiker prosti (deanery) in the Diocese of Tunsberg. The red brick church was built in a long church design in 1869 using plans drawn up by the architect Georg Andreas Bull. The church seats about 228 people.

== History ==
The earliest existing historical records of the church date back to the year 1466, but the church was not built that year. The first church on this site was a stave church that was possibly built in the 13th century. In 1663, the stave church was eventually reduced in size by tearing down the old nave, and then it was expanded to a cruciform design by adding three transepts to the remaining choir from the old church.

In 1702, the stave church was torn down and replaced by a wooden cruciform church. Some of the wall boards from the stave church are said to have been reused in the floor of the new building. The church appears to have had four equally long transepts with a central tower with a spire. There was an church porch in the west and a sacristy in the east. By the 1860s, the church was in need of replacement, so a new church was built across the road to the south.

The third church building on this site was built in 1869. The new church is a neo-Gothic brick church that was designed by Georg Andreas Bull and it was consecrated on 21 October 1869. The new church was built to the south of the road and the old church stood just north of the road. The old church remained standing for a while (probably a few years) after the new church was completed. The nave is rectangular and the choir is approximately square. There is a sacristy on the north side of the choir and a baptismal waiting room (from 1969) in the extension of the choir.

== Media gallery ==

Drawing of the interior of the old church

== See also ==
- List of churches in Tunsberg
