= Lierskogen Church =

Church in Buskerud, Norway

- Lierskogen kirke
- View of the church
- Lierskogen Church
- 59°49′11″N 10°20′00″E
- Location: Lier Municipality, Buskerud
- Country: Norway
- Denomination: Church of Norway
- Churchmanship: Evangelical Lutheran

History
- Status: Parish church
- Founded: 1936
- Consecrated: 17 Jan 1937

Architecture
- Functional status: Active
- Architect: Nils Nilsen
- Architectural type: Long church
- Completed: 1936 (90 years ago)

Specifications
- Capacity: 150
- Materials: Stone

Administration
- Diocese: Tunsberg
- Deanery: Drammen og Lier
- Parish: Tranby og Lierskogen

Lierskogen Church (Norwegian: Lierskogen kirke) is a parish church of the Church of Norway in Lier Municipality in Buskerud county, Norway. It is located in the village of Lierskogen. It is one of the churches for the Tranby og Lierskogen parish which is part of the Drammen og Lier prosti (deanery) in the Diocese of Tunsberg. The white, stone church was built in a long church design in 1936 using plans drawn up by the architect Nils Nilsen. The church seats about 150 people.

== History ==
The church was originally built as a prayer house which was designed by Nils Nilsen. The stone building was completed in the autumn of 1936 and was consecrated on 17 January 1937. The prayer house had a main hall with 150 seats and a smaller hall, a small kitchen, and a caretaker's apartment on the 2nd floor. In 1960, the prayer house had a bell tower with a spire added, with a dedication on November 26. Gradually, the building was titled as Lierskogen Chapel, although some used the term "prayer house" out of old habit. The 25th anniversary was celebrated in 1962.

In the 1980s, the effects of a lack of maintenance became noticeable, and around the middle of the decade the chapel was restored in a collaboration between the prayer house association and the municipality, and it received a new organ and piano. It reopened on 4 May 1986. The Tranby parish council took over ownership in the 1990s, and after the introduction of the Church Act of 1997, the building was re-titled as Lierskogen Church.

== Media gallery ==

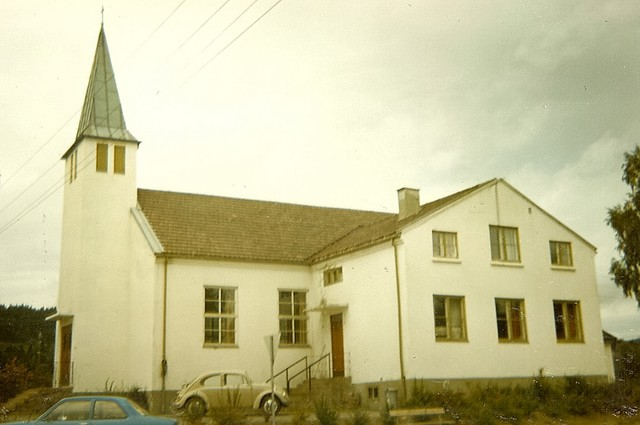

== See also ==
- List of churches in Tunsberg
