= Ask Chapel =

Church in Buskerud, Norway

- Ask kapell
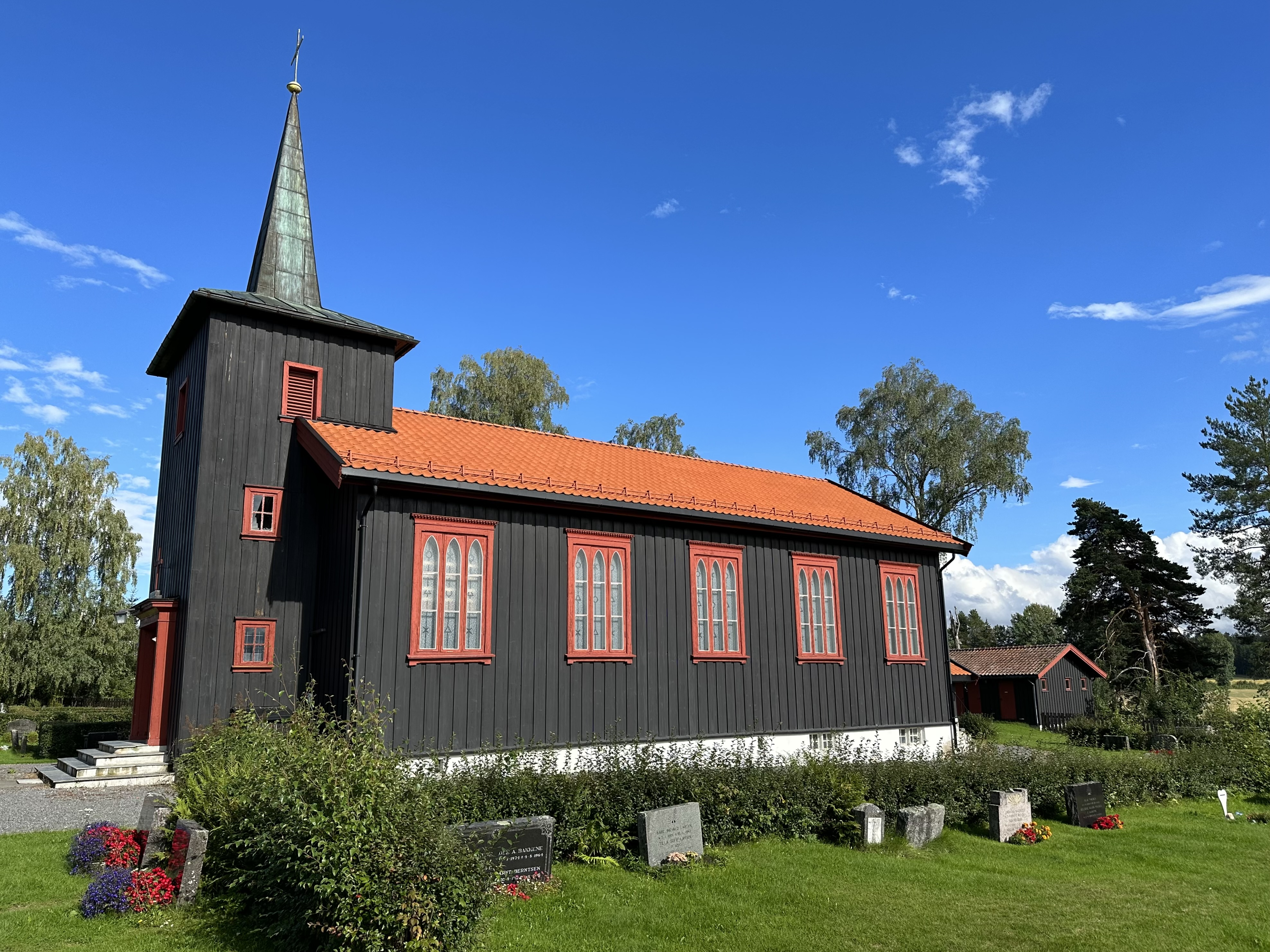
- View of the church
- Ask Chapel
- 60°08′16″N 10°10′51″E
- Location: Ringerike, Buskerud
- Country: Norway
- Denomination: Church of Norway
- Churchmanship: Evangelical Lutheran

History
- Status: Parish church
- Founded: 1936
- Consecrated: 26 Feb 1937

Architecture
- Functional status: Active
- Architect: L.W. Wilhelmsen
- Architectural type: Long church
- Completed: 1936 (90 years ago)

Specifications
- Capacity: 150
- Materials: Wood

Administration
- Diocese: Tunsberg
- Deanery: Ringerike prosti
- Parish: Norderhov og Ask

Ask Chapel (Norwegian: Ask kapell) is a parish church of the Church of Norway in Ringerike Municipality in Buskerud county, Norway. It is located in the village of Ask. It is one of the churches for the Norderhov og Ask parish which is part of the Ringerike prosti (deanery) in the Diocese of Tunsberg. The brown, wooden church was built in a long church design in 1936 using plans drawn up by the architect L.W. Wilhelmsen. The church seats about 150 people.

== History ==
The building was designed by L.W. Wilhelmsen. The construction work was led by Hans E. Sætrang with builder Christian Pettersen. The chapel was built partly from materials from an old gymnasium at Stranden School, and construction took place in 1936. The chapel was consecrated on 26 February 1937. The new chapel was built as a wooden long church.

== Media gallery ==

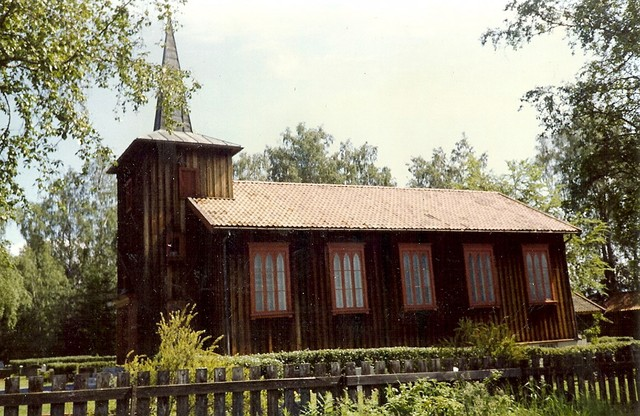

== See also ==
- List of churches in Tunsberg
