= Åmot Church (Buskerud) =

Church in Buskerud, Norway

- Åmot kirke
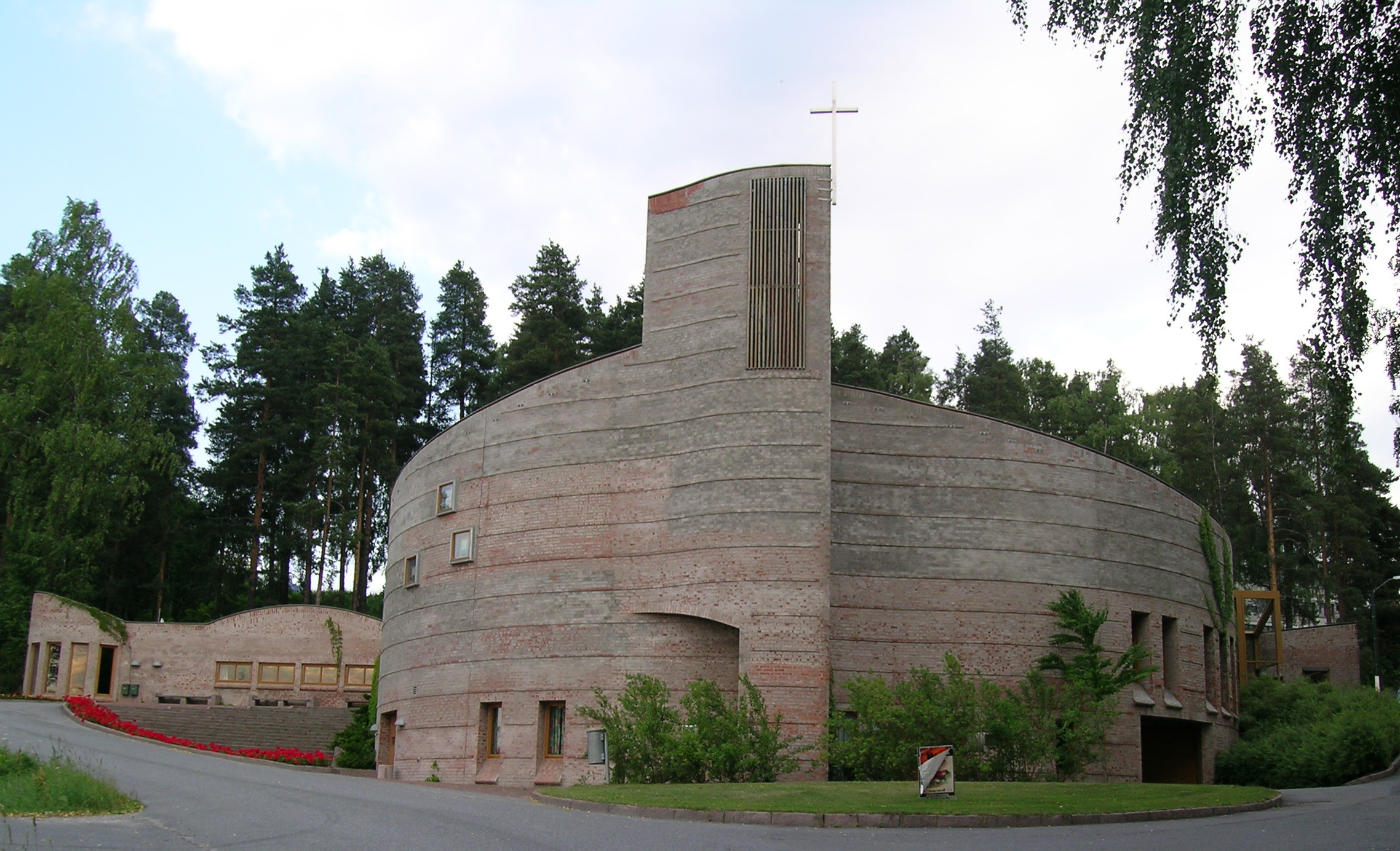
- View of the church
- Åmot Church
- 59°53′43″N 9°55′45″E
- Location: Modum, Buskerud
- Country: Norway
- Denomination: Church of Norway
- Churchmanship: Evangelical Lutheran

History
- Status: Parish church
- Founded: 1892
- Consecrated: 16 May 1996

Architecture
- Functional status: Active
- Architect(s): Arne Åmland and Terje Høgenhaug
- Style: Modern
- Completed: 1996 (30 years ago)

Specifications
- Capacity: 220
- Materials: Brick

Administration
- Diocese: Tunsberg
- Deanery: Eiker prosti
- Parish: Modum
- Norwegian Cultural Heritage Site
- Type: Church
- Status: Not protected
- ID: 85967

Åmot Church (Norwegian: Åmot kirke) is a parish church of the Church of Norway in Modum Municipality in Buskerud county, Norway. It is located in the village of Åmot. It is one of the churches for the Modum parish which is part of the Eiker prosti (deanery) in the Diocese of Tunsberg. The red brick church was built in a modern design in 1996 using plans drawn up by the architects Arne Åmland and Terje Høgenhaug. The church seats about 220 people.

== History ==
Åmot Chapel in Modum was built as a prayer house in 1892. In 1906, the building was remodeled into a chapel using designs by the architect H. Horn. It was a wooden long church with 100 seats. This chapel was set on fire on the night of 17 May 1994. The chapel did not burn down completely, but the damage was so extensive that it was decided to demolish the building and then construct a new building on the same site. The new building was designed by Arne Åmland and Terje Høgenhaug. The foundation stone was laid on the anniversary of the fire in 1995. The new church was consecrated on 16 May 1996. The new church is much larger than the old chapel and the new building houses the parish administration for the churches in Modum Municipality. The church design is modern, with part of the building being almost semicircular, but behind it there are a number of other components, and the complex also contains a number of different rooms.

== See also ==
- List of churches in Tunsberg
