= Strømsoddbygda Chapel =

Church in Buskerud, Norway

- Strømsoddbygda kapell
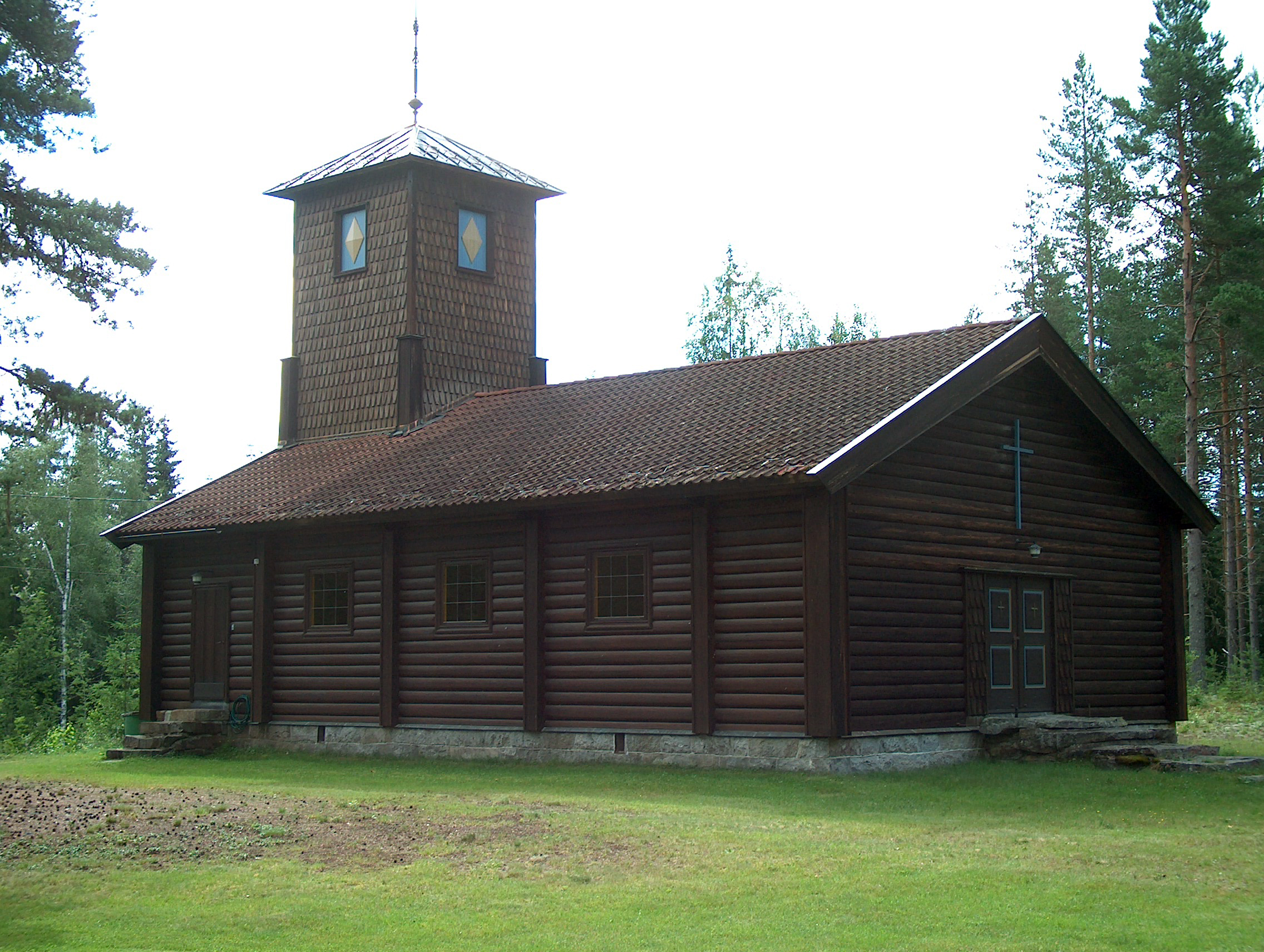
- View of the church
- Strømsoddbygda Chapel
- 60°20′23″N 9°50′38″E
- Location: Ringerike, Buskerud
- Country: Norway
- Denomination: Church of Norway
- Churchmanship: Evangelical Lutheran

History
- Status: Parish church
- Founded: 1953
- Consecrated: 6 Oct 1957

Architecture
- Functional status: Active
- Architect: O.E. Slaatto
- Architectural type: Long church
- Completed: 1953 (73 years ago)

Specifications
- Capacity: 100
- Materials: Wood

Administration
- Diocese: Tunsberg
- Deanery: Ringerike prosti
- Parish: Lunder
- Norwegian Cultural Heritage Site
- Type: Church
- Status: Not protected
- ID: 84988

Strømsoddbygda Chapel (Norwegian: Strømsoddbygda kapell) is a parish church of the Church of Norway in Ringerike Municipality in Buskerud county, Norway. It is located in the village of Strømsoddbygda. It is one of the churches for the Lunder parish which is part of the Ringerike prosti (deanery) in the Diocese of Tunsberg. The brown, wooden church was built in a long church design in 1953 using plans drawn up by the architect O.E. Slaatto. The church seats about 100 people.

== History ==
There were plans (or at least wishes) for a chapel in the village of Strømsoddbygda as early as 1903, but a building committee was not appointed until 1942. Land was donated from the Aure farm, and timber was provided by the people of the congregation. The chapel was designed by O.E. Slaatto and it was built during 1953 by the builder Anders Aure and assistants. It was not consecrated until 6 October 1957. It is a log construction long church. The body of the building is rectangular with a choir and tower on the east end with sacristies on each side. The main entrance is on the west end.

== Media gallery ==
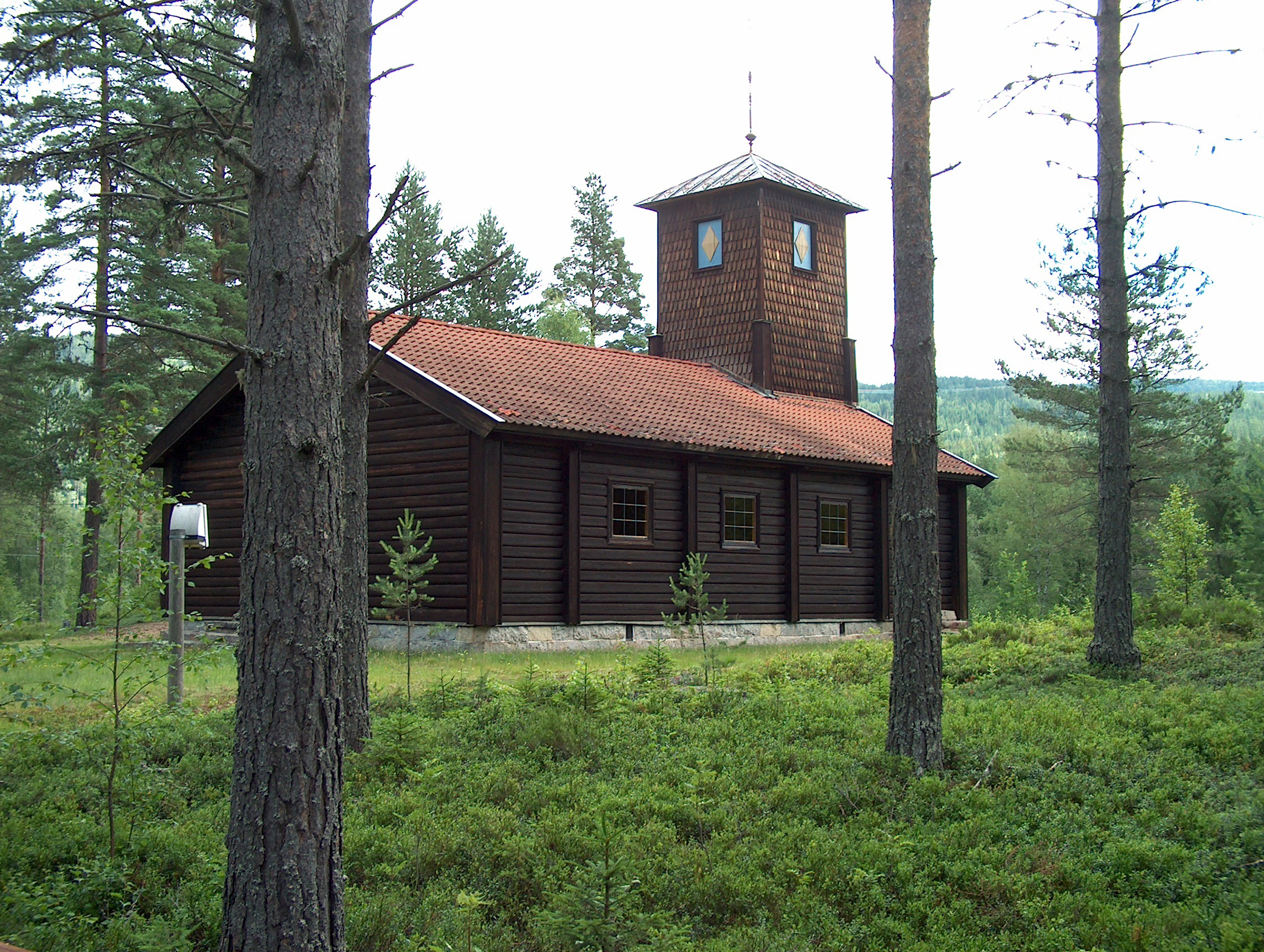

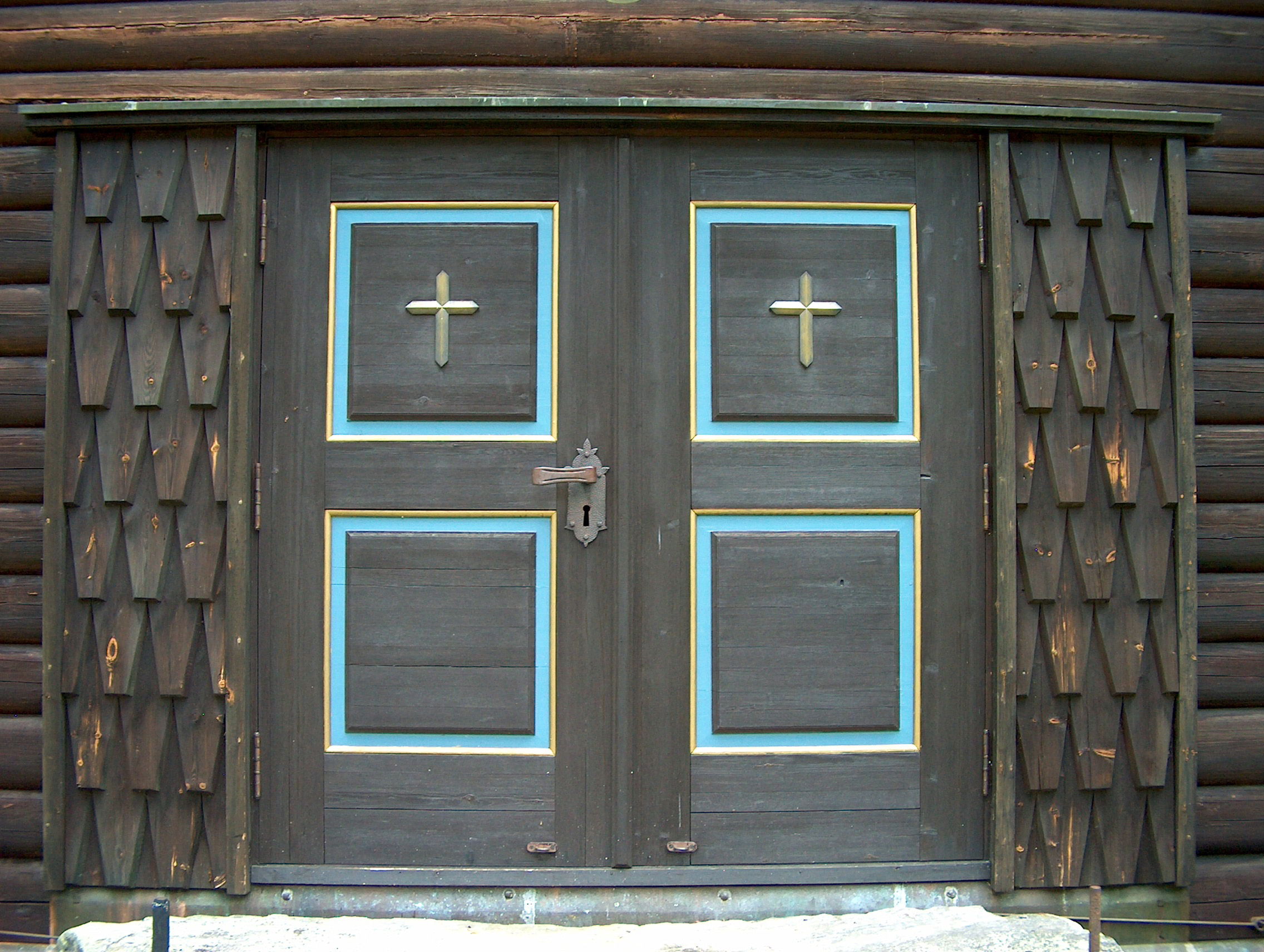

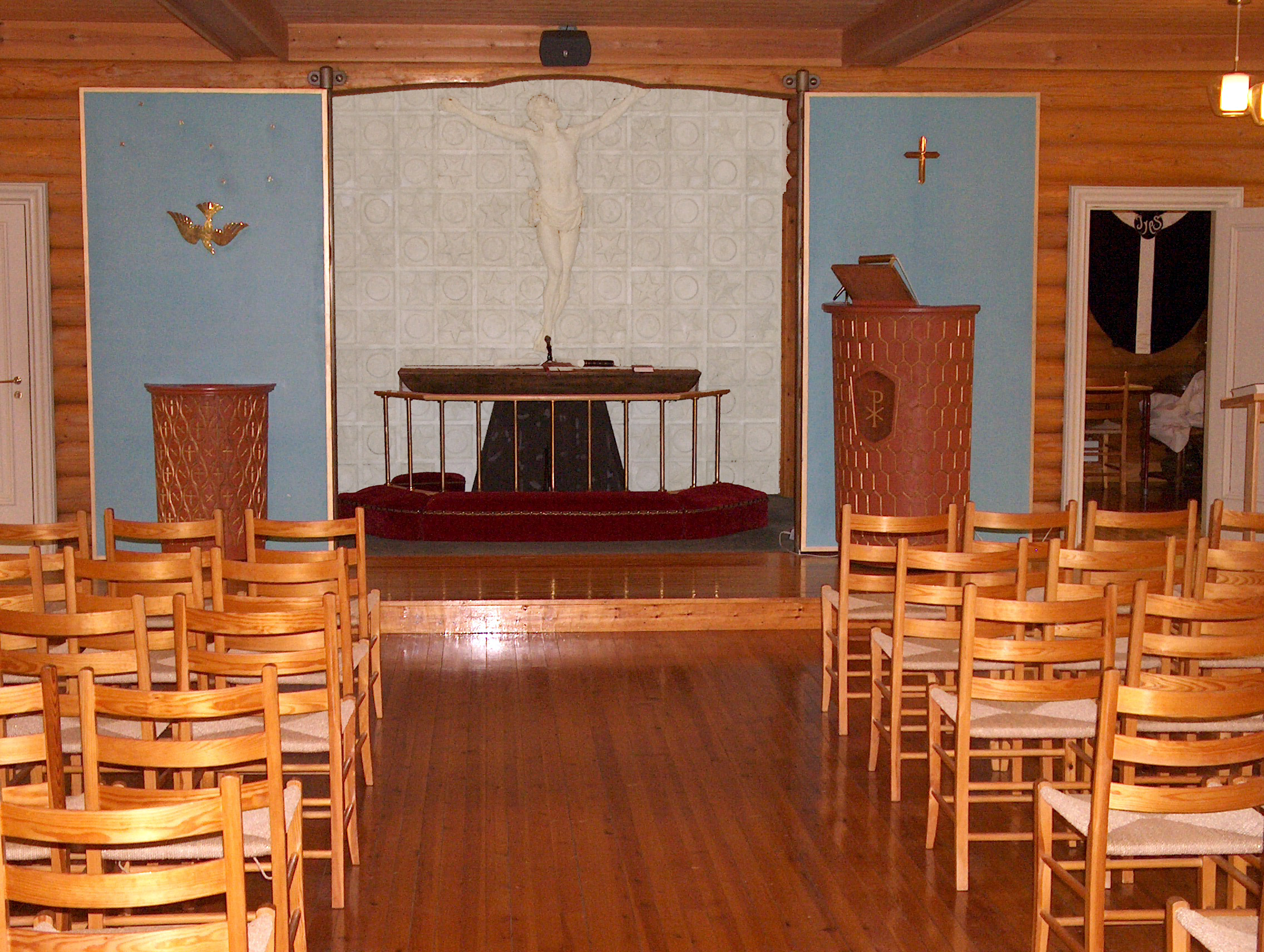

== See also ==
- List of churches in Tunsberg
