= Bugården Church =

Church in Vestfold, Norway

- Bugården kirke
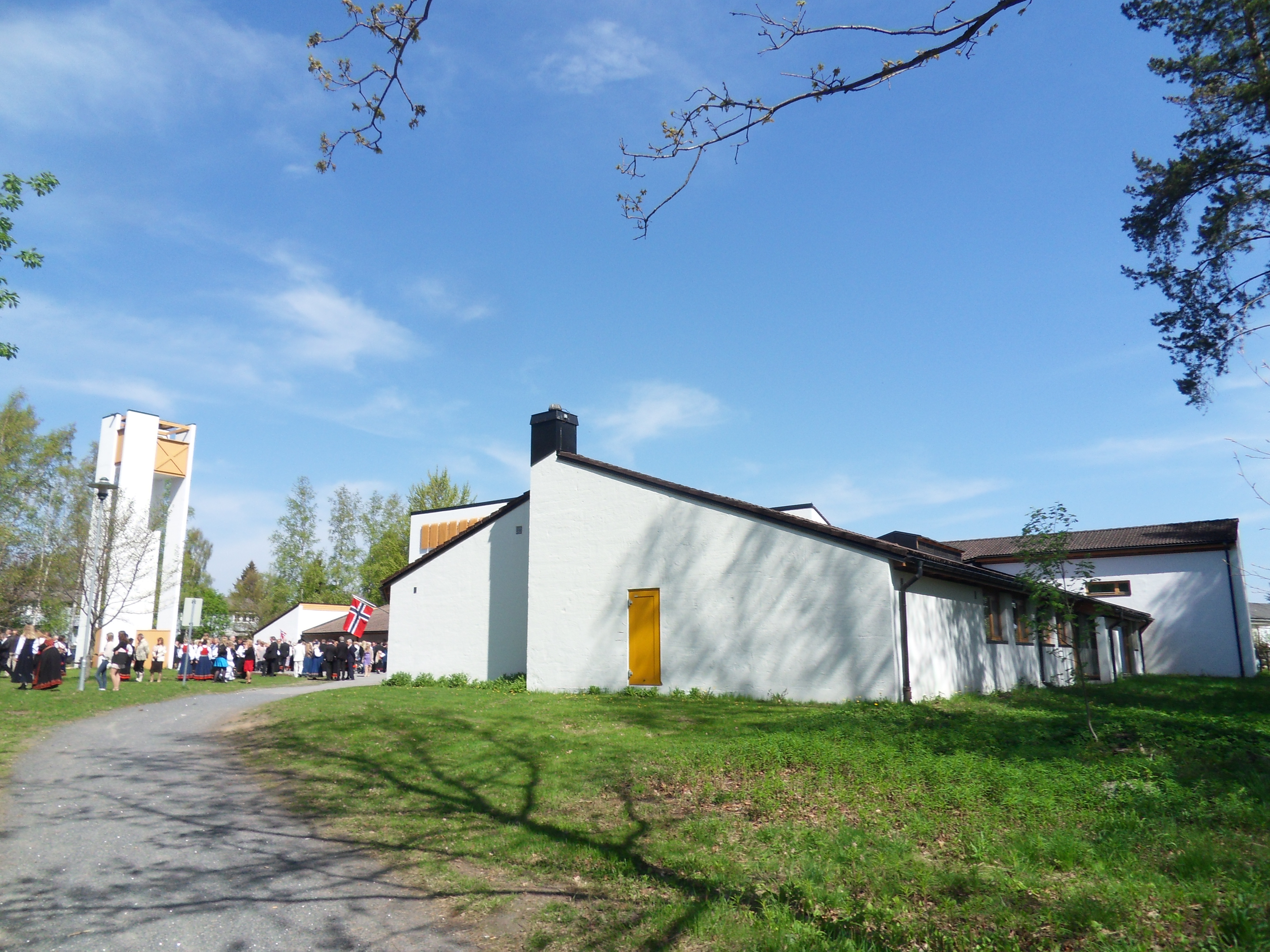
- View of the church
- Bugården Church
- 59°08′12″N 10°11′05″E
- Location: Sandefjord Municipality, Vestfold
- Country: Norway
- Denomination: Church of Norway
- Churchmanship: Evangelical Lutheran

History
- Status: Parish church
- Founded: 1980
- Consecrated: 14 Dec 1980

Architecture
- Functional status: Active
- Architect: Harald Hille
- Architectural type: Long church
- Completed: 1980 (46 years ago)

Specifications
- Capacity: 350
- Materials: Brick

Administration
- Diocese: Tunsberg
- Deanery: Sandefjord prosti
- Parish: Bugården
- Norwegian Cultural Heritage Site
- Type: Church
- Status: Not protected

Bugården Church (Norwegian: Bugården kirke) is a parish church of the Church of Norway in Sandefjord Municipality in Vestfold county, Norway. It is located in the city of Sandefjord. It is the church for the Bugården parish which is part of the Sandefjord prosti (deanery) in the Diocese of Tunsberg. The white, brick church was built in a long church design in 1980 using plans drawn up by the architect Harald Hille. The church seats about 350 people.

== History ==
In the 1970s, planning began for a new church in the northwestern part of the city of Sandefjord. In 1975, an architectural competition was announced for designing the new church. Harald Hille won the competition. Bugården church was consecrated by the bishop on 14 December 1980. The new church has seating for about 350 people, but this can be expanded to about 650 with the help of an adjacent parish hall. The brick building has a complex shape and contains space for a wide range of other functions. There is a free-standing bell tower (campanile) next to the church.

== See also ==
- List of churches in Tunsberg
