= Vestfossen Church =

Church in Buskerud, Norway

- Vestfossen kirke
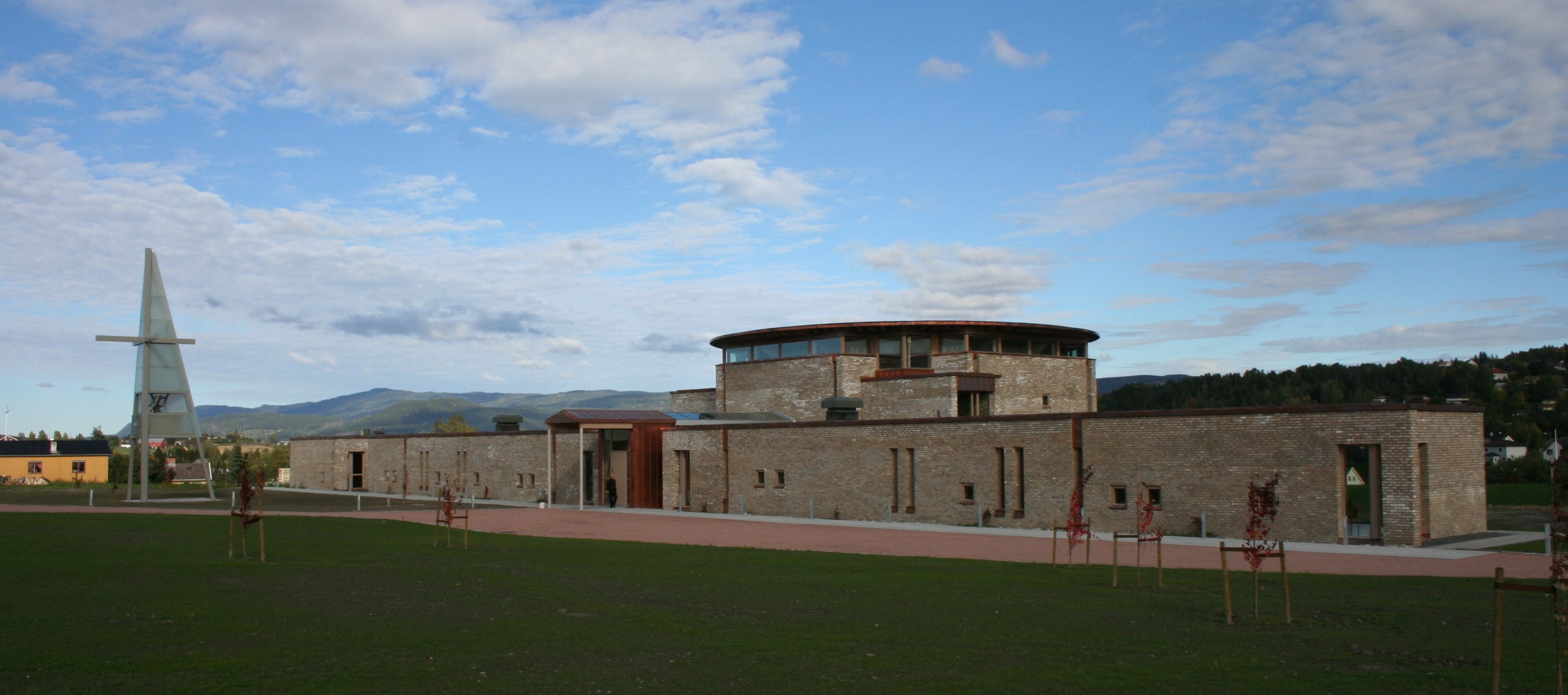
- View of the church
- Vestfossen Church
- 59°43′51″N 9°52′17″E
- Location: Øvre Eiker, Buskerud
- Country: Norway
- Denomination: Church of Norway
- Churchmanship: Evangelical Lutheran

History
- Status: Parish church
- Founded: 1863
- Consecrated: 29 Aug 2010

Architecture
- Functional status: Active
- Architect: Arkitektkompaniet AS
- Architectural type: Rectangular
- Completed: 2010 (16 years ago)

Specifications
- Capacity: 450
- Materials: Brick

Administration
- Diocese: Tunsberg
- Deanery: Eiker prosti
- Parish: Vestfossen
- Norwegian Cultural Heritage Site
- Type: Church
- Status: Not protected
- ID: 85813

Vestfossen Church (Norwegian: Vestfossen kirke) is a parish church of the Church of Norway in Øvre Eiker Municipality in Buskerud county, Norway. It is located in the village of Vestfossen. It is the church for the Vestfossen parish which is part of the Eiker prosti (deanery) in the Diocese of Tunsberg. The tan brick church was built in a rectangular design in 2010 using plans drawn up by the architect Arkitektkompaniet AS. The church seats about 450 people.

== History ==
The first church in Vestfossen was a small prayer house built with private funds in 1862–1863. On 2 May 1902, the building was consecrated as a chapel. In 1920 a tower was added. In 1910, the municipality donated a plot of land to be used as a church, however, it took just over a hundred years before construction of a new church took place. In 1997, Vestfossen was given the status of a parish, and the chapel was used as the parish's interim church until a new Vestfossen Church was completed.

In 2008, money was allocated by Øvre Eiker Municipality and the Øvre Eiker church council. On 1 June 2009 construction began on a new Vestfossen Church on a site about 300 metres (980 ft) east of the old chapel. The new building was designed by Arkitektkompaniet AS. After a service in the chapel on 14 February 2010, the bishop laid the foundation stone for the new church. The church was built during 2010 and it was consecrated on 29 August 2010. Vestfossen Church is a working church with yellow brick in many of the facades. The west part has the form of a long, narrow building, almost like a wall, with an entrance through an opening in the middle that leads into the church square, which is circular and supported by columns (the apostles) and surrounded by large glass surfaces. The sanctuary itself is in a separate part of the building and is almost rectangular with galleries on three sides and a wide, curved back wall, a kind of apse.

== See also ==
- List of churches in Tunsberg
