= Glesne Chapel =

Church in Buskerud, Norway

- Glesne kapell
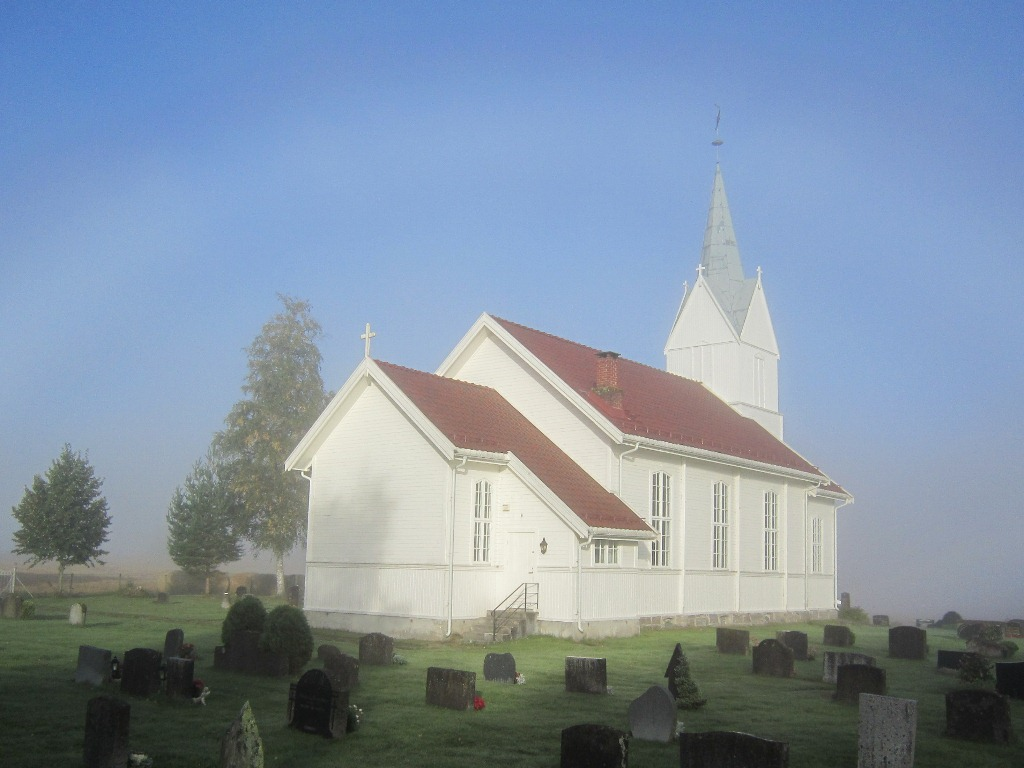
- View of the church
- Glesne Chapel
- 60°07′19″N 9°45′43″E
- Location: Krødsherad, Buskerud
- Country: Norway
- Denomination: Church of Norway
- Churchmanship: Evangelical Lutheran

History
- Status: Parish church
- Founded: 1909
- Consecrated: 24 Feb 1909

Architecture
- Functional status: Active
- Architect: Hans Horn
- Architectural type: Long church
- Completed: 1909 (117 years ago)

Specifications
- Capacity: 200
- Materials: Wood

Administration
- Diocese: Tunsberg
- Deanery: Eiker prosti
- Parish: Krødsherad
- Norwegian Cultural Heritage Site
- Type: Church
- Status: Not protected
- ID: 84268

Glesne Chapel (Norwegian: Glesne kapell) is a parish church of the Church of Norway in Krødsherad Municipality in Buskerud county, Norway. It is located in the village of Krøderen. It is one of the churches for the Krødsherad parish which is part of the Eiker prosti (deanery) in the Diocese of Tunsberg. The white, wooden church was built in a long church design in 1909 using plans drawn up by the architects Hans Horn. The church seats about 200 people.

== History ==
The chapel was built in 1908 along the shore of the lake Krøderen. The builders were Ole and Jakob Rødningen and the designs were made by Hans Horn. The chapel was consecrated on 24 February 1909. It is a wooden long church with a west tower. The nave is rectangular and the choir is almost square. It is surrounded by a priest's sacristy to the south and a baptismal waiting room to the north, both somewhat shorter than the choir.

== See also ==
- List of churches in Tunsberg
