= Elisabet Fidjestøl =

Norwegian politician

Elisabet Oddrun Fidjestøl (25 October 1922 - 28 November 2013) was a Norwegian politician for the Christian Democratic Party.

She served as a deputy representative to the Parliament of Norway from Vestfold during the terms 1969–1973 and 1973–1977. In total she met during 84 days of parliamentary session. She worked as an architect in Tønsberg.
