= Skjønne Church =

Church in Buskerud, Norway

- Skjønne kirke
- View of the church
- Skjønne Church
- 60°15′32″N 8°59′57″E
- Location: Nore og Uvdal, Buskerud
- Country: Norway
- Denomination: Church of Norway
- Churchmanship: Evangelical Lutheran

History
- Status: Parish church
- Founded: 1880
- Consecrated: 5 October 1880

Architecture
- Functional status: Active
- Architect: Henrik Nissen
- Architectural type: Long church
- Completed: 1880 (146 years ago)

Specifications
- Capacity: 230
- Materials: Wood

Administration
- Diocese: Tunsberg
- Deanery: Kongsberg prosti
- Parish: Nore
- Norwegian Cultural Heritage Site
- Type: Church
- Status: Not protected
- ID: 85467

Skjønne Church (Norwegian: Skjønne kirke) is a parish church of the Church of Norway in Nore og Uvdal Municipality in Buskerud county, Norway. It is located just east of the village of Rødberg. It is one of the churches for the Nore parish which is part of the Kongsberg prosti (deanery) in the Diocese of Tunsberg. The white, wooden church was built in a long church design in 1880 using plans drawn up by the architect Henrik Nissen. The church seats about 230 people.

== History ==
In the 1870s, the parish began planning to replace the old Nore Stave Church, but there was a disagreement over where to build the new church. Some wanted to build it on the same site, but others wanted to build it in Skjønne, a bit further north and just southeast of Rødberg. Instead, it was decided to build two churches: one in Nore and one in Skjønne. The new church in Skjønne was designed by Henrik Nissen. The master builder Gulbrand Johnsen built this church and the new Nore Church and both new churches were consecrated on the same day: 5 October 1880. The new Skjønne Church is a long church with rectangular nave and a choir surrounded by a sacristies. The main building is log construction and the tower is timber-framed.

== See also ==
- List of churches in Tunsberg
