= Nore Church =

Church in Buskerud, Norway

- Nore kirke
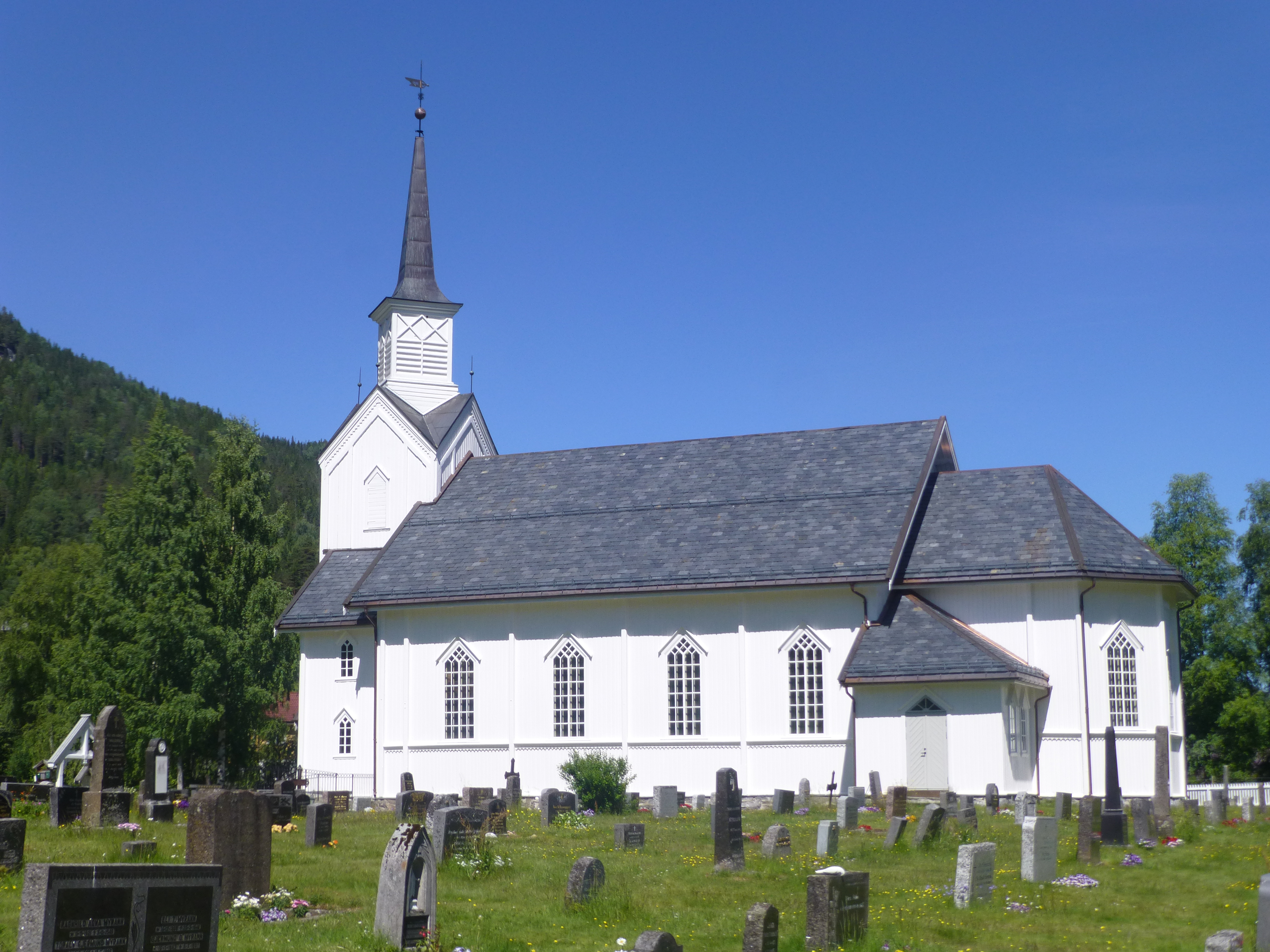
- View of the church
- Nore Church
- 60°10′09″N 9°00′44″E
- Location: Nore og Uvdal, Buskerud
- Country: Norway
- Denomination: Church of Norway
- Churchmanship: Evangelical Lutheran

History
- Status: Parish church
- Founded: 1880
- Consecrated: 5 Oct 1880

Architecture
- Functional status: Active
- Architect: Jacob Wilhelm Nordan
- Architectural type: Long church
- Completed: 1880 (146 years ago)

Specifications
- Capacity: 345
- Materials: Wood

Administration
- Diocese: Tunsberg
- Deanery: Kongsberg prosti
- Parish: Nore
- Norwegian Cultural Heritage Site
- Type: Church
- Status: Automatically protected
- ID: 181202

Nore Church (Norwegian: Nore kirke) is a parish church of the Church of Norway in Nore og Uvdal Municipality in Buskerud county, Norway. It is located in the village of Nore. It is one of the churches for the Nore parish which is part of the Kongsberg prosti (deanery) in the Diocese of Tunsberg. The white, wooden church was built in a long church design in 1880 using plans drawn up by the architect Jacob Wilhelm Nordan. The church seats about 345 people.

== History ==
The old Nore Stave Church (from the latter half of the 12th century) was located along the Norefjorden for centuries. It had been rebuilt over the years, and by the mid-1800s, it had become too small and dilapidated to meet the needs of the parish. Planning began for a new church, but a dispute over the location of the new church broke out and in the end it was decided to build two churches: one at Skjønne (just east of Rødberg) and one in Nore, about 400 metres (1,300 ft) north of the old church. Once the location was decided, Jacob Wilhelm Nordan submitted the architectural drawings for the new Nore Church on New Year's Day 1871. The new church was built by master builder Gulbrand Johnsen and it was consecrated on 5 October 1880. The new building was a long church built out of log construction.

== Media gallery ==

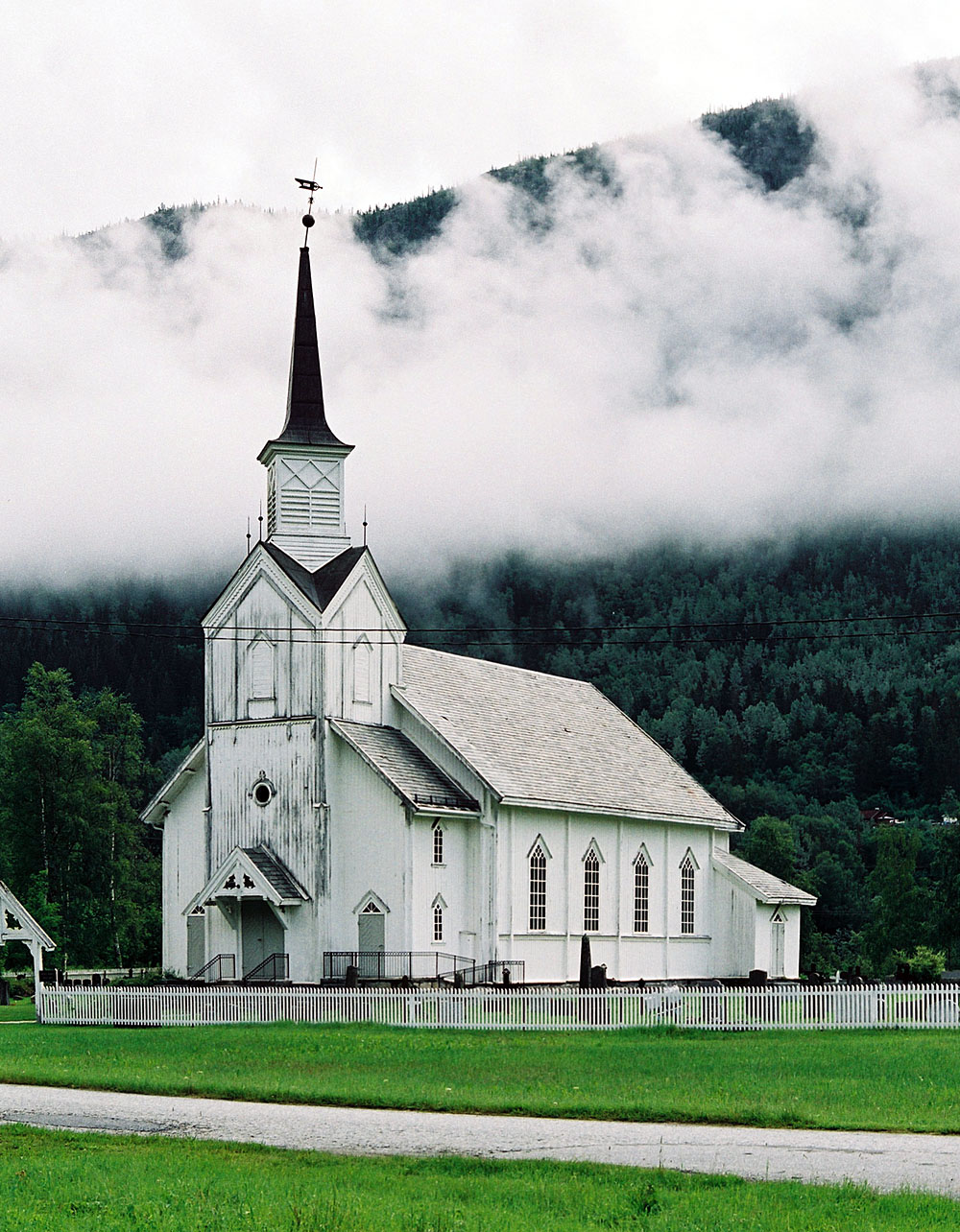

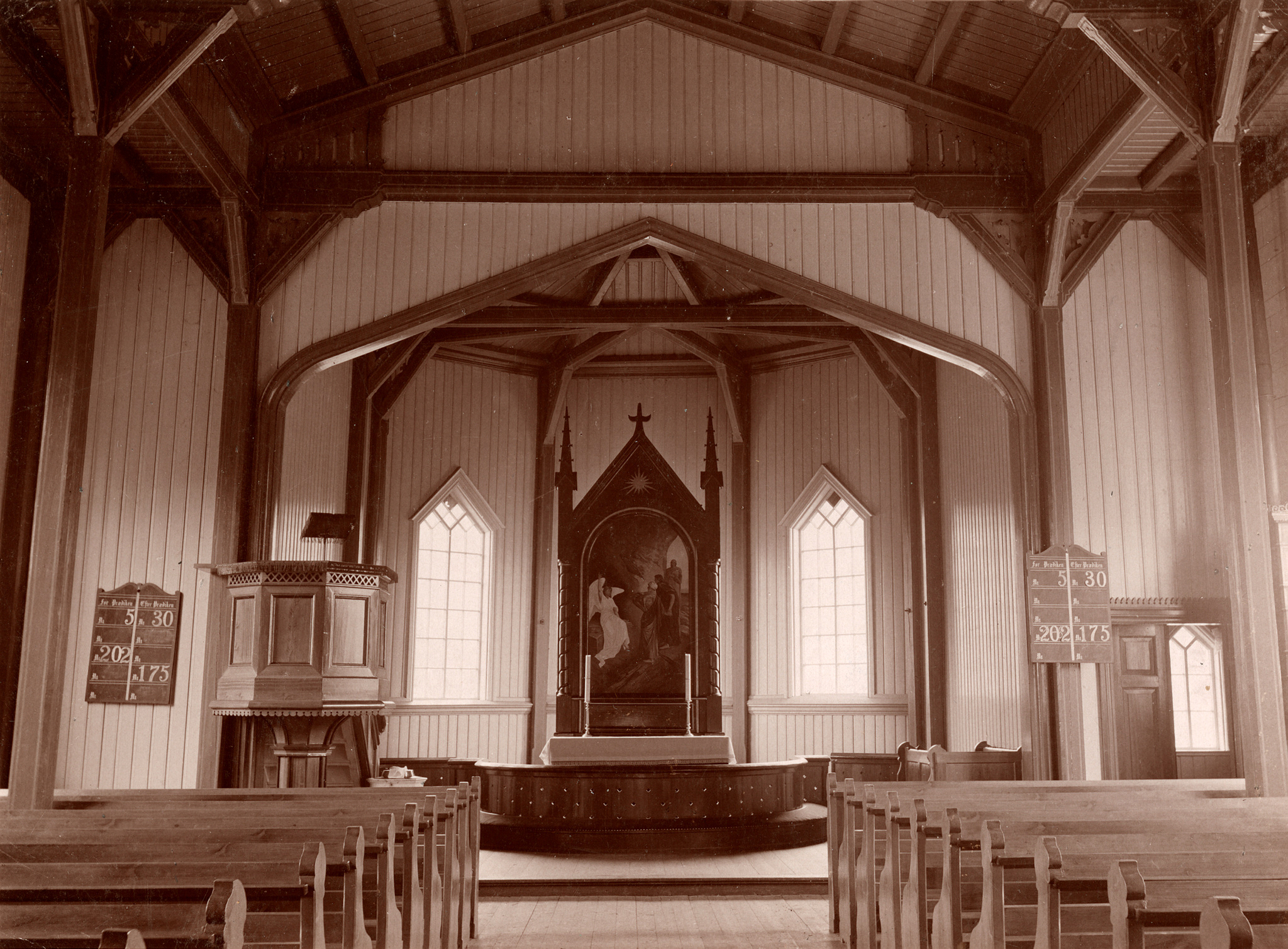

== See also ==
- List of churches in Tunsberg
