= Imingfjellet =

Mountain in Norway

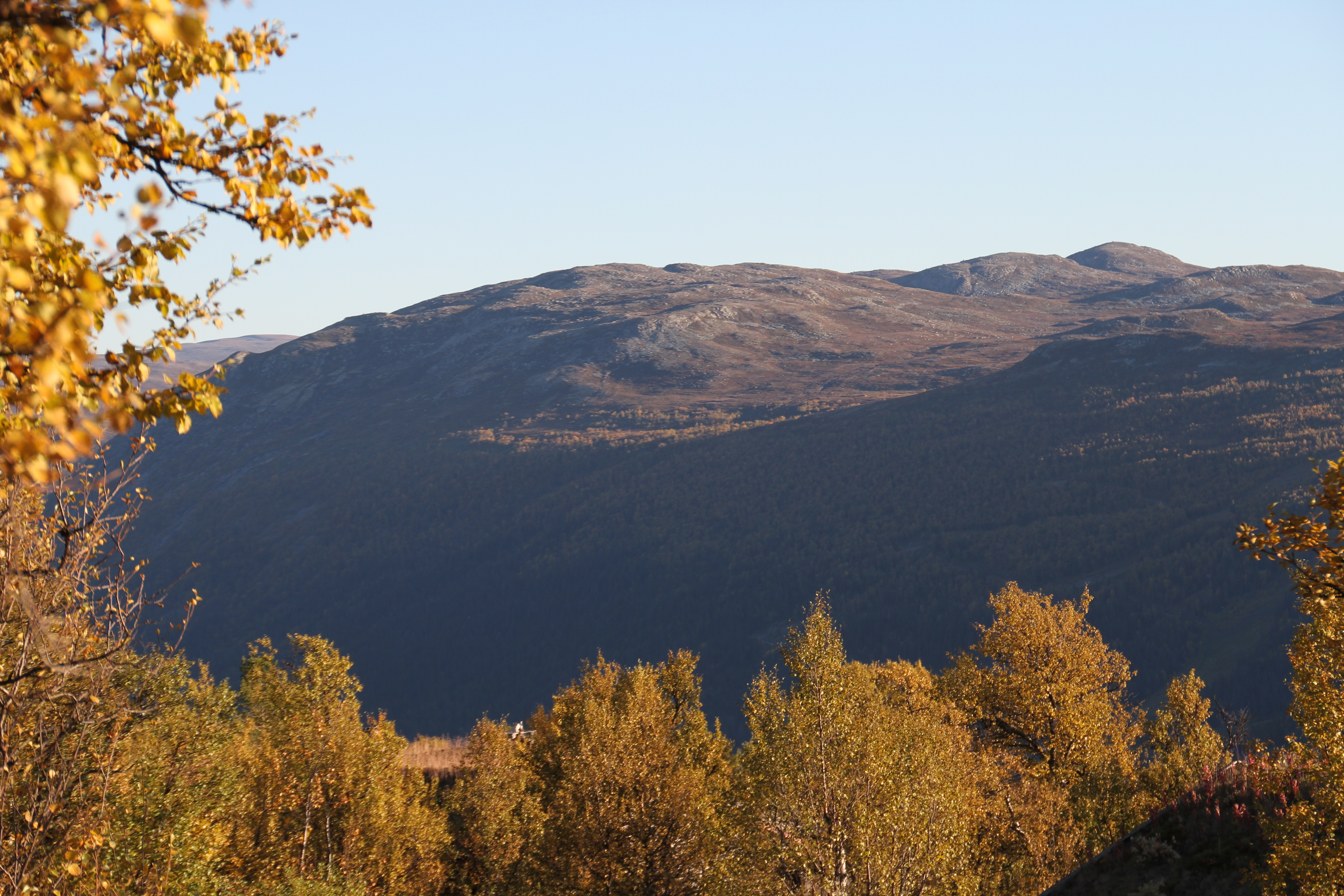
- Imingfjell

Highest point
- Elevation: 1,040 m (3,410 ft)
- Coordinates: 60°15′53.4″N 8°33′38.9″E

Geography
- Location: Buskerud, Norway

Imingfjellet is a mountain in Nore og Uvdal Municipality in Buskerud, Norway.
