= Langedrag Nature Park =

Langedrag Nature Park Langedrag Naturpark
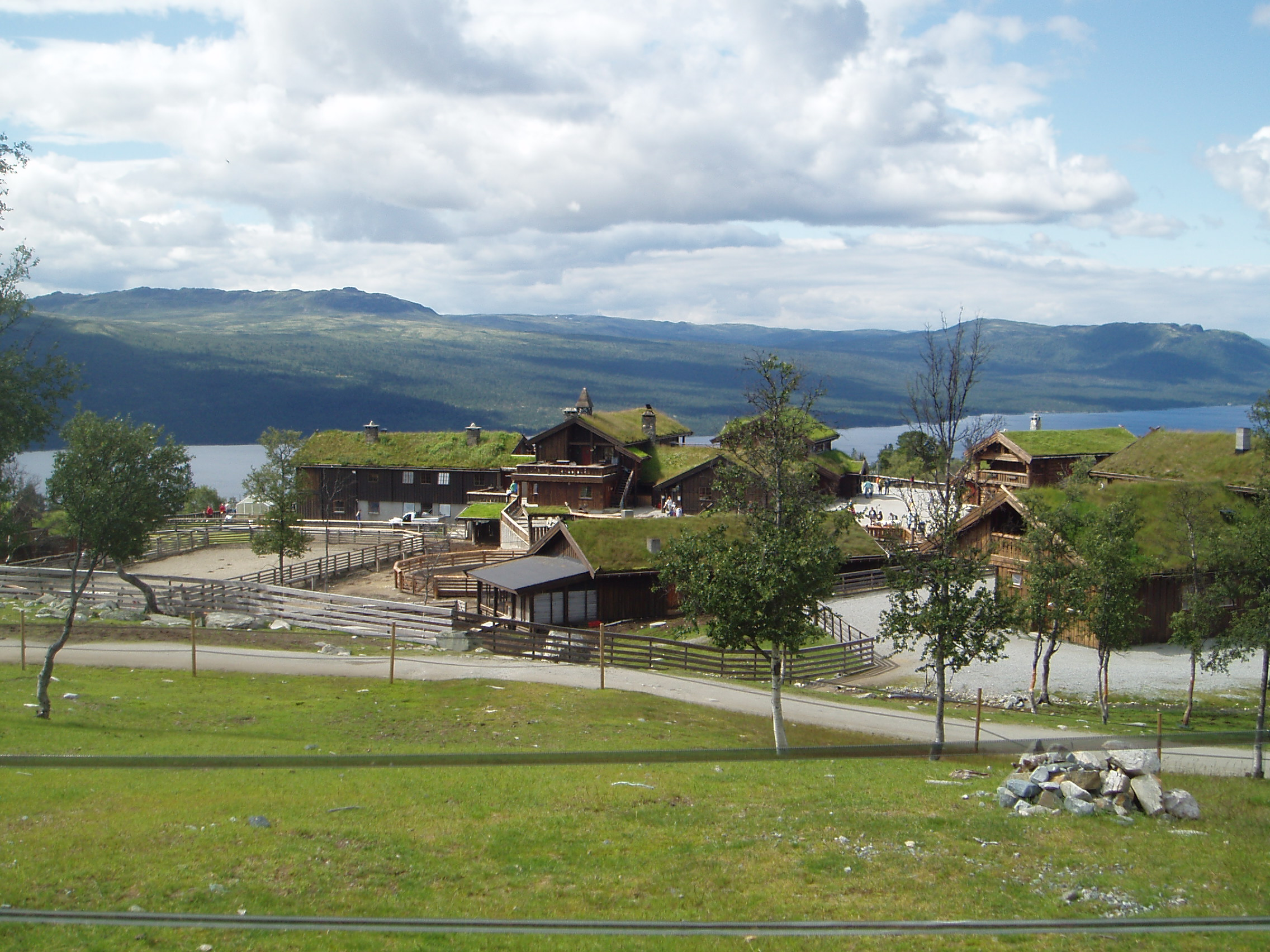
- Interactive map of Langedrag Nature Park; Langedrag Naturpark
- 60°26′51.3″N 8°52′51.8″E
- Date opened: November 1, 1960
- Location: Nore og Uvdal; Norway
- Annual visitors: 60.000 in 2016
- Website: www.langedrag.no

Langedrag Nature Park (full name in Norwegian: E.K.T. AS, Langedrag Naturpark, Fjellgård og Leirskole) is a farm, located 1.000 MAMSL, just south of Tunhovd in Nore og Uvdal municipality in Buskerud county, Norway.

The nature park is known for its collection of various old livestock breeds and wild animals from the Norwegian fauna. Visitors experience exciting predator mammals like wolves and European lynxes, in addition to reindeer, moose, muskox, wild boars, arctic foxes, horses, goats, chickens, ducks, geese and rabbits. Of more exotic animals, there are also wild yaks and European mouflons.

The Langedrag Nature Park is open all year and offers day visits, accommodation and short-term teaching plans that place special emphasis on outdoor activities. There is also horse riding and horse-drawn carriage driving or sledding (horse or dog). The farm at Langedrag Nature Park has been made well known in Norway through the TV series "Vi på Langedrag" ("We at Langedrag"), which NRK sent for the first time in 2001.

== Gallery ==
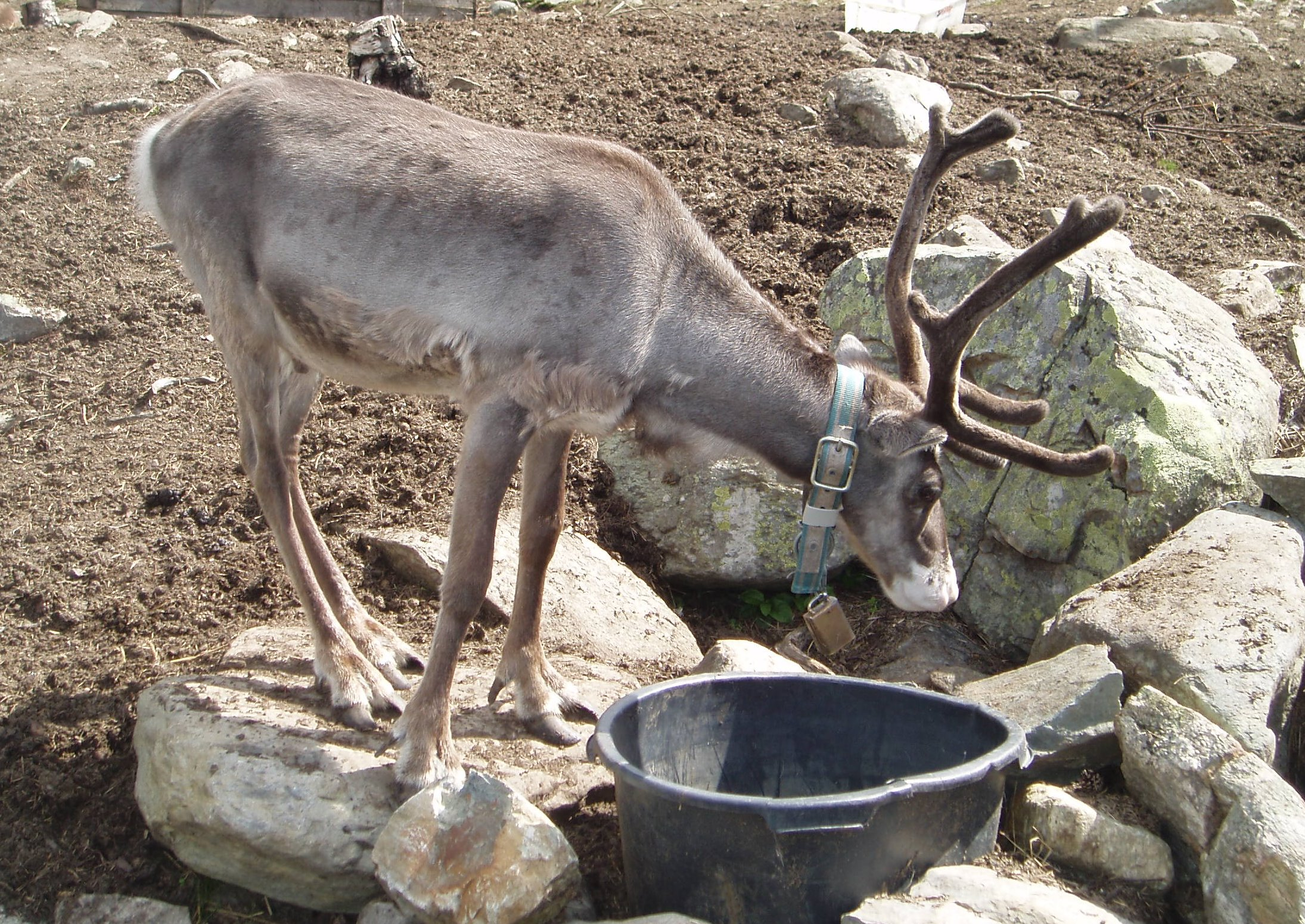
Reindeer

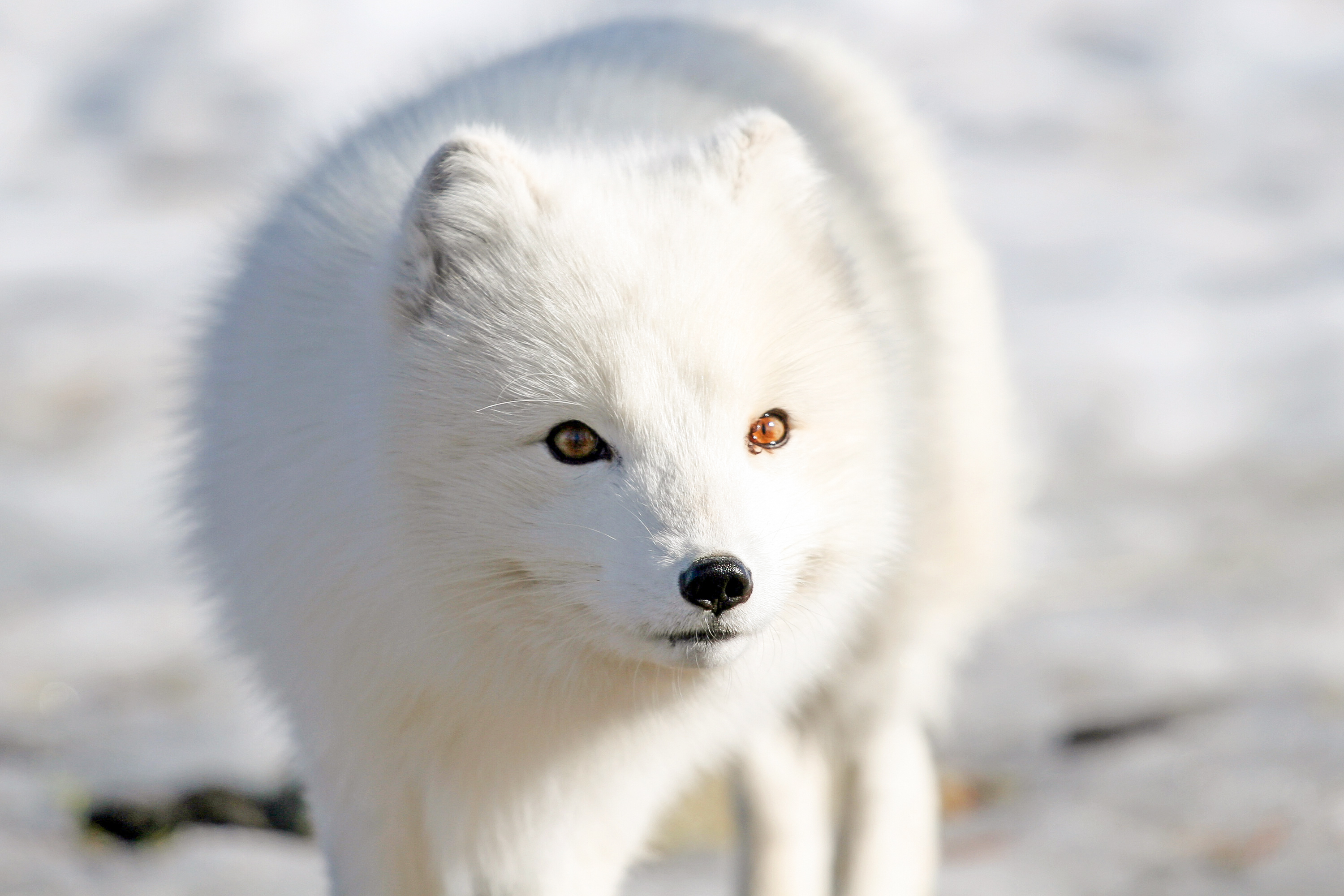
Arctic fox

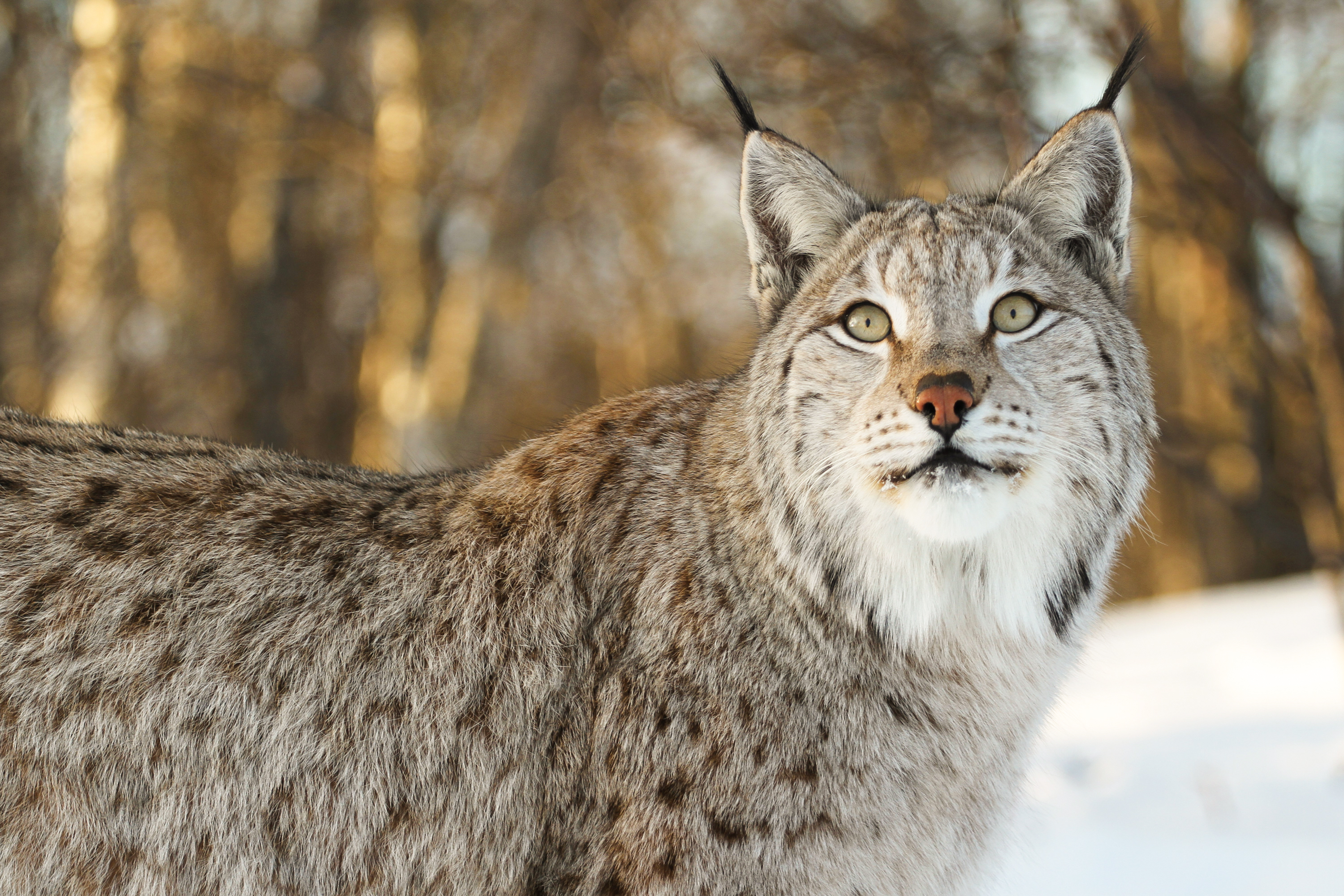
European lynx

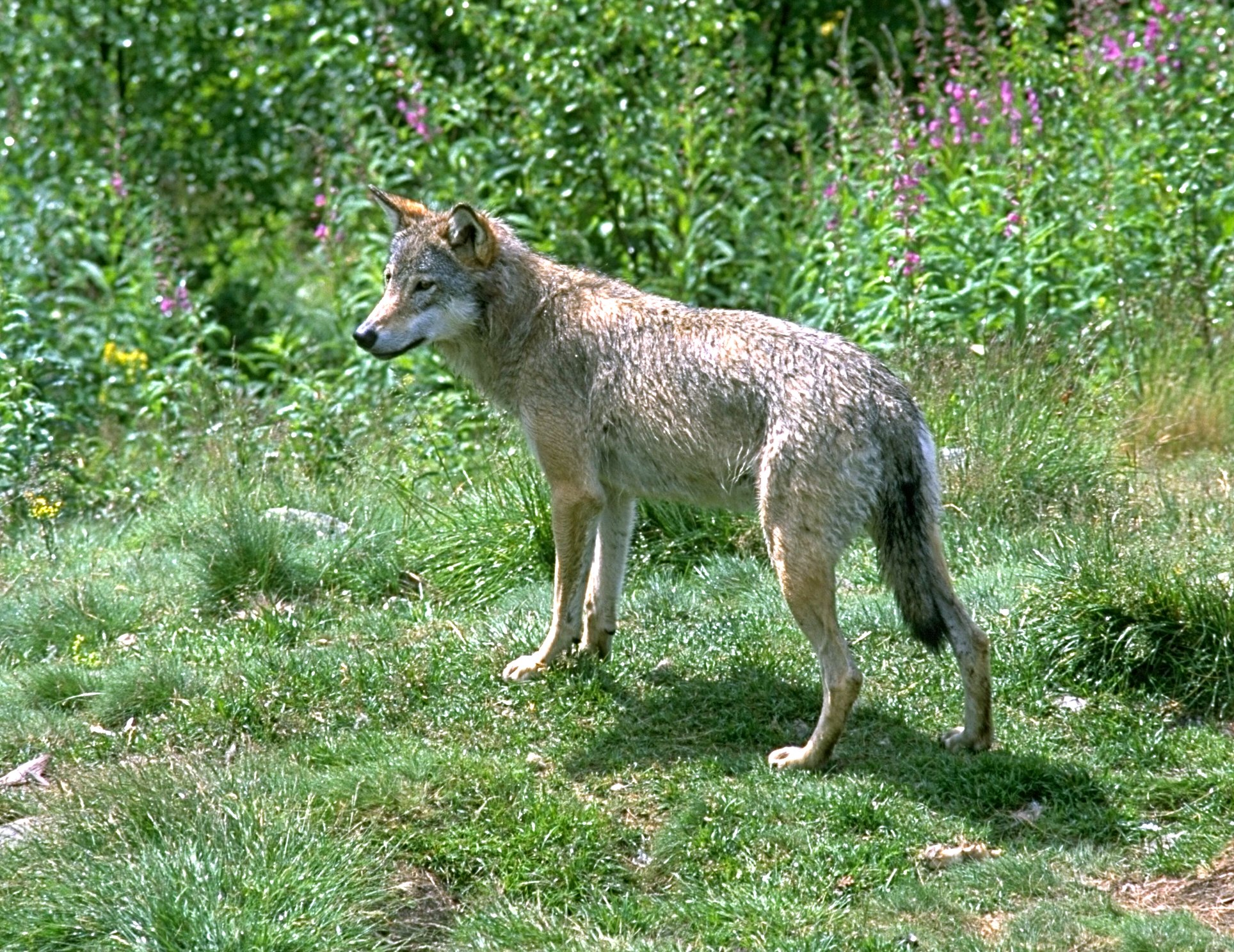
Wolf

(All images from Langedrag Nature Park)
