= Geitsjøen =

Lake in Norway

- Location within Norway
- Location: Nore og Uvdal (Buskerud)
- Coordinates: 60°18′29″N 7°59′32″E
- Basin countries: Norway
- Surface area: 3.15 km^{2} (1.22 sq mi)
- Shore length^{1}: 10.35 km (6.43 mi)
- Surface elevation: 1,111 m (3,645 ft)
- References: NVE
- ^{1} Shore length is not a well-defined measure.

Geitsjøen is a lake in the municipality of Nore og Uvdal in Buskerud, Norway. It lies east of the Hardangervidda mountain plateau, at the lower end of the catchment area of the river Djupa in the Numedalslågen watershed.

== See also ==
- List of lakes in Norway
