= Uvdal =

Village and former municipality in Buskerud county, Norway

Coordinates: 60°15′54″N 8°50′05″E

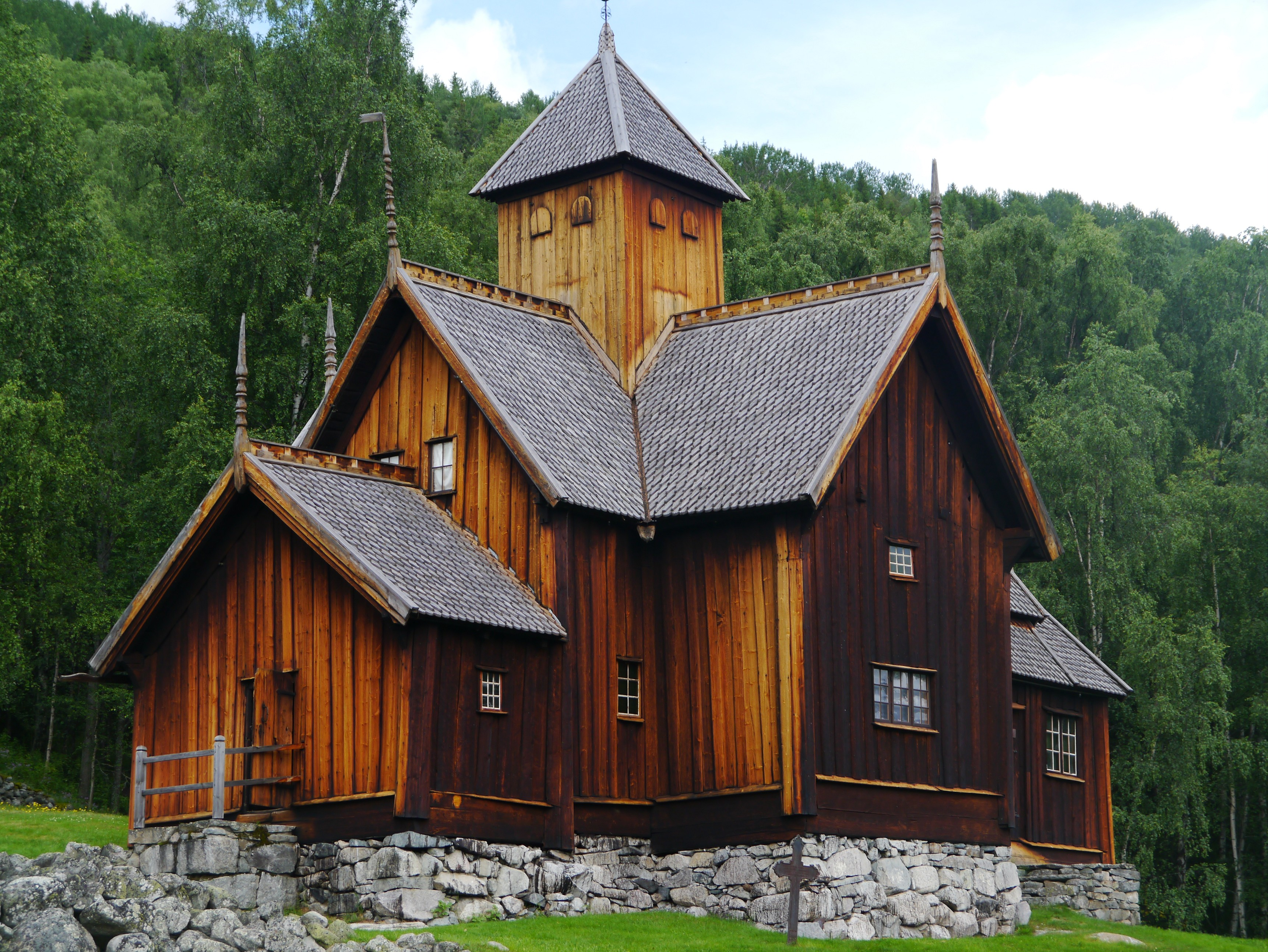
Uvdal Stave Church

Uvdal is a village and former municipality in Buskerud county, Norway. It is situated in the traditional region of Numedal and is the location of the Uvdal Stave Church.

The municipality was created by a split from Nore on 1 January 1901. The new municipality, which was called Opdal at the time, had a population of 1,429. The name was changed to Uvdal on 22 January 1932 by royal resolution. In 1937, a part of Uvdal with 220 inhabitants was moved to Hol municipality. On 1 January 1962, Uvdal was reunited with Nore to form the new municipality Nore og Uvdal. Before the merger, Uvdal had 1,213 inhabitants.

== Other sources ==
- Dag Jukvam / Statistics Norway (1999). "Historisk oversikt over endringer i kommune- og fylkesinndelingen".
