= Line Østvold =

Norwegian snowboarder

Line Lunde Østvold (7 November 1978 – 19 September 2004) was a Norwegian professional snowboarder who specialized in snowboard cross (downhill obstacle) events.

In 2001, she was ranked the number one World Female Boardercross Athlete as well as ESPN Winter X Games Boardercross Champion. After a bruised collarbone injury in 2002, she decided to retire, but when it was announced that her event would be included in the 2006 Winter Olympics, she re-entered the sport.

On 14 September 2004, Østvold was practicing with the Norwegian national snowboard team in Valle Nevado in Chile, in preparation for an FIS World Cup race. She fell on a technical section of the course called the double rollers, suffering head and neck injuries which proved to be fatal. She was flown to a specialty clinic in Santiago de Chile, but never regained consciousness and died five days later, at the age of 25.

Her father Dag Bjørn Østvold and her maternal grandfather Johnny Lunde were alpine skiers on a national level. She hailed from Haugsbygda near Hønefoss.
