= Johnny Lunde =

Norwegian alpine skier and engineer (1923–2013)

Personal information
- Born: 26 October 1923 Nore, Norway
- Died: 2 April 2013 (aged 89)
- Education: ETH Zurich
- Relatives: Line Østvold (granddaughter)

Sport
- Country: Norway
- Sport: Alpine skiing
- Club: Konnerud IL

Johnny Anker Lunde (26 October 1923 – 2 April 2013) was a Norwegian alpine skier and engineer.

== Biography ==
Lunde was born in Nore, and represented the club Konnerud IL. He participated at the 1948 Winter Olympics in Saint Moritz, and at the 1952 Winter Olympics in Oslo. He did not finish the downhill race in 1948, but finished a tied 20th in downhill in 1952. In 1949 he won the downhill competition which was part of the alpine combined in the Norwegian championship.

He graduated as a construction engineer from ETH Zurich in 1949. After working in construction from 1950 to 1958 he spent his career at the Norwegian Geotechnical Institute until 1990, working with geomechanics.

He resided in Sandvika. He was a grandfather of snowboarder Line Østvold. He died in April 2013.
