= Nore Stave Church =

Church in Buskerud, Norway

- Nore stavkirke
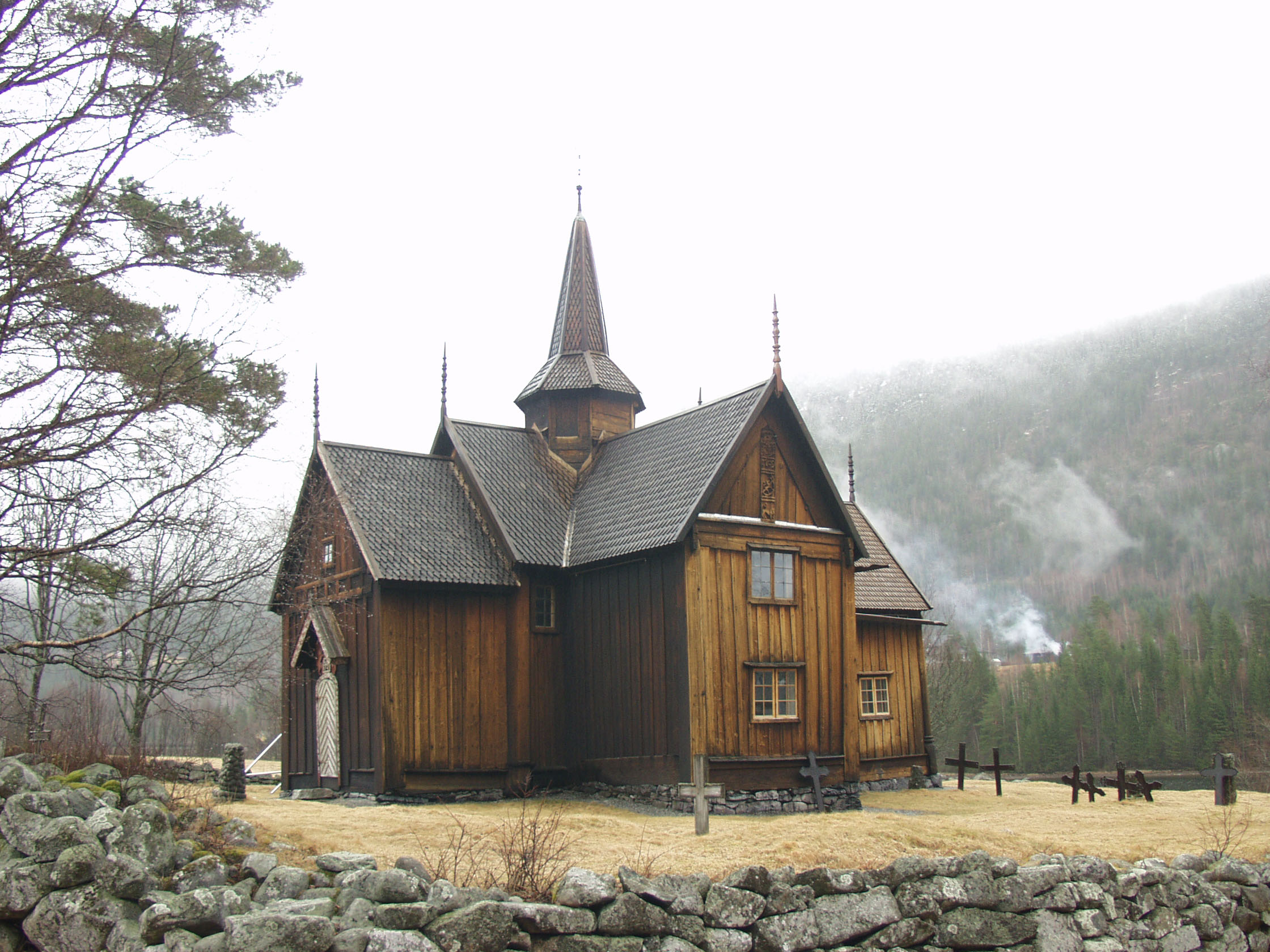
- View of the church
- Nore Stave Church
- 60°09′52″N 9°00′37″E
- Location: Nore og Uvdal, Buskerud
- Country: Norway
- Denomination: Church of Norway
- Previous denomination: Catholic Church
- Churchmanship: Evangelical Lutheran

History
- Status: Parish church
- Founded: c. 1167
- Consecrated: c. 1167

Architecture
- Functional status: Active
- Architectural type: Cruciform
- Completed: c. 1167 (859 years ago)

Specifications
- Capacity: 110
- Materials: Wood

Administration
- Diocese: Tunsberg
- Deanery: Kongsberg prosti
- Parish: Nore
- Norwegian Cultural Heritage Site
- Type: Church
- Status: Automatically protected
- ID: 85174

Nore Stave Church (Norwegian: Nore stavkirke) is a historic parish church of the Church of Norway in Nore og Uvdal Municipality in Buskerud county, Norway. It is located in the village of Nore. It is one of the churches for the Nore parish which is part of the Kongsberg prosti (deanery) in the Diocese of Tunsberg. The brown, wooden church was built in a cruciform design around the year 1167. The church seats about 110 people.

== History ==
The earliest existing historical records of the church date back to the year 1404, but the church was not built that year. Dendrochronological dating of wood samples indicate that Nore Stave Church was built after 1167. The church was built with galleries, a chancel and cross naves – an architectural style that was unique in Europe during the Middle Ages. This style has come to be known as Nummedals-type. Decorations are from different periods. Nore is decorated with tendril and animal carvings. Animal characters featured include dragons and lions.

The church has a central mast that was originally the support for a tower, mostly likely containing church bells. The walls and ceiling of the interior are decorated with murals, among them scenes from the Bible presented as riddles. The church has been remodeled several times, with many original parts preserved. The church was partly rebuilt in the 1600s and 1700s. The chancel was replaced in 1683, and the spokes of the nave in the first half of the 18th century. The church received a new roof in 1730. Comprehensive repair was carried out in 1927.

By the mid-1800s, the church had become too small and dilapidated to meet the needs of the parish. Planning began for a new church, but a dispute over the location of the new church broke out and in the end it was decided to build two churches: one at Skjønne (just east of Rødberg) and one in Nore, about 400 metres (1,300 ft) north of the old church. After the new churches were completed in 1880, the old Nore Stave Church was taken out of regular use. It is now only used for special occasions. In 1888, art historian, professor of art history, and author Lorentz Dietrichson (1834–1917) became the owner of the church. Professor Dietrichson, who played a major role in founding the Society for the Preservation of Ancient Norwegian Monuments, donated the property to the society in 1890.

== Media gallery ==
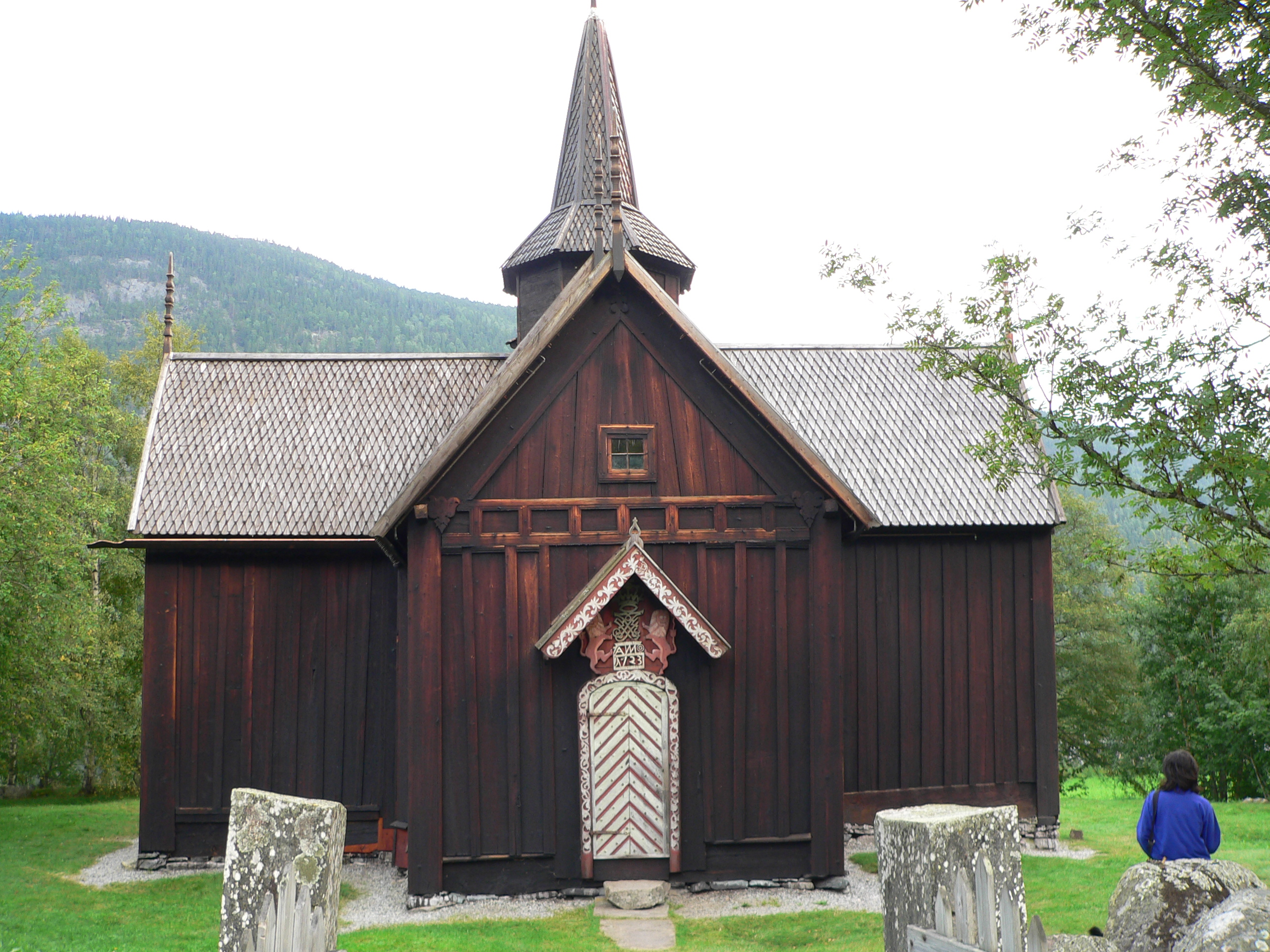
Nore Stave Church

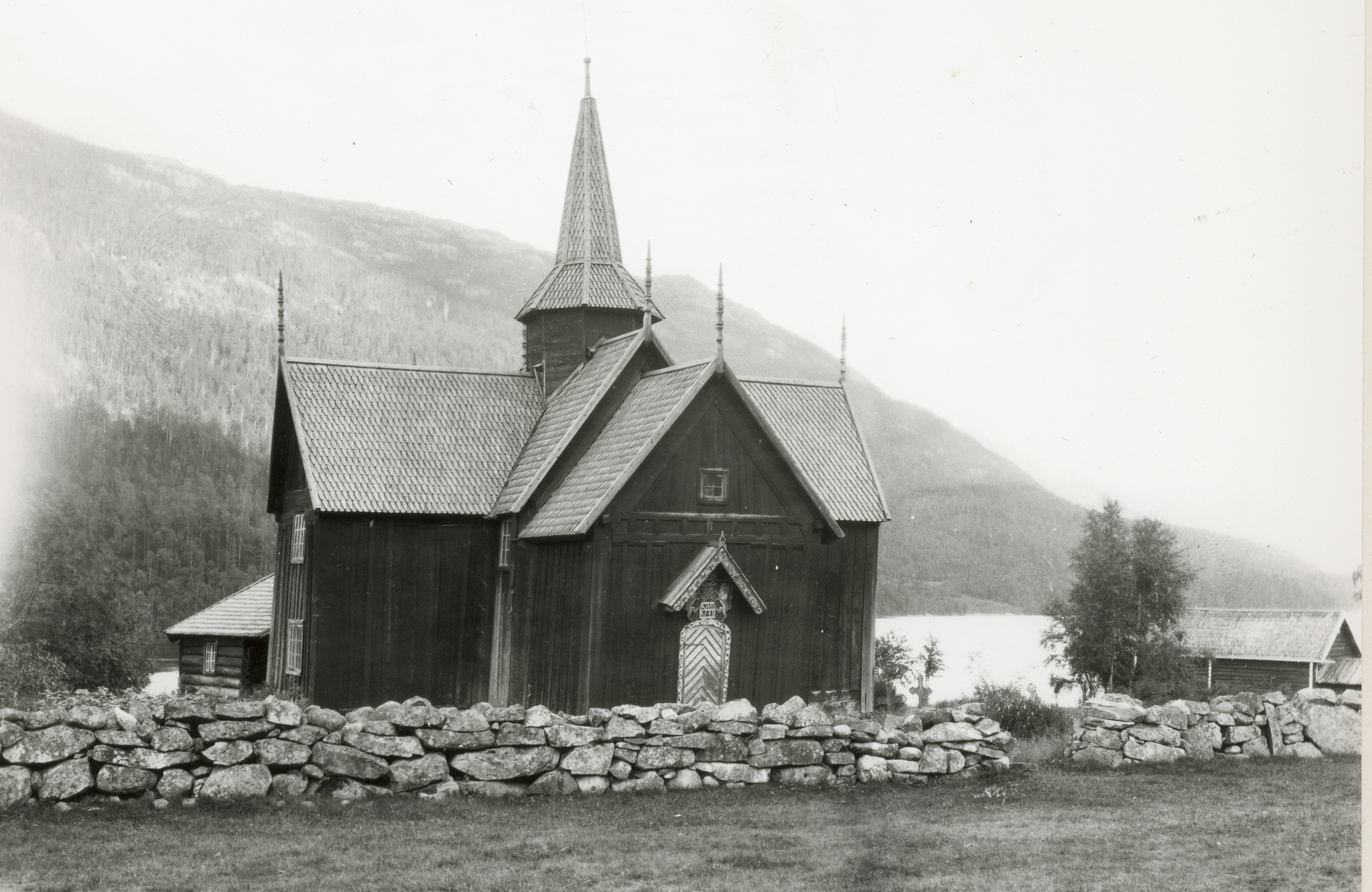
Nore Stave Church in 1931

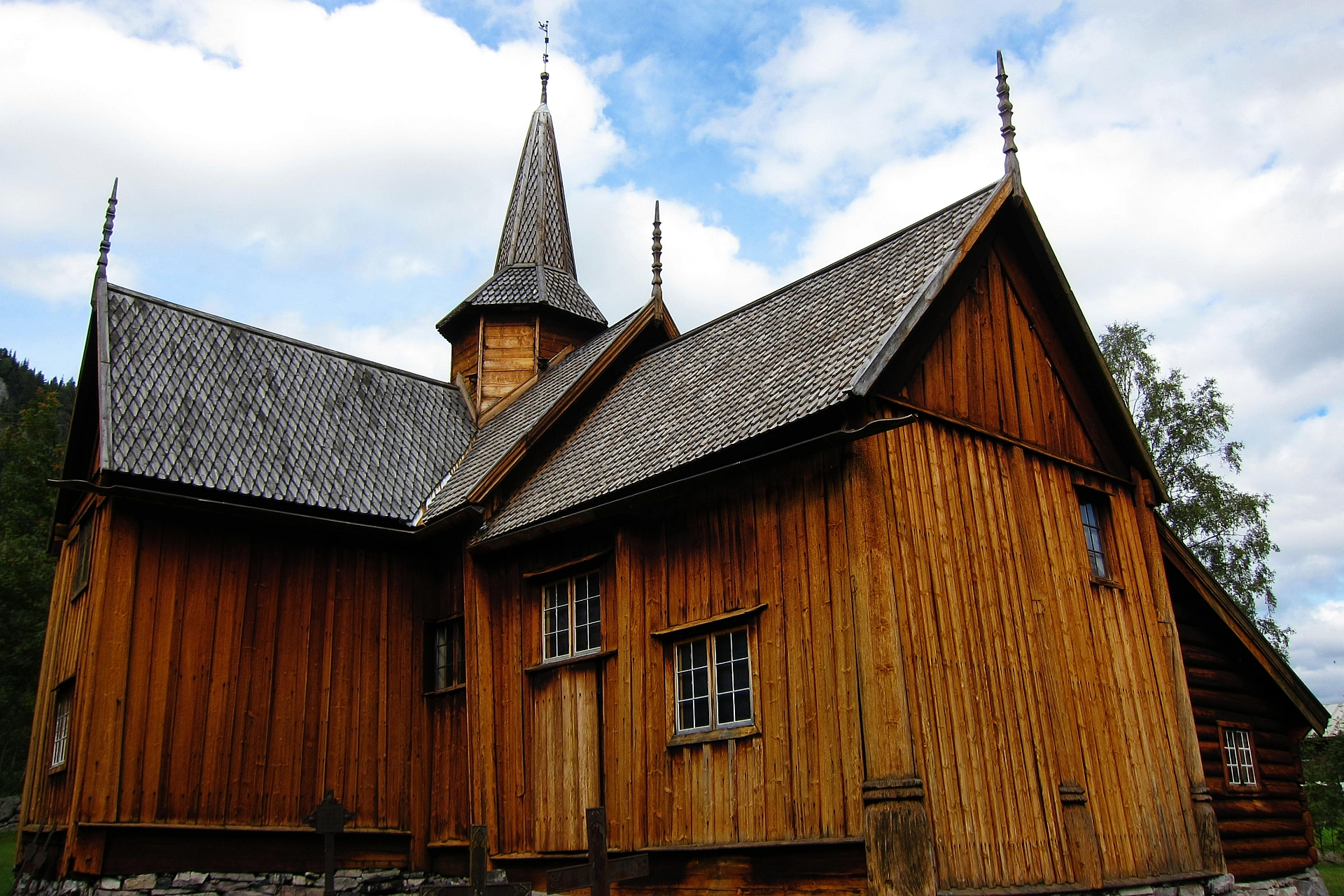

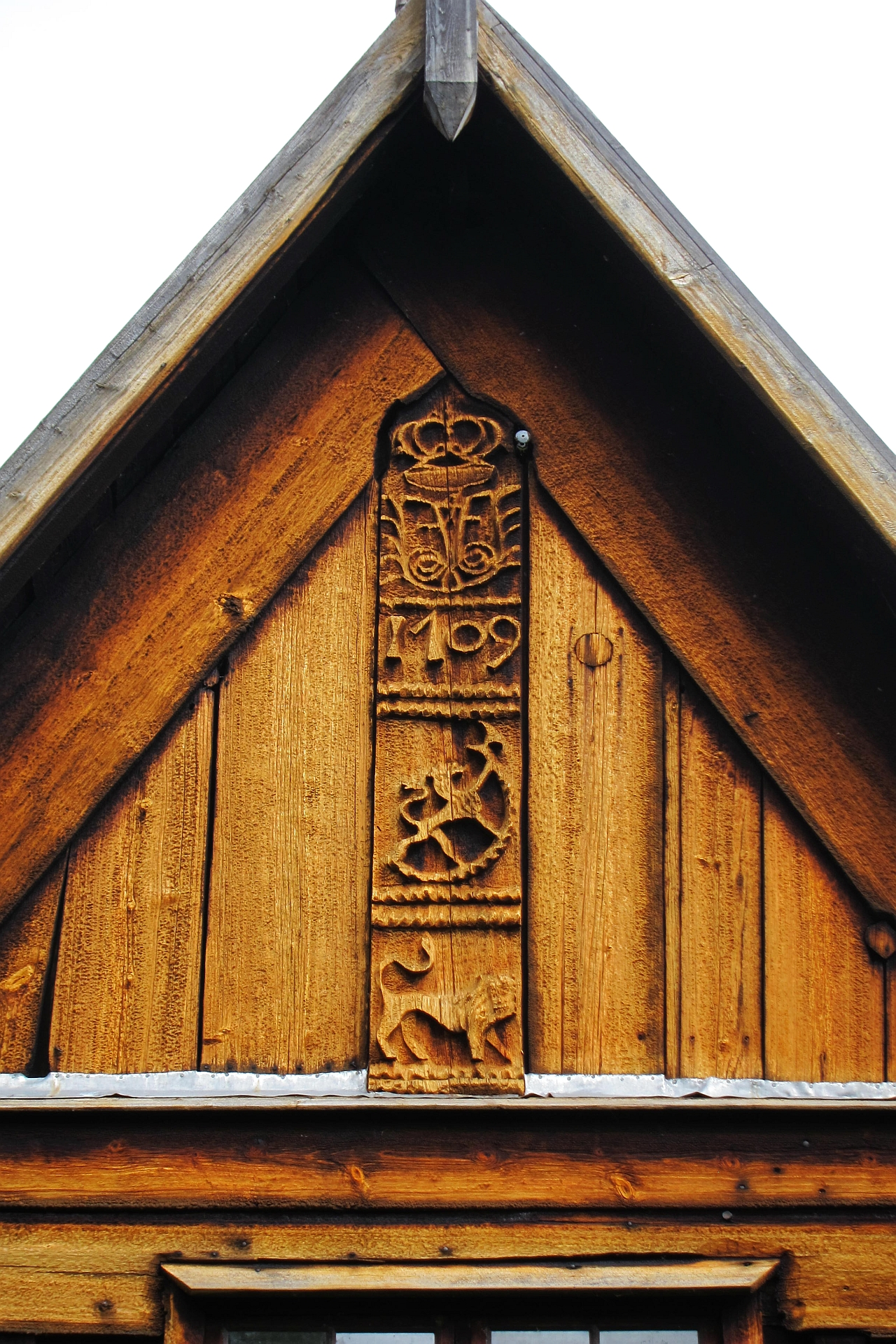

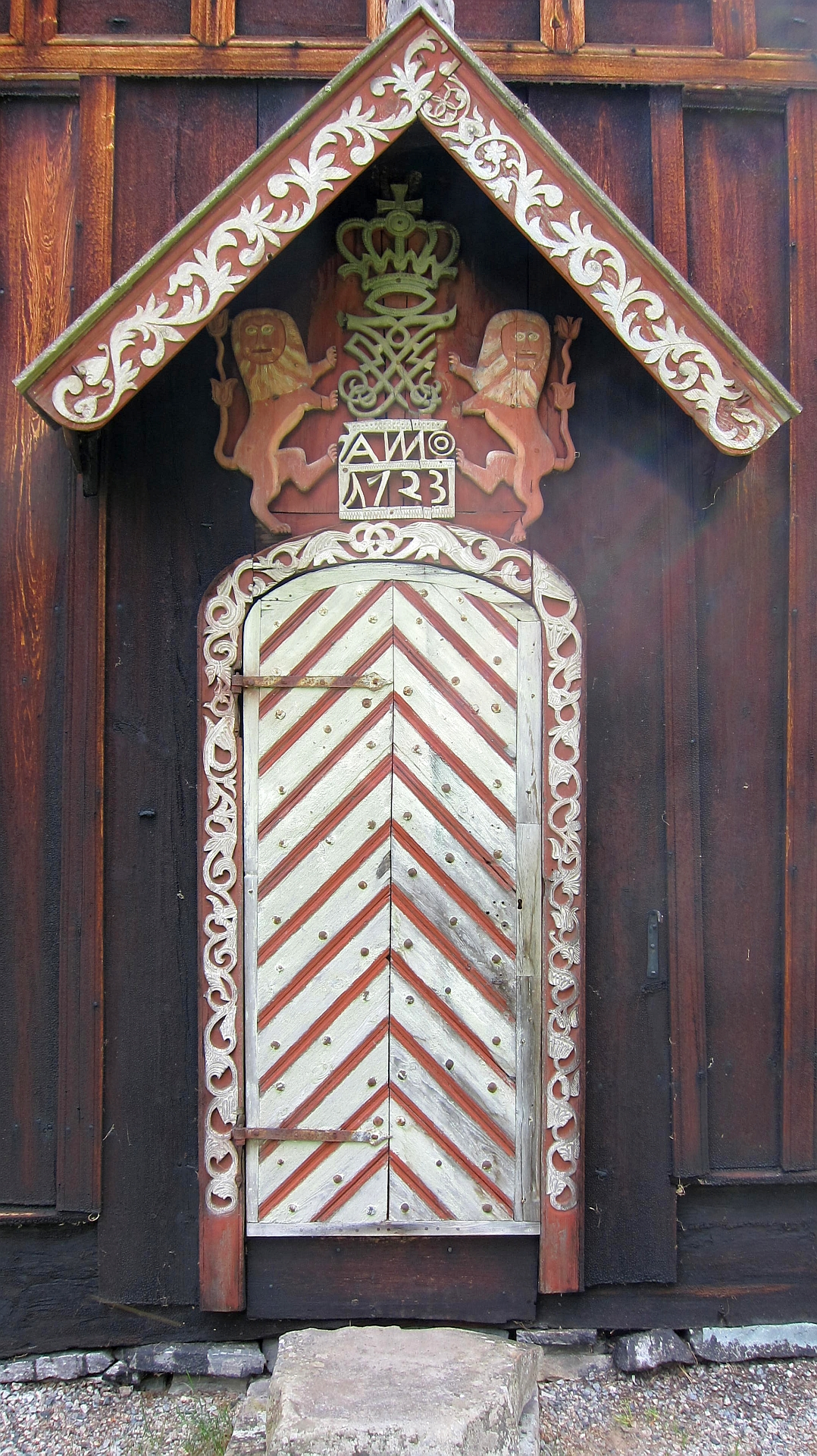

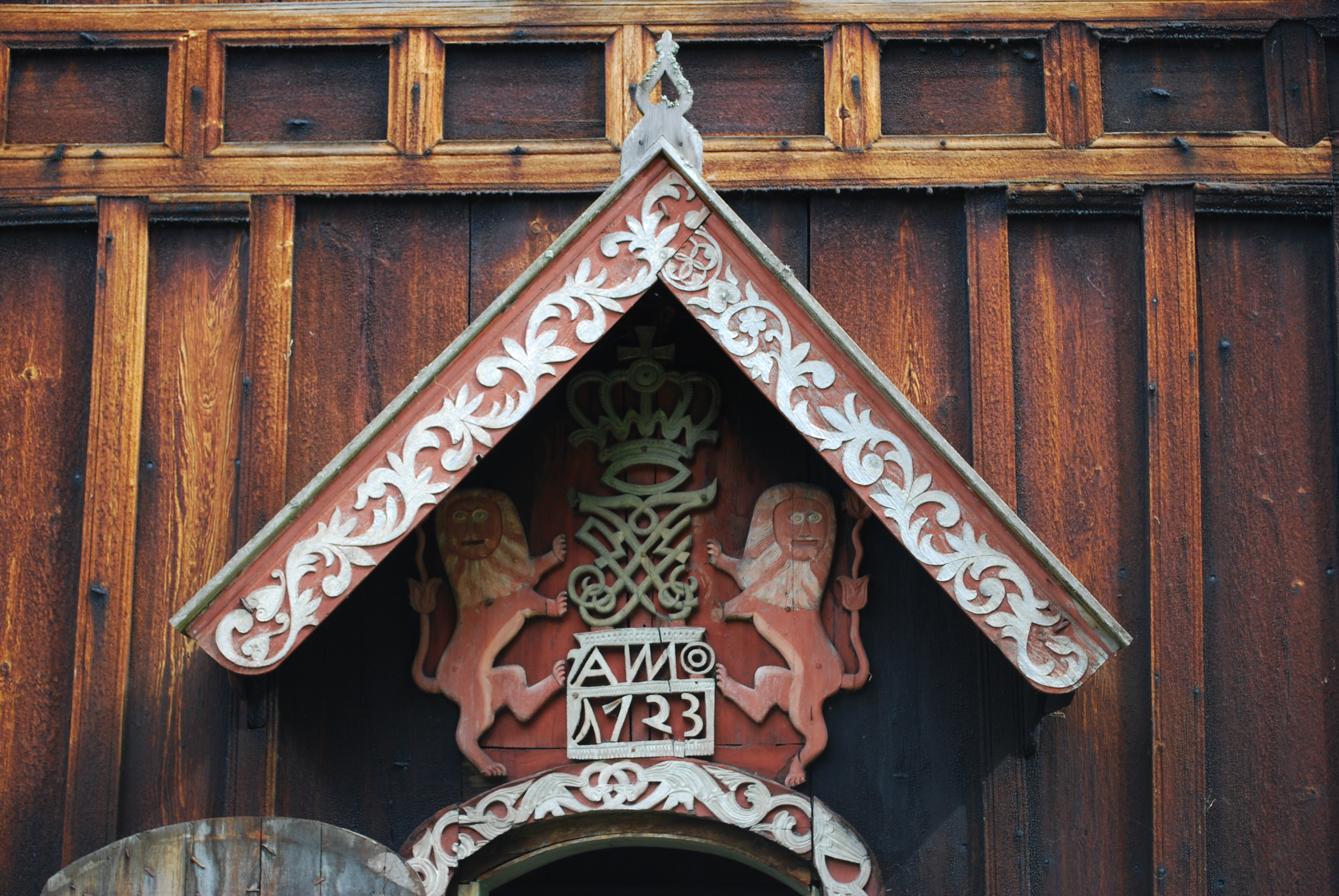

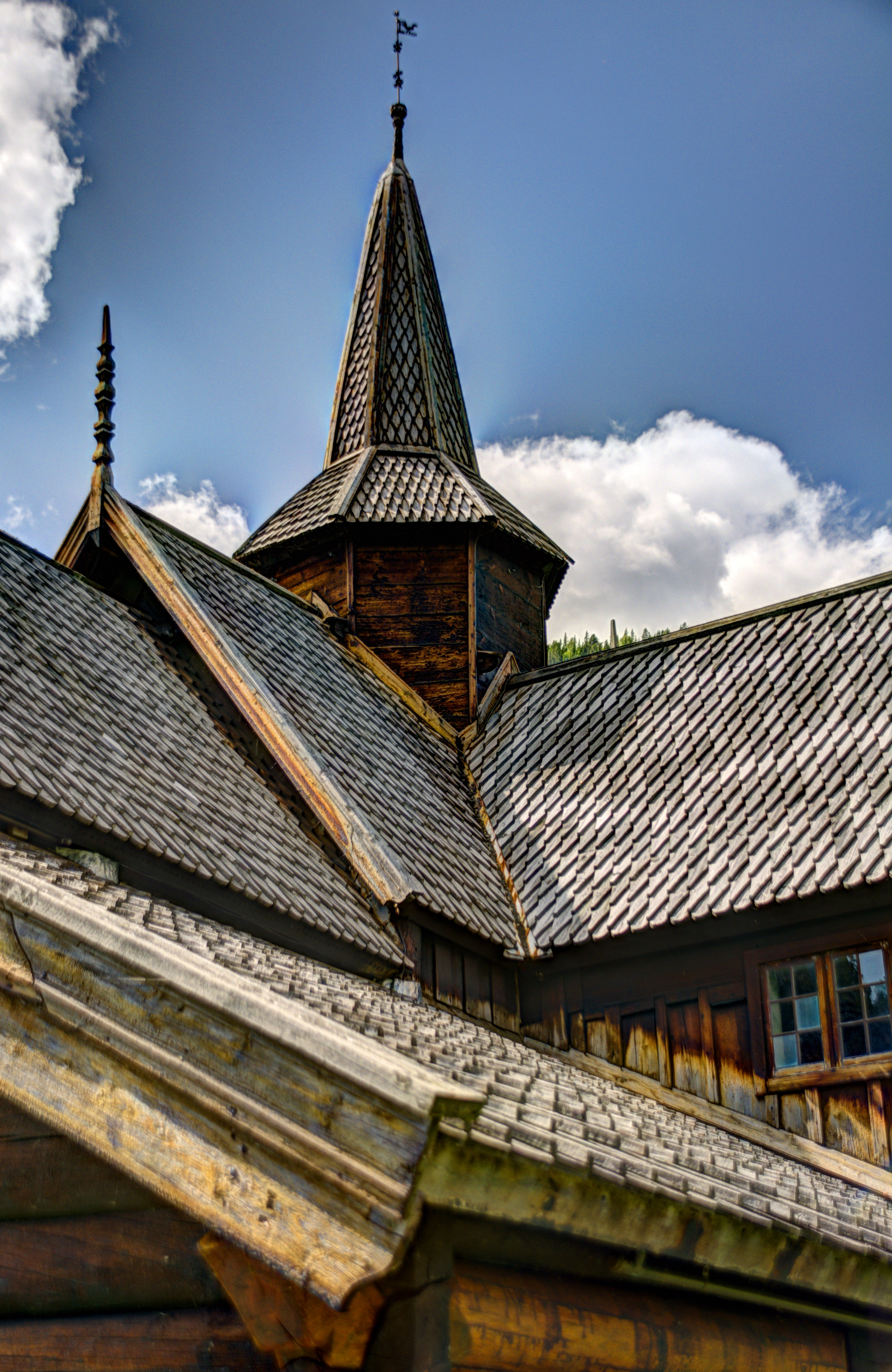

== See also ==
- List of churches in Tunsberg

== Other sources ==
- Leif Anker (2005) The Norwegian Stave Churches (Oslo: Arfo Forlag) ISBN 978-8291399294
