= Hettefjorden =

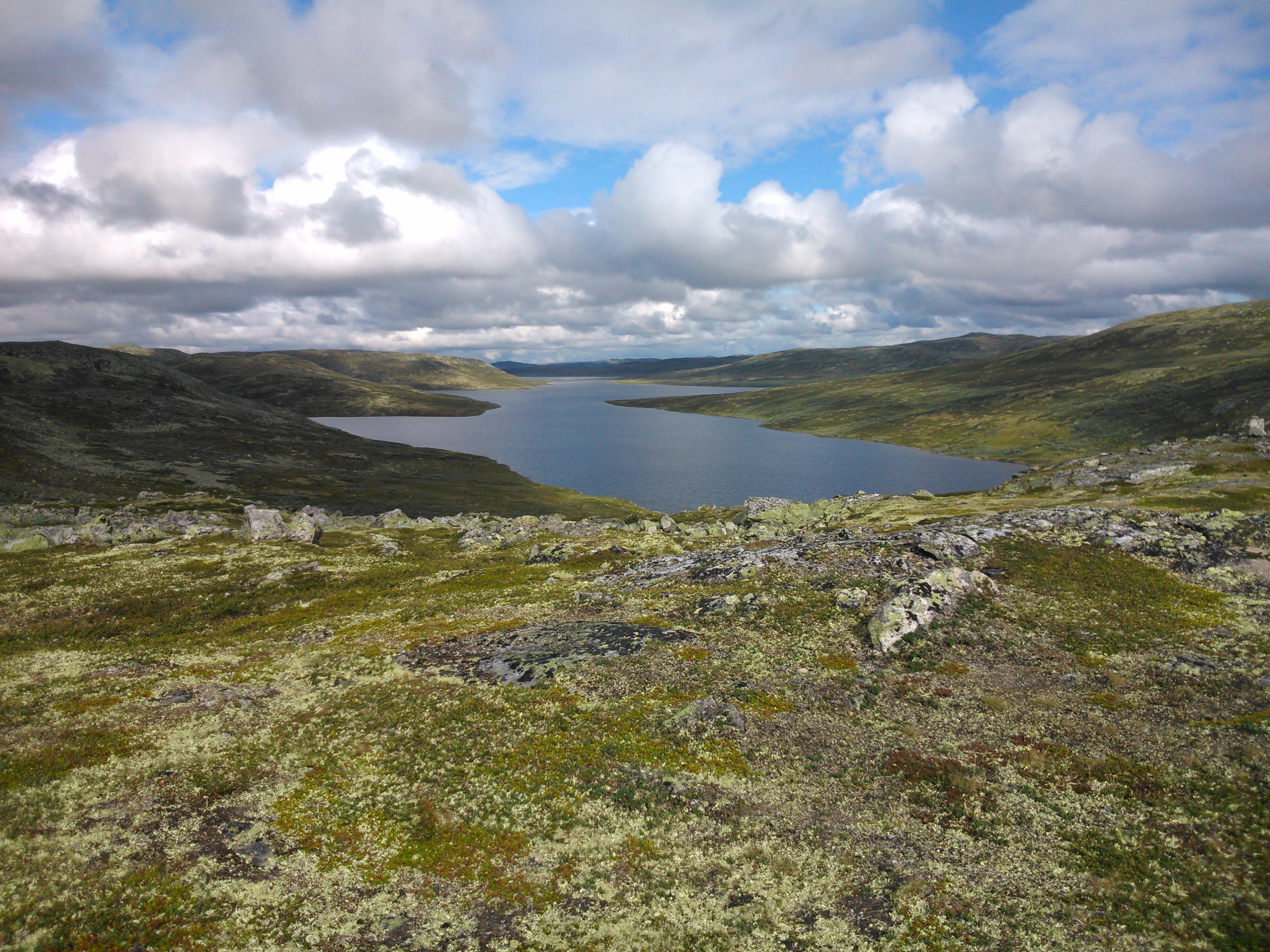

- Location within Buskerud Location within Norway
- Location: Nore og Uvdal (Buskerud)
- Coordinates: 60°10′43″N 8°1′2″E
- Type: natural freshwater lake
- Basin countries: Norway
- Surface area: 2.24 km^{2} (0.86 sq mi)
- Shore length^{1}: 12.58 km (7.82 mi)
- Surface elevation: 1,231 m (4,039 ft)
- References: NVE
- ^{1} Shore length is not a well-defined measure.

Hettefjorden is a lake in the municipality of Nore og Uvdal in Buskerud county, Norway. It is located east on Hardangervidda, just inside the border of Hardangervidda National Park. It is the Skiensvassdraget watershed.

== See also ==
- List of lakes in Norway
