= Rødberg =

Village in Nore og Uvdal, Norway

Coordinates: 60°16′N 08°56′E

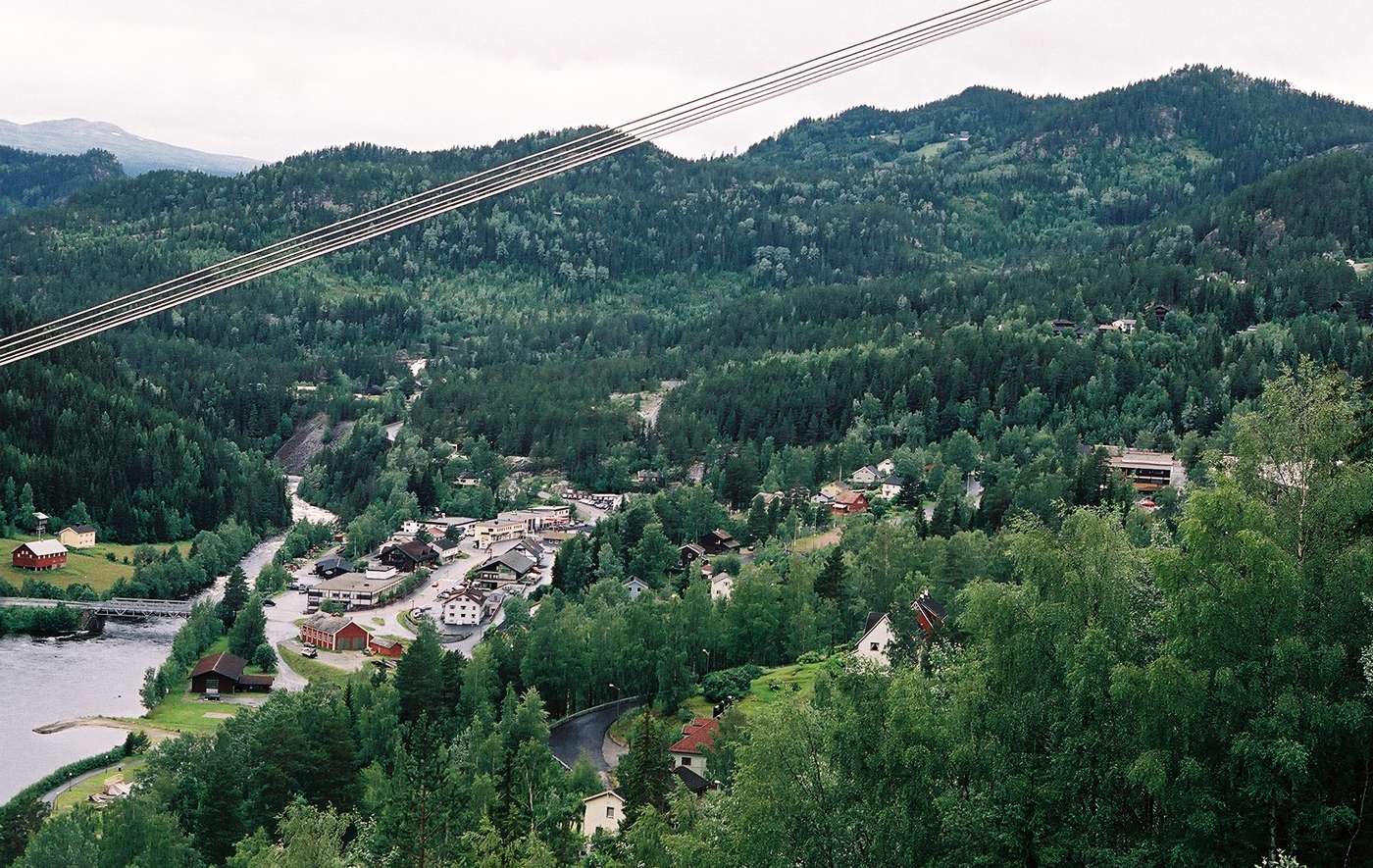
Rødberg

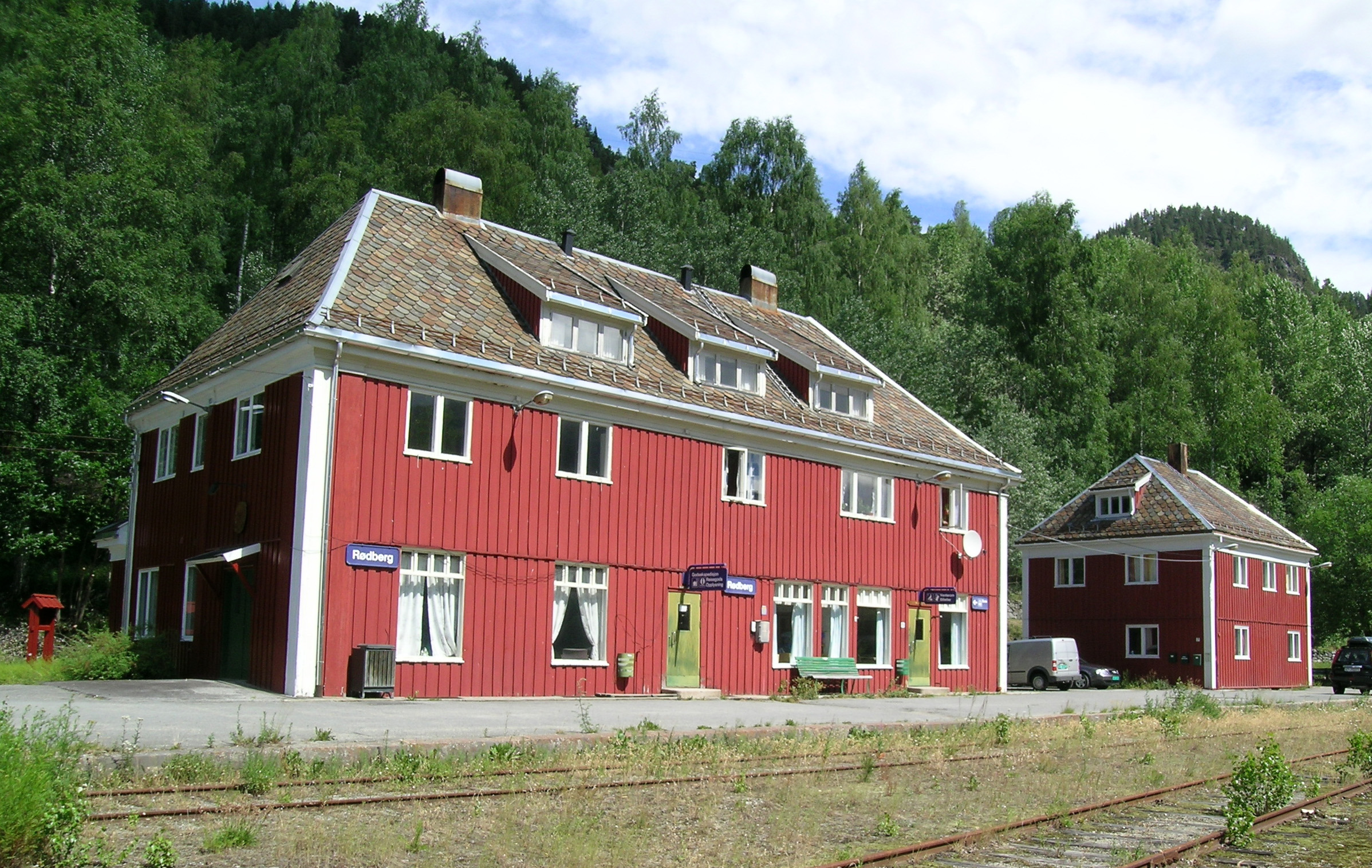
Rødberg Rail Station

Rødberg is the administrative centre of Nore og Uvdal municipality in Buskerud, Norway.

Rødberg is located in the Norwegian traditional district and valley of Numedal. Its population (2005) is 498, and it is located on the Rødberg dam (Norwegian: Rødbergdammen) on the Numedalslågen River.

The local power stations, Rødberg Nore 1 in operation 1928 and Nore 2 in operation since 1946, utilize waterflow from the Rødberg Dam. The plants are affiliated with Statkraft, the Norwegian state owned electricity company.

Rødberg was once a railway station, being the terminal station of the now-defunct Numedal railway line (Numedalsbanen) which ran up the Numedal valley between Kongsberg and Rødberg. The final passenger service ended in 1988. The rail line north of Rollag was closed in 1989. With that being said, it is still possible to travel to Rødberg by rail via Draisine rentals from the nearby town of Veggli.
