= Nore og Uvdal =

Nore og Uvdal Municipality Nore og Uvdal kommune
- Municipality
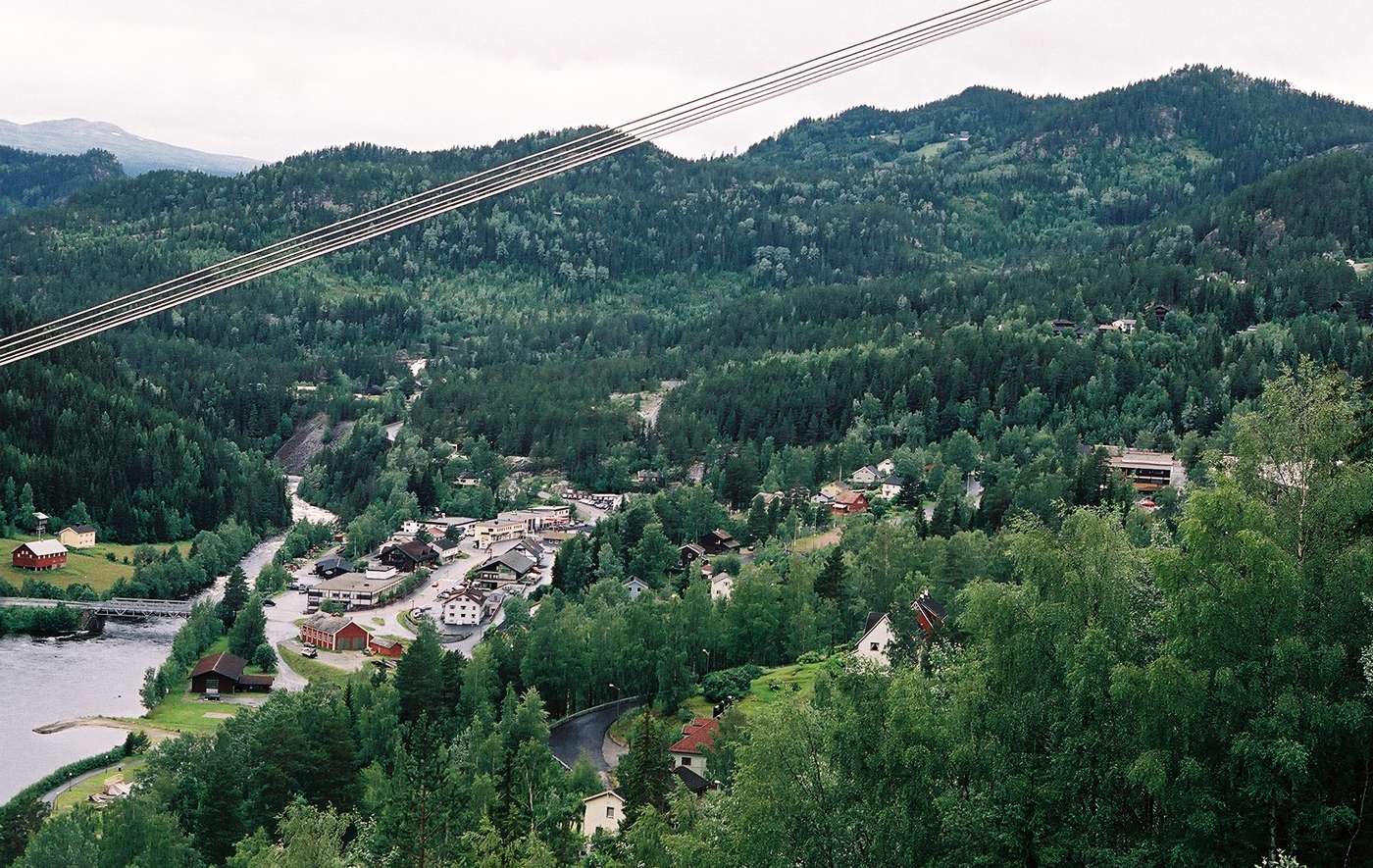

- Coat of arms

- Buskerud within Norway

- Nore og Uvdal within Buskerud
- Coordinates: 60°18′26″N 8°48′20″E
- Country: Norway
- County: Buskerud
- District: Østlandet
- Administrative centre: Rødberg

Government
  - Mayor (2011): Eli Hovd Prestegården (Sp)

Area
  - Total: 2,501 km^{2} (966 sq mi)
  - Land: 2,274 km^{2} (878 sq mi)
  - Rank: #19 in Norway

Population (2004)
  - Total: 2,695
  - Rank: #289 in Norway
  - Density: 1/km^{2} (2.6/sq mi)
  - Change (10 years): ▼ −6.9%
- Demonym: Uvdøl

Official language
  - Norwegian form: Neutral
- Time zone: UTC+01:00 (CET)
  - Summer (DST): UTC+02:00 (CEST)
- ISO 3166 code: NO-3338
- Website: Official website

Nore og Uvdal is a municipality in Buskerud county, Norway. It is part of the traditional region of Numedal. The administrative centre of the municipality is the village of Rødberg.

The area of Nore was separated from Rollag Municipality in 1858. The municipality of Nore was divided into two municipalities on 1 January 1901: Nore Municipality and Uvdal Municipality. These two municipalities were merged back together on 1 January 1962, and the new municipality was called Nore og Uvdal.

== General information ==
=== Name ===
The municipalities of Nore Municipality and Uvdal Municipality were joined together in 1962 into Nore og Uvdal.

The Old Norse form of Nore was Nórar. The name is the plural form of nór which means "narrow sound or strait". The name originally belonged to the vicarage (and church site) at Norefjorden.

The Old Norse form of Uvdal was Uppdalr. The first element is upp meaning "upper" or "high" and the last element is dalr which means "valley" or "dale". The name originally belonged to the vicarage and old church site. Prior to 1933, the name was spelled "Opdal".

=== Coat-of-arms ===
The coat-of-arms is from modern times. It was granted on 26 March 1982. The arms are divided diagonally with the colors green on yellow above the line and yellow on green below. The economy of the municipality is based on agriculture and forestry. Hence the upper half of the arms shows a barn for the storage of grains and the lower half a watermill wheel which was used to saw trees.

Number of minorities (1st and 2nd generation) in Nore og Uvdal by country of origin in 2017
Ancestry	Number
Poland	33
Latvia	26
Lithuania	22
Eritrea	21
Somalia	21

== Geography ==
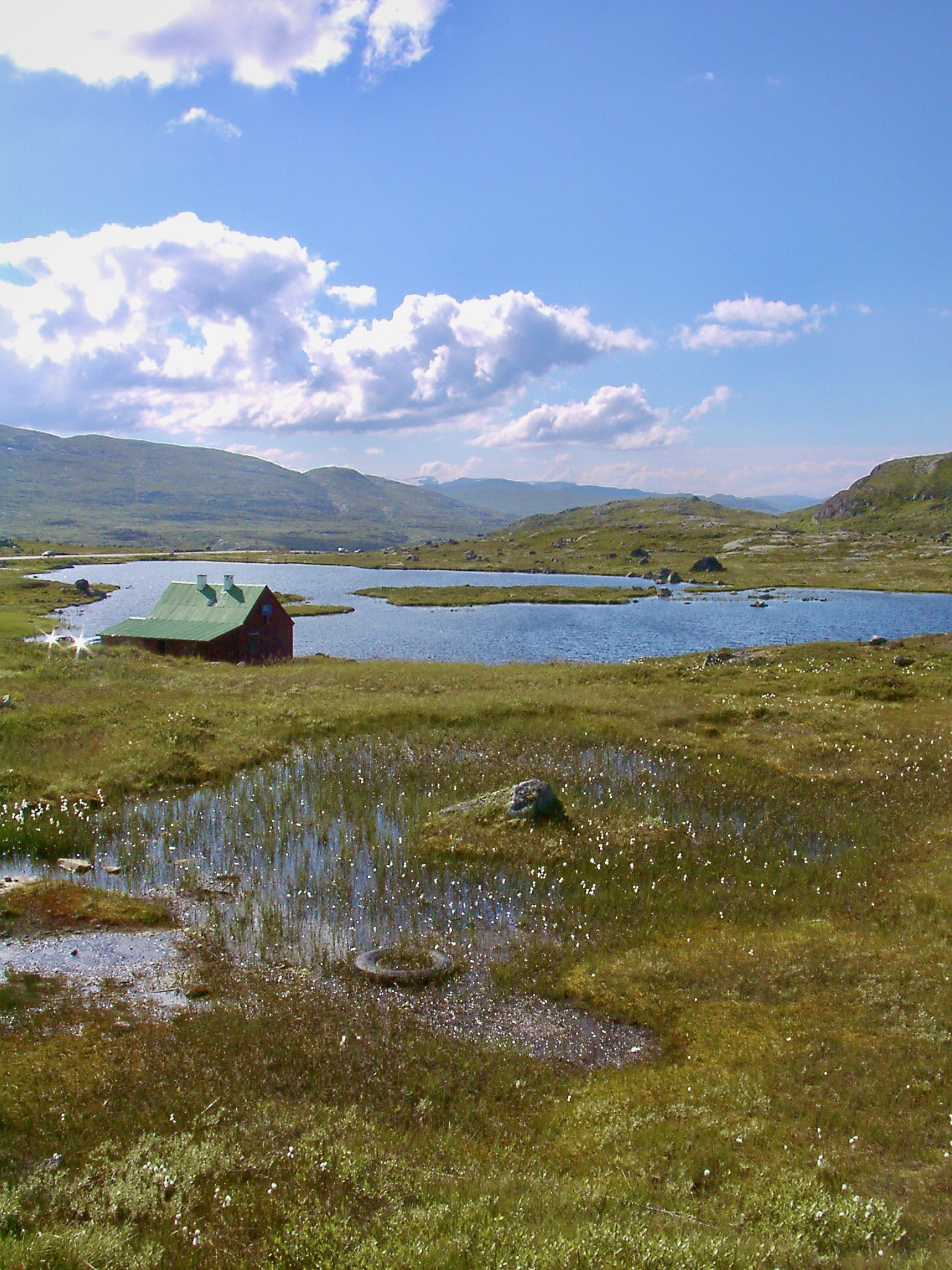
Hardangervidda

The municipal centre is the village of Rødberg. Nore and Uvdal are the two other villages in the municipality.

Nore og Uvdal Municipality is bordered in the north by Hol Municipality, Ål Municipality, and Nesbyen Municipality; in the east by Flå Municipality and Sigdal Municipality; in the south by Rollag Municipality, Tinn Municipality, and Vinje Municipality (the latter two in Telemark county); and in the west by Eidfjord Municipality (in Vestland county).

The municipality is located at the top of the valley and traditional district of Numedal, with a widely spread area of 2,505 square kilometres (967 mi^{2}). The municipality's highest point is the Borgsjåbrot mountain at 1,485 metres (4,872 ft). It is located on the border with Tinn Municipality in Telemark county. A large part of the Hardangervidda lies within the municipality's borders.

Lakes in the municipality include Geitsjøen and Hettefjorden.

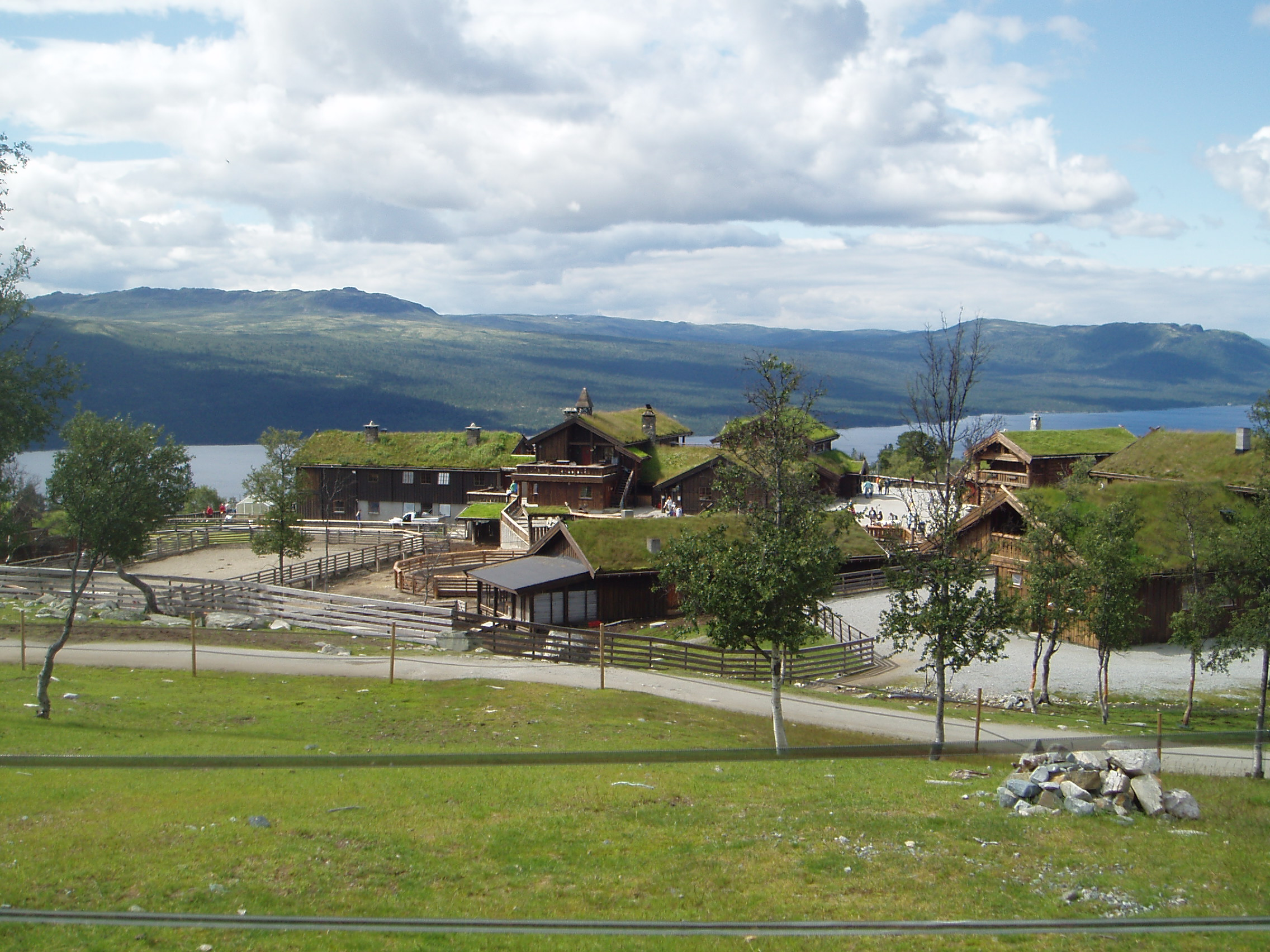
Langedrag Naturpark

== Attractions ==
- Langedrag Naturpark (Langedrag Nature Park) - a resort in the mountain focusing on ecology and animals
- Uvdal Skisenter - alpine resort located in Uvdal
- Uvdal Alpinpark - alpine resort located in Uvdal, on the other side of the valley
- Nore Stave Church - built around 1166 - 1200
- Uvdal Stave Church - originally constructed just after the year 1168

== Notable people ==
- Johnny Lunde (1923 in Nore – 2013) an alpine skier and engineer, participated at the 1948 and 1952 Winter Olympics
- Frode Thingnæs (1940 in Nore og Uvdal – 2012) a Norwegian jazz composer, arranger, conductor and trombone player

== Sister cities ==
The following cities are twinned with Nore og Uvdal:

- Juupajoki, Western Finland, Finland
- Surahammar, Västmanland County, Sweden
- Wahlstedt, Schleswig-Holstein, Germany

== Gallery ==
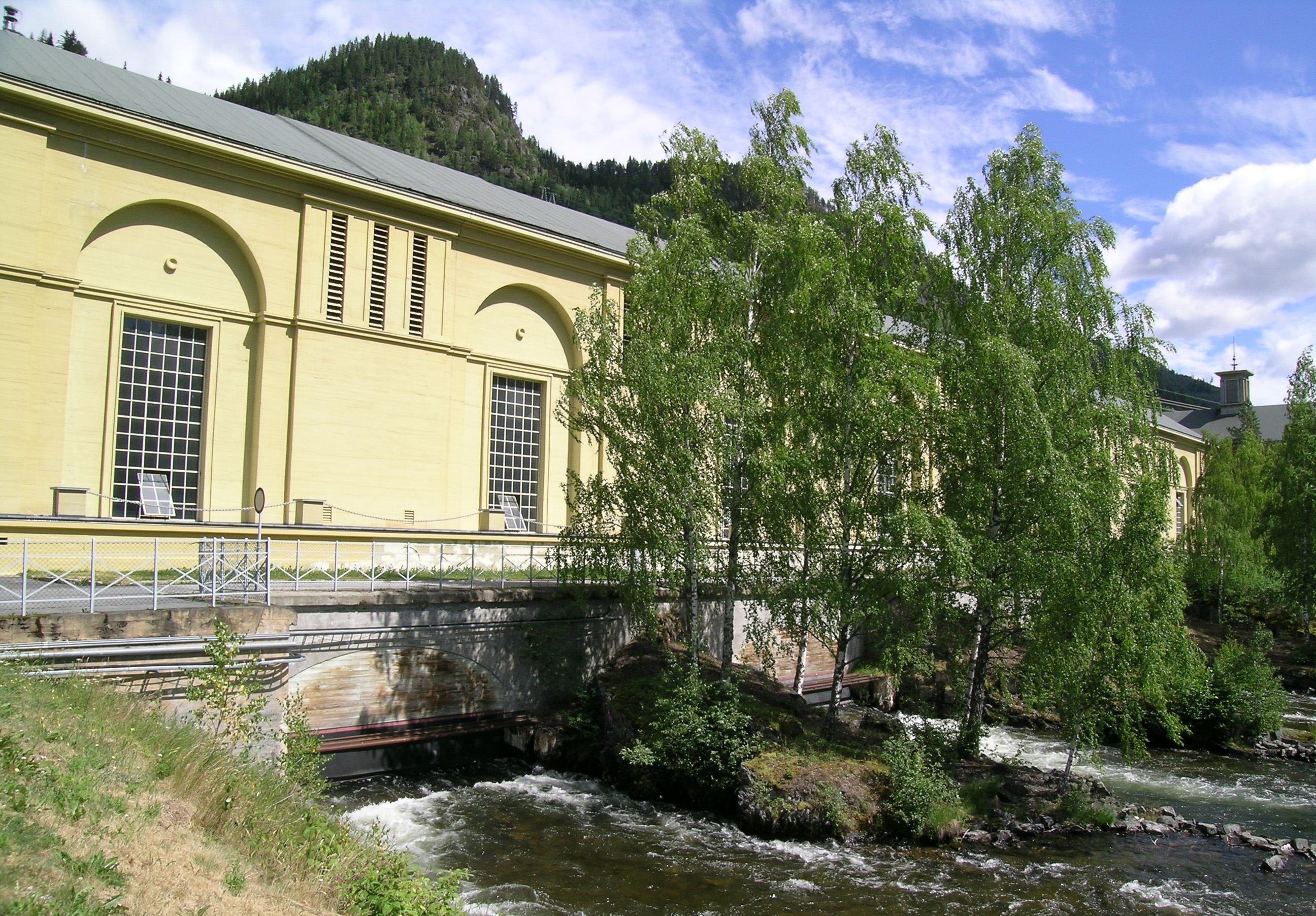
Nore I hydropower plant

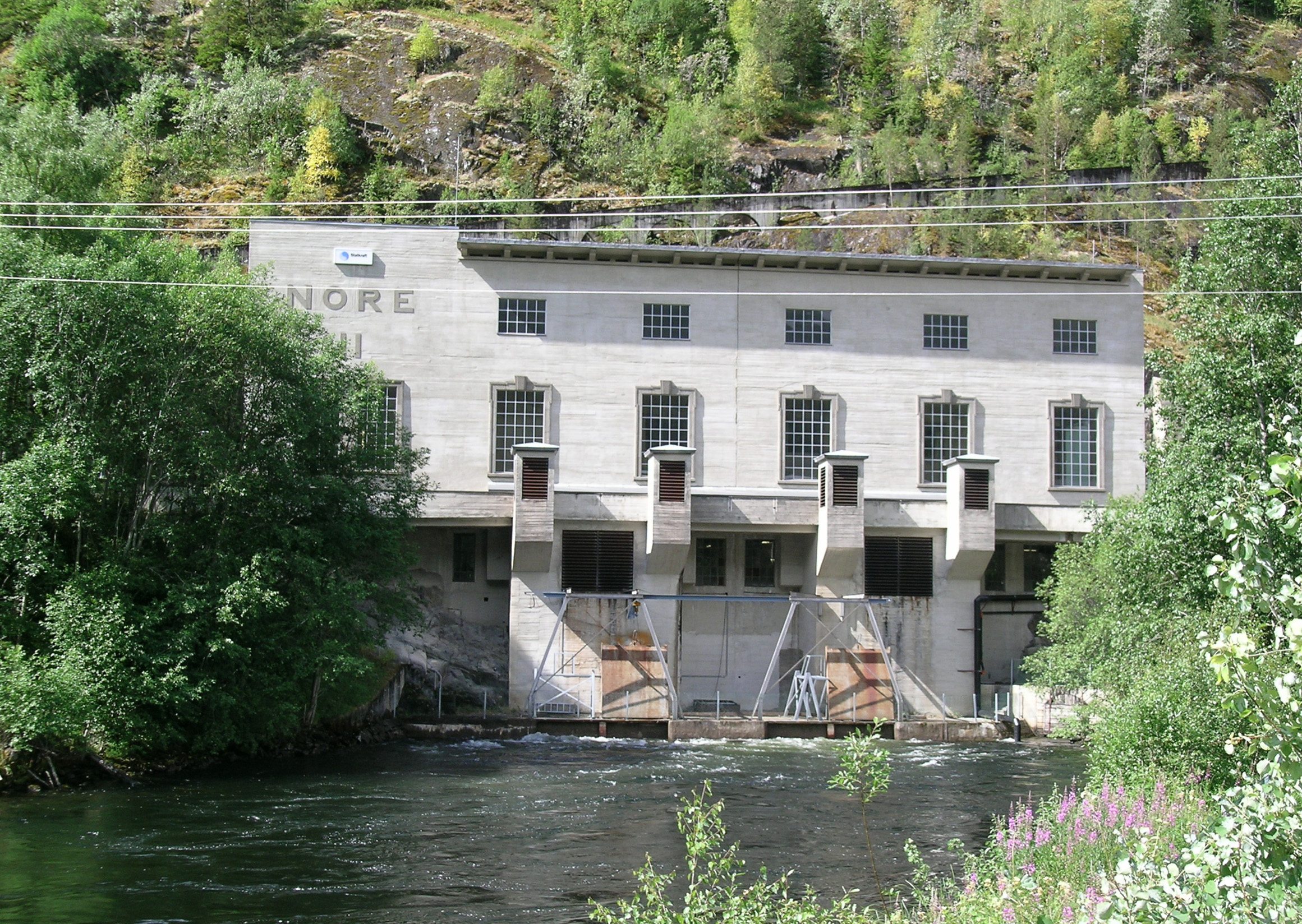
Nore II hydropower plant

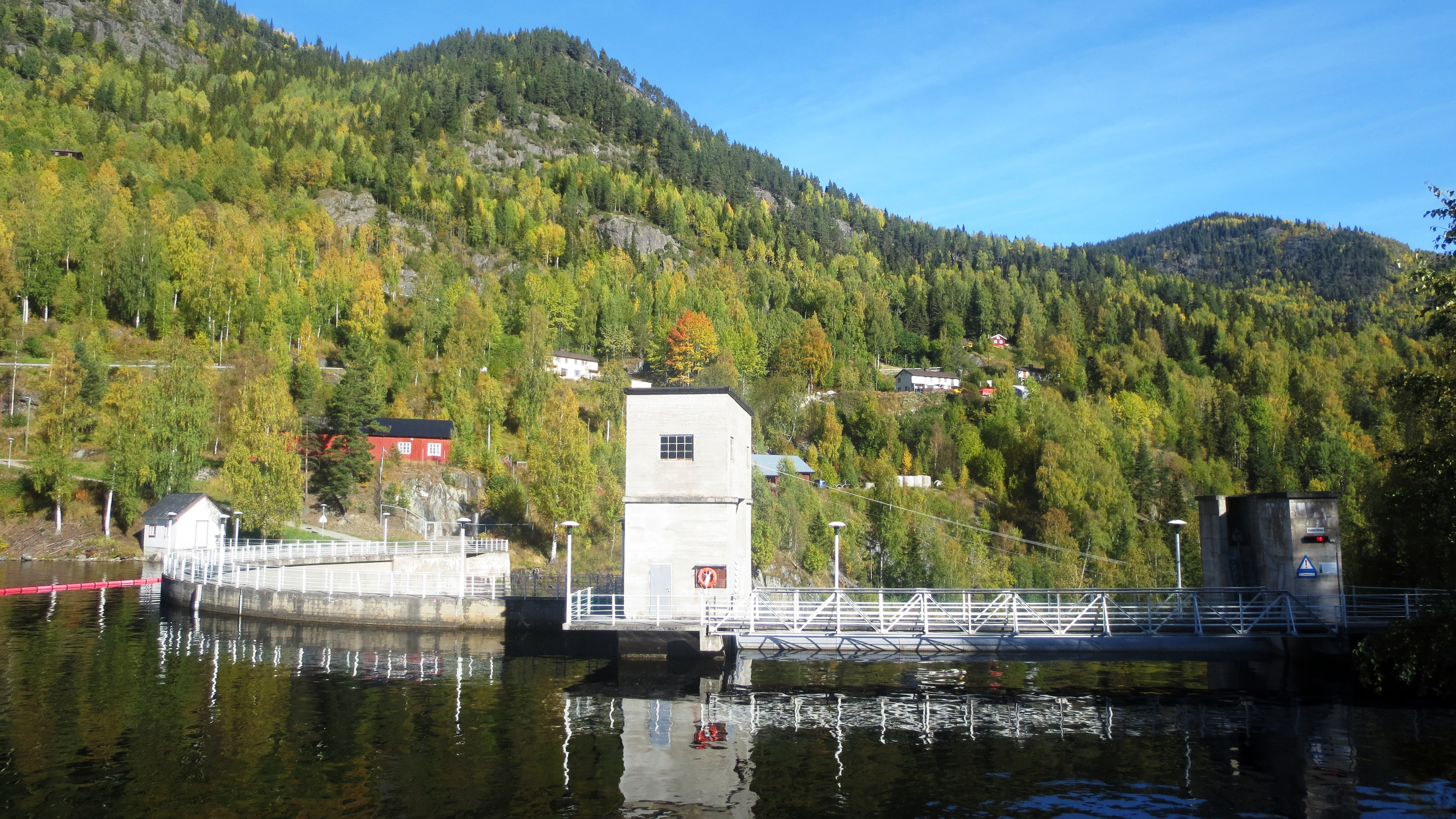
Rødbergdammen in Rødberg

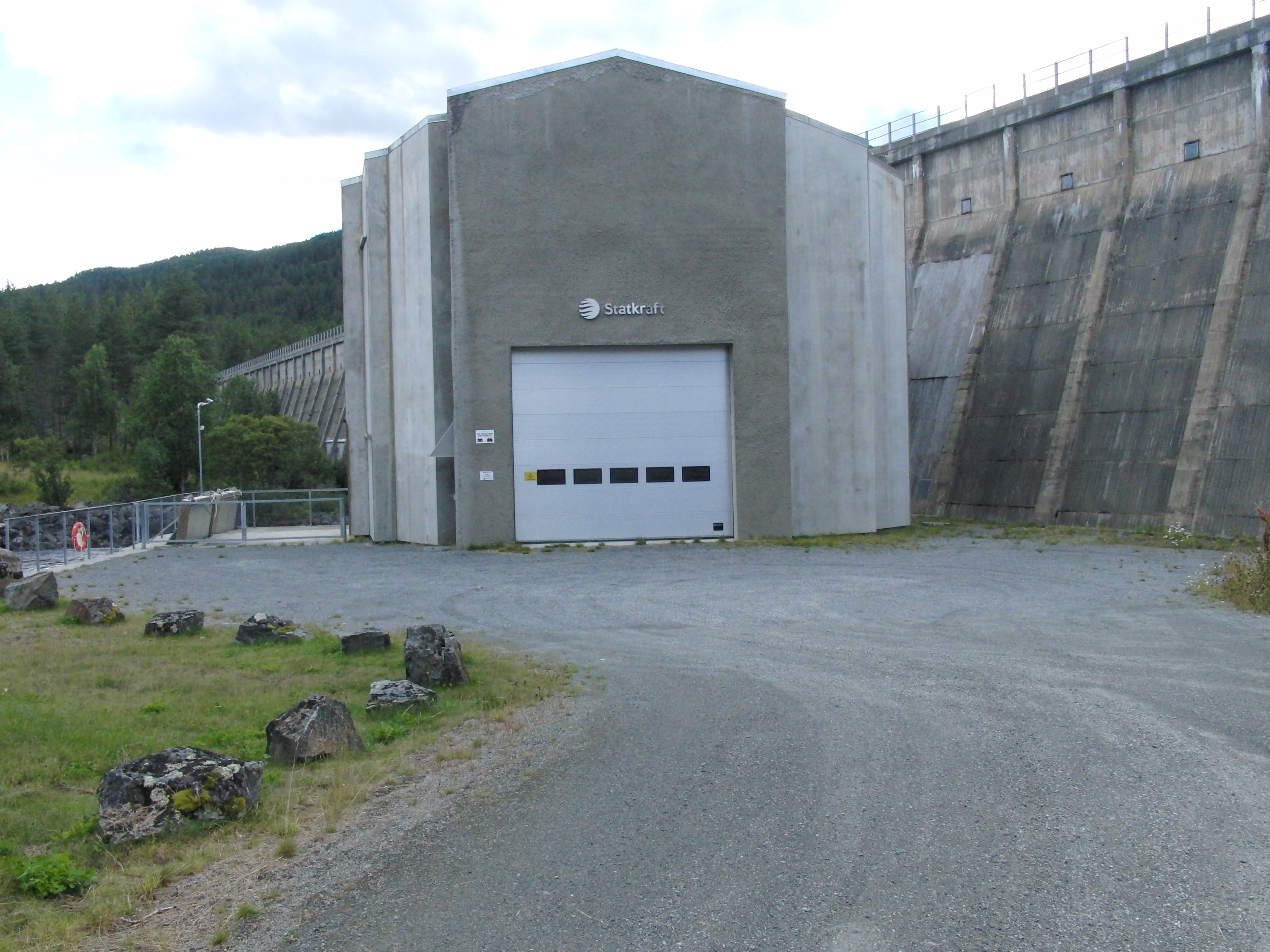
Pålsbu kraftverk hydropower plant

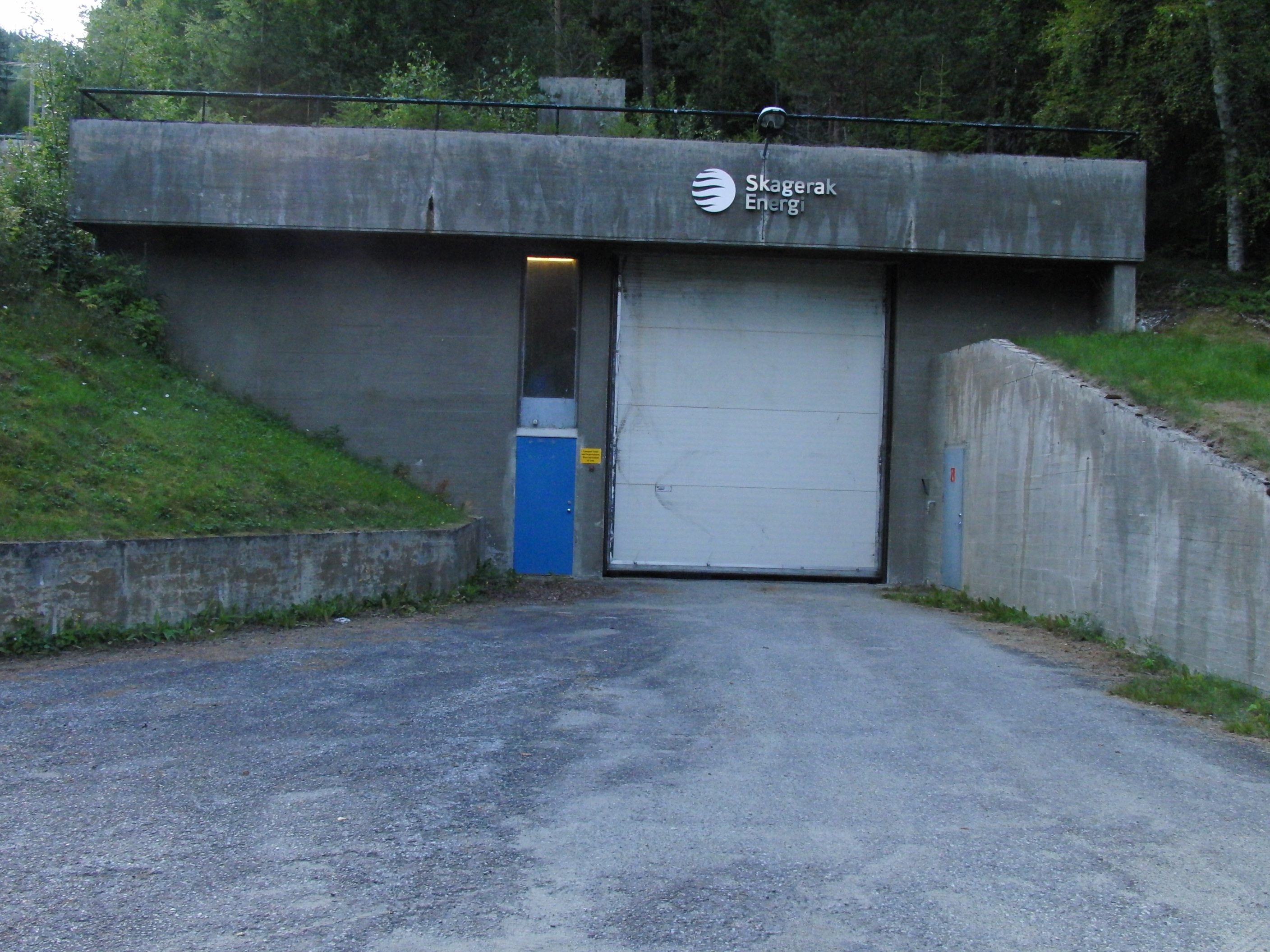
Uvdal II kraftverk hydropower plant

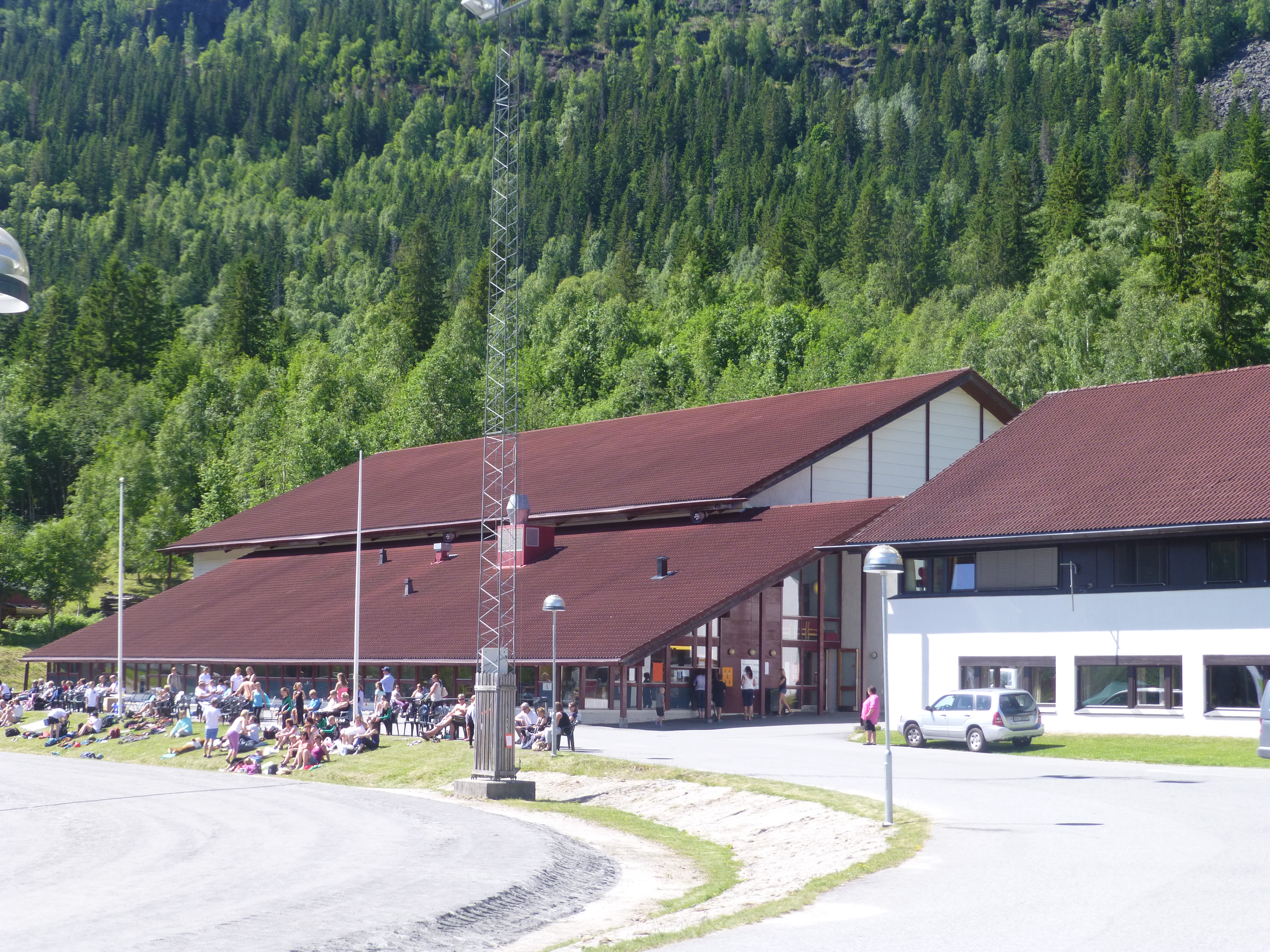
Numedal High School

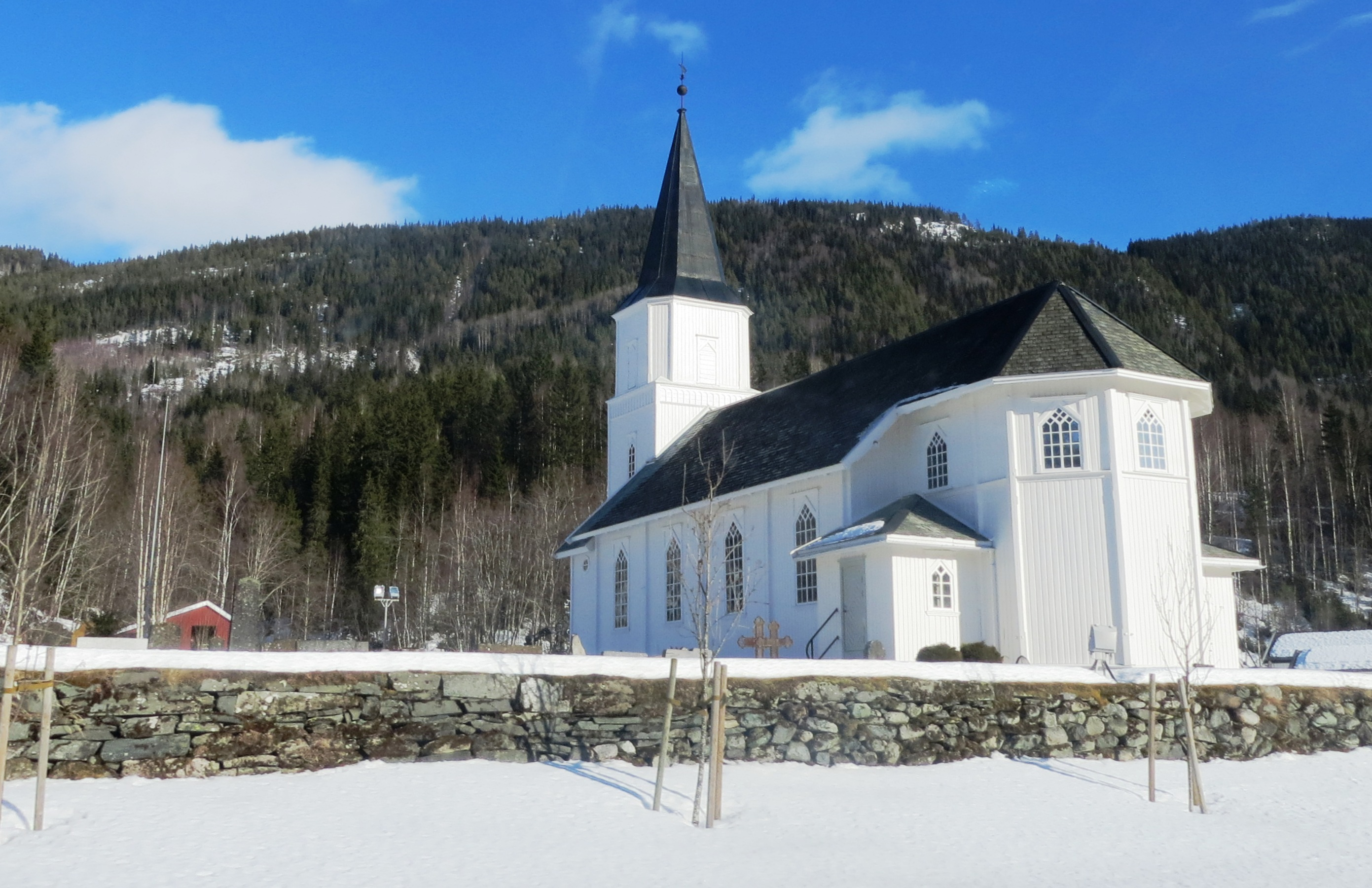
Skjønne Church
