= Nore, Norway =

Village in Buskerud, Norway

Coordinates: 60.168°N 9.007°E

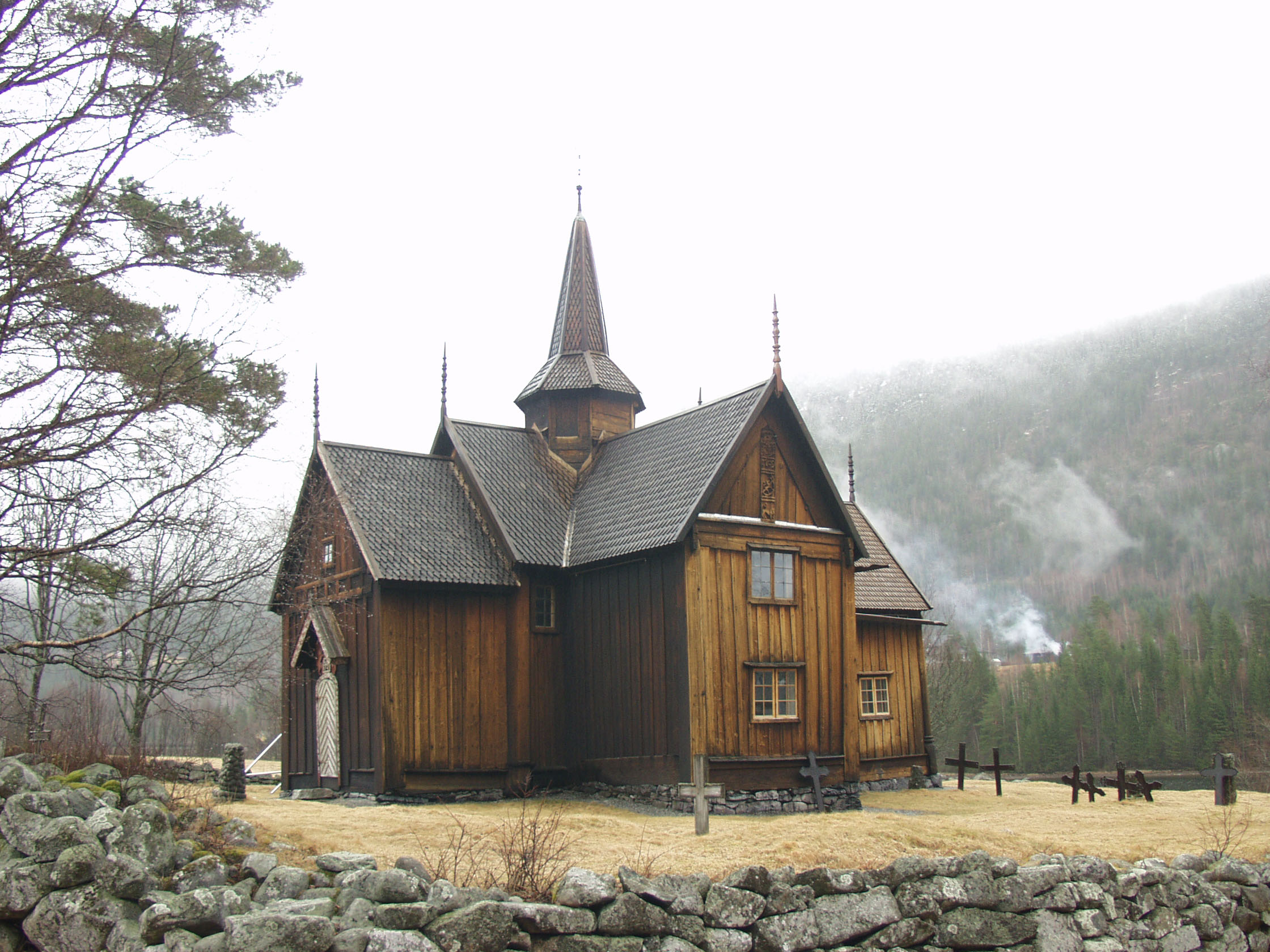
Nore Stave Church

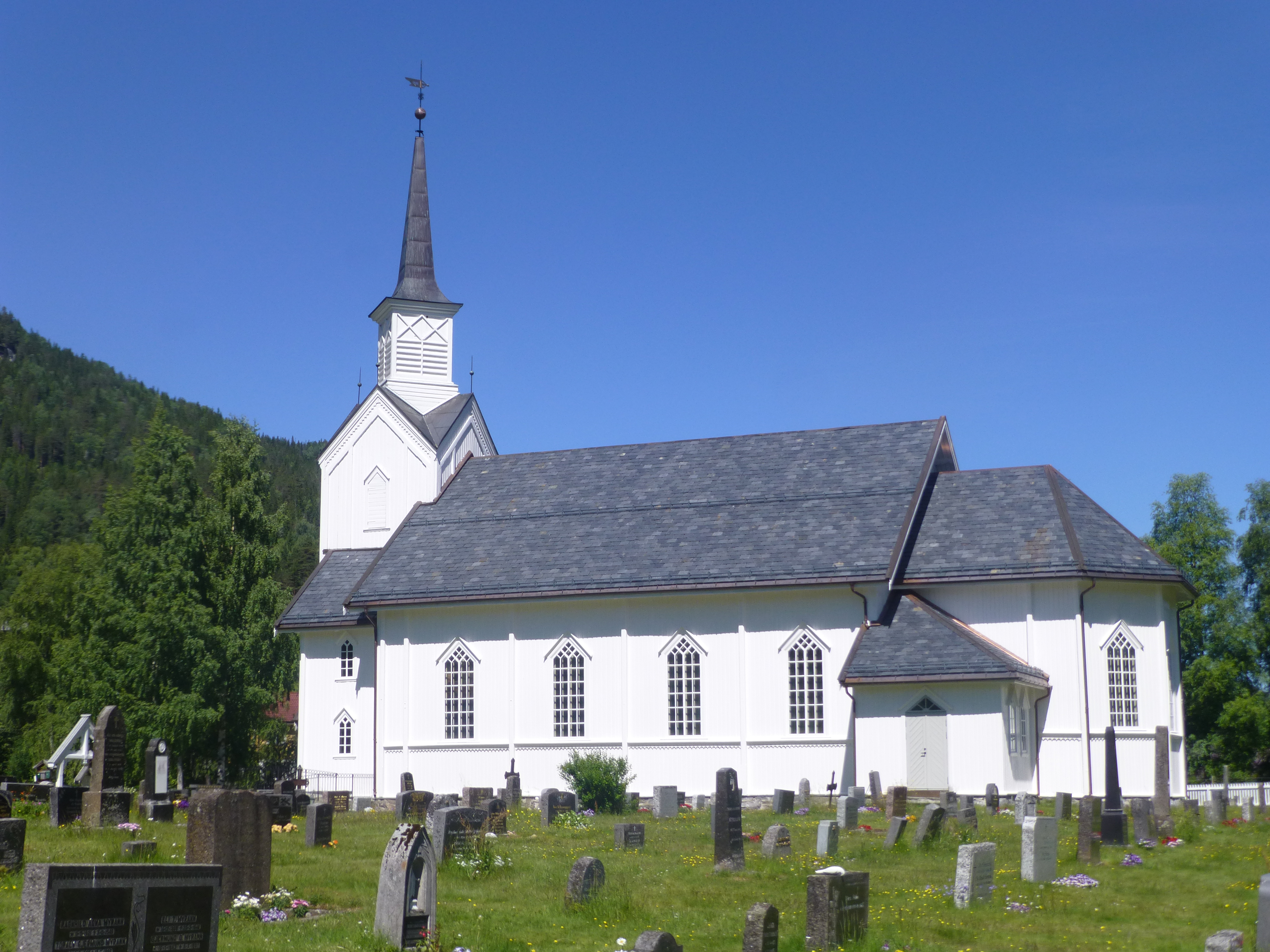
Nore Church

Nore is a village in the municipality of Nore og Uvdal in the county of Buskerud, Norway. It is located in the traditional region of Numedal.

== History ==
From 1837 the area was part of Rollag District. Nore was a municipality of its own from 1858 to 1961. It was merged with Uvdal on 1 January 1962. Prior to the merger Nore municipality had a population of 1,975.

Norefjord is the center of the Nore. There is Numedal Hall, Numedal high school, Nore school and community center. During the summer months there is an open exhibition at the former residence of glass artist, Oddmund Kristiansen (1920-1997). During the final twenty years of his life, the renowned glass artist used his house as a workshop and studio.

Nore Stave Church (Nore stavkirke) dating from the 1100-1200 time period is located in Nore. Nore Stave Church is located just south of downtown. The church, which is characteristic of stave churches of Numedal type, has wood carvings from the Middle Ages in the form of leaf vines and man-eating lions and is decorated with wall paintings dating from 1600 to 1700.

Nore Church (Nore kirke) was built as a replacement for Nore Stave Church. Architect Jacob Wilhelm Nordan prepared drawings for the new church at Nore prestegård which was opened on October 5, 1880. The original intention was to tear down the stave church, but Professor Lorentz Dietrichson took the initiative in favor of conservation. In 1888, it was handed over to the Society for the Preservation of Ancient Norwegian Monuments (Fortidsminneforeningen), which also owned the Uvdal stave church.

== Notable residents ==
- Lars Larsen Solaas (1929- 2011) painter
- Oddmund Kristiansen (1920-1997) glass artist

== Other sources ==
- Anker, Leif (2005) Kirker i Norge (Oslo) ISBN 82-91399-16-6
- Anker, Peter (1997) Stavkirkene deres egenart og historie (Oslo) ISBN 82-02-15978-4
