= Lyngdal =

Lyngdal may refer to:

== Places ==
- Lyngdal (town), a town within Lyngdal Municipality in Agder county, Norway
- Lyngdal Municipality, a municipality in Agder county, Norway
- Lyngdal, Buskerud, a village in Flesberg Municipality in Buskerud county, Norway
- Lyngdal Church (Agder), a church in Lyngdal Municipality in Agder county, Norway
- Lyngdal Church (Buskerud), a church in Flesberg Municipality in Buskerud county, Norway

== Other ==
- Lyngdal IL, a sports club based in Lyngdal Municipality in Agder county, Norway
- Lyngdal District Court, a former district court in the old Vest-Agder county, Norway
