= Svene Church =

Church in Buskerud, Norway

- Svene kirke
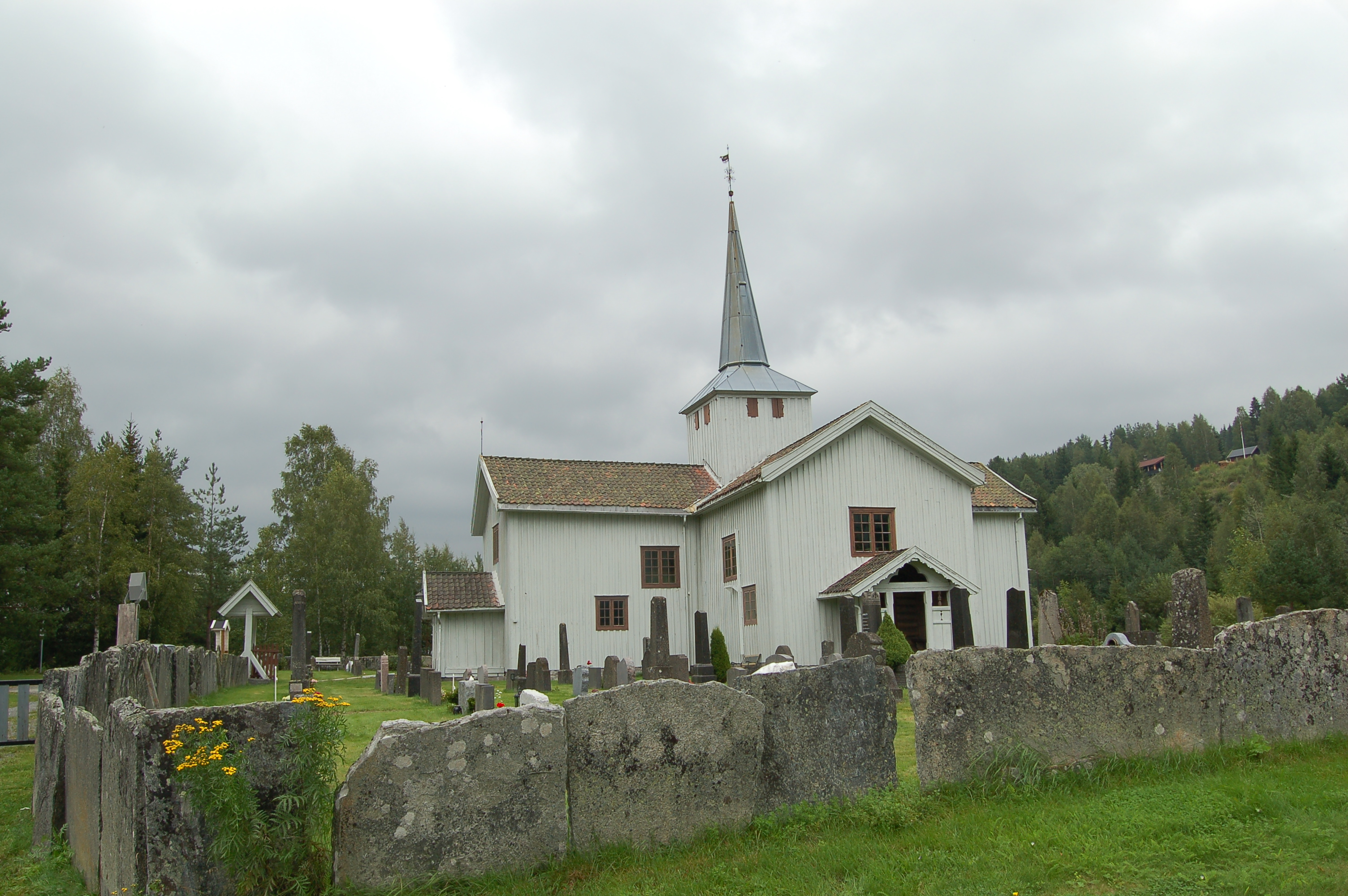
- View of the church
- Svene Church
- 59°47′57″N 9°34′56″E
- Location: Flesberg Municipality, Buskerud
- Country: Norway
- Denomination: Church of Norway
- Previous denomination: Catholic Church
- Churchmanship: Evangelical Lutheran

History
- Status: Parish church
- Founded: 13th-century
- Consecrated: 1738

Architecture
- Functional status: Active
- Architectural type: Cruciform
- Completed: 1738 (288 years ago)

Specifications
- Capacity: 280
- Materials: Wood

Administration
- Diocese: Tunsberg
- Deanery: Kongsberg prosti
- Parish: Svene
- Norwegian Cultural Heritage Site
- Type: Church
- Status: Automatically protected
- ID: 85014

Svene Church (Norwegian: Svene kirke) is a parish church of the Church of Norway in Flesberg Municipality in Buskerud county, Norway. It is located in the village of Svene. It is the church for the Svene parish which is part of the Kongsberg prosti (deanery) in the Diocese of Tunsberg. The white, wooden church was built in a cruciform design in 1738 using plans drawn up by the architect . The church seats about 280 people.

== History ==
The earliest existing historical records of the church date back to the year 1328, but the church was not built that year. The first church in Svene was by all accounts a wooden stave church, but there is no depiction or description of it. The church was possibly built during the 13th century. In the 1660s the church is reported to be in poor condition, so in 1738 it was torn down and replaced by a new building on the same site. The new church building is a wooden cruciform design in log construction. It has a sacristy between the eastern and northern transepts. The eastern transept consists of the choir, and there is a transept partition (from the 19th century) in the form of a low counter on each side of the aisle. The western and southern transepts have second floor seating galleries.

== Media gallery ==
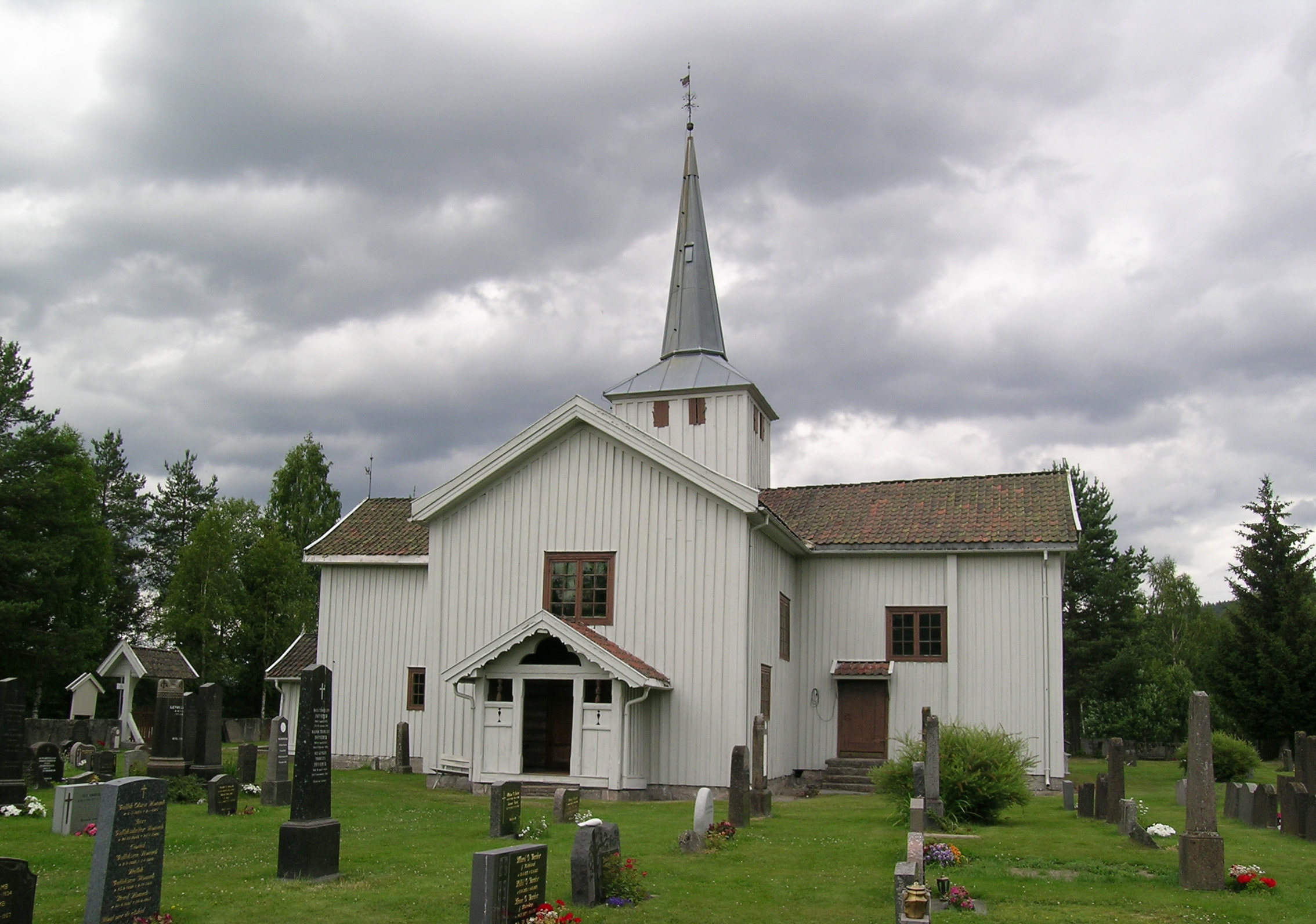

== See also ==
- List of churches in Tunsberg
