= Lyngdal Church (Buskerud) =

Church in Buskerud, Norway

- Lyngdal kirke
- View of the church
- Lyngdal Church
- 59°54′38″N 9°31′43″E
- Location: Flesberg Municipality, Buskerud
- Country: Norway
- Denomination: Church of Norway
- Churchmanship: Evangelical Lutheran

History
- Status: Parish church
- Founded: 1697
- Consecrated: 30 Sept 1701

Architecture
- Functional status: Active
- Architectural type: Cruciform
- Completed: 1697 (329 years ago)

Specifications
- Capacity: 180
- Materials: Wood

Administration
- Diocese: Tunsberg
- Deanery: Kongsberg prosti
- Parish: Lyngdal
- Norwegian Cultural Heritage Site
- Type: Church
- Status: Automatically protected
- ID: 84351

Lyngdal Church (Norwegian: Lyngdal kirke) is a parish church of the Church of Norway in Flesberg Municipality in Buskerud county, Norway. It is located in the village of Lyngdal. It is the church for the Lyngdal parish which is part of the Kongsberg prosti (deanery) in the Diocese of Tunsberg. The white, wooden church was built in a cruciform design in 1697 using plans drawn up by an unknown architect. The church seats about 180 people.

== History ==
The earliest existing historical records of the church date back to the year 1595, but the church was not built that year. On his visitation journey in 1595 from Sigdal to Flesberg, Bishop Jens Nilssøn noted that just north of the Berg farm in Lyngdal lies the small wooden Kampestadt chapel, where no one serves". This is referring to an old medieval church that had fallen into disuse in Kampestad. The old church was built of wood and was probably a stave church. It is only known from the information from 1595 and the church was probably torn down in the 17th century. It is possible that the church was abandoned after the Black Death and it sat unused and decaying for a long time.

The current church was originally built as a long church at the end of the 17th century, probably in 1697. It is possible that it was built on the same site as the medieval building. The church was formally consecrated on 30 September 1701. In 1736, the choir of this church was demolished and three new transepts were built to create a cruciform design. The old nave now forms the western transept and the eastern transept became the new choir.

In 1814, this church served as an election church (Norwegian: valgkirke). Together with more than 300 other parish churches across Norway, it was a polling station for elections to the 1814 Norwegian Constituent Assembly which wrote the Constitution of Norway. This was Norway's first national election. Each church parish was a constituency that elected people called "electors" who later met together in each county to elect the representatives for the assembly that was to meet at Eidsvoll Manor later that year.

== Media gallery ==
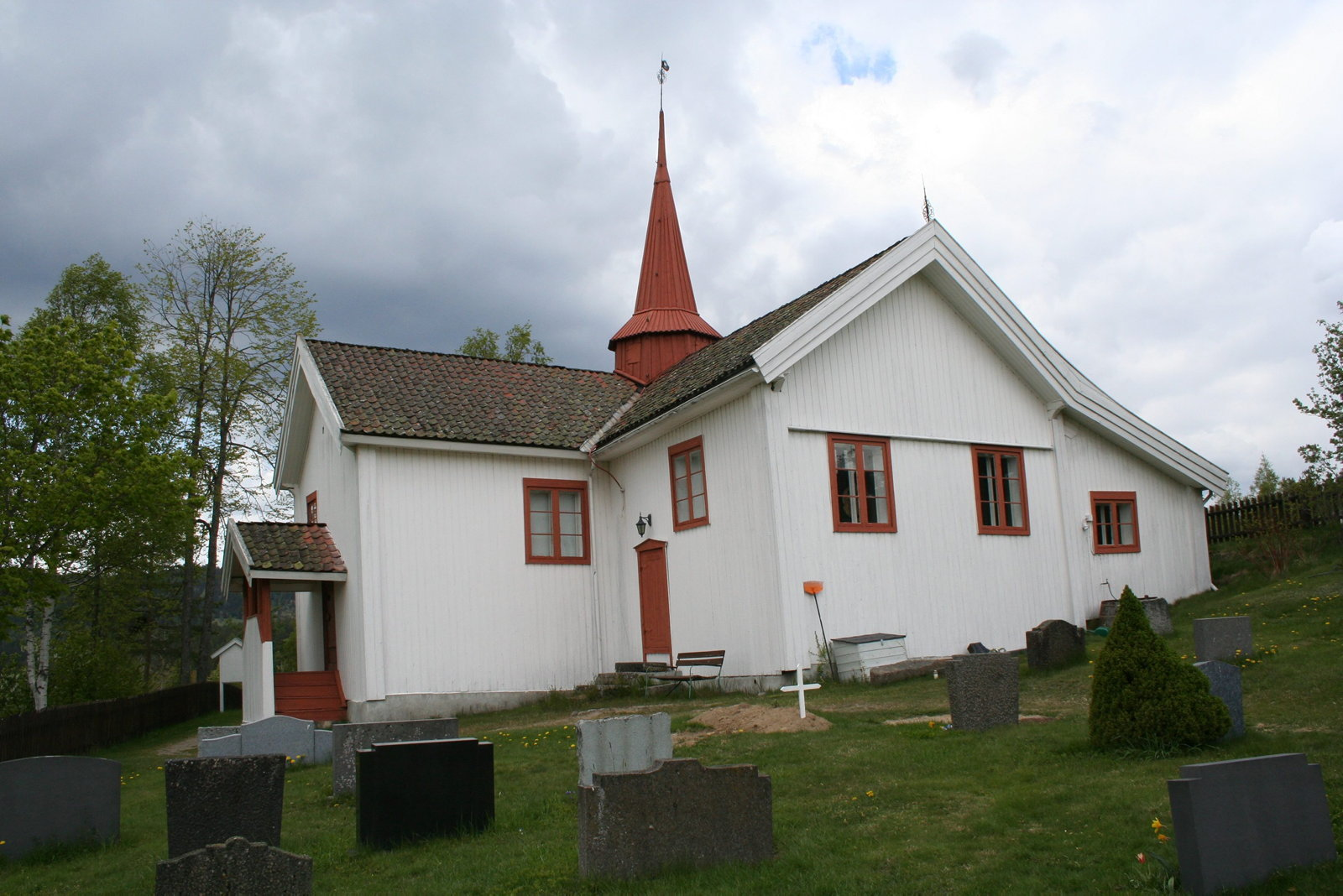

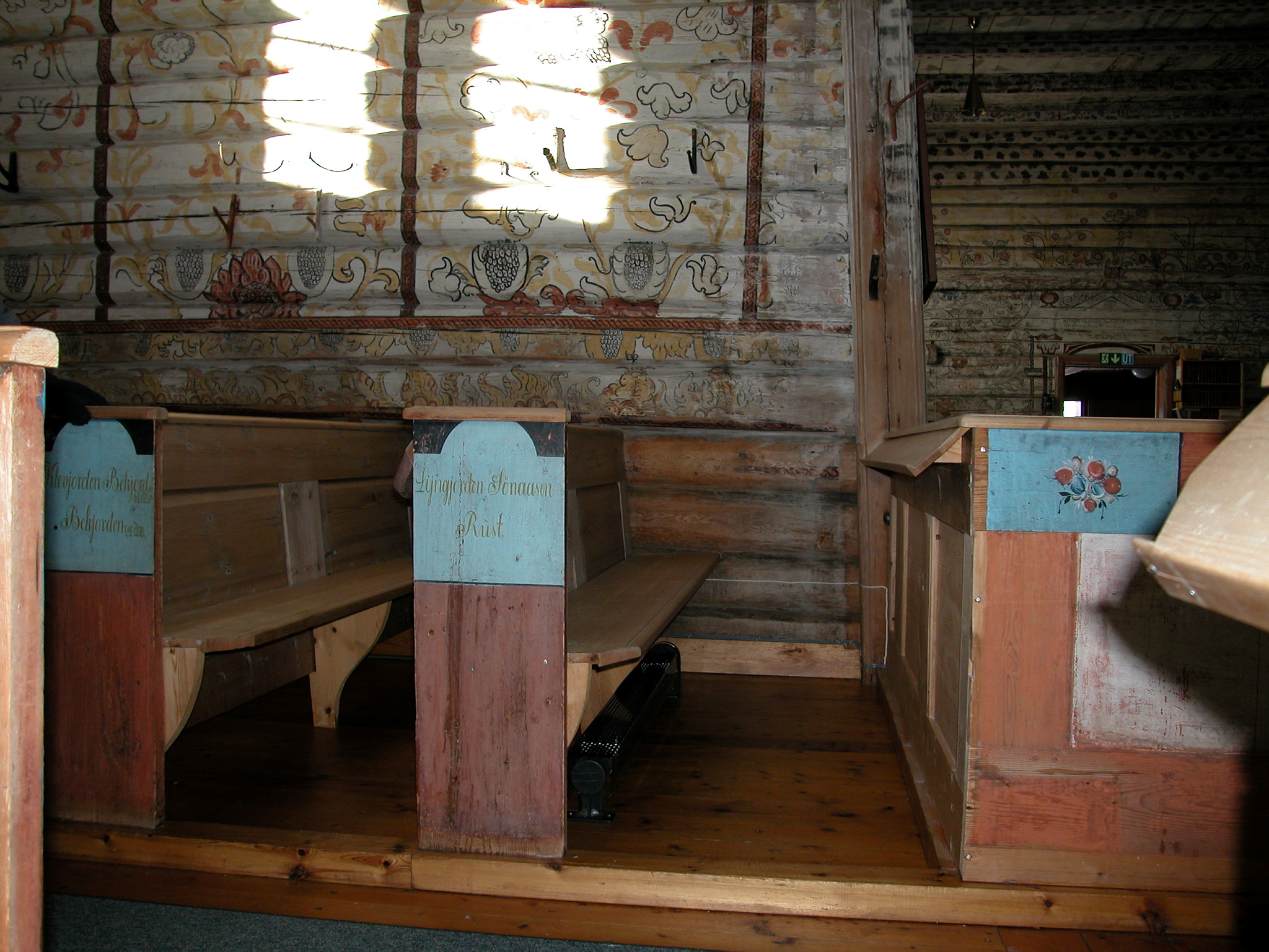

== See also ==
- List of churches in Tunsberg
