= Fagerfjell =

Mountain in Norway

Coordinates: 69°16′N 17°20′E

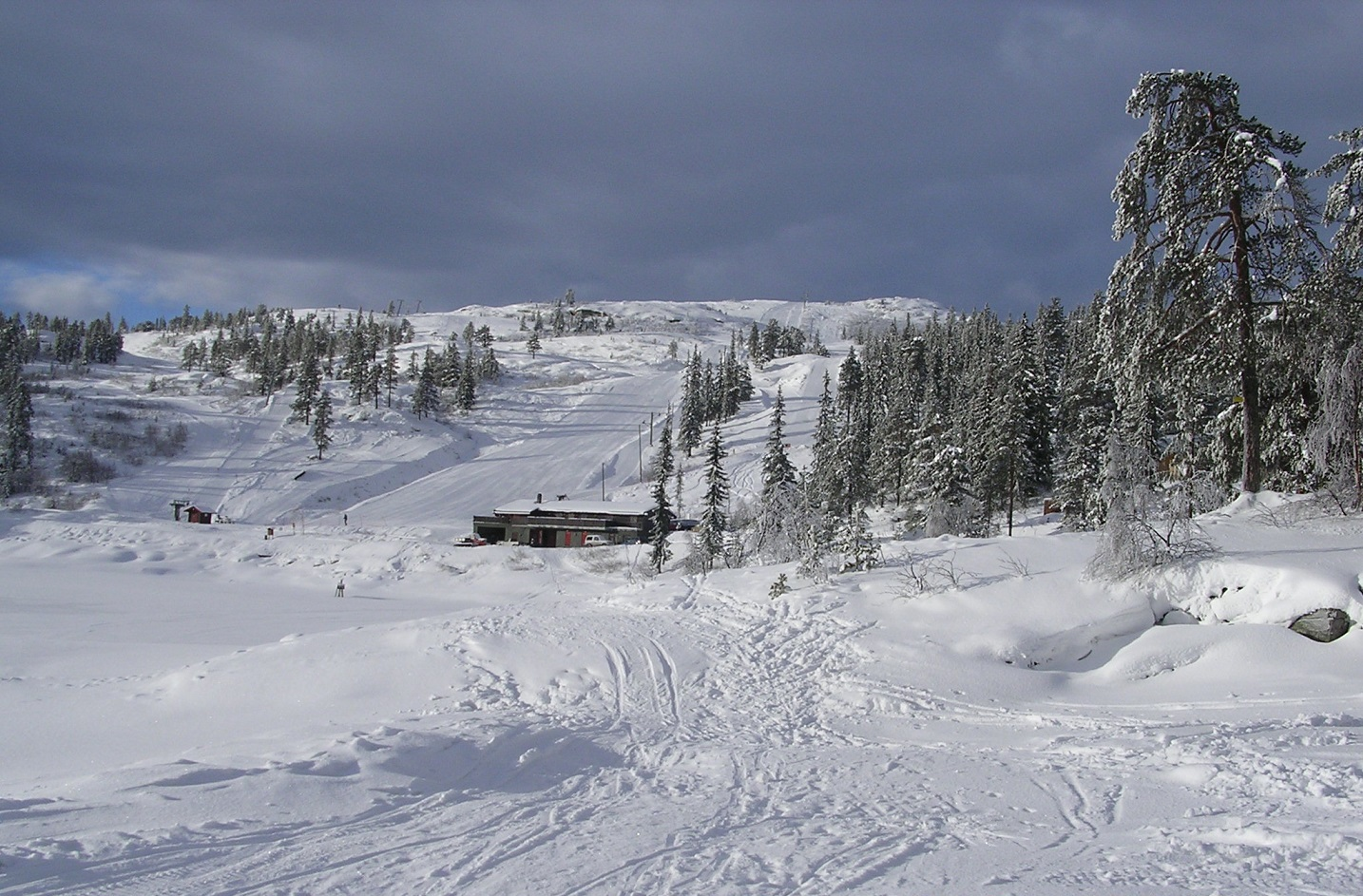
- Fagerfjell Alpine Center

Geography
- Location: Buskerud, Norway

Fagerfjell is a mountain in the municipality of Flesberg in Buskerud, Norway.
