= Lampeland =

Village in Flesberg Municipality, Norway

Coordinates: 59°50′0″N 9°34′0″E

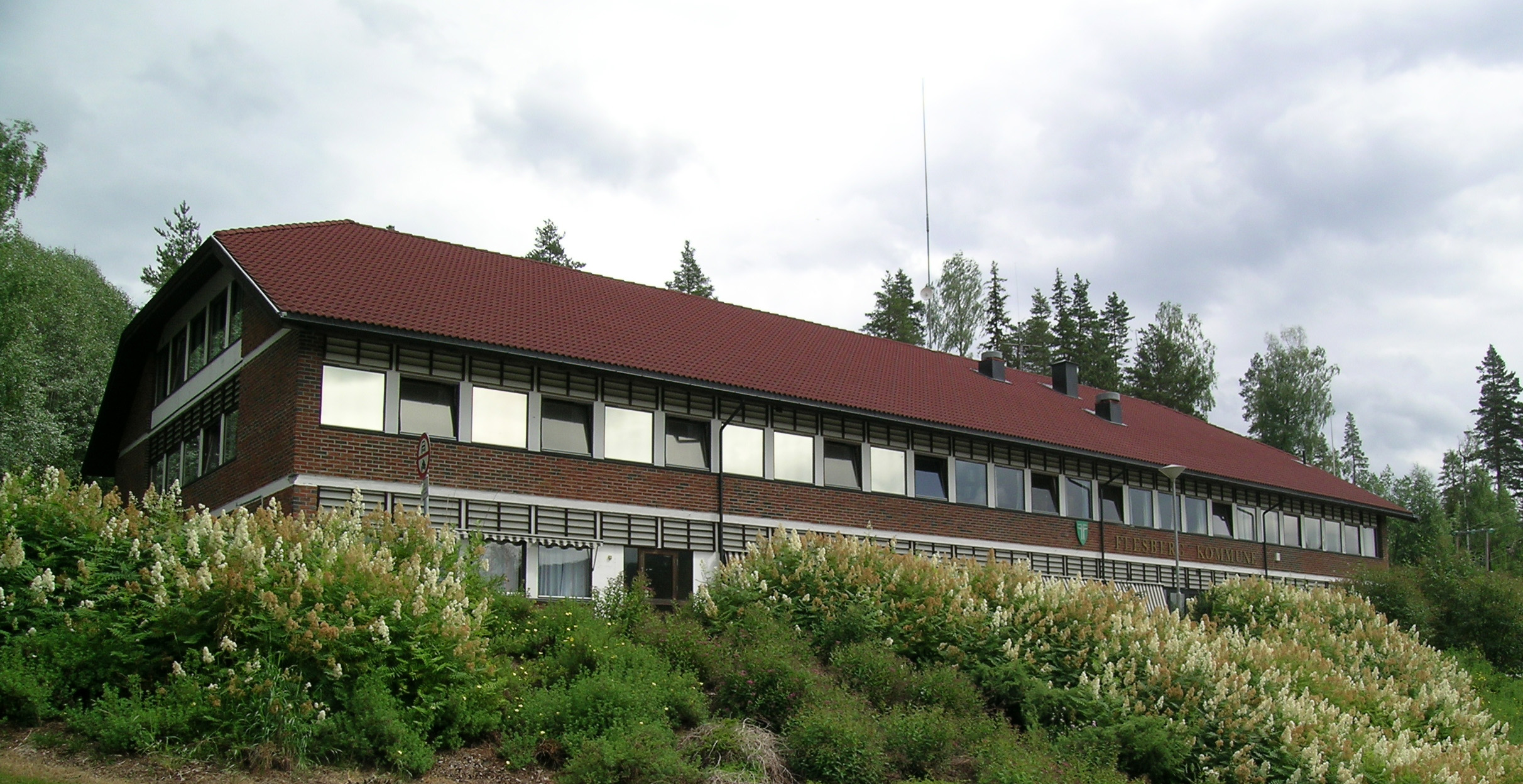
Flesberg Council offices in Lampeland

Lampeland is a town located in Buskerud, Norway. It is the administrative centre of Flesberg Municipality. The population of the village as of 2013 was 521 residents.

Lampeland is situated in the traditional region of Numedal. It is located on the east side of the Numedalslågen River. It is about 22 km north of Kongsberg, 60 km from Drammen and 100 km from Oslo. The village can be reached on Norwegian County road (Fylkesvei 40) which runs between Geilo and Larvik. Lampeland Hotell was established in the village during 1948. The hotel includes a restaurant, conference center and meeting rooms.
