= Svene =

Village in Flesberg Municipality, Norway

Coordinates: 59°48′N 9°35′E

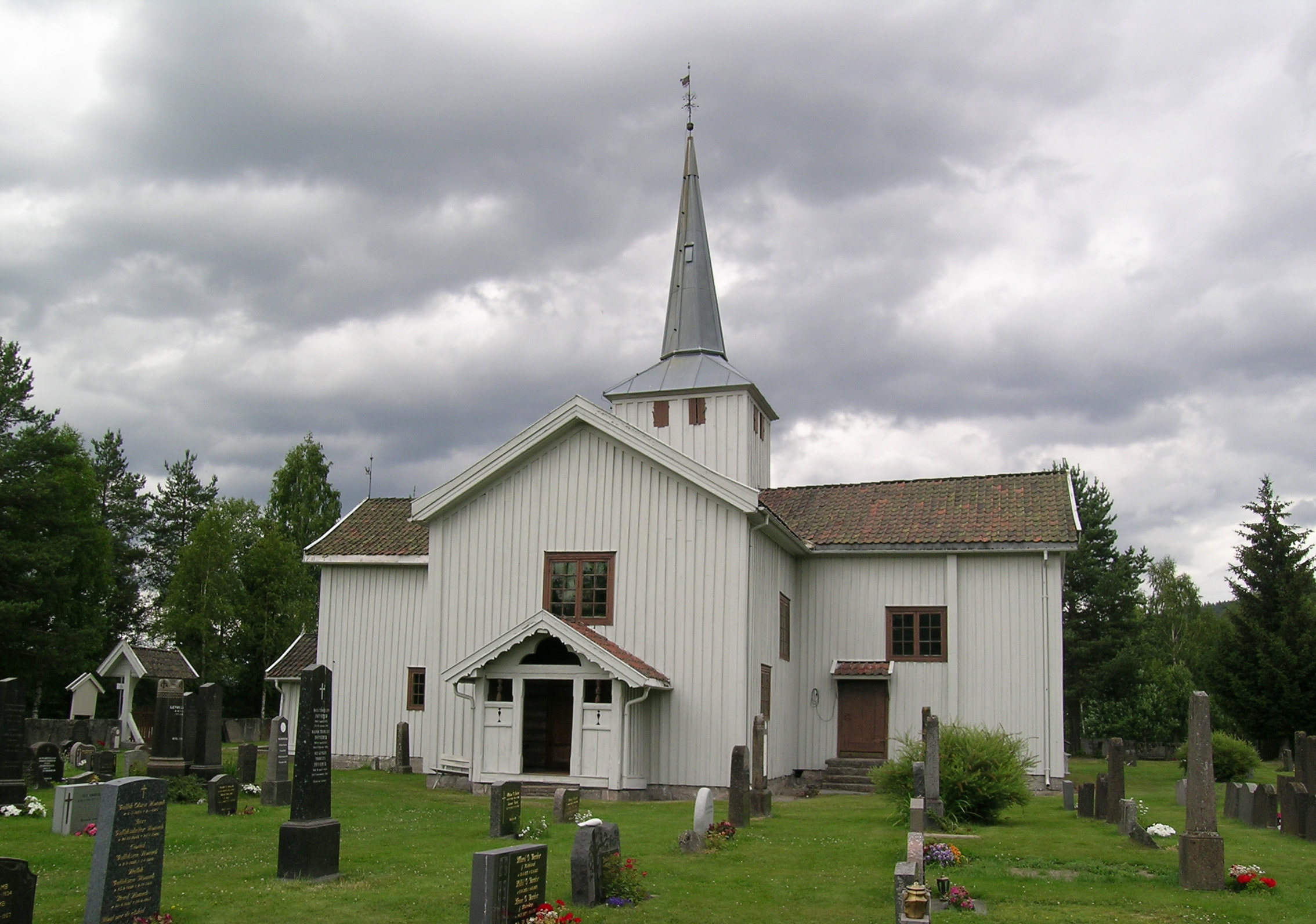
Svene Church

Svene is a village in the municipality of Flesberg in Buskerud, Norway. It is located in Numedal, 10 kilometres from Kongsberg. Its population (2017) is 376.

Former ski jumper Per Bergerud hails from Svene, he competed for the local sports team Svene IL. Svene Church was constructed of wood and built in 1738.
