= Numedal =

- District
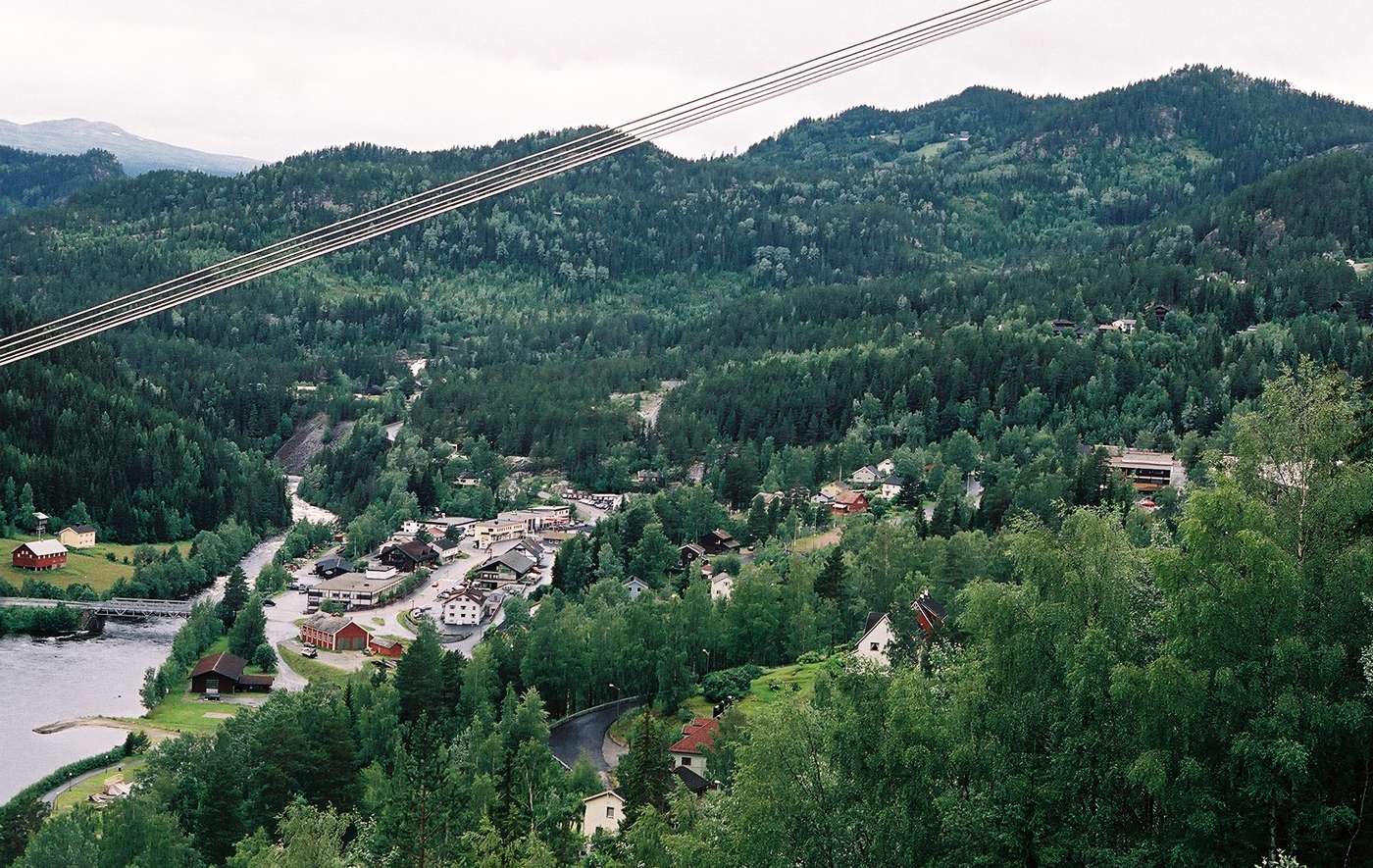
- Rødberg, the largest settlement in Numedal.

- Map of Numedal with municipalities
- Coordinates: 60°N 9.2°E
- Country: Norway
- County: Buskerud
- Region: Austlandet
- Urban centres: Rødberg (and Kongsberg)

Area
  - Total: 3,513.35 km^{2} (1,356.51 sq mi)

Population (2026)
  - Total: 6,701
  - Density: 1.907/km^{2} (4.940/sq mi)
- Demonym: Numedøl

Numedal (Norwegian: [ˈnʉ̀ːmədɑːɫ]) is a valley and a traditional district in Eastern Norway located within the county of Buskerud. It traditionally includes Flesberg Municipality, Nore og Uvdal Municipality and Rollag Municipality (in modern times, Kongsberg Municipality is also often included in the district).

== Geography ==
Numedal is the southernmost valley of the major valleys in Eastern Norway. Numedal is largely a U-shaped valley. Most of the area is mountainous, especially west of the main valley, with steep valley sides. Running north–south, it extends between Flesberg in the south to Rødberg in the north, passing through Flesberg Municipality, Rollag Municipality, and Nore og Uvdal Municipality. The Numedalslågen, the third-longest river in Norway, flows through the valley before discharging into Oslofjord at Larvik.

== Transportation ==
National Road 40 runs from Larvik. National Road 7 crosses Hardangervidda to Geilo. Numedal Line Railway (Numedalsbanen) was opened in 1927 and stopped operations in 1988. The former railroad track from Veggli to Rødberg is now used principally for cycling. The railway tracks from Rollag to Veggli, are being refurbished (as of Q2 2026); the tracks are expected to be used for draisines, when work is completed.

== Economy ==
Agriculture and forestry are important industries in the valley along with hydropower generation, as well as growing tourist traffic.

== Etymology ==
The name comes from Nauma, the Old Norse name for the Numedalslågen, and dal meaning "valley". The origin and meaning of the name are the same as that of Namdalen.

== Attractions ==
The area along the Numedalslågen from Flesberg Municipality up to the Hardangervidda through the valley has a large number of examples of Medieval Scandinavian architecture. There are still over 40 historic timber buildings and four stave churches: Flesberg Stave Church, Rollag Stave Church, Nore Stave Church and Uvdal Stave Church.

Numedal was also the location of one of the "Nordmann's trails" (Nordmannsslepene), which were the old main roads between east and west over Hardangervidda. On the marked paths, remains of Stone Age dwelling places, bog iron works and grave mounds can be seen.

Numedal also has several museums including Nore og Uvdal Open Air Museum (Nore og Uvdal Bygdetun) in Uvdal, Rollag Open Air Museum (Rollag Bygdetun) in Rollag, and Dåset Open Air Museum (Dåset bygdetun) at Flesberg. These are collections of historic buildings, mostly built in the traditional style common for the valley.

== Gallery ==
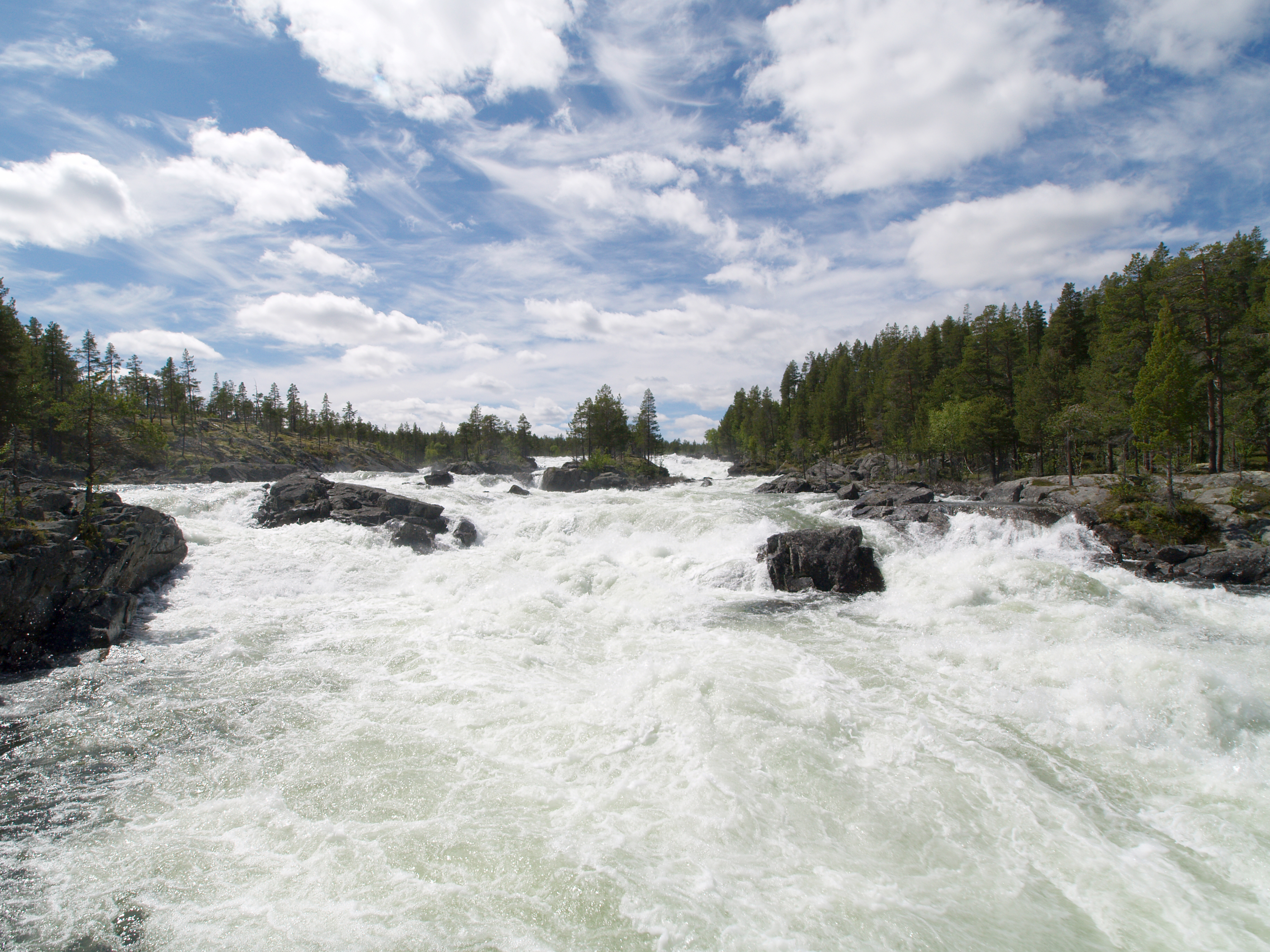
Godfarfossen on Numedalslågen

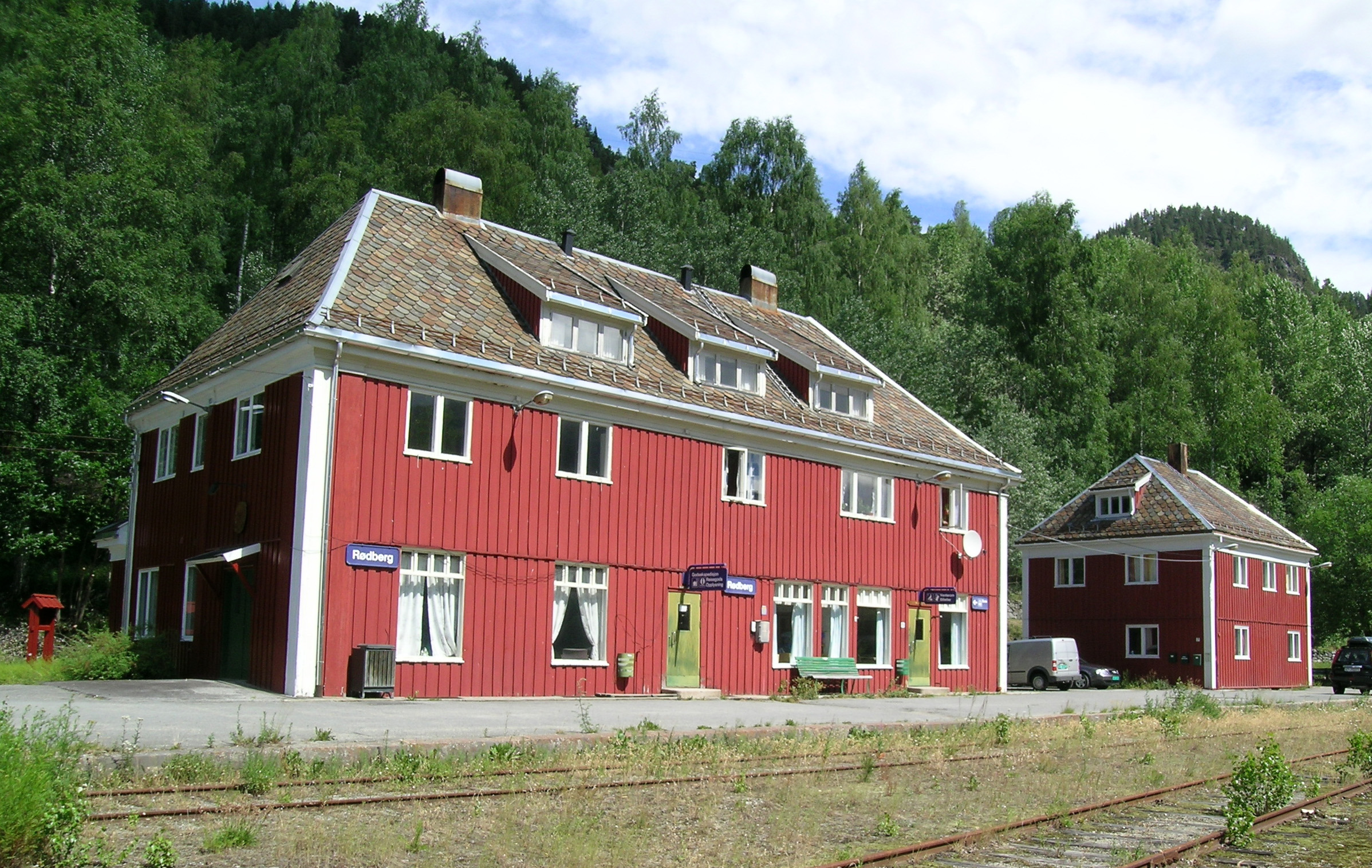
Rødberg Station on the partially closed Numedal Rail Line

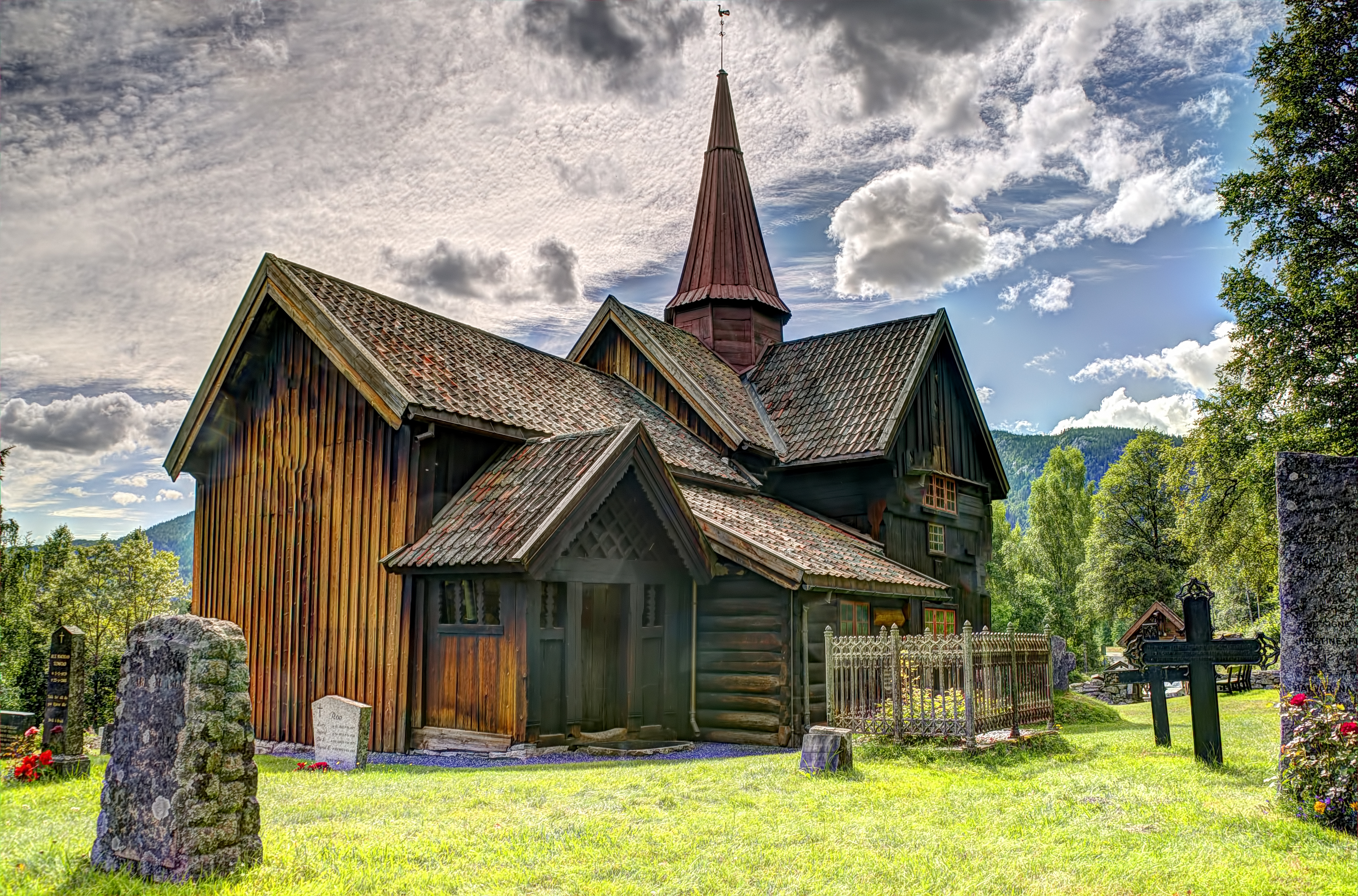
Rollag Stave Church

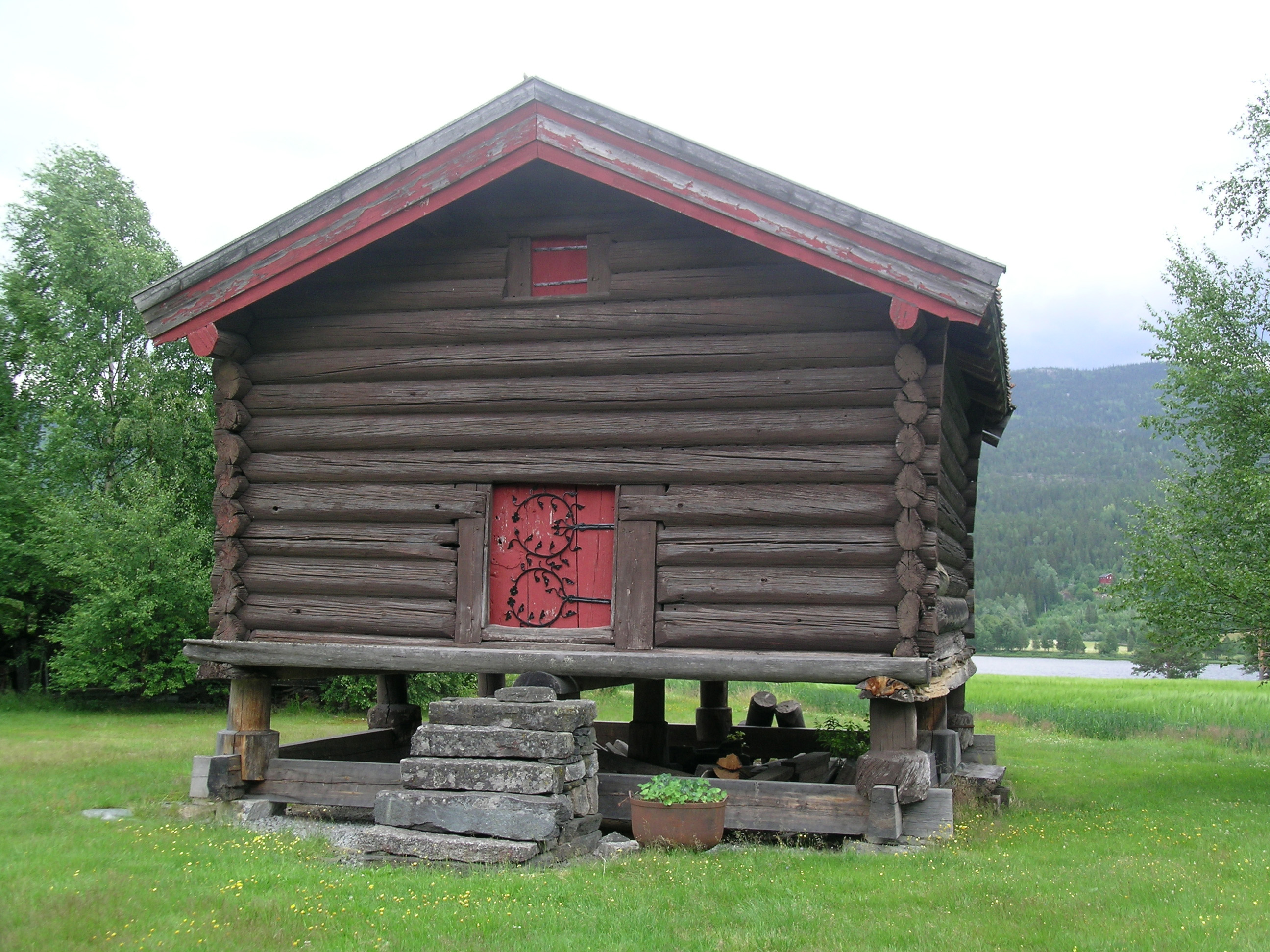
Alfstadloftet

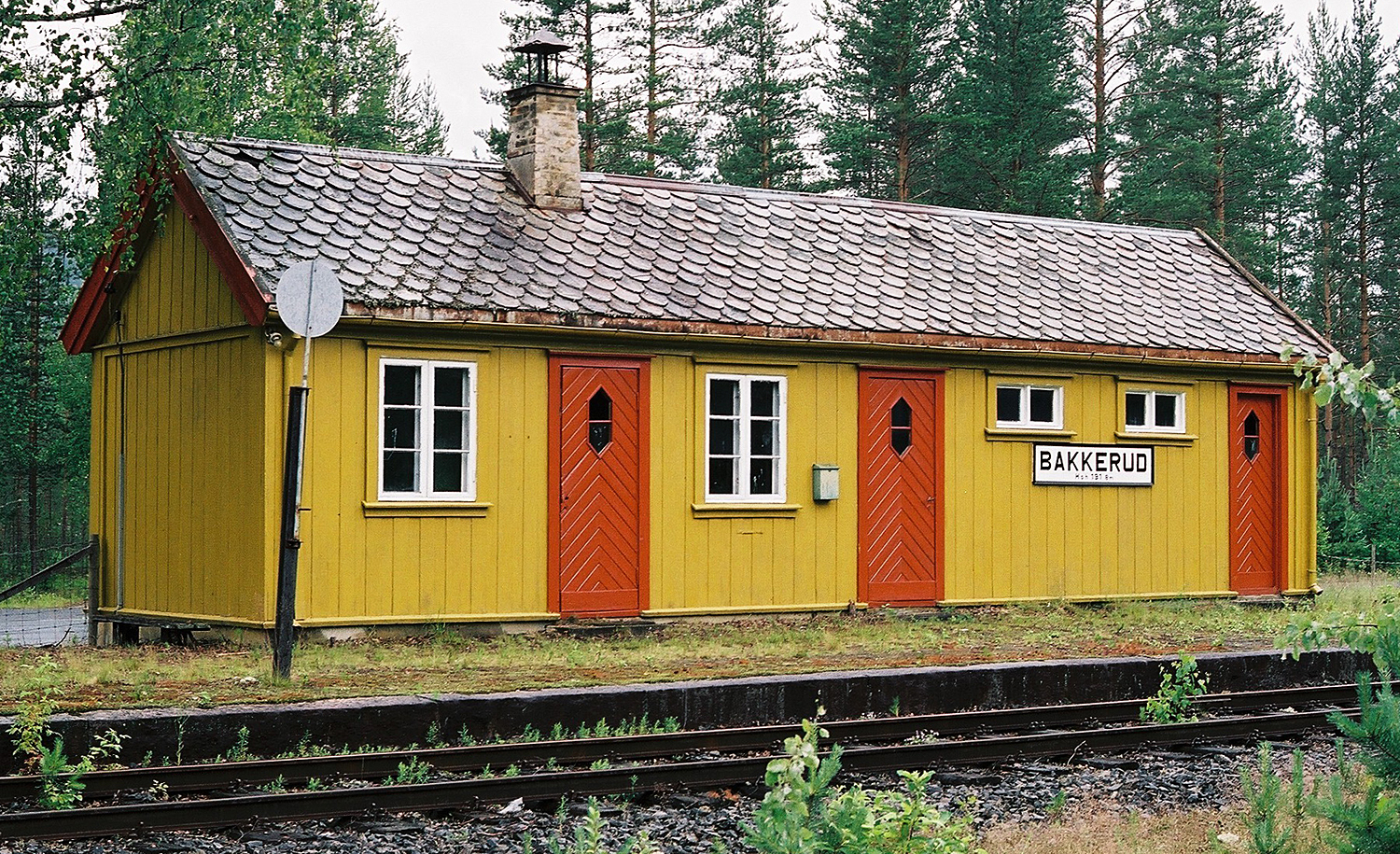
Bakkerud Station

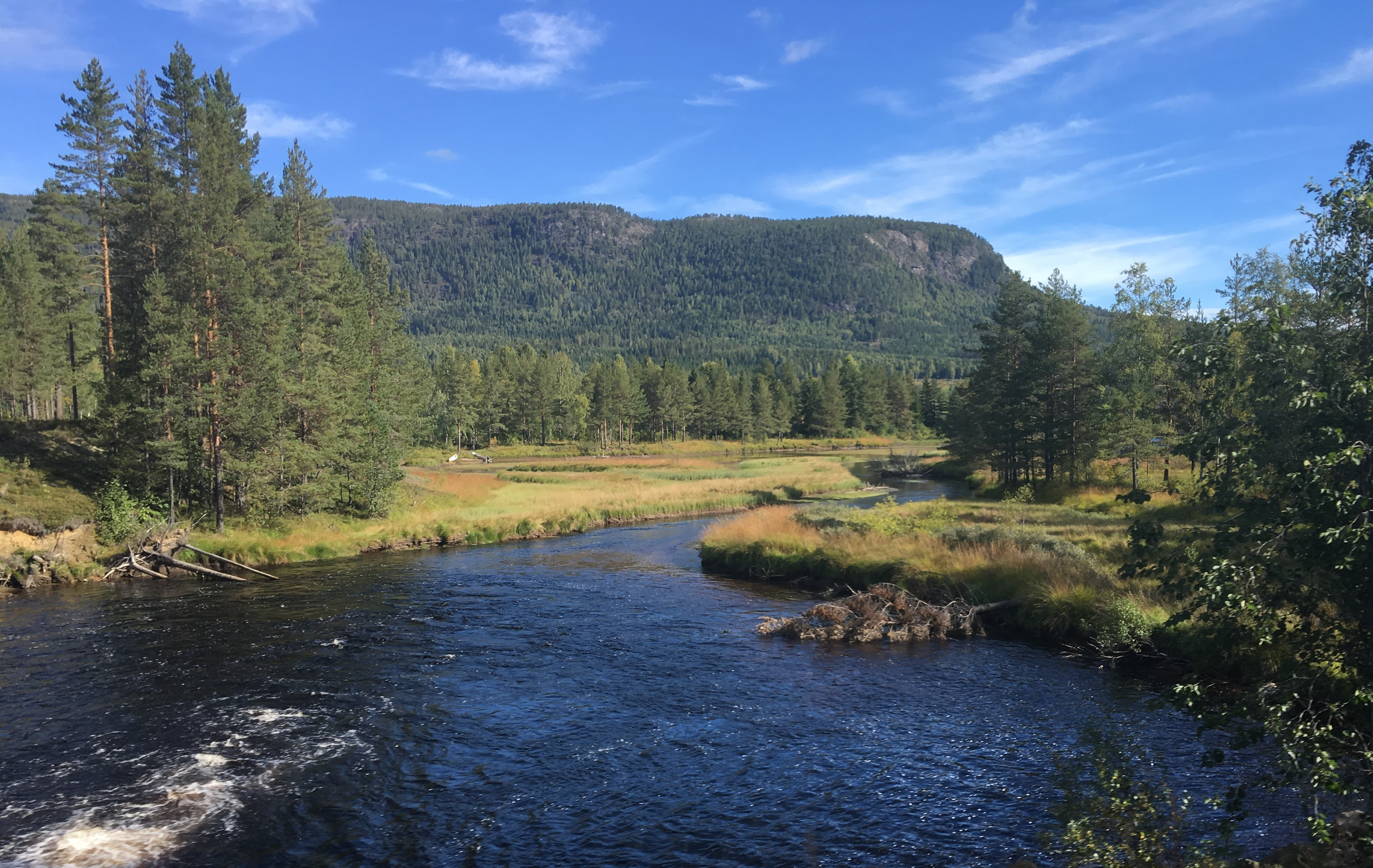
Vrengja at Lågen

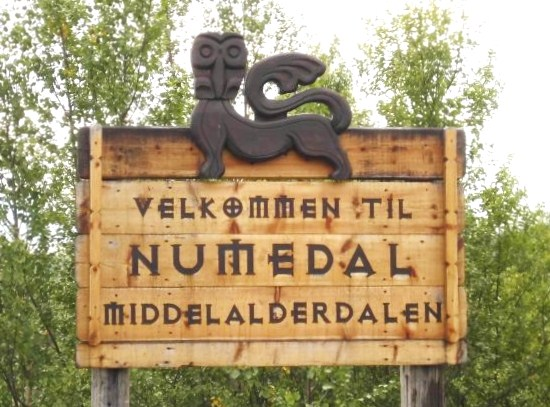
A welcome sign to Numedal

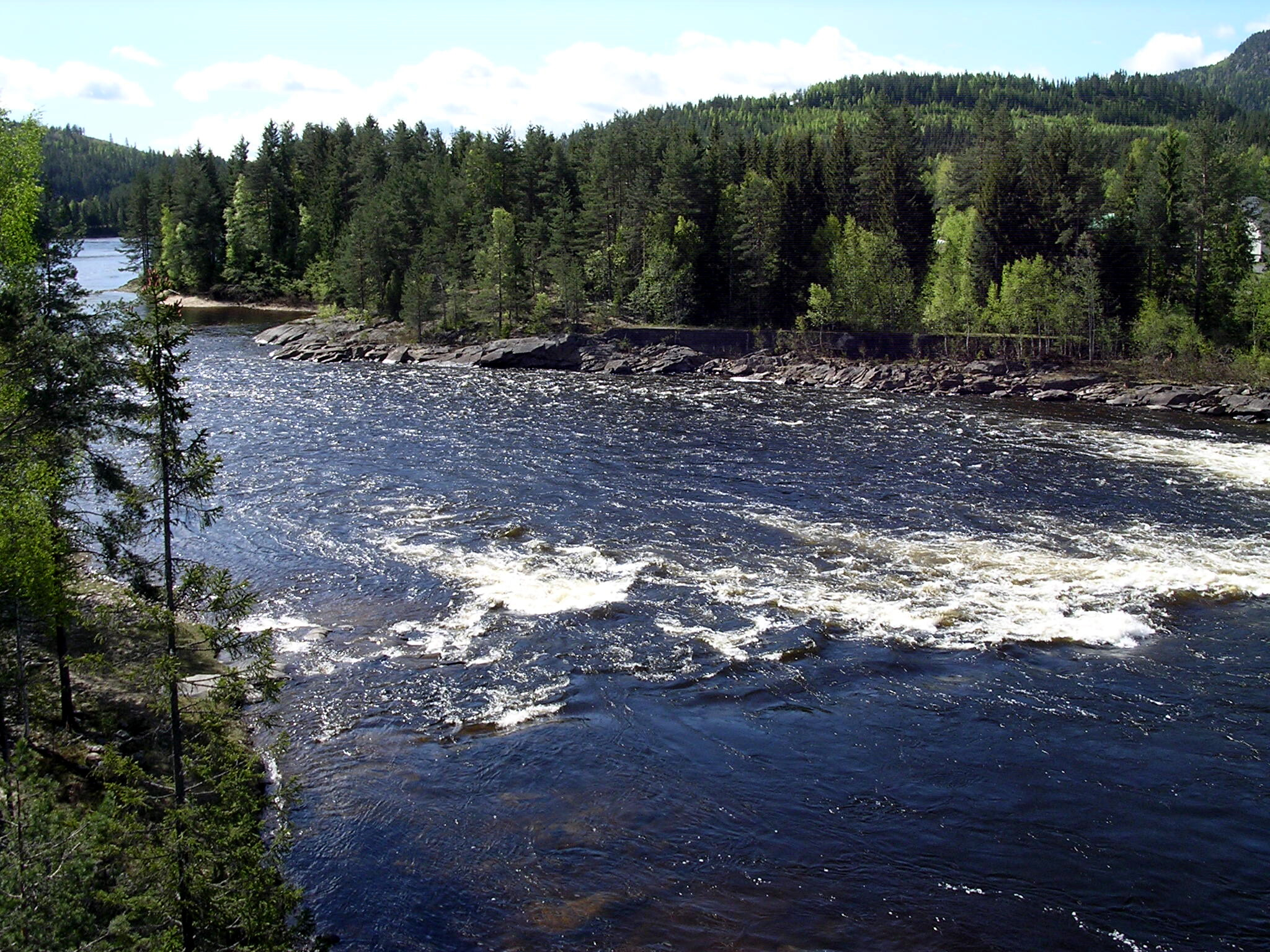
Numedalslågen in Numedal

== Climate ==
Numedal has a subarctic climate (Dfc) with short, mild, and wet summers with cool nights and long, cold, and snowy winters.

Climate data for Lyngdal in Numedal 1961–1990, extremes 1959–2015
Month	Jan	Feb	Mar	Apr	May	Jun	Jul	Aug	Sep	Oct	Nov	Dec	Year
Record high °C (°F)	11.5 (52.7)	12.5 (54.5)	16.6 (61.9)	24.2 (75.6)	28.3 (82.9)	32.6 (90.7)	31.3 (88.3)	32.2 (90.0)	25.0 (77.0)	24.0 (75.2)	15.1 (59.2)	13.4 (56.1)	32.6 (90.7)
Mean daily maximum °C (°F)	−3.6 (25.5)	−1.2 (29.8)	3.3 (37.9)	8.2 (46.8)	14.7 (58.5)	19.5 (67.1)	20.5 (68.9)	19.1 (66.4)	14.0 (57.2)	8.8 (47.8)	1.5 (34.7)	−2.3 (27.9)	8.5 (47.4)
Mean daily minimum °C (°F)	−11.1 (12.0)	−10.5 (13.1)	−6.5 (20.3)	−2.3 (27.9)	2.9 (37.2)	7.2 (45.0)	8.9 (48.0)	7.8 (46.0)	4.3 (39.7)	0.8 (33.4)	−5.2 (22.6)	−9.8 (14.4)	−1.1 (30.0)
Record low °C (°F)	−34.2 (−29.6)	−31.0 (−23.8)	−27.3 (−17.1)	−15.2 (4.6)	−7.2 (19.0)	−2.1 (28.2)	0.5 (32.9)	−0.5 (31.1)	−5.6 (21.9)	−15.4 (4.3)	−23.0 (−9.4)	−29.2 (−20.6)	−34.2 (−29.6)
Average precipitation mm (inches)	52 (2.0)	37 (1.5)	43 (1.7)	41 (1.6)	62 (2.4)	72 (2.8)	86 (3.4)	90 (3.5)	87 (3.4)	97 (3.8)	77 (3.0)	53 (2.1)	797 (31.2)
Average precipitation days	10.0	7.2	8.4	7.8	9.7	10.7	11.5	11.2	10.6	10.9	10.7	9.5	118.2
Source: Met Norway Eklima
