= Flesberg Stave Church =

Church in Buskerud, Norway

- Flesberg stavkirke
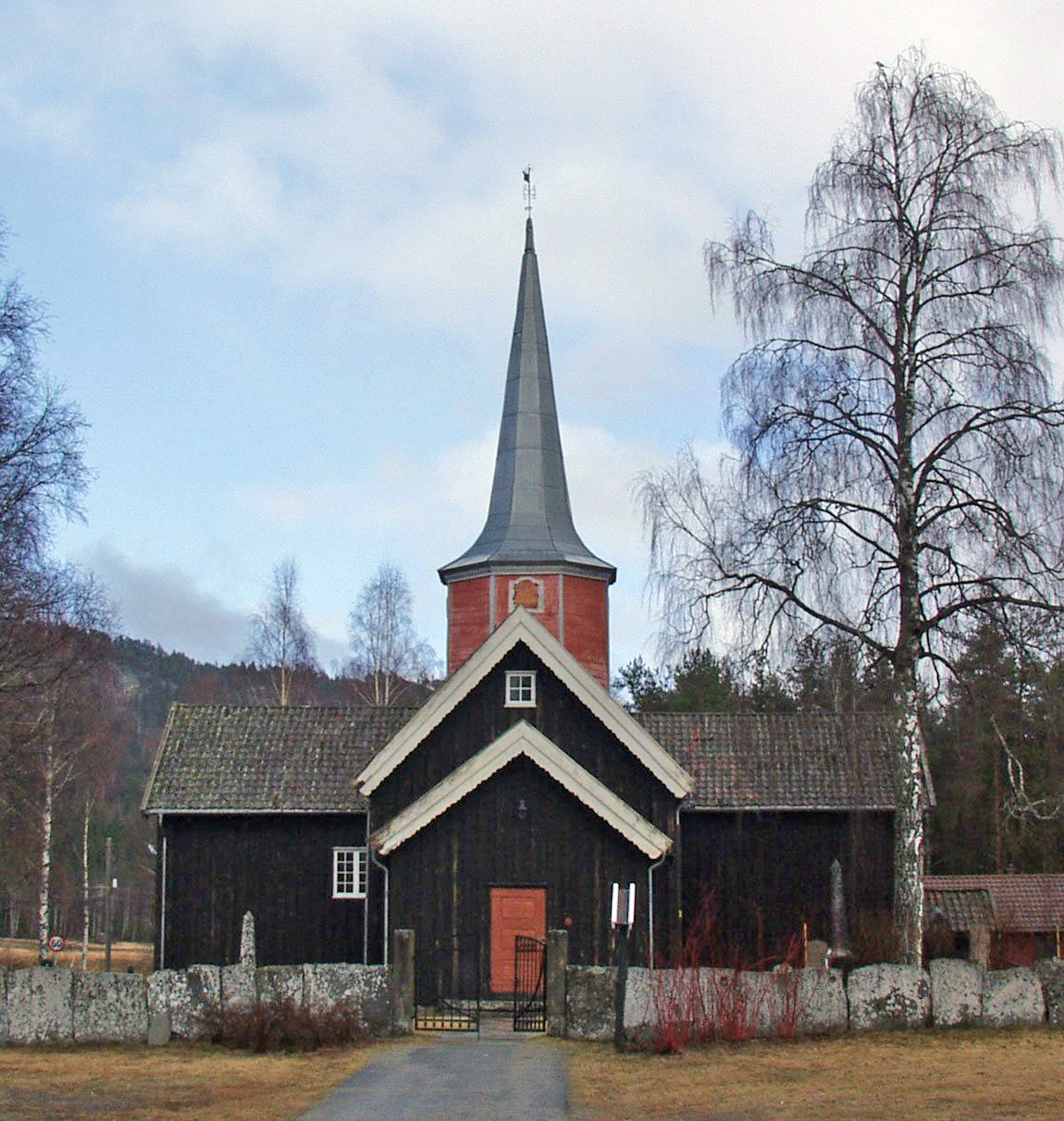
- View of the church
- Flesberg Stave Church
- 59°51′46″N 9°25′59″E
- Location: Flesberg Municipality, Buskerud
- Country: Norway
- Denomination: Church of Norway
- Previous denomination: Catholic Church
- Churchmanship: Evangelical Lutheran

History
- Status: Parish church
- Founded: 12th century
- Consecrated: 12th century

Architecture
- Functional status: Active
- Architectural type: Stave church
- Completed: c. 1150 (876 years ago)

Specifications
- Capacity: 250
- Materials: Wood

Administration
- Diocese: Tunsberg
- Deanery: Kongsberg prosti
- Parish: Flesberg
- Norwegian Cultural Heritage Site
- Type: Church
- Status: Automatically protected
- ID: 84161

Flesberg Stave Church (Norwegian: Flesberg stavkirke) is a parish church of the Church of Norway in Flesberg Municipality in Buskerud county, Norway. It is located in the village of Flesberg. It is the church for the Flesberg parish which is part of the Kongsberg prosti (deanery) in the Diocese of Tunsberg. The brown, wooden church was built in a stave church design in the second half of the 12th century. The church seats about 250 people.

== History ==
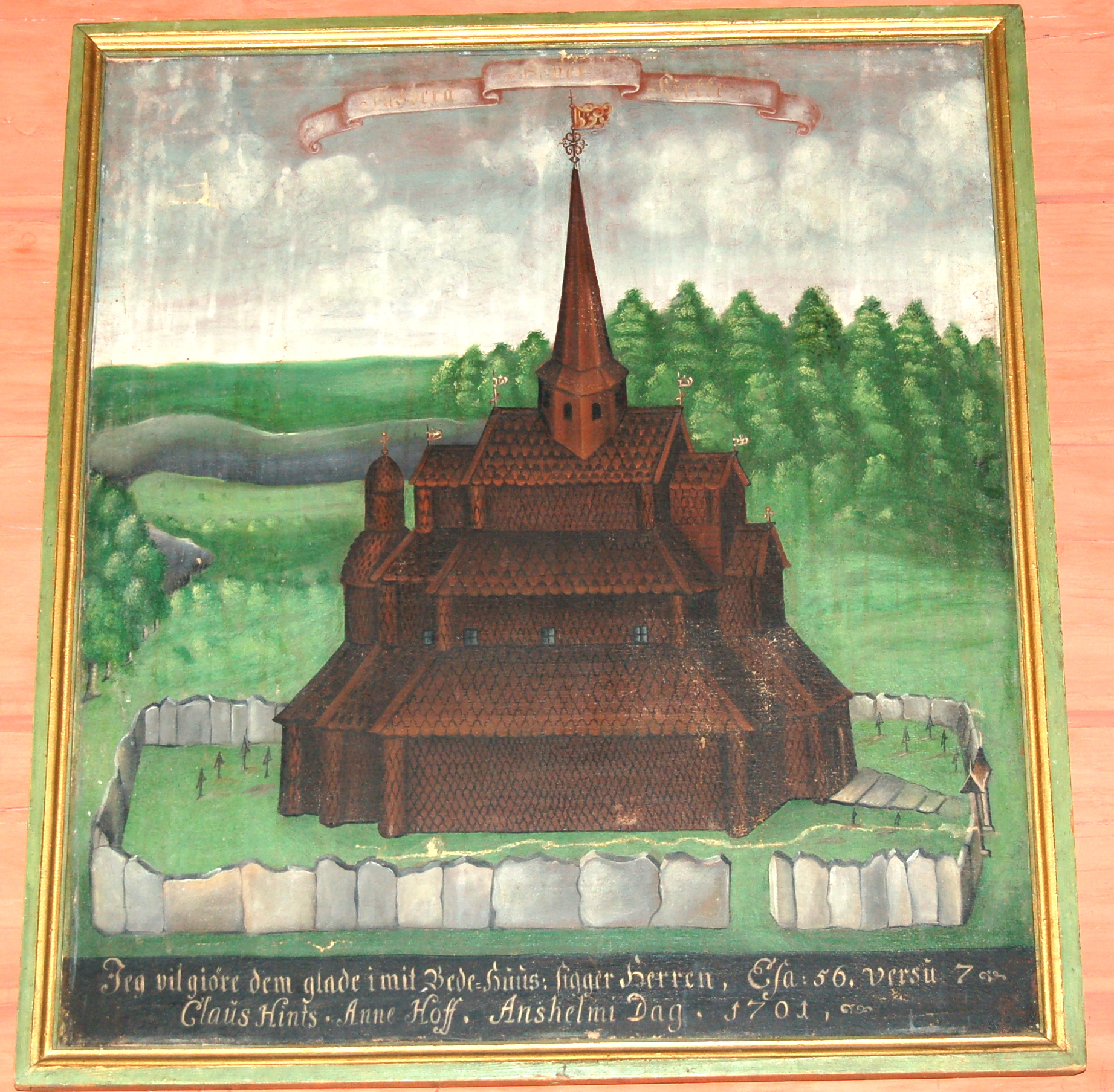
Church and stone fence (Niels Hansen Bragernes from 1701)

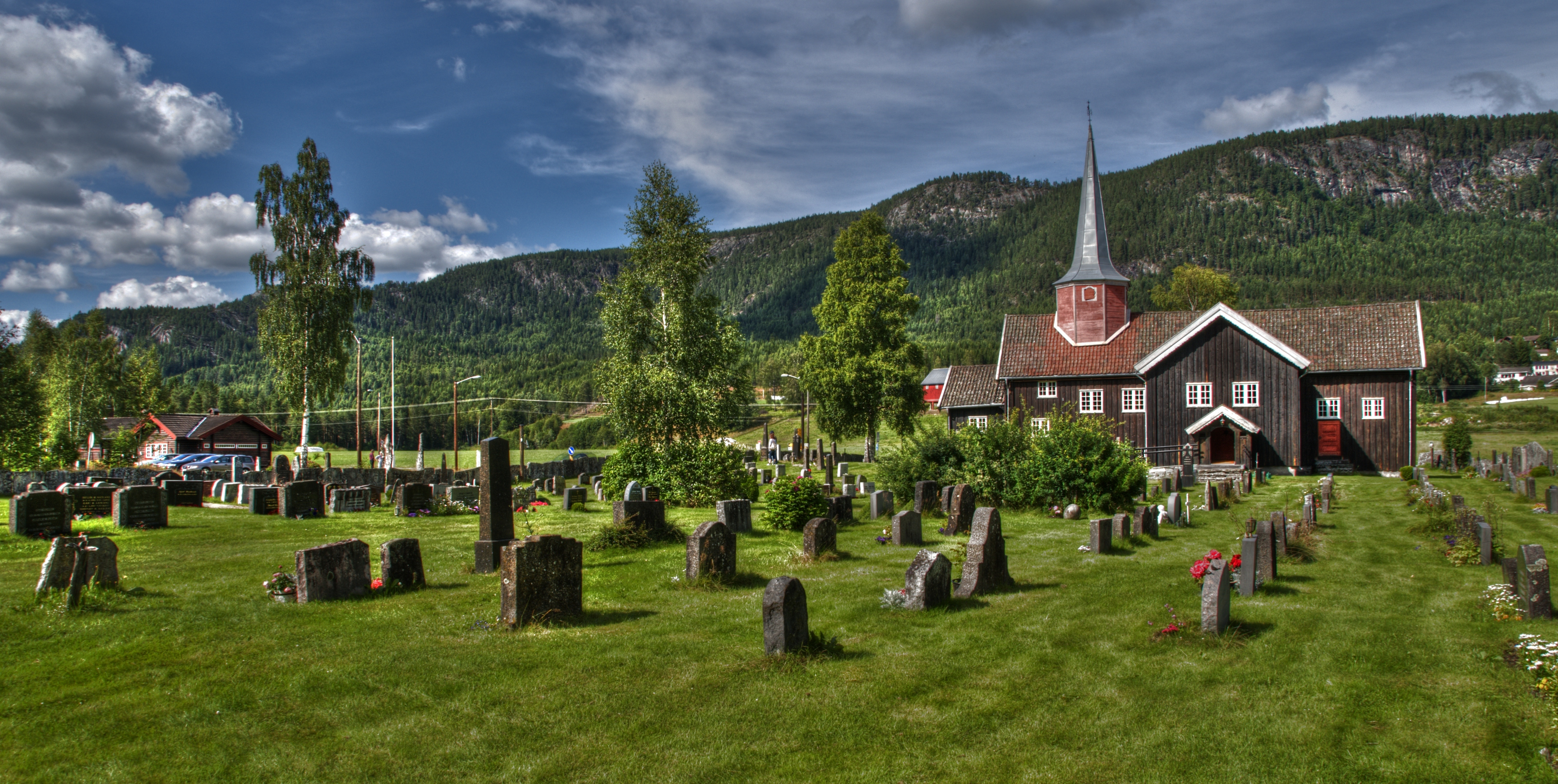
Graveyard

The earliest existing historical records of the church date back to the year 1359, but the church was not built that year. The wooden stave church was probably built between the years 1150 and 1200. The church was originally a single nave church (type B) with four free-standing internal posts bearing a raised central roof, surrounded by an ambulatory or aisles on all four sides. It had a narrower chancel, also with a raised central roof, and a semicircular apse. It was surrounded by a gallery loosely connected to the plank walls.

In 1735, the chancel and apse, as well as the east wall of the nave, were removed. The nave was extended eastwards and two transepts were added, making a cruciform plan. The additions were built in horizontal log construction with notched corners. Portal planks are decorated with carved vines and animal ornamentation. Since few parts of the stave church are preserved, there are only scant remnants of its original decor. Of the original stave church, only three outer walls survived, as the internal posts and the raised roof were eliminated.

The churchyard is fenced with slate brought from Haukeli farm on the west bank of the Lågen River. Some slates have iron rings affixed; these rings were used to tether horses during service. Each farmer had a designated ring for his horse (the oldest dated ring from 1661). The idiosyncratic stone fence is shown on a 1701 painting (the oldest existing painting of a stave church).

The interior of the church is characterized by the reconstruction of 1735. There are a few remains of medieval furnishings. There is a decorated lion and a lionhead that also originates in the Middle Ages. Underneath the whitewashed walls, decorative paintings from the Middle Ages were uncovered.

In 1814, this church served as an election church (Norwegian: valgkirke). Together with more than 300 other parish churches across Norway, it was a polling station for elections to the 1814 Norwegian Constituent Assembly which wrote the Constitution of Norway. This was Norway's first national election. Each church parish was a constituency that elected people called "electors" who later met together in each county to elect the representatives for the assembly that was to meet at Eidsvoll Manor later that year.

== Media gallery ==
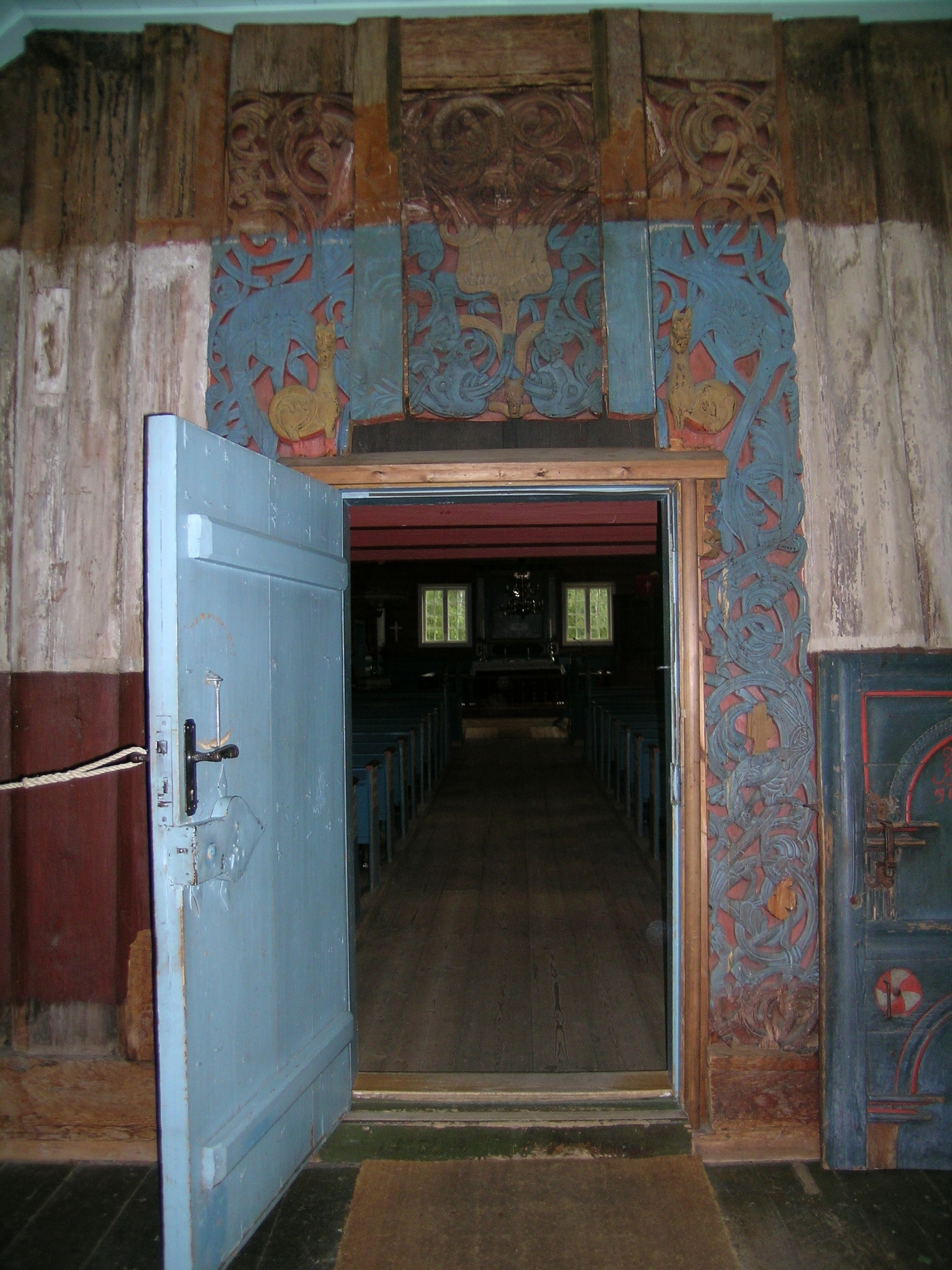
Portal

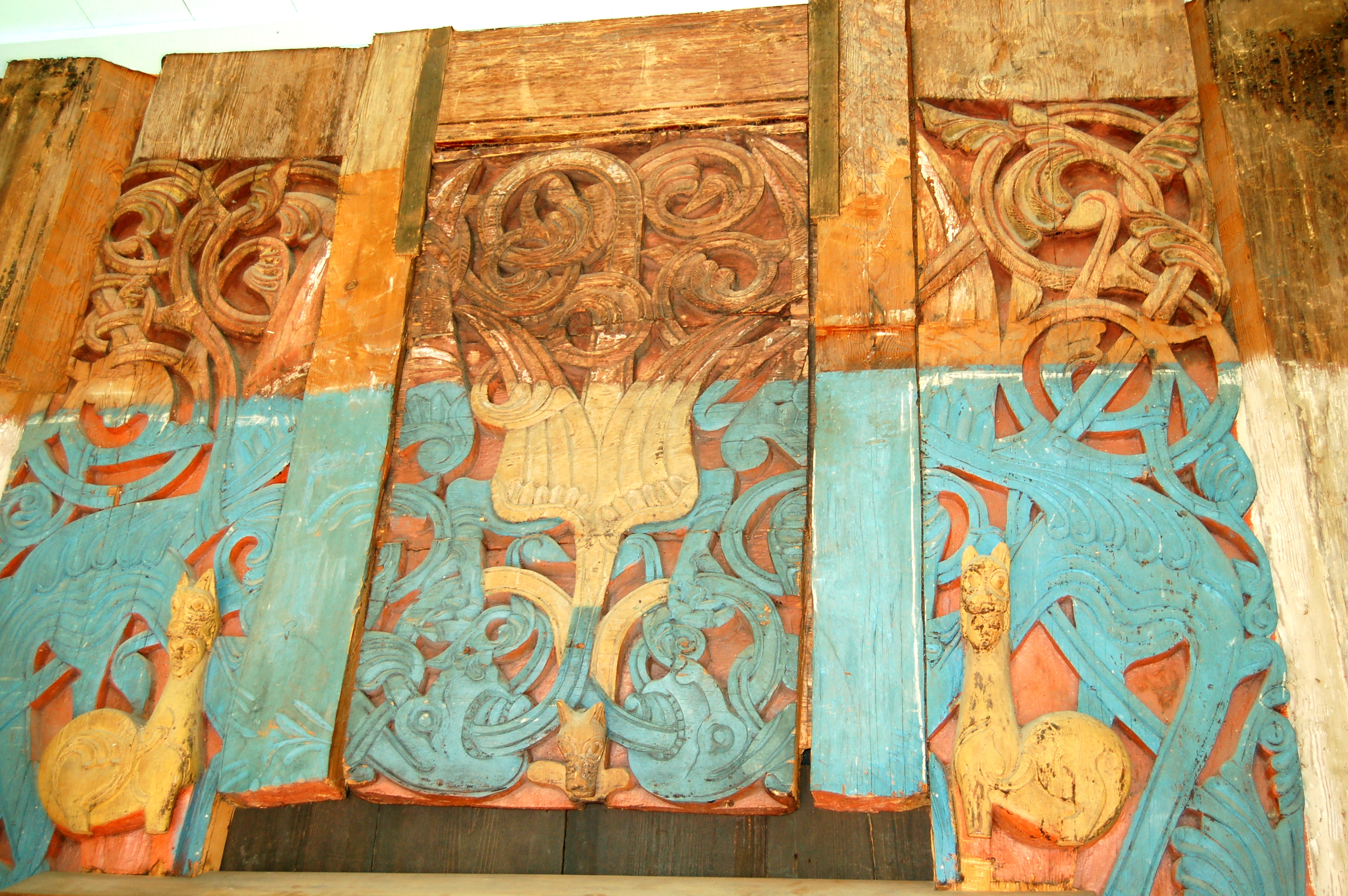
Portal detail

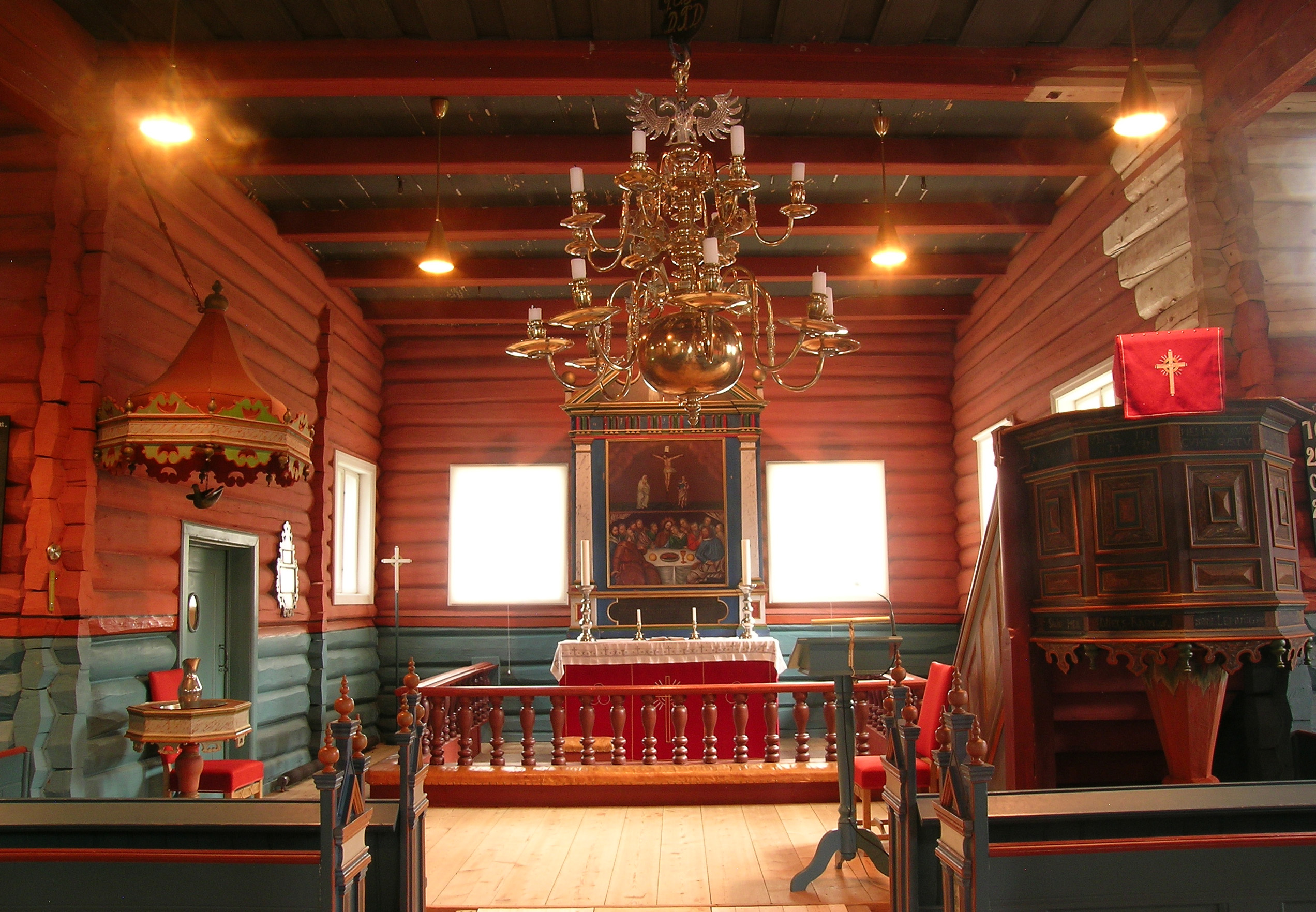
Choir and pulpit

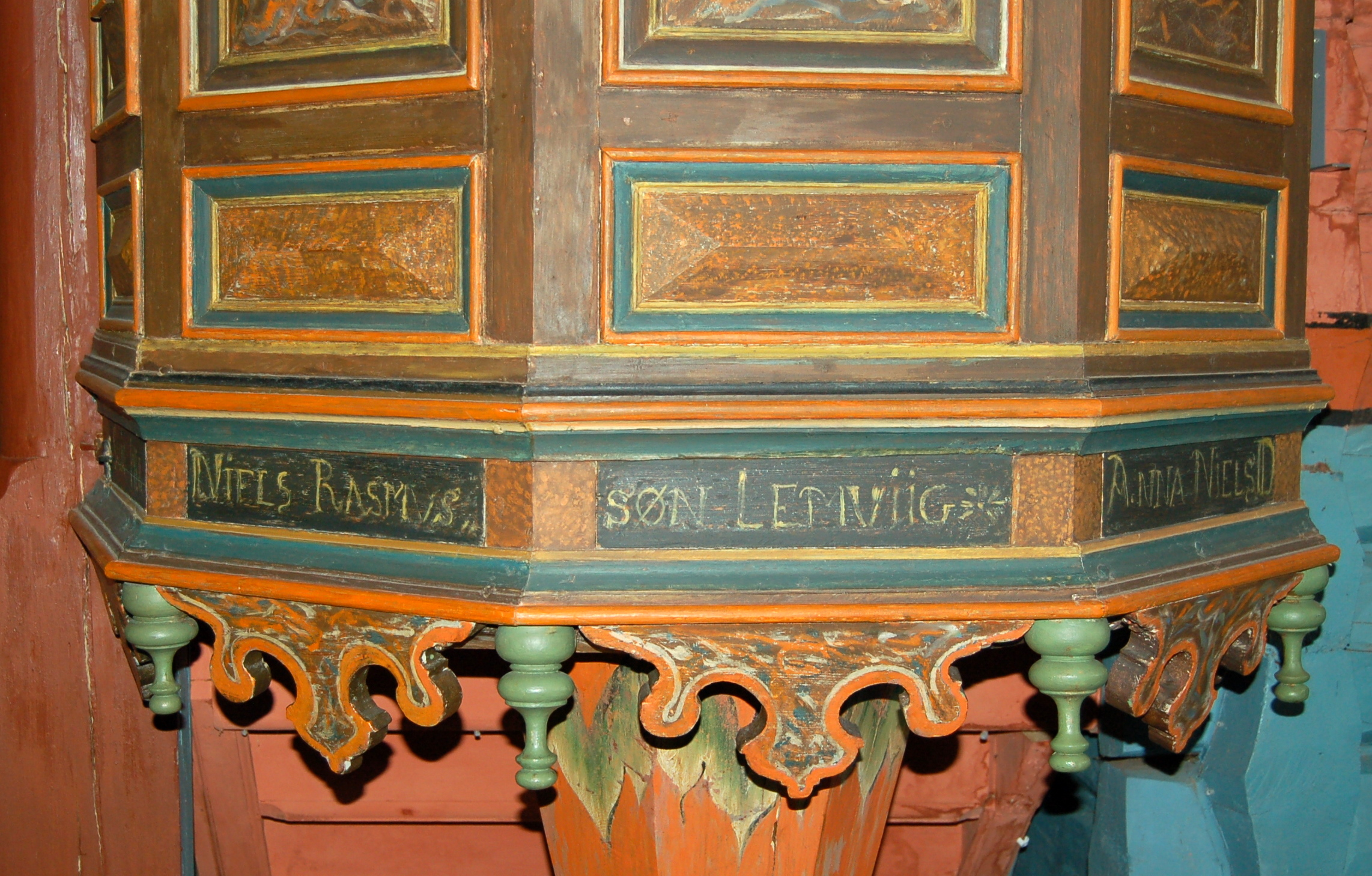
Pulpit detail

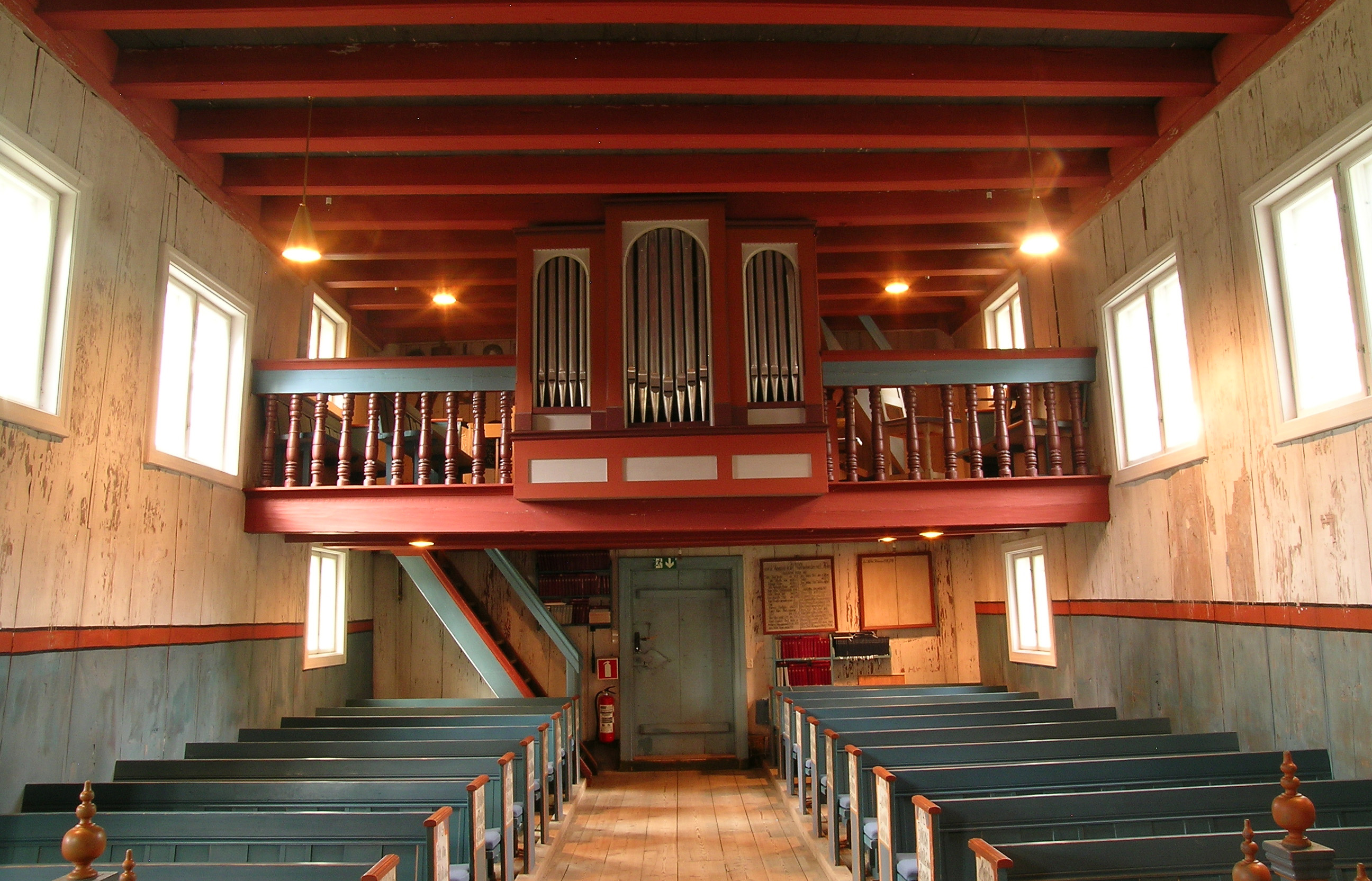
Nave and organ

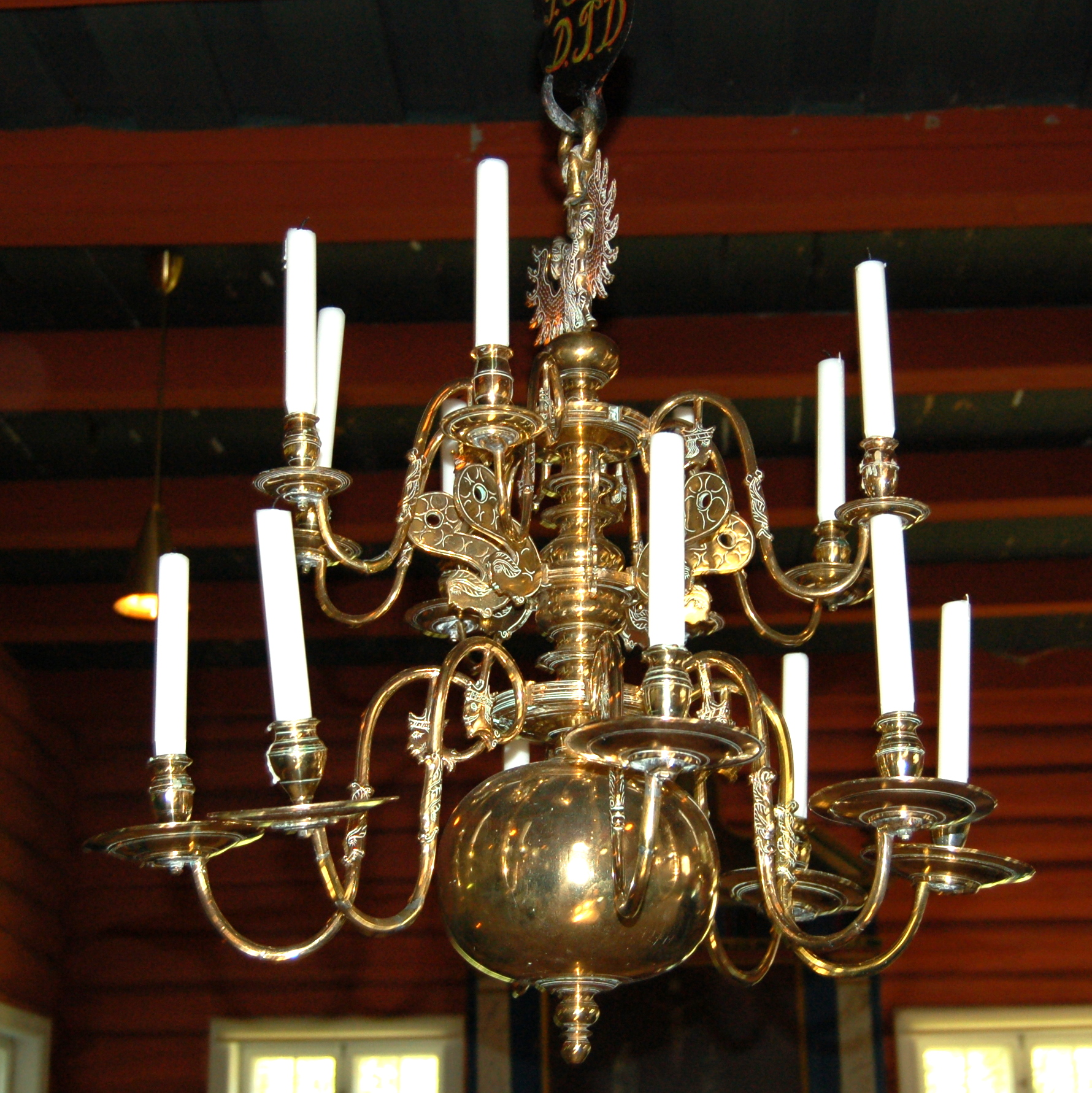
Chandelier

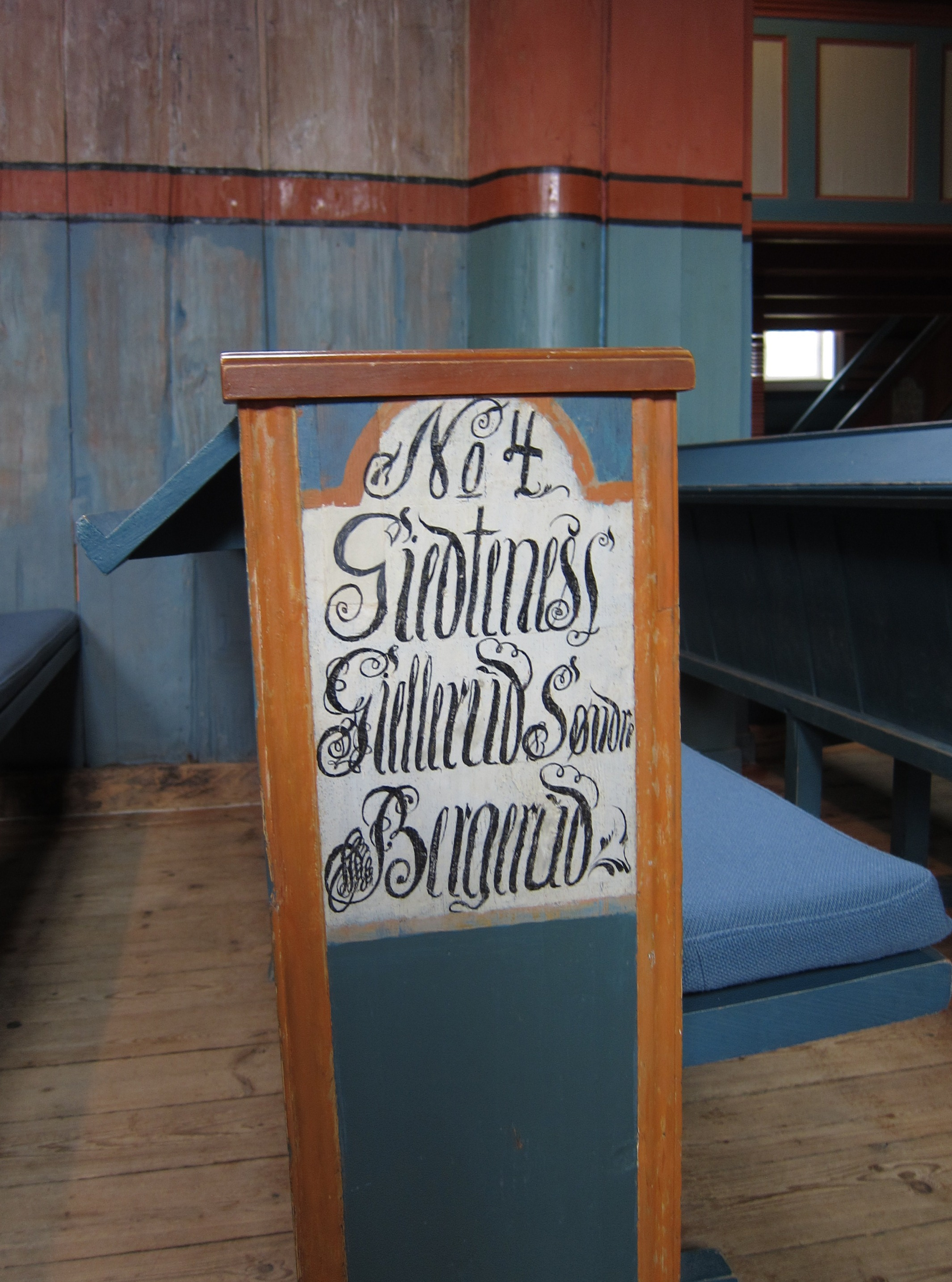
Designated benches with names and numbers

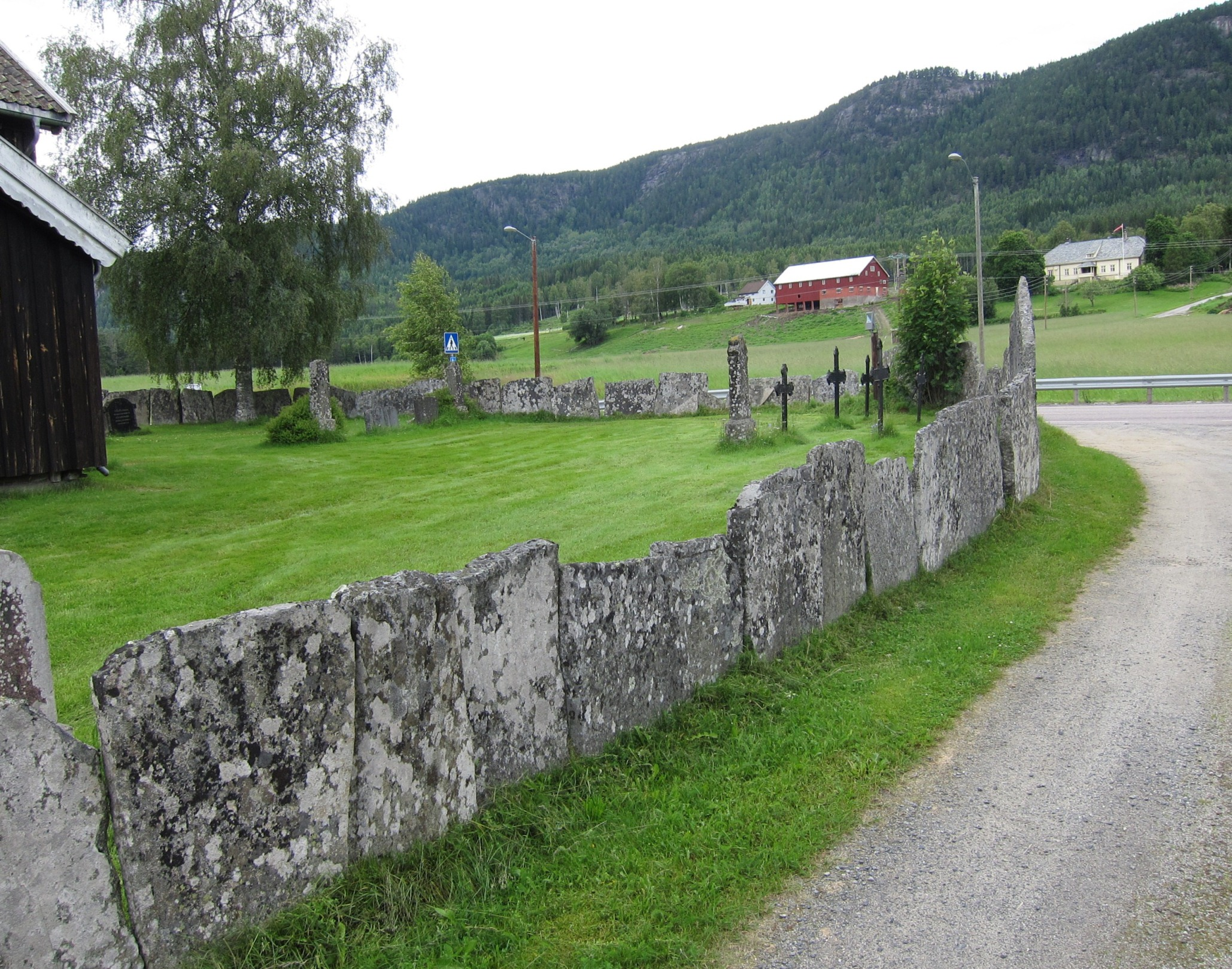
Surrounding slate fence

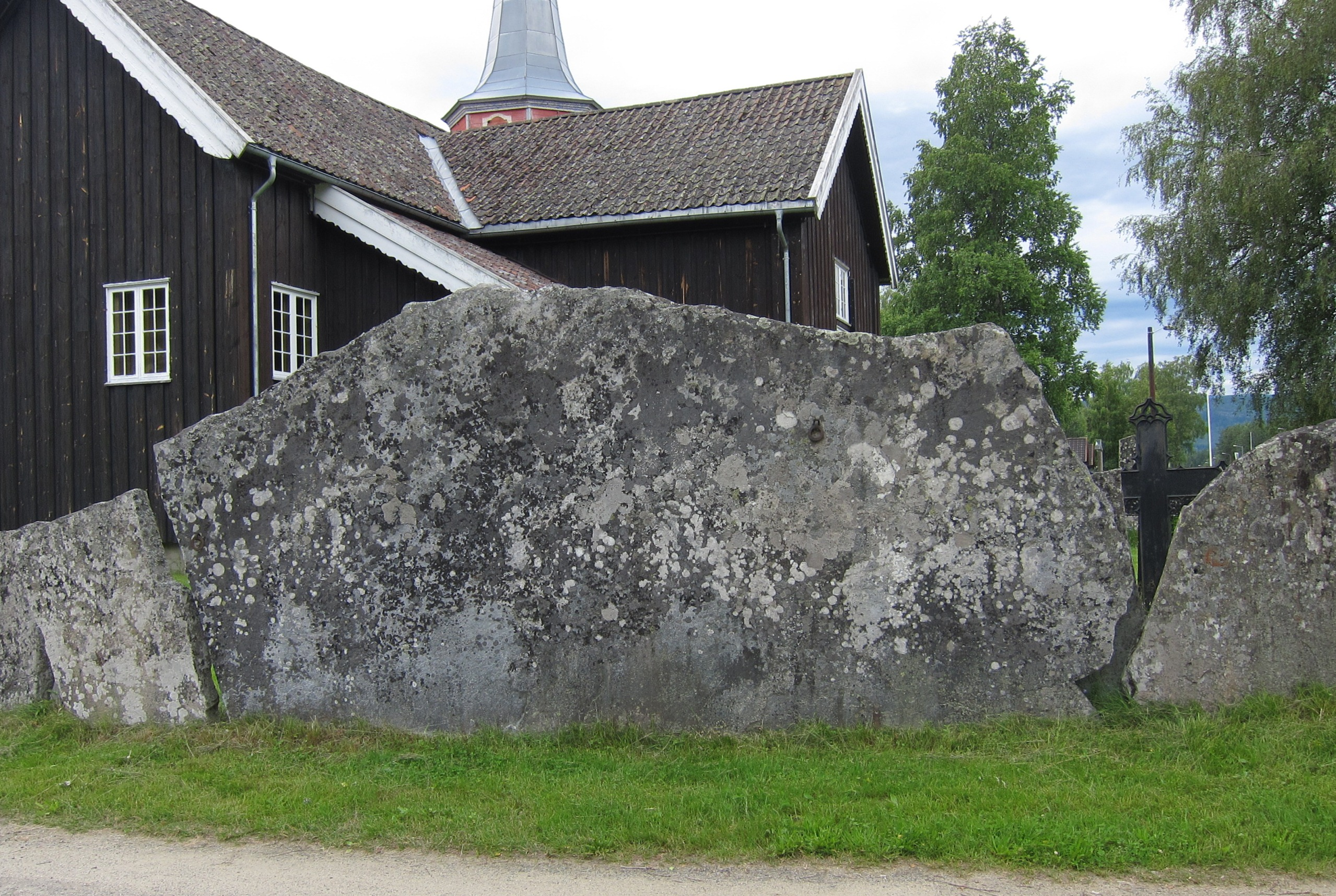
Iron ring on slate

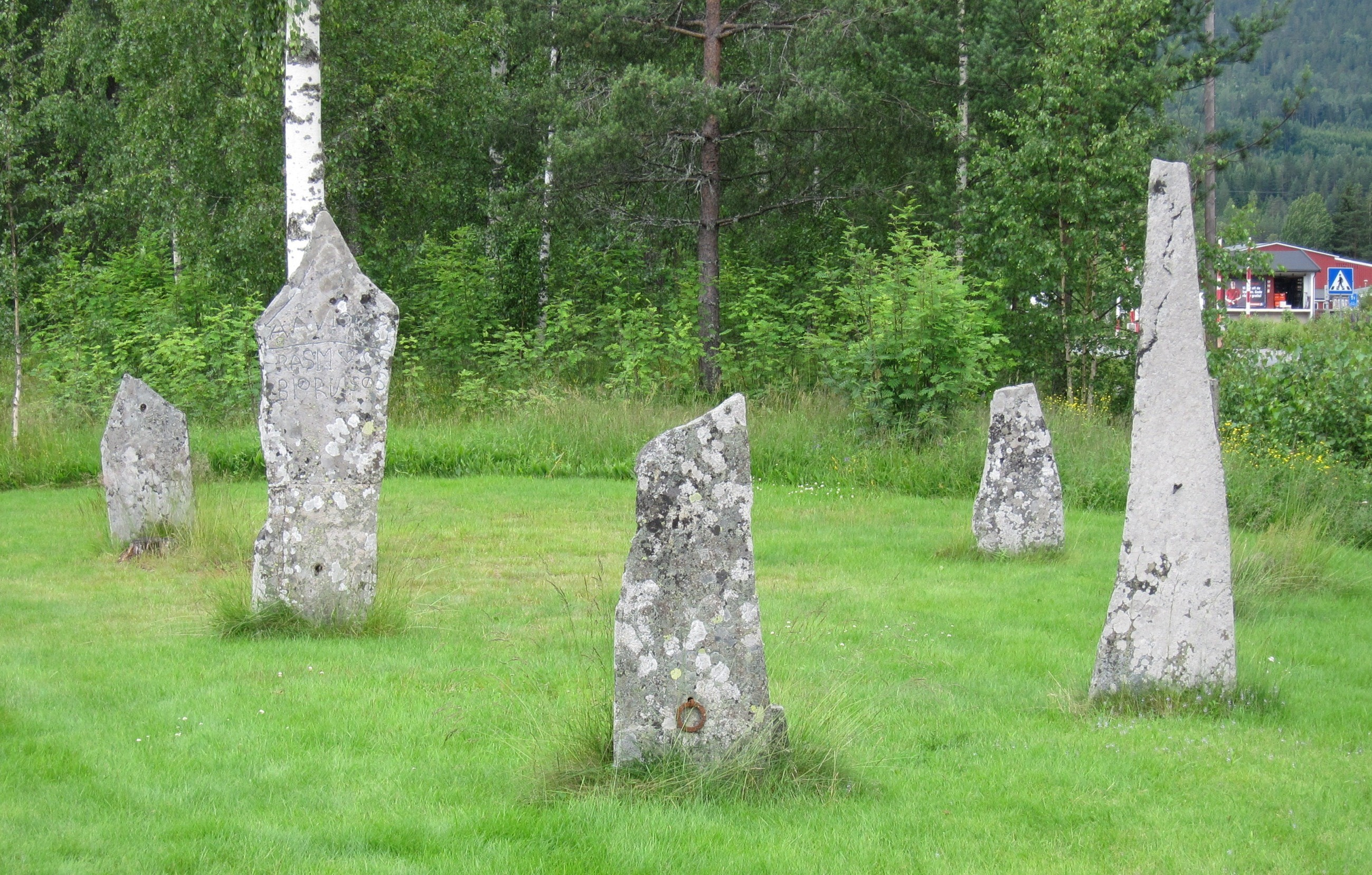
Horse field

== See also ==
- List of churches in Tunsberg

== Related reading ==
- Leif Anker (2005) The Norwegian Stave Churches (Oslo: Arfo Forlag) ISBN 978-8291399294
- Roar Hauglid (1970) Norwegian Stave Churches (Oslo: Dreyers Forlag) ISBN 978-8209106020
