= Flesberg =

Flesberg Municipality Flesberg kommune
- Municipality
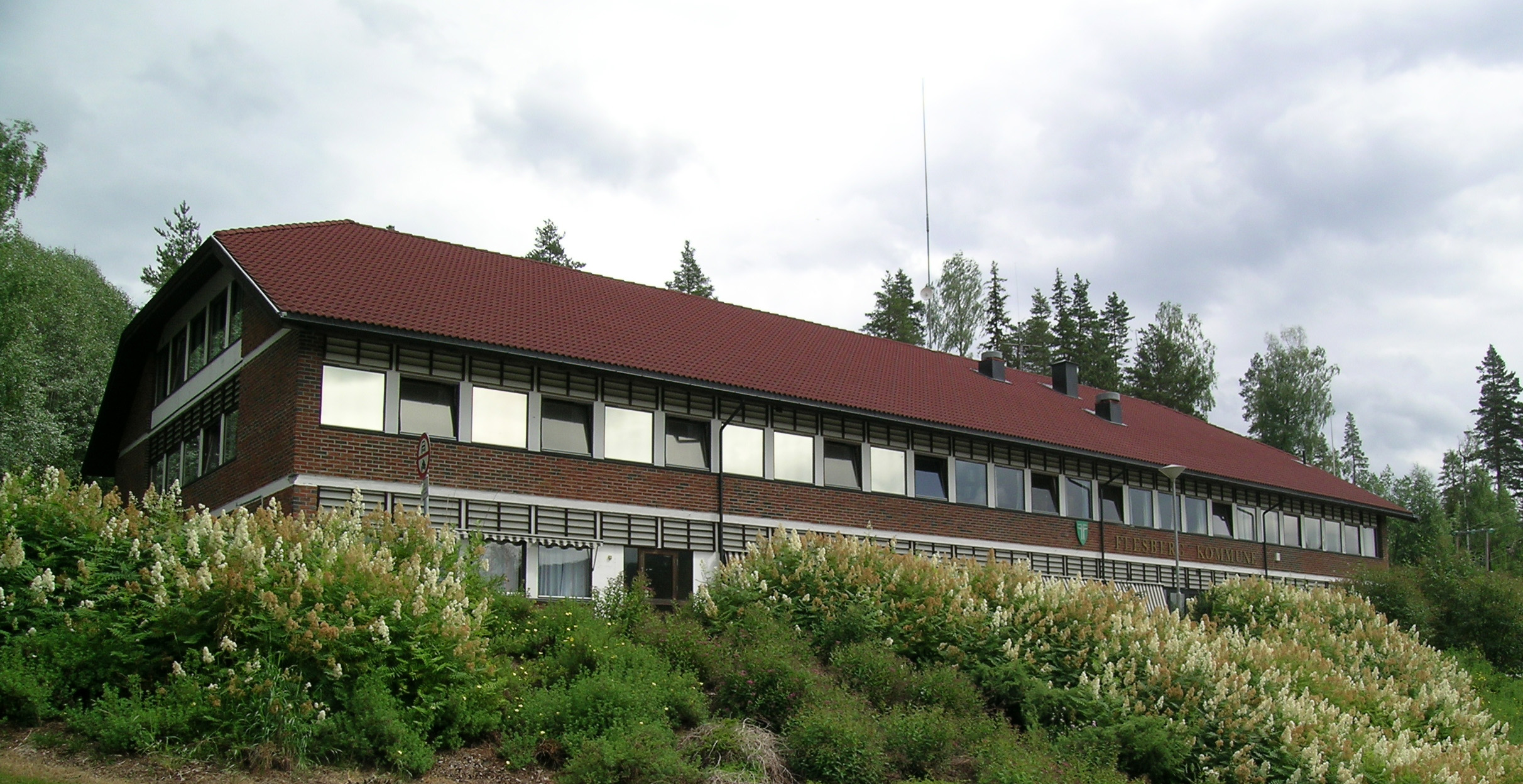
- Flesberg Council Offices at Lampeland

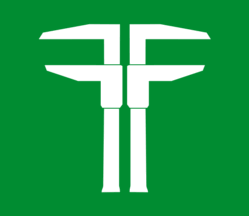
- Flag Coat of arms

- Buskerud within Norway

- Flesberg within Buskerud
- Coordinates: 59°50′52″N 9°28′56″E
- Country: Norway
- County: Buskerud
- District: Numedal
- Administrative centre: Lampeland

Government
  - Mayor (2003): Egil Langgård (Ap)

Area
  - Total: 562 km^{2} (217 sq mi)
  - Land: 538 km^{2} (208 sq mi)
  - Rank: #190 in Norway

Population (2004)
  - Total: 2,512
  - Rank: #302 in Norway
  - Density: 5/km^{2} (13/sq mi)
  - Change (10 years): ▲ +0.2%
- Demonym: Flesberging

Official language
  - Norwegian form: Bokmål
- Time zone: UTC+01:00 (CET)
  - Summer (DST): UTC+02:00 (CEST)
- ISO 3166 code: NO-3334
- Website: Official website

Flesberg is a municipality in Buskerud county, Norway. It is part of the traditional region of Numedal. The administrative centre of the municipality is the village of Lampeland.

The economy of Flesberg is dominated by forestry and agriculture, as well as the cluster of high-tech industries in neighbouring Kongsberg.

== General information ==
=== Etymology ===
The municipality (originally the parish) is named after the old Flesberg farm (Old Norse: Flesberg), since the first church was built here. The first element is fles which means "rock" and the last element is berg which means "mountain".

=== Coat-of-arms ===
The coat-of-arms is from modern times. They were granted on 10 March 1989. The arms show two tømmerklaver to represent forestry – and also the letter F.

== History ==
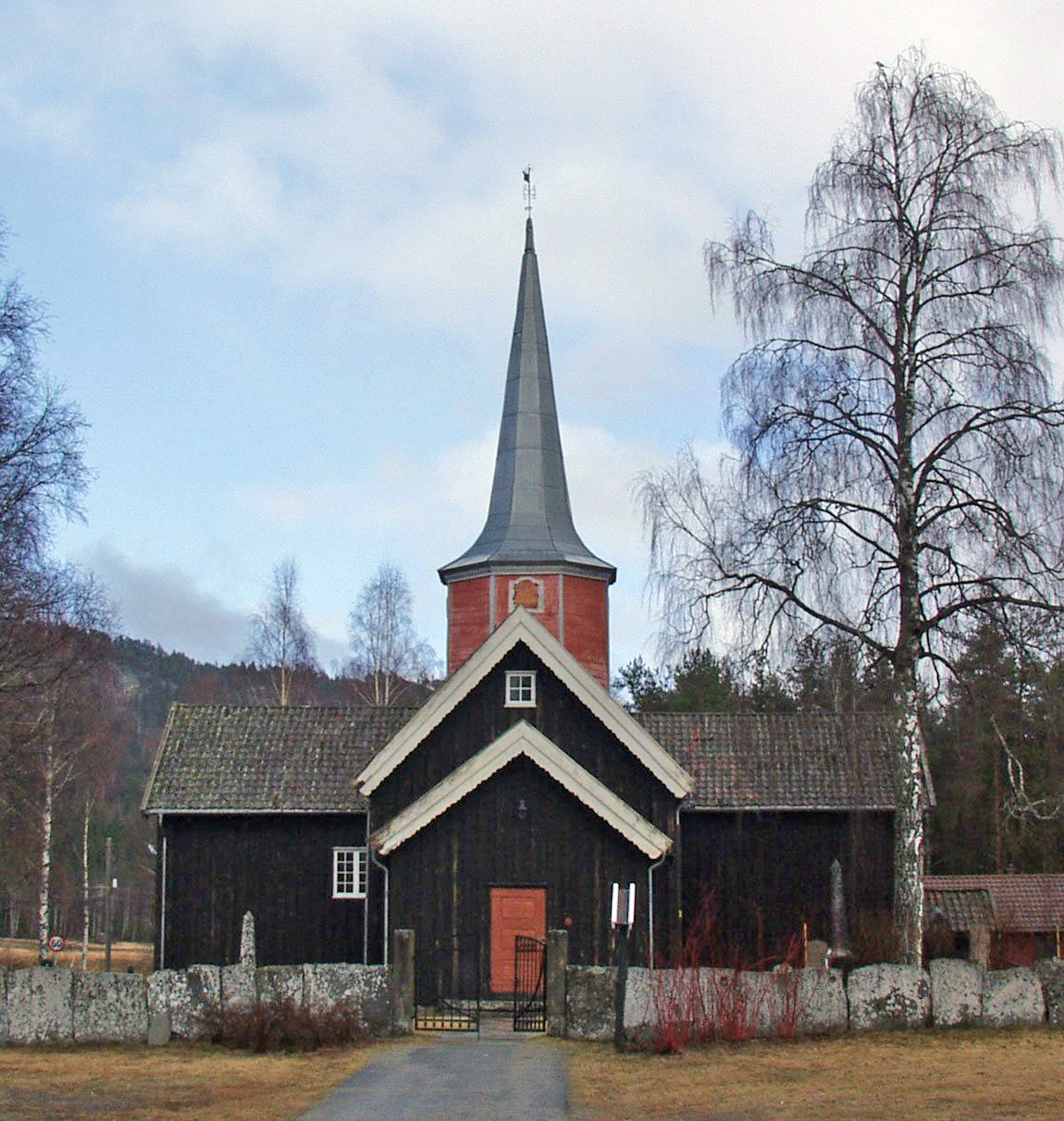
Flesberg Stave Church

Flesberg Stave Church was built around the year 1250. After reconstruction in 1735, the church conformed with cruciform plan. The municipality of Flesberg was established on 1 January 1838 (see formannskapsdistrikt). The area of Jondalen was transferred from Flesberg to the neighboring municipality of Kongsberg on 1 January 1964.

== Geography ==
The municipality is divided into the parishes Flesberg, Lyngdal, and Svene. Most of the population lives in the four villages of Svene, Lampeland, Flesberg, and Lyngdal. The municipal area is 560 square kilometres (220 mi^{2}). In the western part of Flesberg, the landscape rises steeply to the mountain area of Blefjell, a popular tourist destination.

== Demographics ==
Number of minorities (1st and 2nd generation) in Flesberg by country of origin in 2017
Ancestry	Number
Lithuania	49
Somalia	46
Poland	35
Eritrea	34
Latvia	16

== Notable people ==
- Finn Qvale (1873–1955) a military officer, cartographer and sports official
- Jul Låg (1915-2000) a scientist and soil researcher
- Hallvard Bakke (born 1943) a Norwegian politician

== Sister cities ==
The following cities are twinned with Flesberg:

- - Falkenberg, Halland County, Sweden
- - Fosston, Minnesota, United States
- - Lejre, Region Sjælland, Denmark
- - Savitaipale, Etelä-Suomi, Finland
