= Skoger Municipality =

Former municipality in Norway

Skoger Municipality Skoger herred
- Former municipality
- Skouger herred (historic name)
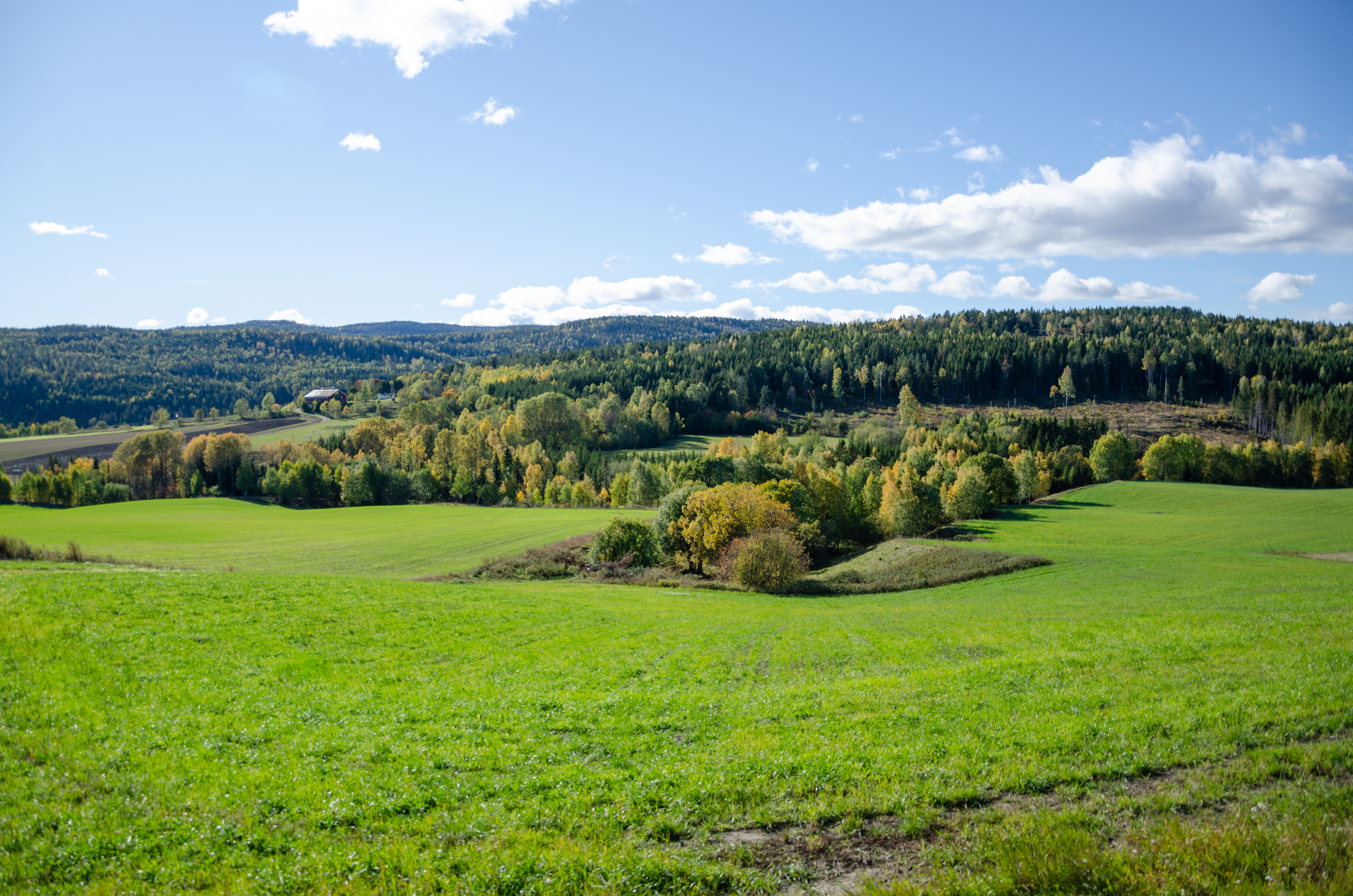

- Vestfold within Norway

- Skoger within Vestfold
- Coordinates: 59°41′13″N 10°13′23″E
- Country: Norway
- County: Vestfold
- District: Jarlsberg
- Established: 1 Jan 1838
  - Created as: Formannskapsdistrikt
- Disestablished: 1 Jan 1964
  - Succeeded by: Drammen Municipality
- Administrative centre: Skoger

Area (upon dissolution)
  - Total: 114 km^{2} (44 sq mi)

Population (1964)
  - Total: 14,672
  - Density: 129/km^{2} (333/sq mi)
- Demonym: Skaubøring

Official language
  - Norwegian form: Bokmål
- Time zone: UTC+01:00 (CET)
  - Summer (DST): UTC+02:00 (CEST)
- ISO 3166 code: NO-0712

Skoger is a former municipality in Vestfold county, Norway. The 114-square-kilometre (44 sq mi) municipality existed from 1838 until its dissolution in 1964. The area is now part of Drammen Municipality in Buskerud county. The administrative centre was the village of Skoger and the other notable village was Konnerud.

== History ==
The parish of Skouger was established as a municipality on 1 January 1838 (see formannskapsdistrikt law). In 1843, Skouger Municipality was enlarged by merging with the small neighboring municipality of Strømsgodset (population: 731) and by adding an unpopulated area of Eiker Municipality (from neighboring Buskerud county). After this change, Skouger had 2,568 residents. On 1 January 1870, an area of northern Skoger (population: 1,363) was transferred into the neighboring town of Drammen (and also switching to the neighboring Buskerud county).

During the 1960s, there were many municipal mergers across Norway due to the work of the Schei Committee. On 1 January 1964, Skoger Municipality (population: 14,682) was merged with Drammen Municipality (population: 31,478) to form a new, larger Drammen Municipality. Since Drammen was in the neighboring county of Buskerud, Skoger also had to join Buskerud county.

=== Name ===
The municipality (originally the parish) is named after the village of Skoger (Old Norse: Skógar) since the Old Skoger Church was built there. The name is derived from the plural]form of skógr which means "woodland" or "forest". Prior to 1889, the name was spelled Skouger.

=== Churches ===
The Church of Norway had two parishes (sokn) within the municipality of Skoger. At the time of the municipal dissolution, it was part of the Nord-Jarlsberg prosti (deanery) in the Diocese of Tunsberg.

Churches in Skoger
Parish (sokn)	Church name	Location of the church	Year built
Konnerud	Konnerud Church	Konnerud	1996
Konnerud	Old Konnerud Church	Konnerud	1858
Skoger	Skoger Church	Skoger	1886
Skoger	Old Skoger Church	Skoger	c. 1200

== Government ==
Skoger Municipality was responsible for primary education (through 10th grade), outpatient health services, senior citizen services, unemployment, social services, zoning, economic development, and municipal roads. During its existence, this municipality was governed by a municipal council of directly elected representatives. The mayor was indirectly elected by a vote of the municipal council.

=== Mayors ===
The mayors (Norwegian: ordfører) of Skoger:

- 1838–1841: Rasmus Christensen
- 1842–1843: Nils Nilsen
- 1844–1853: Gabriel Smith
- 1854–1861: Knut Schartum
- 1862–1865: Jacob Gulliksen Styrmoe
- 1866–1869: Augustinus Olsen Kopperud
- 1870–1873: Jacob Gulliksen Styrmoe
- 1874–1875: Nils Peter Wølner Hansen
- 1876–1904: Lauritz Christiansen Hervig
- 1905–1910: Fredrik Frodesen Sand
- 1911–1913: Gustav Martinius Olsen
- 1914–1916: Fredrik Frodesen Sand
- 1917–1919: Jørgen Andvik
- 1920–1925: Arne Nicolai Anchersen (Bp)
- 1926–1928: Borgar Steinset (Ap)
- 1929–1931: Arne Nicolai Anchersen (Bp)
- 1932–1940: Borgar Steinset (Ap)
- 1941–1942: Einar Hjelmsø (NS)
- 1943–1945: Karl Hugo Malmkvist (NS)
- 1946–1957: Einar Aass (Ap)
- 1958–1961: Finn Grønland
- 1962–1963: Einar Mortensen

=== Municipal council ===
The municipal council (Herredsstyre) of Skoger was made up of 41 representatives that were elected to four-year terms. The tables below show the historical composition of the council by political party.

Skoger herredsstyre 1959–1963
Party name (in Norwegian)	Number of representatives
Labour Party (Arbeiderpartiet)	23
Conservative Party (Høyre)	12
Communist Party (Kommunistiske Parti)	1
Christian Democratic Party (Kristelig Folkeparti)	4
Centre Party (Senterpartiet)	1
Total number of members:	41
Note: On 1 January 1964, Skoger Municipality was merged into Drammen Municipality.

Skoger herredsstyre 1955–1959
Party name (in Norwegian)	Number of representatives
Labour Party (Arbeiderpartiet)	23
Conservative Party (Høyre)	2
Christian Democratic Party (Kristelig Folkeparti)	10
Farmers' Party (Bondepartiet)	1
Liberal Party (Venstre)	4
List of workers, fishermen, and small farmholders (Arbeidere, fiskere, småbrukere liste)	1
Total number of members:	41

Skoger herredsstyre 1951–1955
Party name (in Norwegian)	Number of representatives
Labour Party (Arbeiderpartiet)	22
Conservative Party (Høyre)	11
Communist Party (Kommunistiske Parti)	3
Christian Democratic Party (Kristelig Folkeparti)	4
Farmers' Party (Bondepartiet)	1
Total number of members:	41

Skoger herredsstyre 1947–1951
Party name (in Norwegian)	Number of representatives
Labour Party (Arbeiderpartiet)	21
Conservative Party (Høyre)	6
Communist Party (Kommunistiske Parti)	4
Christian Democratic Party (Kristelig Folkeparti)	4
Joint List(s) of Non-Socialist Parties (Borgerlige Felleslister)	6
Total number of members:	41

Skoger herredsstyre 1945–1947
Party name (in Norwegian)	Number of representatives
Labour Party (Arbeiderpartiet)	22
Conservative Party (Høyre)	4
Communist Party (Kommunistiske Parti)	5
Christian Democratic Party (Kristelig Folkeparti)	6
Joint List(s) of Non-Socialist Parties (Borgerlige Felleslister)	4
Total number of members:	41

Skoger herredsstyre 1937–1941*
Party name (in Norwegian)	Number of representatives
Labour Party (Arbeiderpartiet)	25
Joint List(s) of Non-Socialist Parties (Borgerlige Felleslister)	13
Local List(s) (Lokale lister)	3
Total number of members:	41
Note: Due to the German occupation of Norway during World War II, no elections were held for new municipal councils until after the war ended in 1945.

== See also ==
- List of former municipalities of Norway
