= Old Konnerud Church =

Church in Buskerud, Norway

- Konnerud gamle kirke
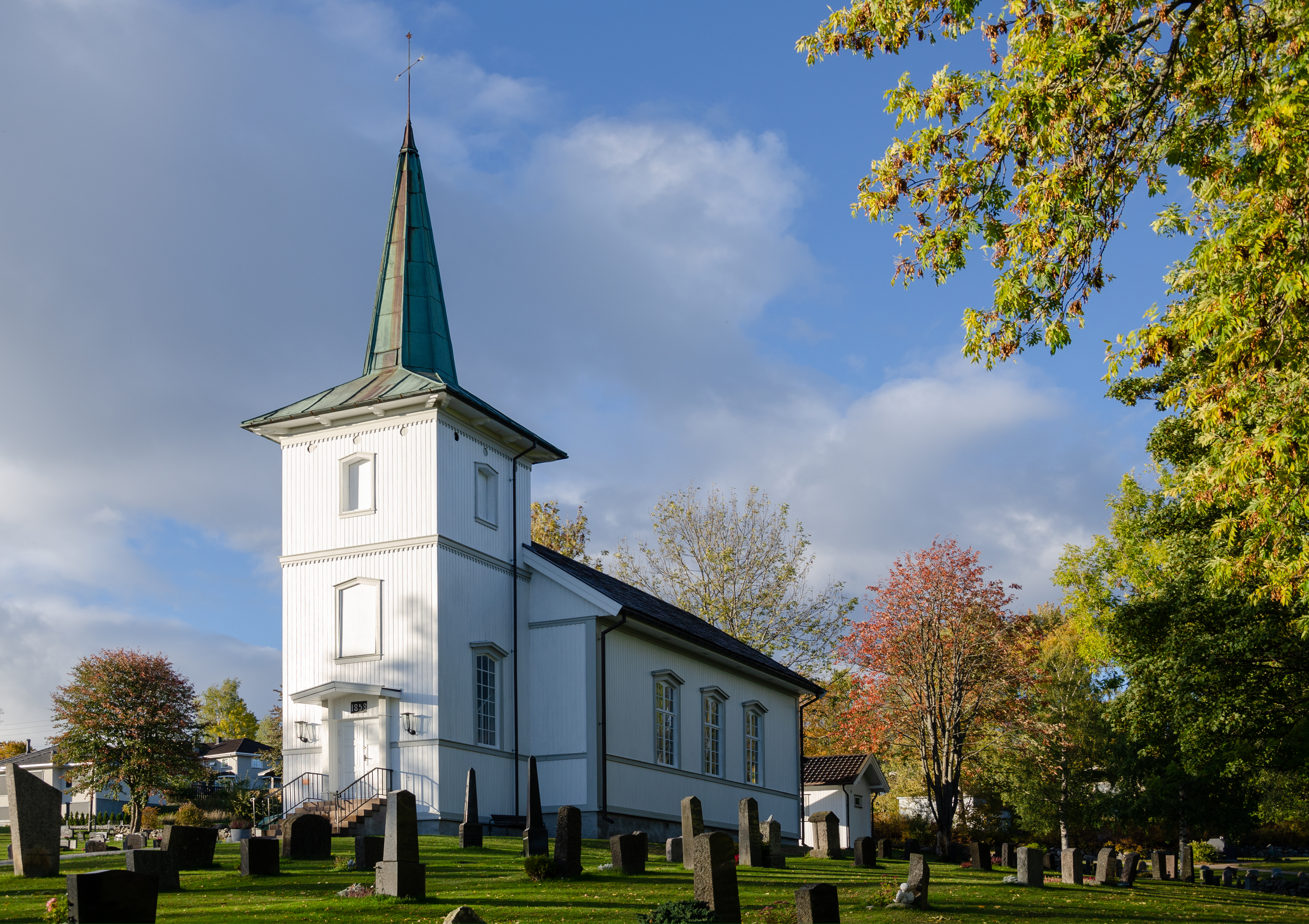
- View of the church
- Old Konnerud Church
- 59°43′14″N 10°08′26″E
- Location: Drammen Municipality, Buskerud
- Country: Norway
- Denomination: Church of Norway
- Churchmanship: Evangelical Lutheran

History
- Status: Parish church
- Founded: 1760
- Consecrated: 28 March 1858

Architecture
- Functional status: Active
- Architect: Wilhelm Hanstein
- Architectural type: Long church
- Completed: 1858 (168 years ago)

Specifications
- Capacity: 300
- Materials: Wood

Administration
- Diocese: Tunsberg
- Deanery: Drammen og Lier prosti
- Parish: Konnerud
- Norwegian Cultural Heritage Site
- Type: Church
- Status: Automatically protected
- ID: 84815

Old Konnerud Church (Norwegian: Konnerud gamle kirke) is a parish church of the Church of Norway in Drammen Municipality in Buskerud county, Norway. It is located in the village of Konnerud. It is one of the churches for the Konnerud parish which is part of the Drammen og Lier prosti (deanery) in the Diocese of Tunsberg. The white, wooden church was built in a long church design in 1858 using plans drawn up by the architect Wilhelm Hanstein. The church seats about 300 people.

== History ==
In connection with Count Frederik Anton Wedel Jarlsberg's mining activities in the area, permission was granted in the 1730s to build a cemetery in Konnerud. The cemetery was consecrated in 1737. Finances did not allow for the construction of a church at the site, although planning for a church began in the 1740s. Until a church could be built, residents had to go to Skoger Church for services. In 1760, the first Konnerud Chapel was built, on a site about 150 metres (490 ft) south of where the church now stands. It was a simple building with a gable roof and six windows. The chapel did not get a tower until 1794. Before that, the bells hung in a cast-iron pot. The interior was also simple, with no altarpiece or decorations to speak of. Eventually the chapel fell into disrepair, and plans for a new church building were made.

In 1857, a new church was designed by architect Wilhelm Hanstein. The new church was consecrated on 28 March 1858 as an annex chapel to the main Skoger Church. It is a simple wooden long church with a tower at the entrance. The nave is rectangular, and the choir is in the same room, with an extension that housed a sacristy.

Due to strong population growth in Konnerud during the 1970s and 1980s when the population of the area increased from 2500 to 9000, a new church was required. The new Konnerud Church was built in 1996 about 1 kilometre (0.62 mi) to the southeast of the old church. The new church was consecrated in October 1996. The "old" Konnerud Church was then taken out of regular use as a parish church is now used for about 40–50 services a year, mainly for weddings and funerals rather than usual weekly worship services. The church was set on fire by arson on the night of 3 June 2004, but the fire was observed early by neighbors and the fire was extinguished before much damage occurred.

== Media gallery ==

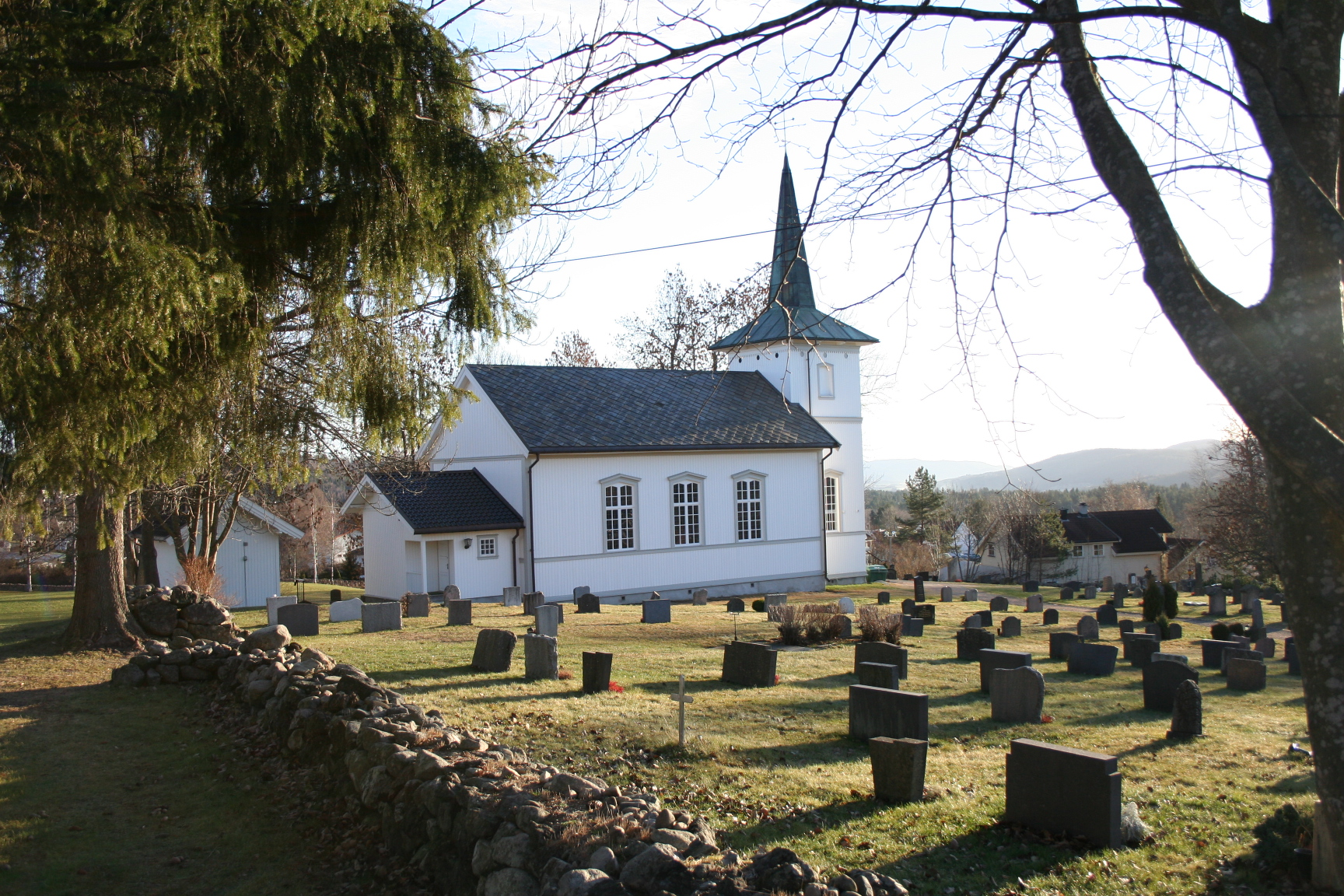

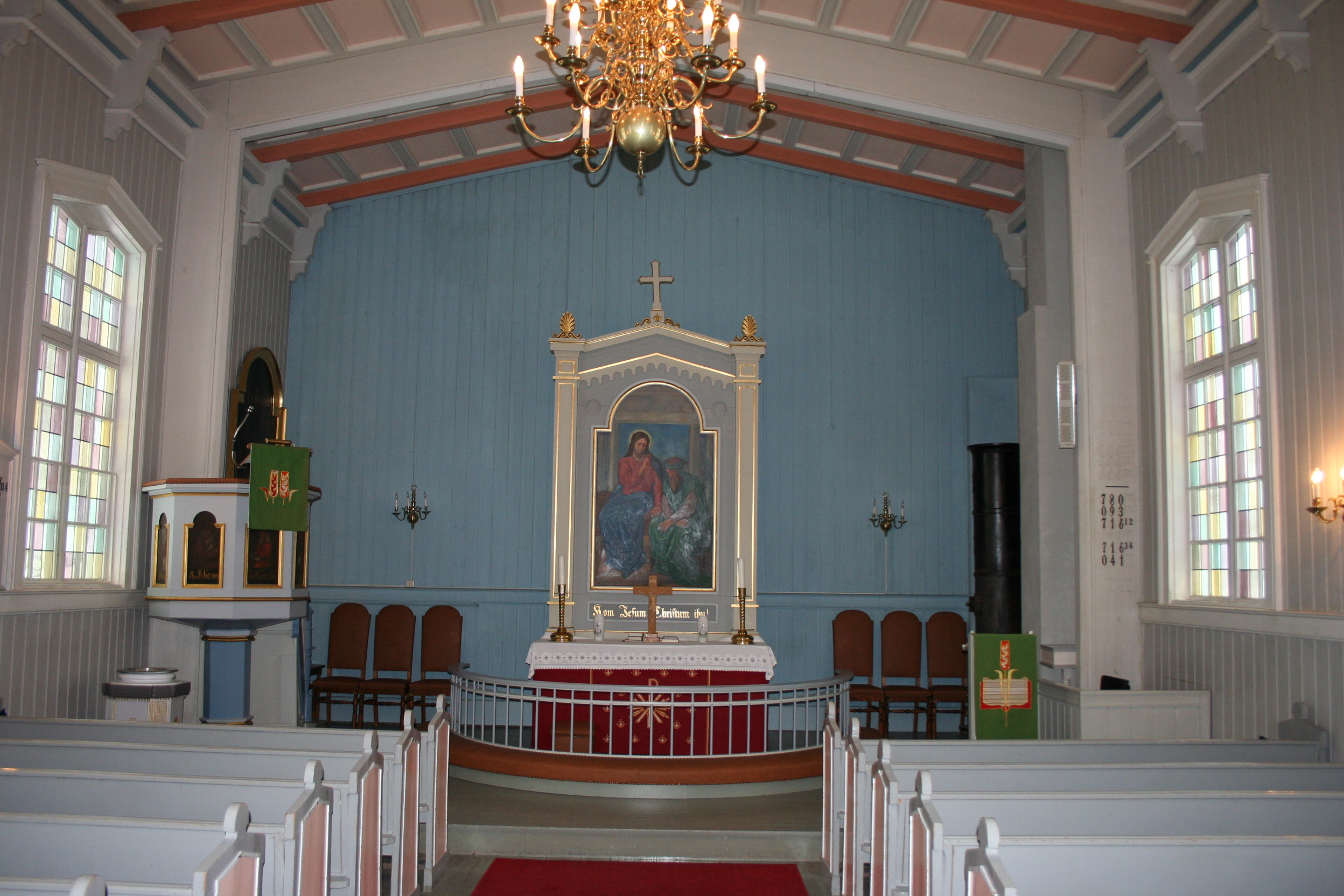

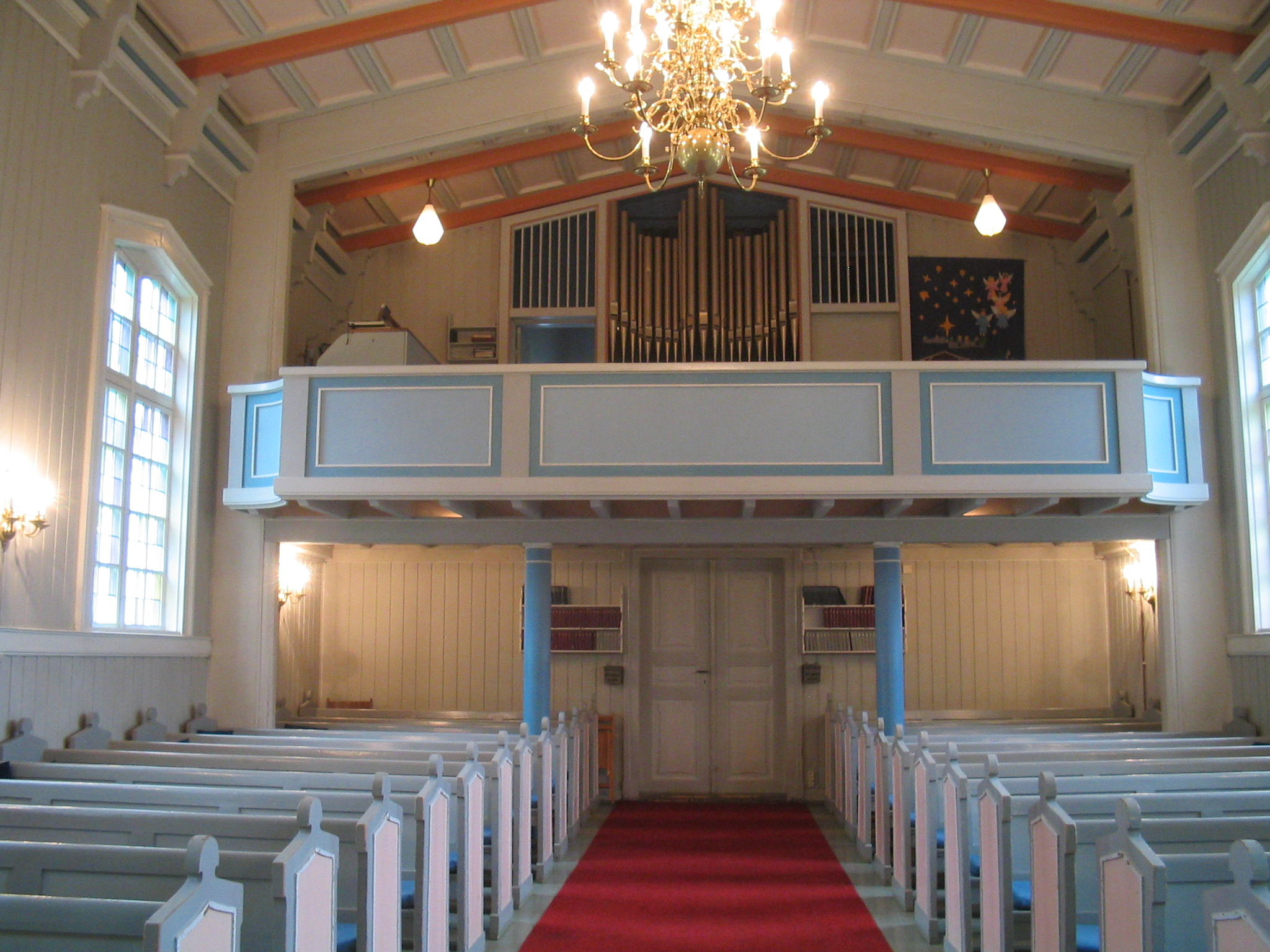

== See also ==
- List of churches in Tunsberg
