= Konnerud Church =

Church in Buskerud, Norway

- Konnerud kirke
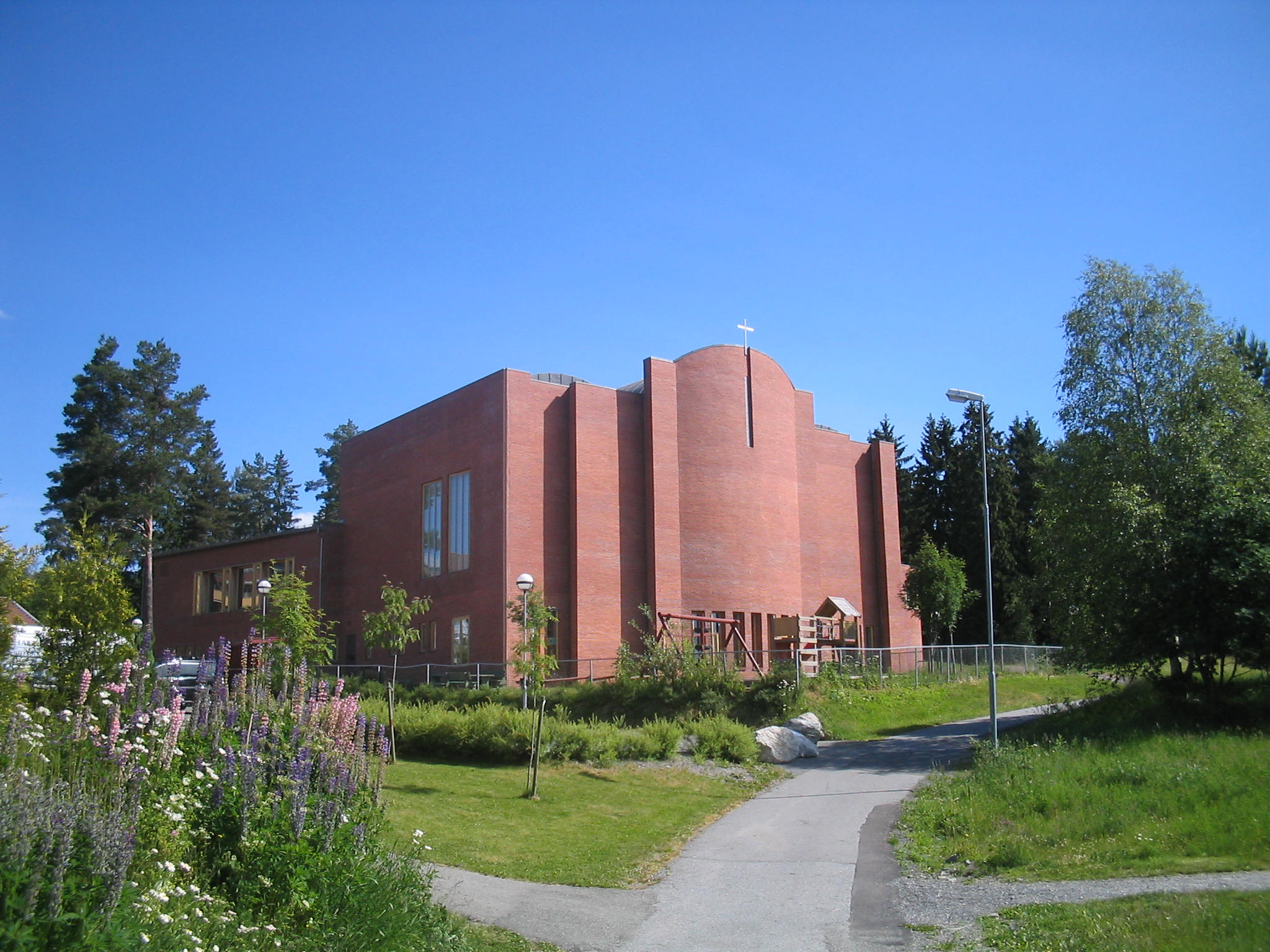
- View of the church
- Konnerud Church
- 59°43′02″N 10°09′11″E
- Location: Drammen Municipality, Buskerud
- Country: Norway
- Denomination: Church of Norway
- Churchmanship: Evangelical Lutheran

History
- Status: Parish church
- Founded: 1996
- Consecrated: 6 Oct 1996

Architecture
- Functional status: Active
- Architect: Harald Hille
- Architectural type: Fan-shaped
- Groundbreaking: 12 June 1994
- Completed: 1996 (30 years ago)

Specifications
- Capacity: 540
- Materials: Brick

Administration
- Diocese: Tunsberg bispedømme
- Deanery: Drammen og Lier prosti
- Parish: Konnerud
- Norwegian Cultural Heritage Site
- Type: Church
- Status: Not protected
- ID: 84815

Konnerud Church (Norwegian: Konnerud kirke) is a parish church of the Church of Norway in Drammen Municipality in Buskerud county, Norway. It is located in the village of Konnerud. It is the main church for the Konnerud parish which is part of the Drammen og Lier prosti (deanery) in the Diocese of Tunsberg. The red brick church was built in a fan-shaped design in 1996 using plans drawn up by the architect Harald Hille. The church seats about 540 people.

== History ==
The Old Konnerud Church was built for the miners in the Konnerud area in 1858. Later, Konnerud has become a distinct suburb of the growing city of Drammen. The population in the area increased from approximately 3,700 in 1970 to almost 10,000 in the mid-1990s, and the old church became too small for the parish. In 1979, a foundation was established with the aim of having a new and contemporary church built on the site. A dispute over the choice of site broke out with those wanting to build a new church on the same site as the old church and another group wanting to move the church. This dispute ended with the new church being located in Gåserud, about 1 kilometre (0.62 mi) to the southeast of the old church. The new church was designed by Harald Hille. The foundation stone was laid on 12 June 1994 and the church was consecrated on 6 October 1996. Since the opening of the new church, the Old Konnerund Church is no longer used for regular weekly services, but is mostly used for special occasions such as weddings and funerals.

== Media gallery ==
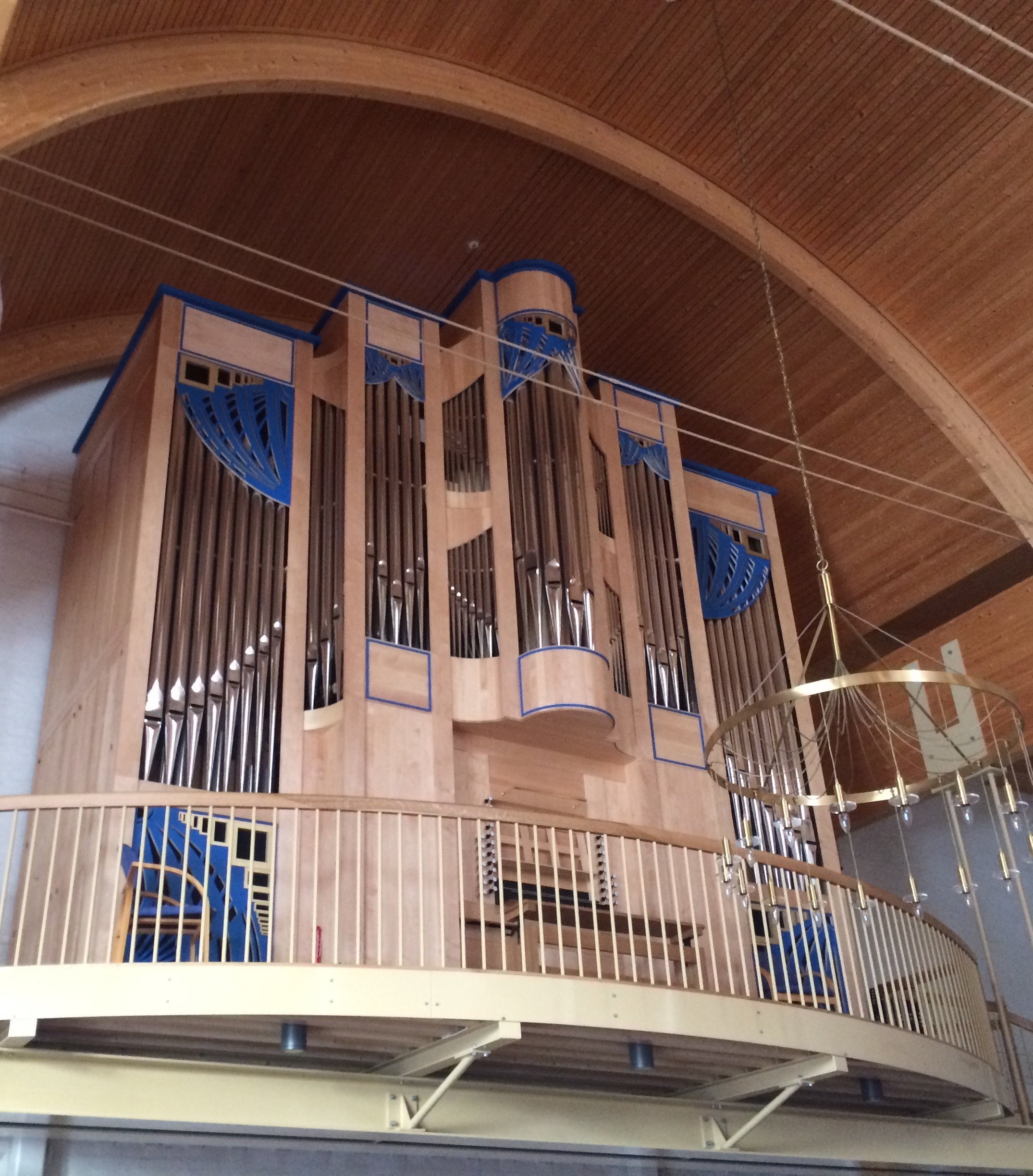

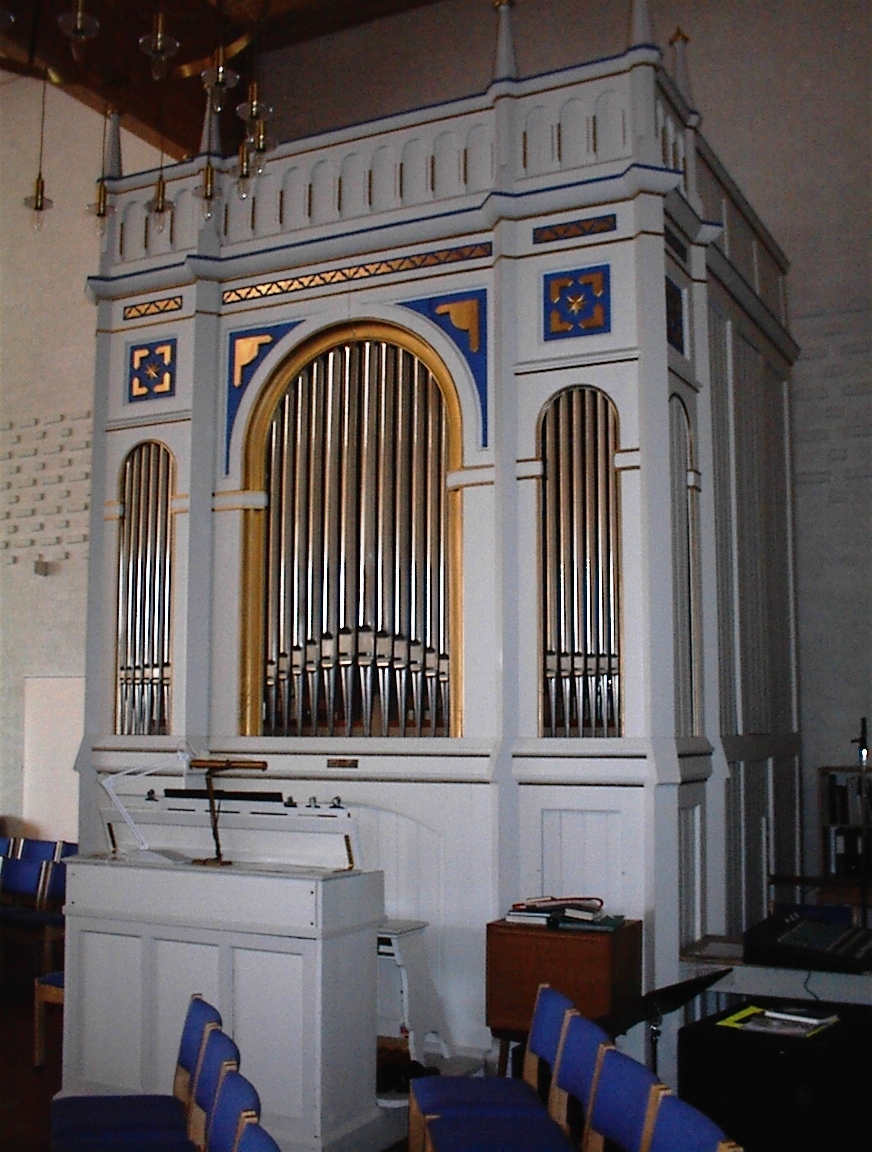

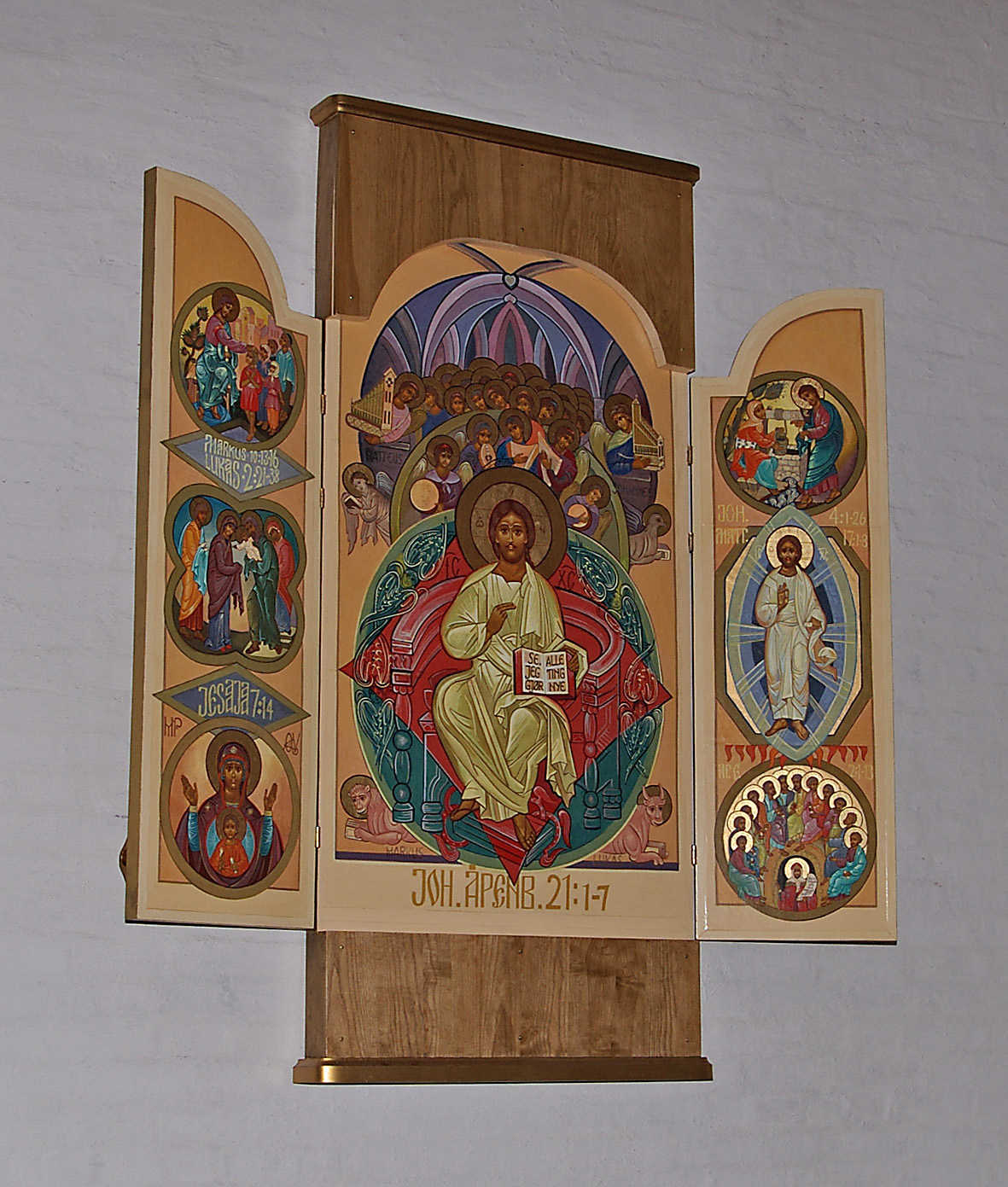

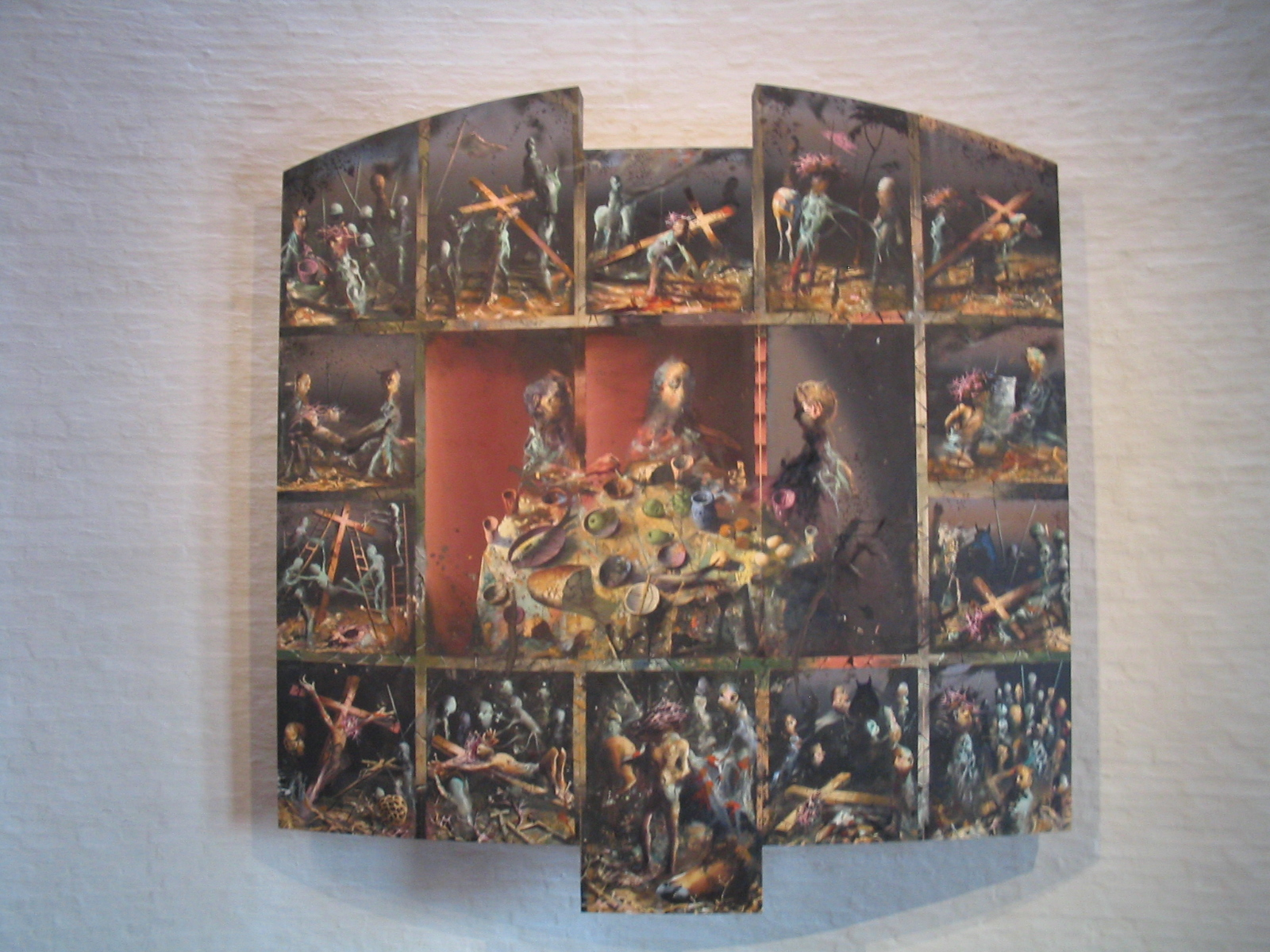

== See also ==
- List of churches in Tunsberg
