= Skoger =

Village in Drammen, Norway

- Village
- Location of the village Skoger (Norway)
- Coordinates: 59.68681°N 10.22303°E
- Country: Norway
- Region: Eastern Norway
- County: Buskerud
- Municipality: Drammen Municipality

Area
  - Total: 0.81 km^{2} (0.31 sq mi)
- Elevation: 150 m (490 ft)

Population (2012)
  - Total: 1,206
  - Density: 1,500/km^{2} (3,900/sq mi)
- Time zone: UTC+01:00 (CET)
  - Summer (DST): UTC+02:00 (CEST)
- Post Code: 3039 Drammen

Skoger is a village in Drammen Municipality in Buskerud county, Norway. The village is located just north of the Vestfold county border, about 6 kilometres (3.7 mi) south of the centre of the town of Drammen. The villages of Klever and Eikeberg are located about 4 kilometres (2.5 mi) to the south and the village of Sande i Vestfold is located about 11 kilometres (6.8 mi) to the south.

The 0.81-square-kilometre (200-acre) village had a population (2012) of 1,206 and a population density of 1,489 inhabitants per square kilometre (3,860/sq mi). Since 2012, the population and area data for this village area has not been separately tracked by Statistics Norway and it has been considered a suburban part of the urban town of Drammen.

== History ==
Historically the area had large forested areas, and much arable land. Reference to Skoger is made in the land register maintained by Bishop Eystein Erlendsson (Biskop Eysteins jordebok). The parish of Skouger was established as a municipality 1 January 1838 under of the law of formannskapsdistrikt. This provision of the Constitution of Norway, required that every parish (Norwegian: prestegjeld) form a local self-government district. Skoger with 1,837 inhabitants merged with Strømsgodset with 731 inhabitants, as well as an uninhabited part of Eiker on 1 January 1844. The enlarged Skoger municipality had a population of 2,568. Until 1889 the name was written Skouger.

A part of Skoger was moved to Drammen on 1 January 1870. The rest of Skoger was incorporated into Drammen on 1 January 1964. This entailed a border adjustment by which Skoger became a part of Buskerud county.

=== Name ===
The municipality (originally the parish) is named after the village of Skoger (Old Norse: Skógar) since the Old Skoger Church was built there. The name is derived from the plural form of skógr which means "woodland" or "forest". Prior to 1889, the name was spelled Skouger.

== Skoger Parish ==
Skoger has two parish churches both of which are part of the Church of Norway and belongs to the Drammen og Lier prosti in the Diocese of Tunsberg. Access to both sites is via Norwegian National Road 33 ( FV33). Skoger Church (Skoger kirke) was inaugurated on 9 December 1885. It is built of brick stone and has 300 seats. The Old Skoger Church (Skoger gamle kirke) has an estimated date of origin of between 1200 and 1220 and is one of Drammen's oldest buildings.

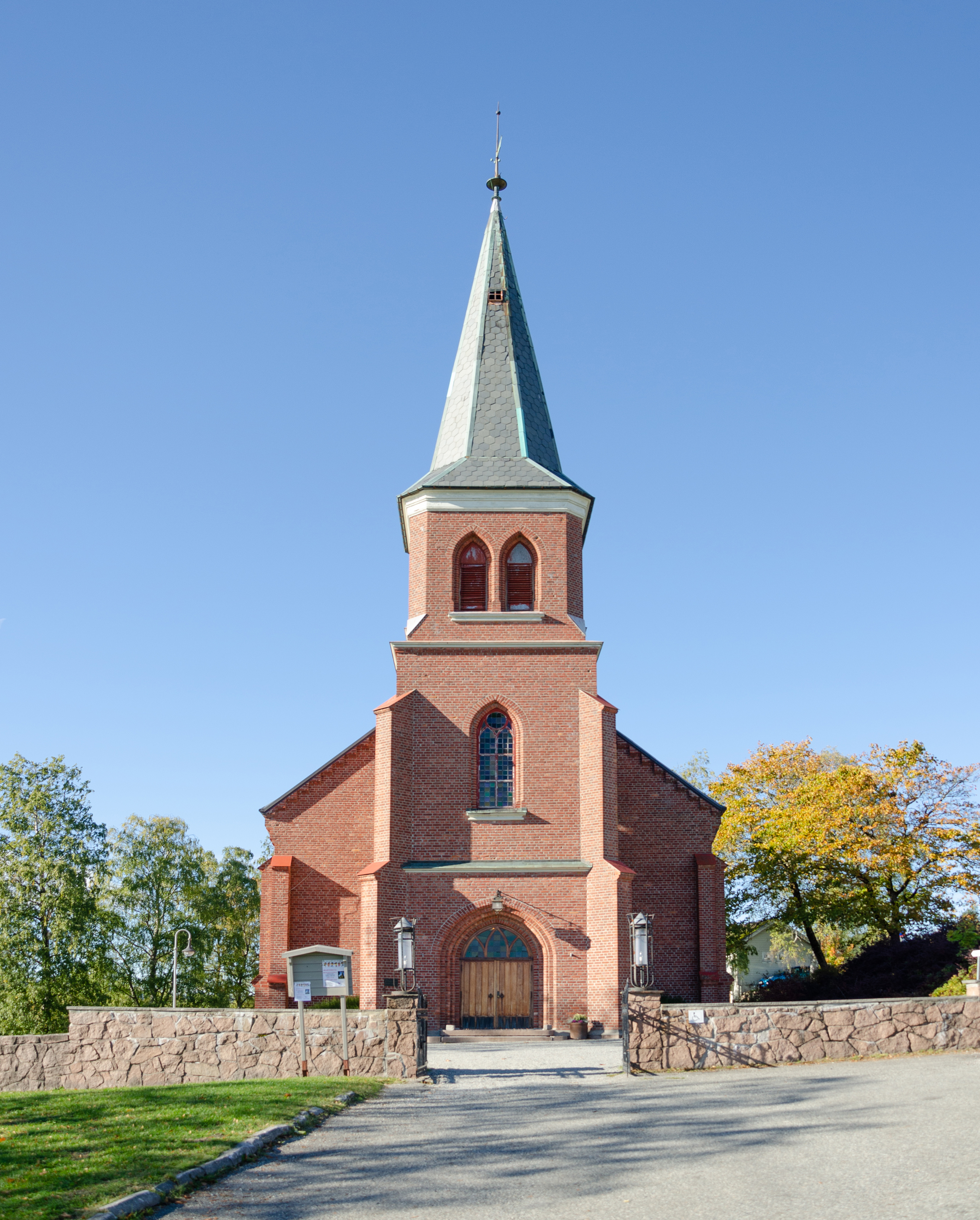
Skoger Church

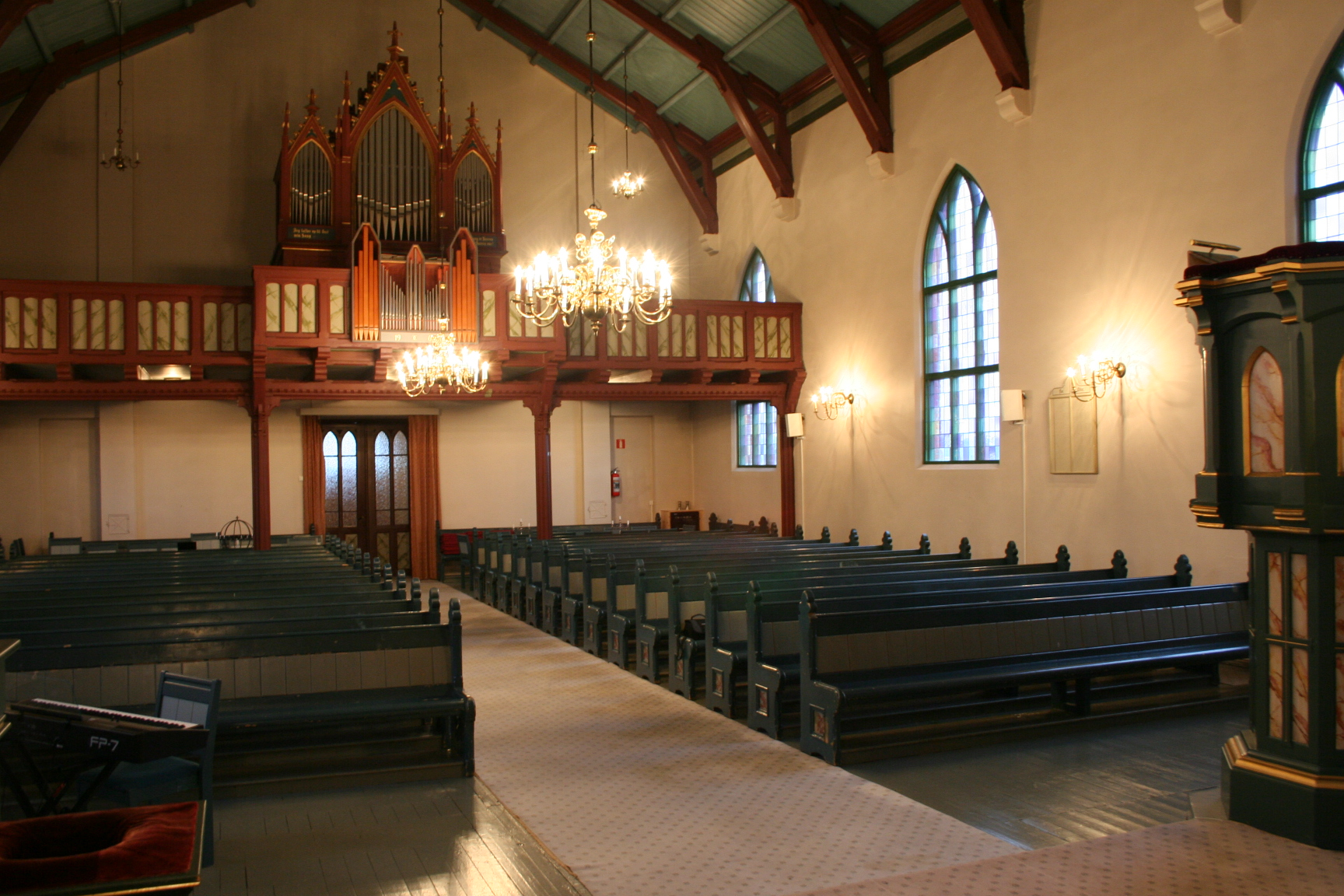
Skoger Church sanctuary

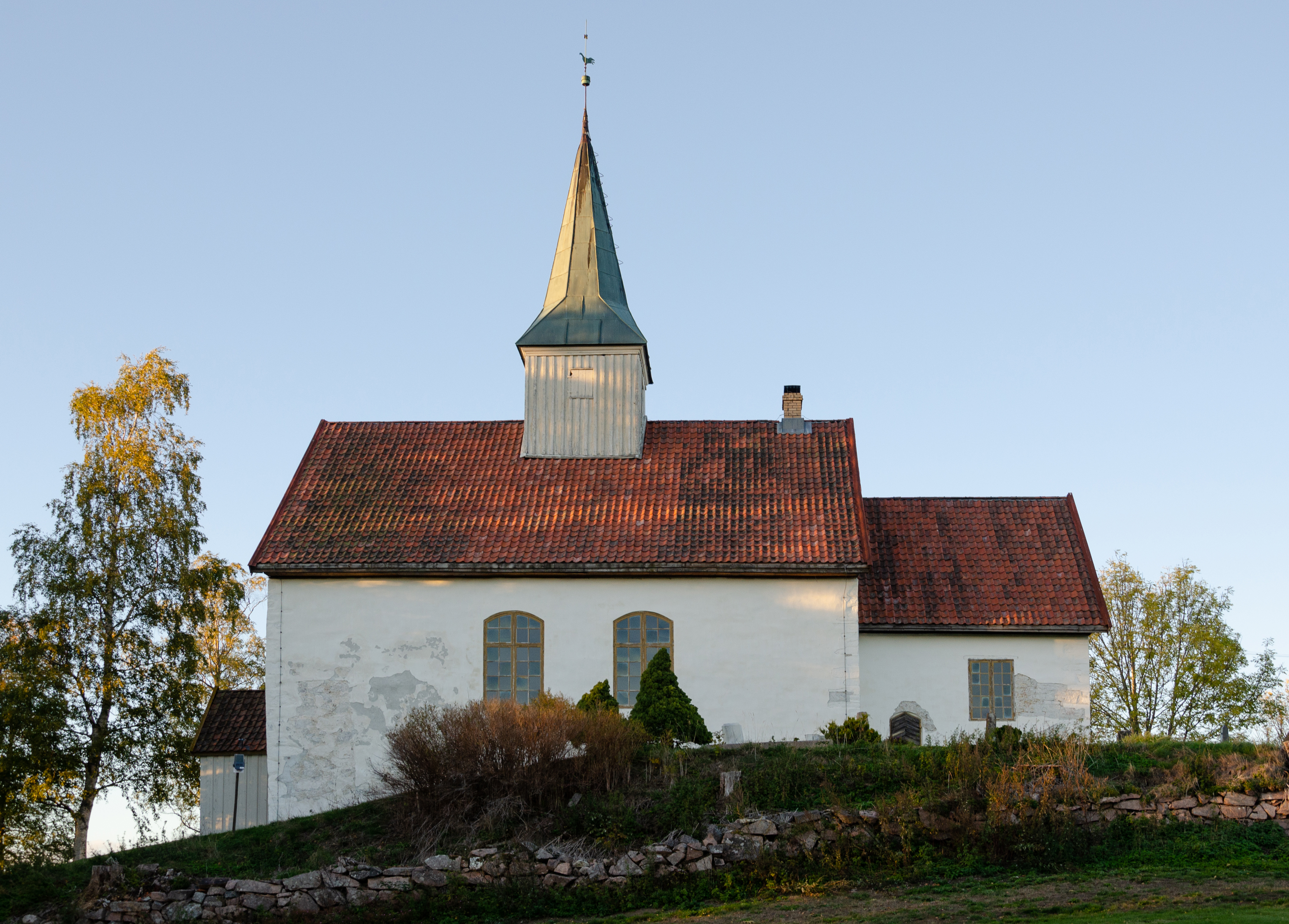
Old Skoger Church
