= Skoger Church =

Church in Buskerud, Norway

- Skoger kirke
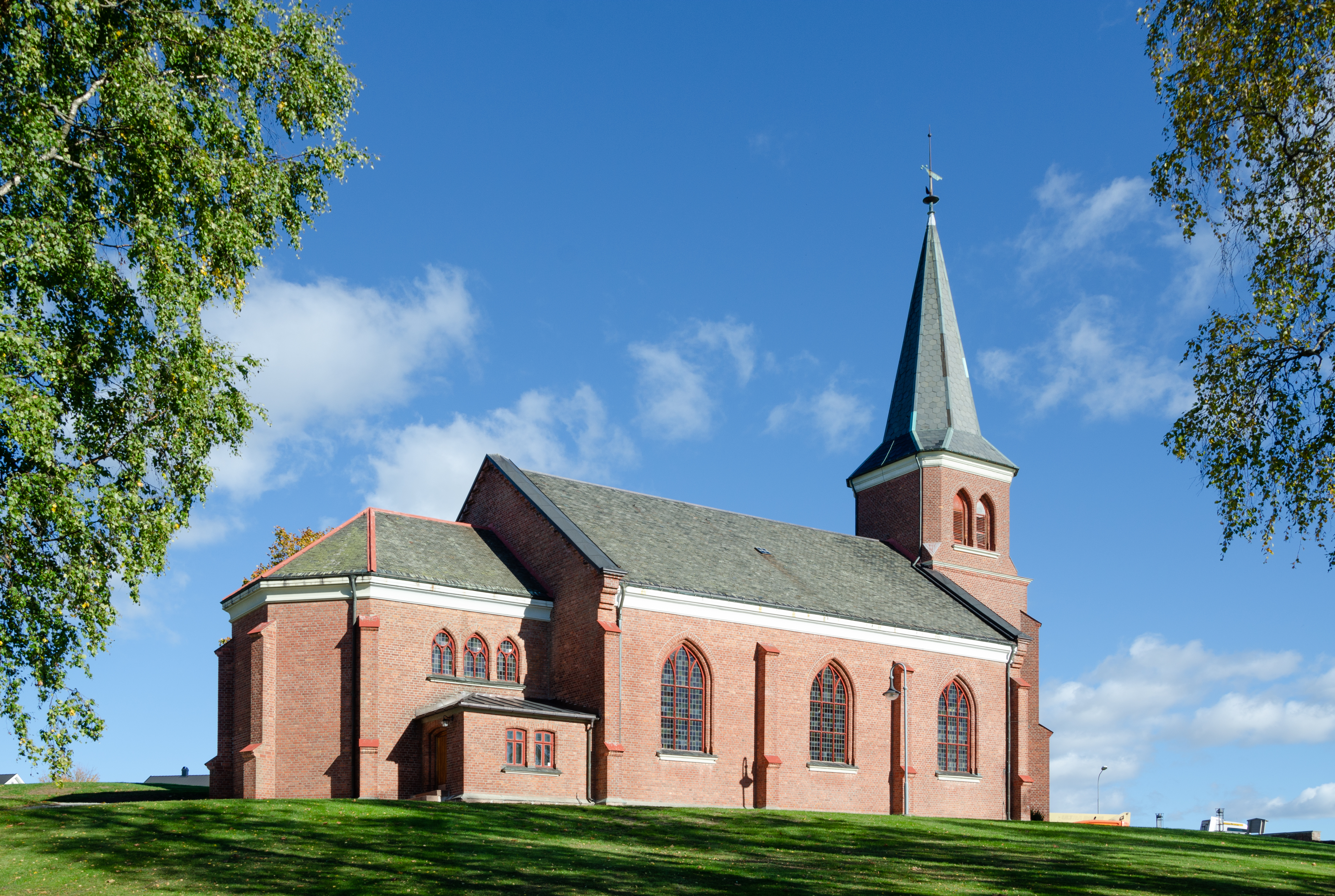
- View of the church
- Skoger Church
- 59°41′14″N 10°13′20″E
- Location: Drammen, Buskerud
- Country: Norway
- Denomination: Church of Norway
- Churchmanship: Evangelical Lutheran

History
- Status: Parish church
- Founded: 1885
- Consecrated: 9 Dec 1885

Architecture
- Functional status: Active
- Architect: Henrik Thrap-Meyer
- Architectural type: Long church
- Completed: 1885 (141 years ago)

Specifications
- Capacity: 500
- Materials: Brick

Administration
- Diocese: Tunsberg
- Deanery: Drammen og Lier
- Parish: Skoger
- Norwegian Cultural Heritage Site
- Type: Church
- Status: Listed
- ID: 346704

Skoger Church (Norwegian: Skoger kirke) is a parish church of the Church of Norway in Drammen Municipality in Buskerud county, Norway. It is located in the village of Skoger. It is the main church for the Skoger parish which is part of the Drammen og Lier prosti (deanery) in the Diocese of Tunsberg. The red brick church was built in a long church design in 1885 using plans drawn up by the architect Henrik Thrap-Meyer. The church seats about 500 people.

== History ==
In the 1870s, there were plans to expand the Old Skoger Church, but it was decided instead to build a new church in the village of Skoger, about 2 kilometres (1.2 mi) from the old church. The new church was designed by Henrik Thrap-Meyer and built on land from the Ingulsåsen farm. The church was consecrated on 9 December 1885. The new Skoger Church is a long church constructed out of brick. The church has an entrance in the southeast and a choir in the northwest. There is a tower at the entrance. The choir is apsidal and surrounded by sacristies. The walls inside are plastered.

== Media gallery ==
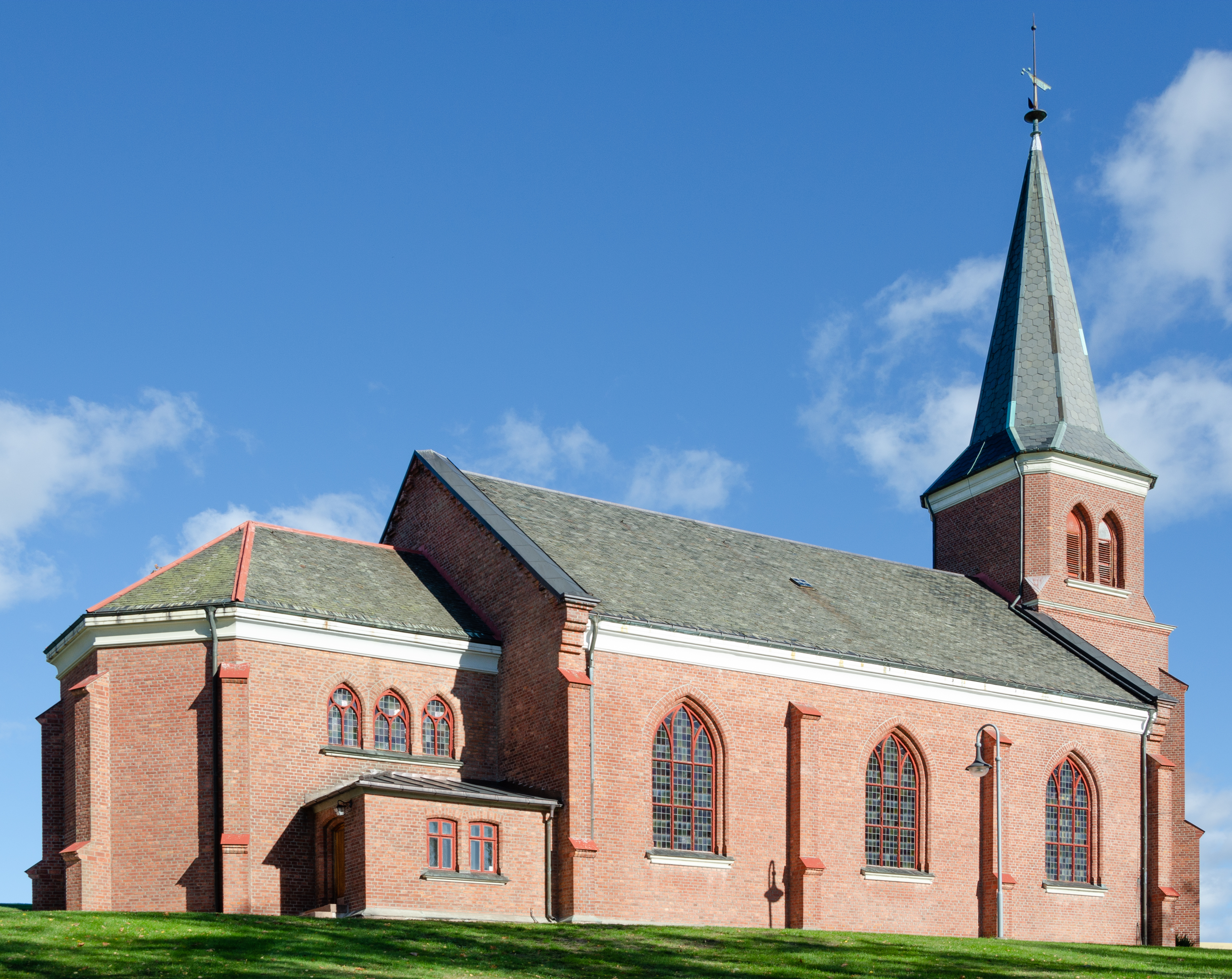

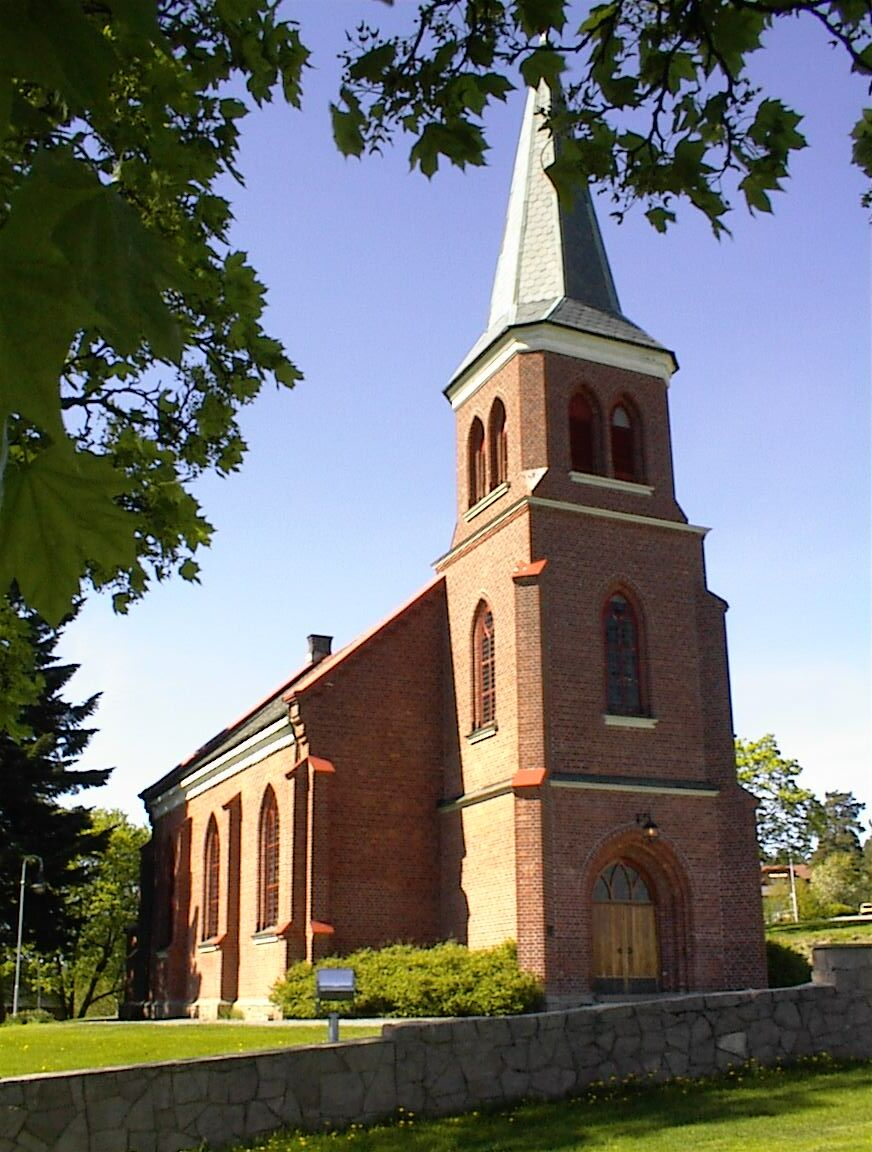

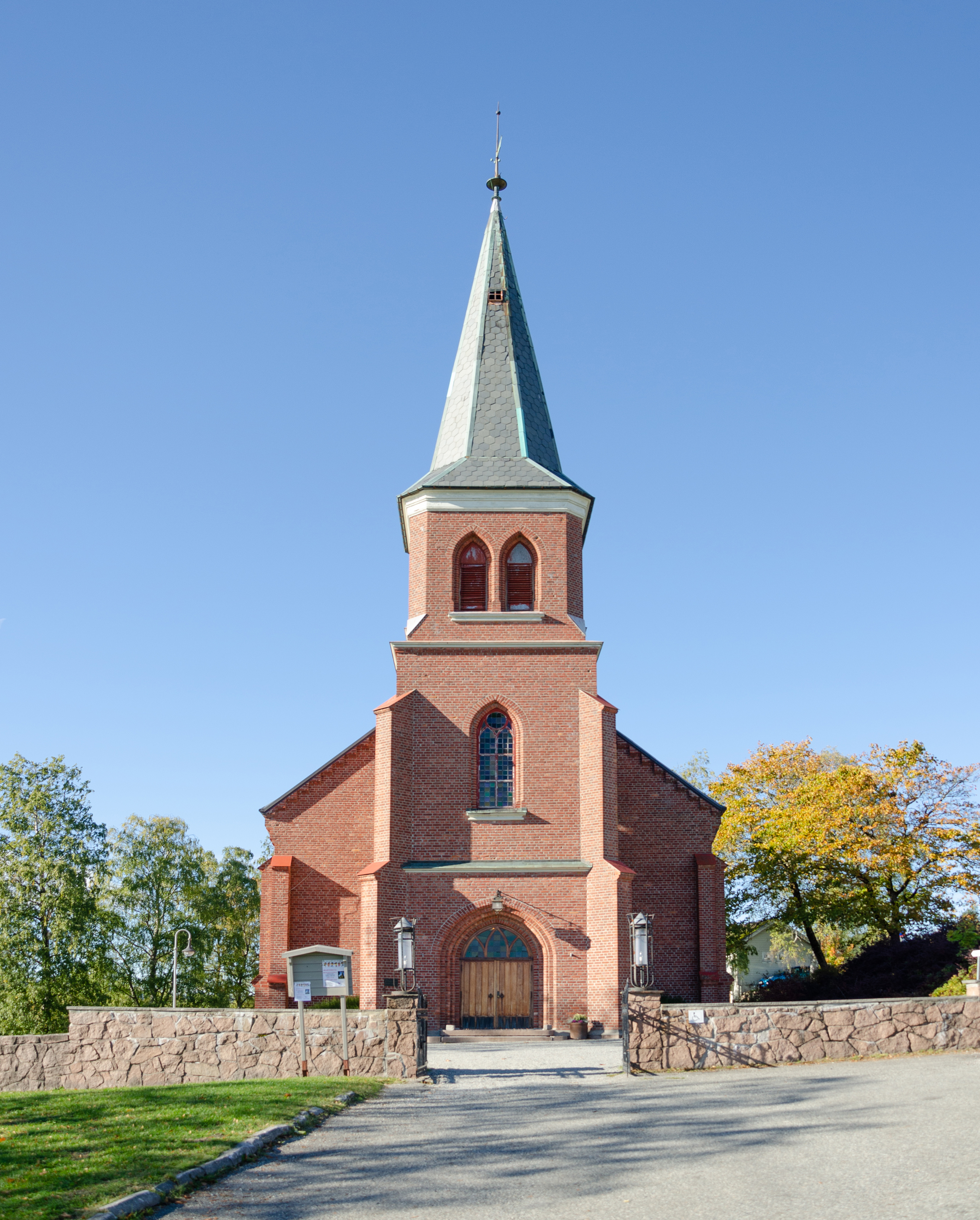

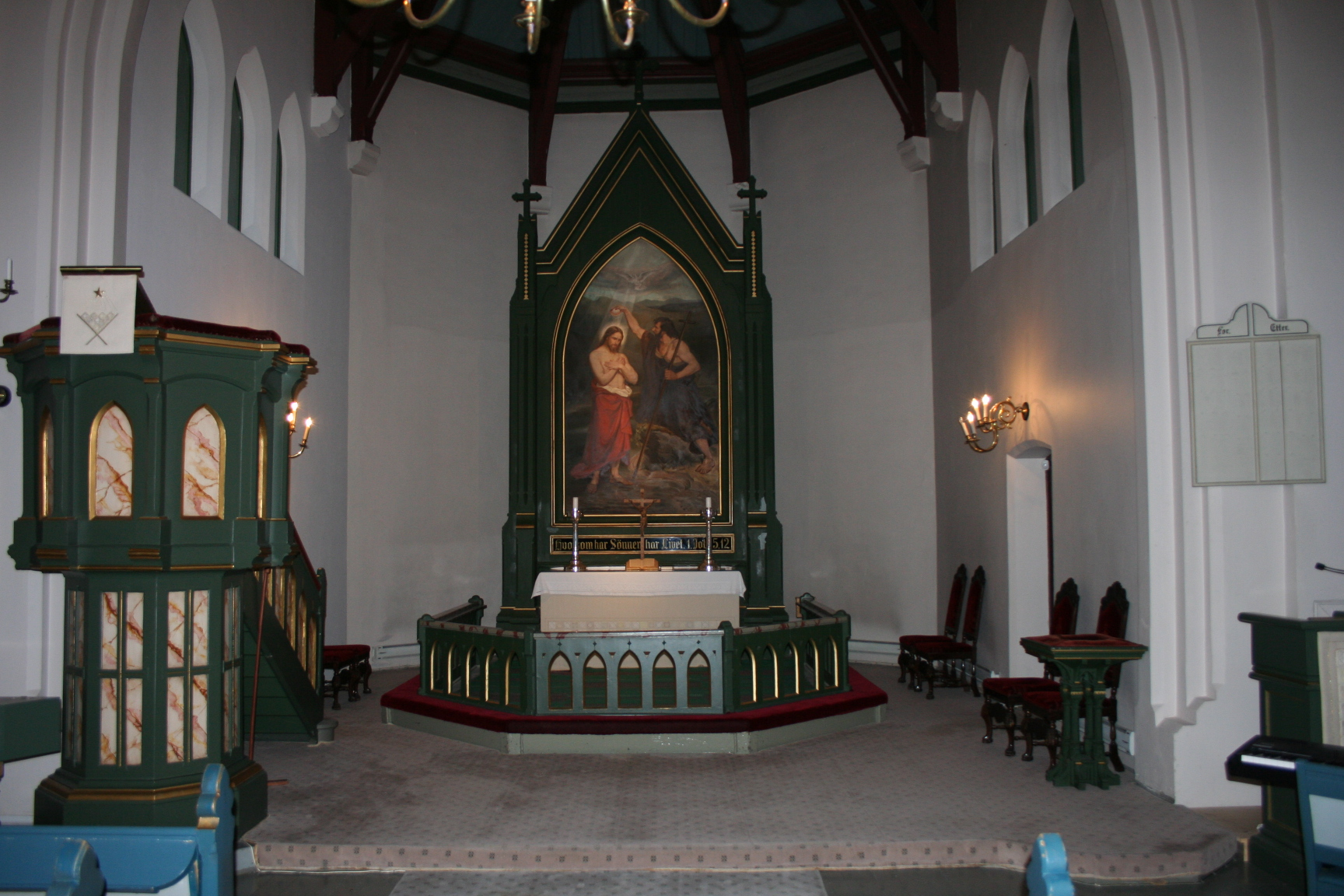

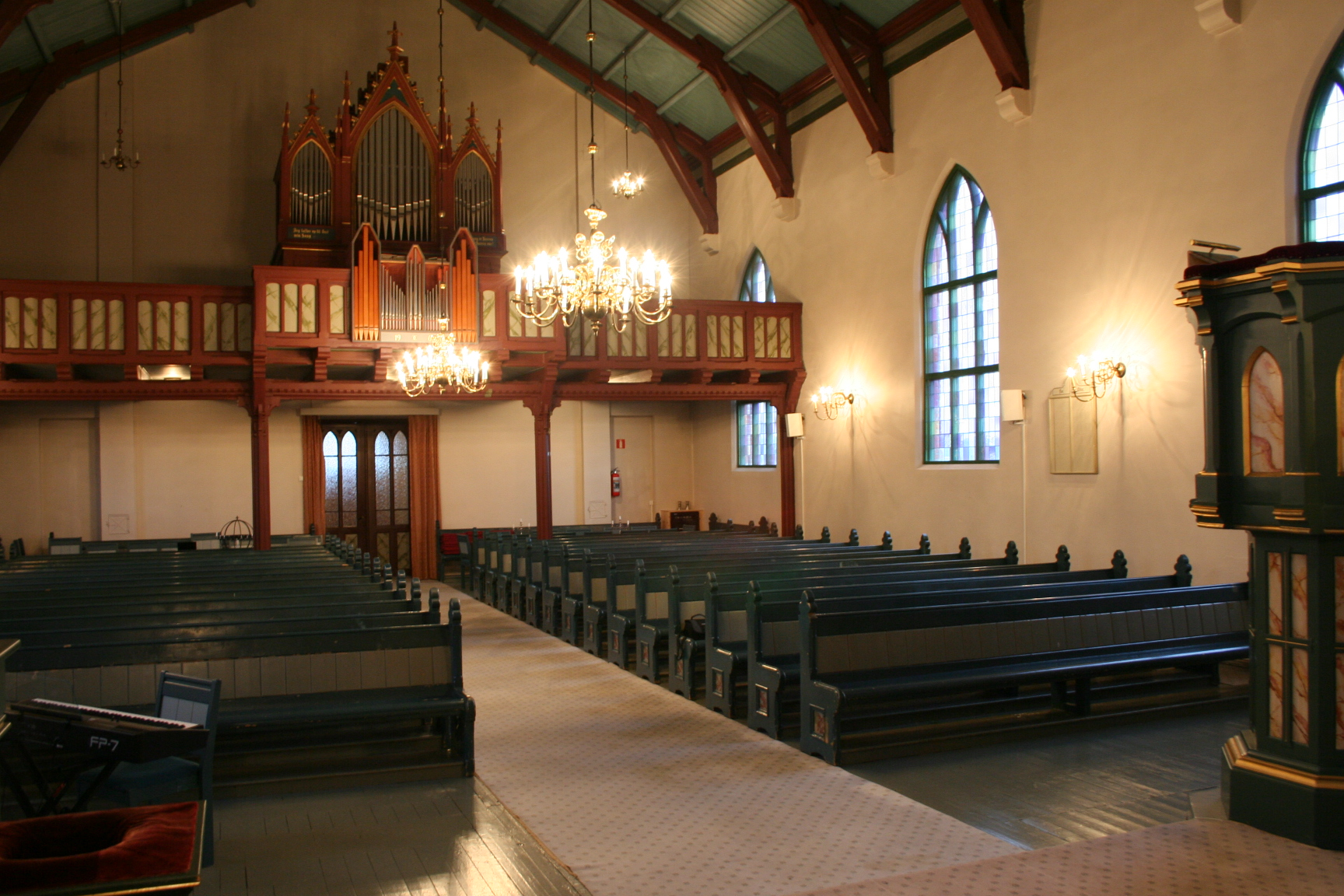

== See also ==
- List of churches in Tunsberg
