= Old Skoger Church =

Church in Buskerud, Norway

- Skoger gamle kirke
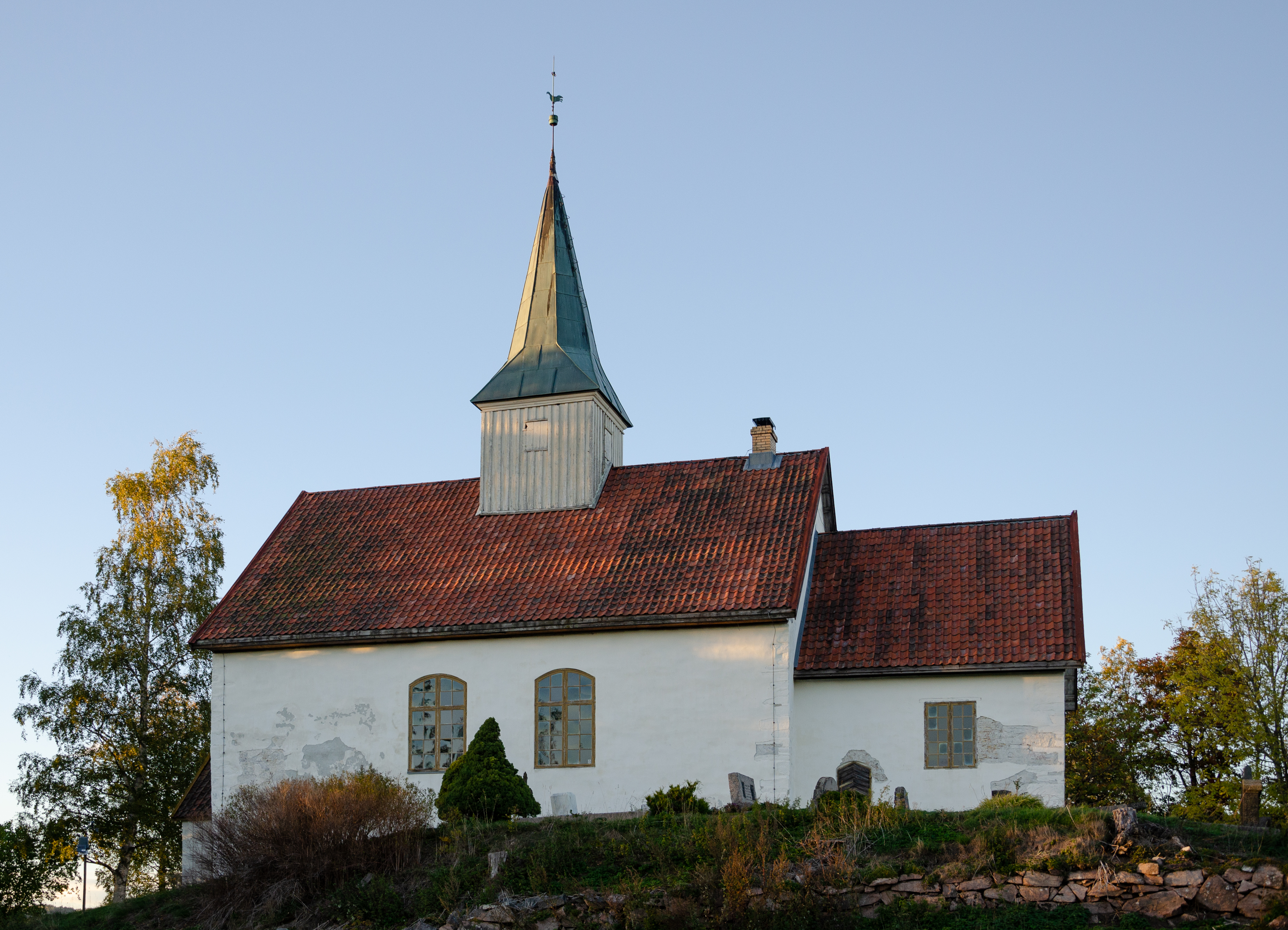
- View of the church
- Old Skoger Church
- 59°40′39″N 10°12′31″E
- Location: Drammen Municipality, Buskerud
- Country: Norway
- Denomination: Church of Norway
- Previous denomination: Catholic Church
- Churchmanship: Evangelical Lutheran

History
- Status: Parish church
- Founded: c. 1200
- Consecrated: c. 1200

Architecture
- Functional status: Active
- Architectural type: Long church
- Completed: c. 1200 (826 years ago)

Specifications
- Capacity: 100
- Materials: Stone

Administration
- Diocese: Tunsberg bispedømme
- Deanery: Drammen og Lier prosti
- Parish: Skoger
- Norwegian Cultural Heritage Site
- Type: Church
- Status: Automatically protected
- ID: 85473

Old Skoger Church (Norwegian: Skoger gamle kirke) is a parish church of the Church of Norway in Drammen Municipality in Buskerud county, Norway. It is located in the village of Skoger. It is one of the churches for the Skoger parish which is part of the Drammen og Lier prosti (deanery) in the Diocese of Tunsberg. The white, stone church was built in a long church design around the year 1200 using plans drawn up by an unknown architect. The church seats about 100 people.

== History ==
The earliest existing historical records of the church date back to the year 1396, but the church was not built that year. It is believed that the church was built in the early 13th century since the timber in the roof was felled sometime between the years 1192 and 1218. This means the Old Skoger Church is the Drammen area's oldest building and only medieval church. Bishop Eystein says in his land register that the church was dedicated to Saint Olav. There is some evidence that an even older wooden church stood on this site prior to the present stone church. The Romanesque building was designed as a long church made of stone (probably not a local stone). The nave and the choir are both rectangular. There is a small wooden porch to the west of the nave and a wooden sacristy to the north of the choir. The building was extensively renovated in the 1620s.

In 1723, the church was sold into private ownership during the Norwegian church sale when the King sold the churches to pay off debts from the Great Northern War. At that time, the church was purchased by the Count of Jarlsberg. On 21 July 1748, the church was struck by lightning and severely damaged. The lightning struck during a heavy rain storm, so the church did not catch fire, but the roof above the nave was destroyed. The Count of Jarlsberg owned the church at that time, but he was short on money and he had to ask the King of Denmark-Norway for some money to help repair the church. The church repairs were completed in 1753, both fixing the damage from the lightning and also adding a bell turret on the roof. As early as 1754, the Count sold the church to local farmers.

In 1814, this church served as an election church (Norwegian: valgkirke). Together with more than 300 other parish churches across Norway, it was a polling station for elections to the 1814 Norwegian Constituent Assembly which wrote the Constitution of Norway. This was Norway's first national election. Each church parish was a constituency that elected people called "electors" who later met together in each county to elect the representatives for the assembly that was to meet at Eidsvoll Manor later that year.

There were extensive repairs on the building during the 1820s which included a new church porch on the west end and a new tower in 1829. In 1872, there were plans to expand the church, but this did not happen. Instead, in 1883, it was decided to build a new Skoger Church was built in the village of Skoger, about 2 kilometres (1.2 mi) to the northeast. After this, the "old" Skoger Church was taken out of regular use in 1886. Since then it has been regularly maintained and it is still used for many special occasions such as weddings, funerals, and celebrations such as Olsok. There have been restorations in 1926, 1971–1973, and 1999–2001.

== Media gallery ==
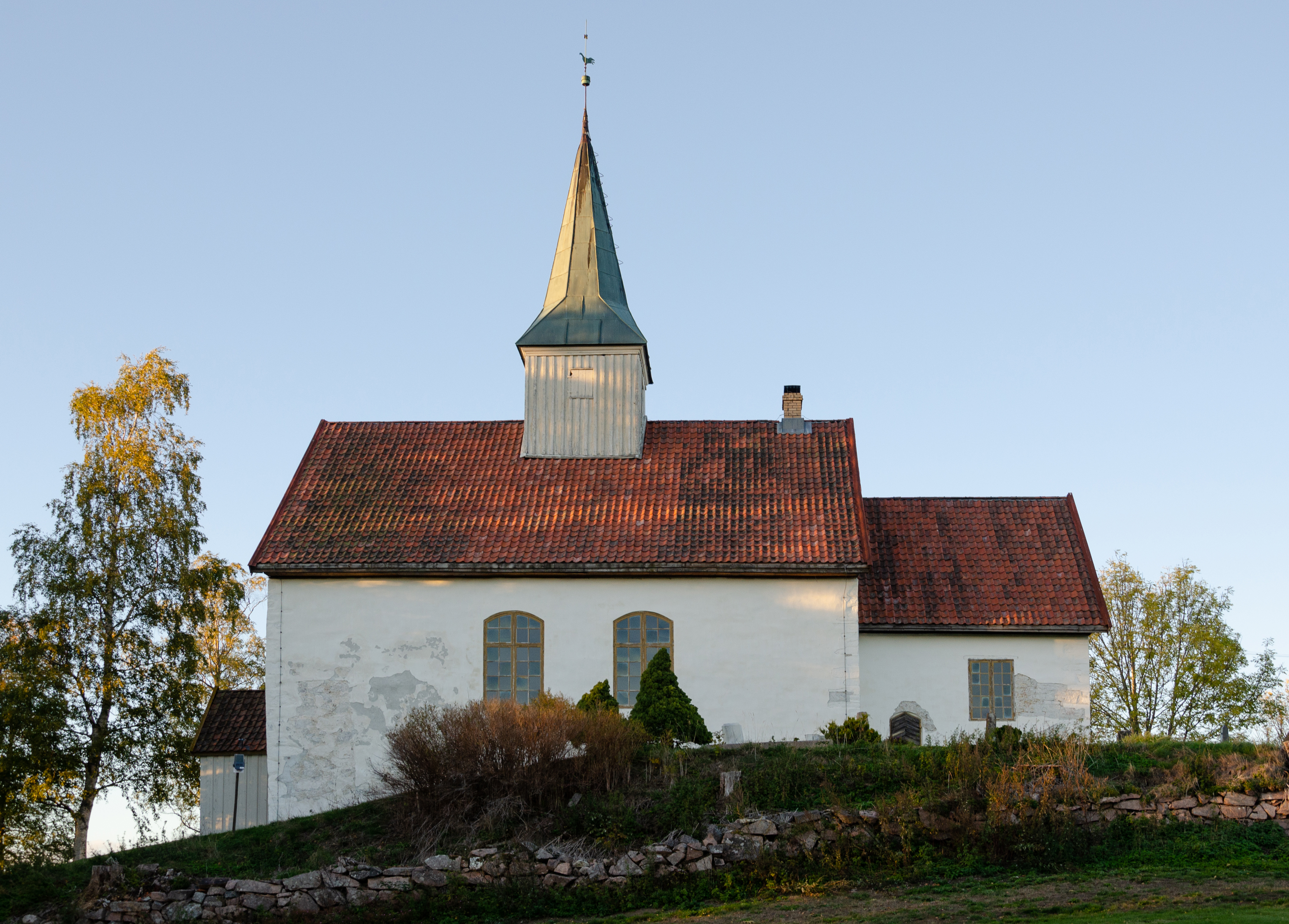

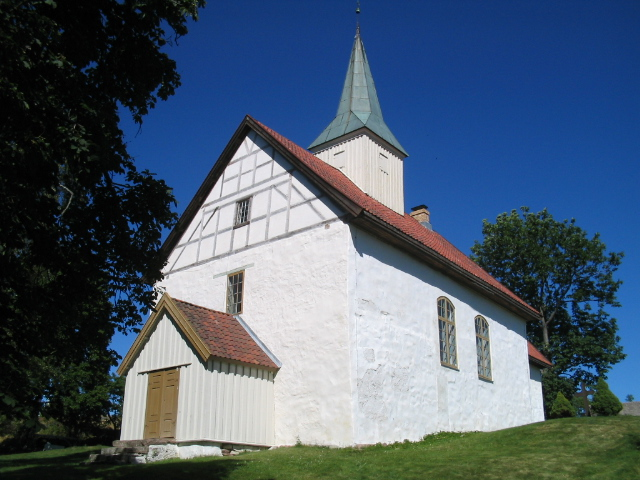

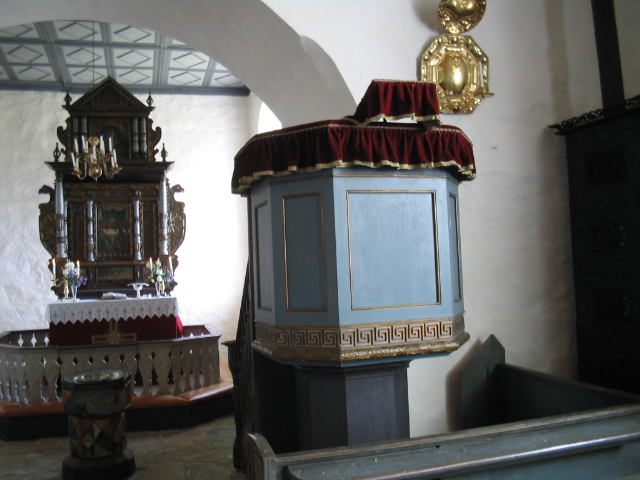

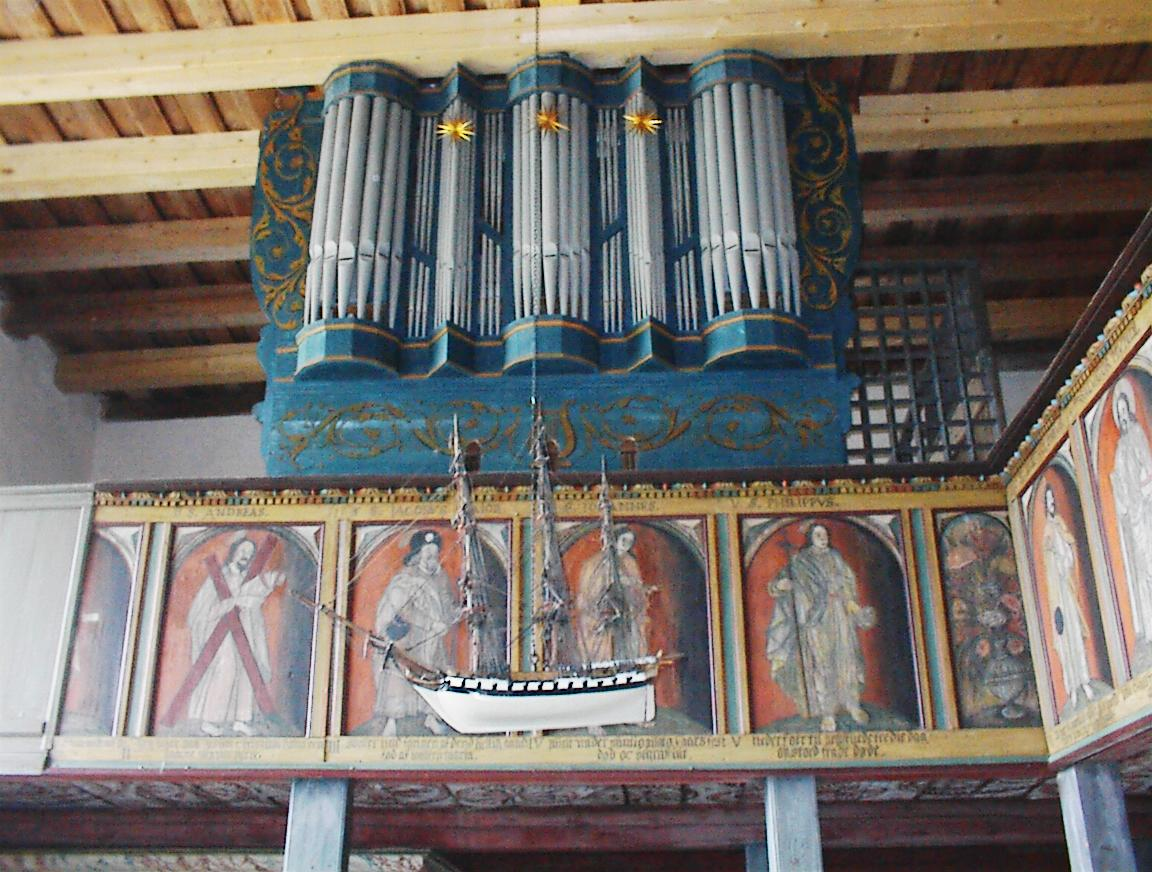

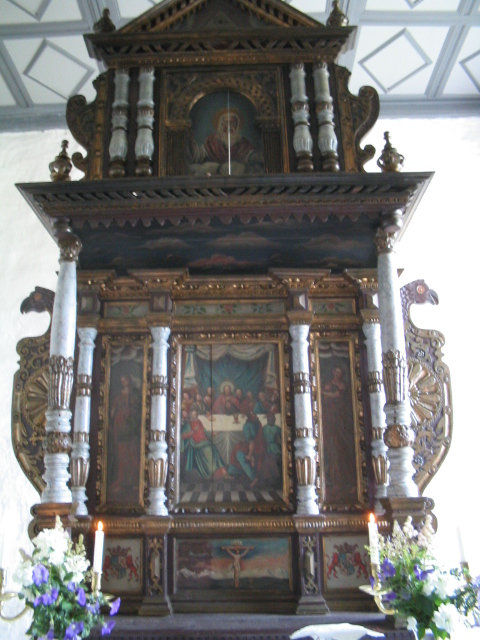

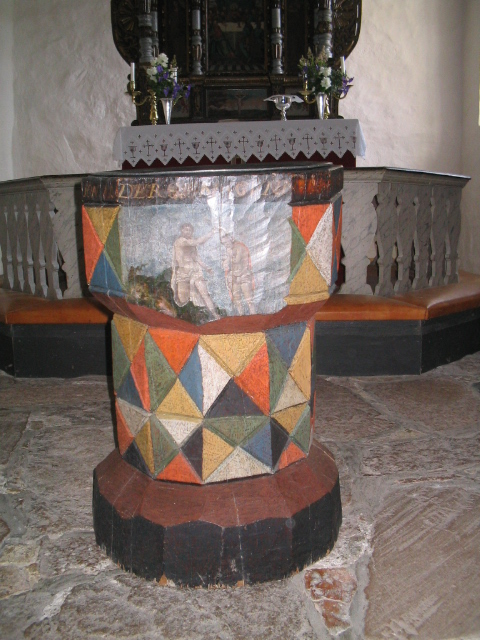

== See also ==
- List of churches in Tunsberg
