= Konnerud =

Suburb in Viken, Norway

- Suburb
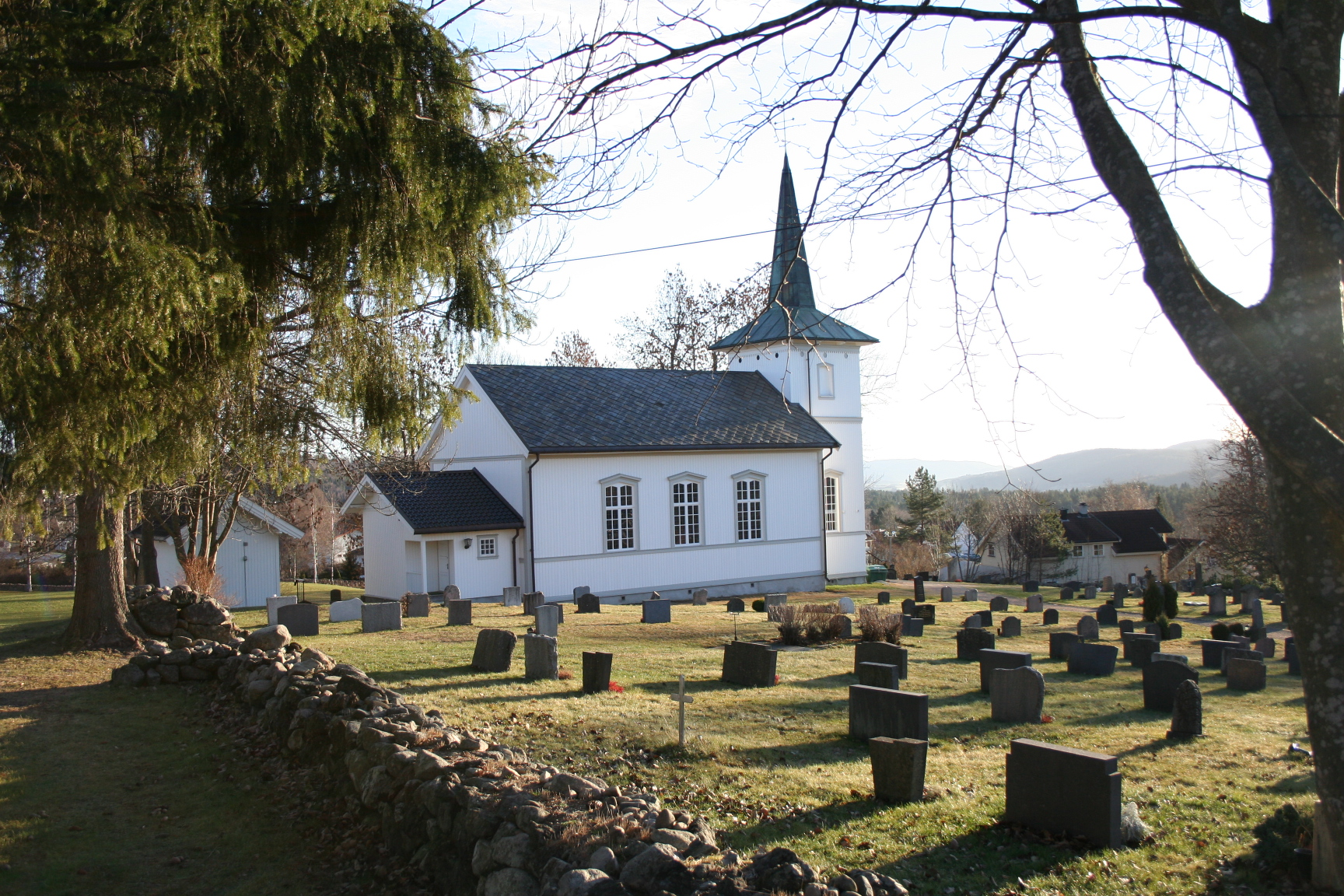
- Konnerud old church, Drammen, Norway

- Location within Buskerud Location within Norway
- Coordinates: 59°43′0″N 10°9′0″E
- Country: Norway
- County: Buskerud

Konnerud is a village located south of the city of Drammen in Buskerud, Norway. Konnerud has a population of 10 314 (2019)

== History ==
=== Etymology ===
One of the local farms gave its name to the entire area. Many of the farms located on Konnerud have names that ends with rud (mean clearing). It is generally believed that the farms located near Konnerud date from 1100 - 1400.

=== Mining ===
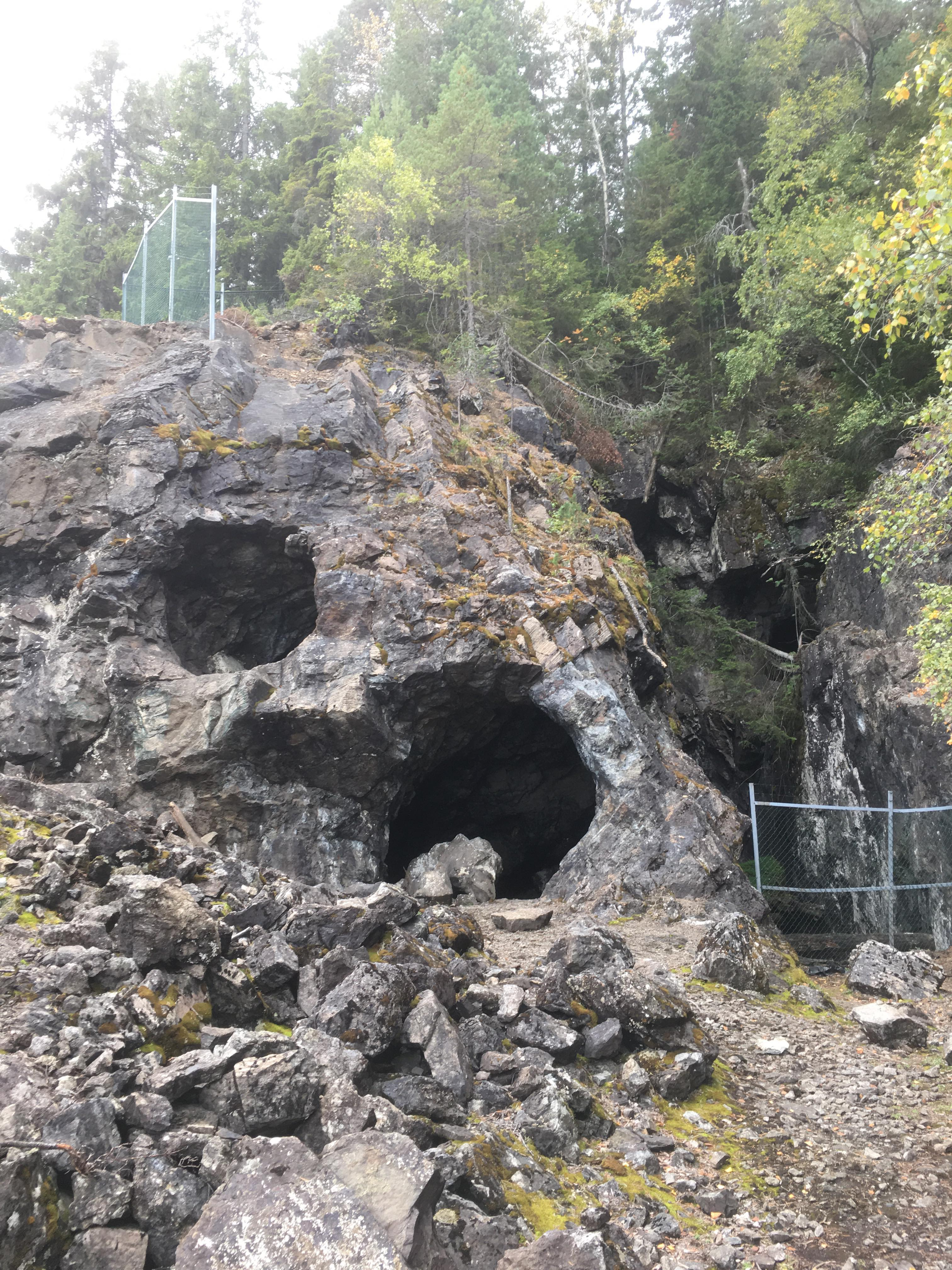
One of the many entrances to the mine

Many valuable and high quality metals and minerals including silver, copper and lead are located around Konnerudkollen, a small mountain near Konnerud. In the middle 1730s, action was taken to mine these minerals. Due to the lack of prior experience, development had been delayed until Count Wedel-Jarslberg brought in mining experts from Germany. The minerals had to be transported to Svelvik, resulting in expenses which soon exceeded revenues from mining. Many of the fishing lakes of Konnerud, such as Svensedammen and Sagdammen, exist today purely because of this problem, as the mines needed a place nearby to clean the minerals. The mining provided jobs for newcomers to Konnerud, and investors earned considerable profit until the mining was given up on completely in 1790.

=== Konnerudkollen Hotel ===
Konnerudkollen Hotel (Norwegian: Konnerudkollen Touristhotel) opened in 1898 and was used as a place where visitors could relax and get away from the stress of city life. The King of Norway, Haakon VII stayed there. It burned down to the ground in the early 1960s. Today, only two buildings remain of the hotel. Remains of the foundation can still be seen clearly. The lot where the hotel once was placed is now used as a place to keep horses.

=== Konnerud Old Church ===
In 1737, Konnerud received a church of their own due to the increased population resulting from the mining operation. The oldest church in Konnerud, (Norwegian: Konnerud Gamle Kirke), was originally built in 1760, but quickly deteriorated because of the lack of care. It was rebuilt again in the middle of 1850 and consecrated during 1858. Konnerud Old Church was designed by the architect, Georg Fredrik Wilhelm Hanstein (1820-1862). The altarpiece was painted by Nils Alstrup Dahl (1876-1940).

=== Konnerud School ===
In 1746, Count Wedel-Jarslberg decided that he would build a school in Konnerud (Norwegian: Konnerud skole). The main reason was to attract miners with families to the mines. The school burnt down completely in 1933, but was quickly rebuilt again in 1934, which was doubled in size. The school originally had a house meant for the principal, but the idea was cast away after the Second World War when the house was used by Nazi commanders. Due to the growing number of children in Konnerud, the school has had buildings attached to it during 1954, 1981, 1996 and finally in 1997. For a long time, Konnerud School was the largest school in Buskerud. The largest number of students was 750 in 1983–84.

== Skiing and sports ==
Konnerud has hosted the FIS Cross-Country World Cup on several occasions. Over half of Konnerud's inhabitants are members of the Konnerud multi-sport club (Norwegian: Konnerud Idrettslag). The Konnerud multi-sport club is one of the largest sports clubs in Norway. Since 2003 the club has - with great success - arranged World Cup Sprint in cross-country skiing in the center of Drammen. Known for its snowy winters, Konnerud is used as a recreational area for the people living in Drammen who loves skiing in the well prepared tracks leading deep into the forests.

== Other sources ==
- Haugen, Einar (1967) Norwegian-English Dictionary A Pronouncing and Translating Dictionary of Modern Norwegian (The University of Wisconsin Press) ISBN 978-0-299-03874-8
